= The Show of Our Lives – Caravan at the BBC 1968–1975 =

Live album by Caravan
- Released: 2007
- Recorded: work for the BBC between 1968 and 1975
- Genre: Progressive rock, Canterbury scene
- Length: 144:17
- Label: Decca/Universal

Caravan chronology
| The Unauthorized Breakfast Item (2003) | The Show of Our Lives – Caravan at the BBC 1968–1975 (2007) | A Hunting We Shall Go: Live In 1974 (2008) |

Professional ratings
Review scores
| Source | Rating |
|---|---|
| AllMusic | 4/5 stars |

The Show of Our Lives – Caravan at the BBC 1968–1975 is a double album of tracks recorded for the BBC in the period 1968–1975, for John Peel's Top Gear, amongst others by the British Canterbury scene progressive rock band Caravan.

== Track listing ==
Disc One

1. "Place Of My Own" – 4:12
2. "Ride" – 4:17
3. "If I Could Do It All Over Again, I'd Do It All Over You" – 2:45
4. "Hello Hello" – 3:10
5. "As I Feel I Die" – 6:23
6. "Love To Love You" – 3:12
7. "Love Song Without Flute" – 3:33
8. "In The Land Of Grey And Pink" – 3:43
9. "Nine Feet Underground" – 14:27
10. "Feelin', Reelin', Squealin" – 9:30
11. "A Hunting We Shall Go" – 9:15
12. "Waffle Part One: Be Alright / Chance Of A Lifetime" – 6:46

Disc Two

1. "Memory Lain Hugh" – 5:04
2. "Headloss" – 4:27
3. "The Love in Your Eye" – 13:54
4. "Mirror For The Day" – 4:15
5. "Virgin On The Ridiculous" – 7:01
6. "For Richard" – 15:04
7. "The Dabsong Conshirtoe" – 15:11
8. "Stuck In A Hole" – 3:14
9. "The Show Of Our Lives" – 4:54
- Tracks 1-1 and 1-2 recorded for John Peel's "Top Gear" Radio Show 31 December 1968 ("Off-Air" Recordings)
- Tracks 1-3 to 1-5 recorded for the BBC Transcription Service "Top of the Pops" 19 August 1970.
- Tracks 1-6 to 1-8 recorded for "Sounds of the Seventies" 11 March 1971.
- Tracks 1-9 and 1-10 recorded for John Peel's "Sunday Concert" at the Paris Theatre, London 6 May 1971.
- Tracks 1-11 and 1-12 recorded for the BBC "In Concert" at the Paris Theatre, London 2 August 1973.
- Tracks 2-1 and 2-2 recorded for the BBC "In Concert" at the Paris Theatre, London 2 August 1973.
- Tracks 2-3 to 2-6 recorded for John Peel's Radio Show 7 February 1974.
- Tracks 2-7 recorded for the BBC "In Concert" at the Paris Theatre, London 21 March 1975.
- Tracks 2-8 and 2-9 recorded for John Peel's Radio Show 26 June 1975.

== Personnel ==
- Pye Hastings – guitar, vocals (all)
- Richard Coughlan – drums (all)
- David Sinclair – keyboards (all, except "The Show of Our Lives")
- Richard Sinclair – bass, vocals (disc 1, 1–10)
- Geoffrey Richardson – viola, violin, guitar (disc 1, 11–12; disc 2, 1–6)
- John G. Perry – bass (disc 1, 11–12; disc 2, 1–6)
- Mike Wedgwood – bass, vocals (disc 2, 7–9)
- Jan Schelhaas – keyboards ("The Show of Our Lives")
