= Cunning Stunts (Caravan album) =

Studio album by Caravan
- Released: 25 July 1975
- Recorded: September 1974 – May 1975
- Studio: Tollington Park Studios, London
- Genre: Progressive rock; Canterbury scene
- Length: 41:47
- Label: Decca
- Producer: David Hitchcock

Caravan chronology
Caravan and the New Symphonia (1974)	Cunning Stunts (1975)	Blind Dog at St. Dunstans (1976)

Cunning Stunts is the sixth studio album by the progressive rock band Caravan, released in 1975. It was their first album with the bass guitarist, vocalist and songwriter Mike Wedgwood. The title of the album is a spoonerism for "Stunning Cunts", which is typical of their cheeky use of language. Three previous Caravan albums with titles that are also sexual plays on words are If I Could Do It All Over Again, I'd Do It All Over You (1970), In the Land of Grey and Pink (1971) and For Girls Who Grow Plump in the Night (1973).

== Background and recording ==
For a stretch of several days David Hitchcock was simultaneously producing Cunning Stunts and Renaissance's Scheherazade and Other Stories, so that he would have to work on Cunning Stunts at Tollington Park Studios during the day and on Scheherazade and Other Stories at Abbey Road Studios at night, an arrangement which Hitchcock felt negatively impacted both albums.

== Reception ==
Professional ratings
Review scores
Source	Rating
AllMusic	3/5 stars

AllMusic described it as "a solid, varied, and interesting album with plenty of character."

== Track listing ==
Side one
No.	Title	Writer(s)	Length
1.	"The Show of Our Lives"	John Murphy, Dave Sinclair	5:47
2.	"Stuck in a Hole"	Pye Hastings	3:09
3.	"Lover"	Mike Wedgwood	5:06
4.	"No Backstage Pass"	Pye Hastings	4:34
5.	"Welcome the Day"	Mike Wedgwood	4:01

Side two
No.	Title	Writer(s)	Length
1.	"The Dabsong Conshirtoe" a. "The Mad Dabsong" (2:15) b. "Ben Karratt Rides Again" (2:42) c. "Pro's and Con's" (2:29) d. "Wraiks and Ladders" (0:58) e. "Sneaking out the Bare Quare" (4:25) f. "All Sorts of Unmentionable Things" (5:11)	John Murphy, Dave Sinclair	18:00
2.	"Fear and Loathing in Tollington Park Rag"	Geoffrey Richardson	1:10

Bonus tracks
No.	Title	Writer(s)	Length
8.	"Stuck in a Hole" (single version)	Pye Hastings	3:10
9.	"Keeping Back My Love"	Pye Hastings	5:14
10.	"For Richard" (Live at the Fairfield Halls, 1974)	Richard Coughlan, Hastings, Sinclair, Richard Sinclair	18:34

== Personnel ==
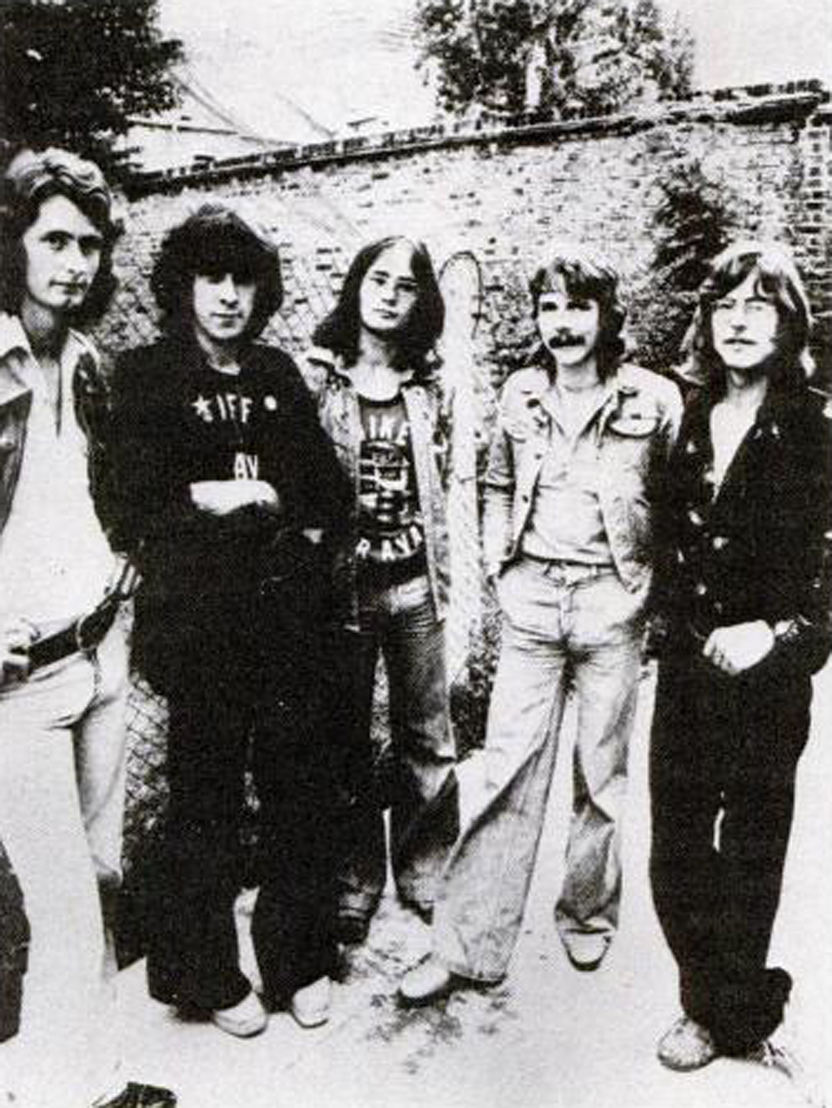
Caravan in 1974. From left to right: Hastings, Richardson, Wedgwood, Coughlan, Sinclair.

Caravan

- Pye Hastings – electric guitar and acoustic guitars, vocals
- Dave Sinclair – piano, organ, synthesizer, keyboards, string co-arrangement on "No Backstage Pass", brass co-arrangement on "Ben Karratt Rides Again" and "Sneaking out the Bare Quare"
- Geoffrey Richardson – viola, electric guitar, Western concert flute, flute, night-shift whistle
- Mike Wedgwood – bass guitar, congas, vocals, Moog brass on "Stuck in a Hole", string arrangement on "Lover" and "No Backstage Pass"
- Richard Coughlan – drums

Additional personnel

- Jimmy Hastings – brass arrangement on "Ben Karratt Rides Again" and "Sneaking out the Bare Quare"
- David Hitchcock – producer

== Charts ==
Chart (1975)	Peak position
UK Albums (OCC)	50
US Billboard 200	124
