= The Show of Our Lives =

Compilation album by Caravan
- Released: 1998
- Recorded: various dates
- Genre: Progressive rock, Canterbury scene
- Label: Mooncrest

Professional ratings
Review scores
Source	Rating
AllMusic	1.5/5.0 stars

The Show of Our Lives is a compilation album of radio broadcasts, released in 1998 by Caravan.

A more extensive release of Caravan BBC recordings was issued in 2007 as The Show of Our Lives – Caravan at the BBC 1968–1975.

== Track listing ==
No.	Title	Length
1.	"Love to Love You (And Tonight Pigs Will Fly)"	3:08
2.	"In the Land of Grey and Pink"	4:50
3.	"Golf Girl"	3:58
4.	"Love Song Without Flute"	4:32
5.	"Love in Your Eye"	13:57
6.	"If I Could Do It All Over Again, I'd Do It All Over You [Live]"	3:33
7.	"Hello, Hello"	3:08
8.	"And I Wish I Were Stoned"	7:50
9.	"For Richard"	11:49
10.	"Headloss"	4:23
11.	"The Show of Our Lives"	4:26
12.	"Memory Lain, Hugh"	4:42

== Personnel ==
- Pye Hastings – guitar, vocals
- Dave Sinclair – keyboards
- Richard Sinclair – bass, vocals
- Richard Coughlan – drums
