= Blind Dog at St. Dunstans =

Studio album by Caravan
- Released: 23 April 1976
- Genre: Progressive rock; Canterbury scene
- Length: 46:20
- Label: BTM (UK); Arista (US)
- Producer: David Hitchcock

Caravan chronology
Cunning Stunts (1975)	Blind Dog at St. Dunstans (1976)	Better by Far (1977)

Official audio
- "Jack and Jill" (Remastered) on YouTube

Blind Dog at St. Dunstans is the seventh studio album by Canterbury Scene rock band Caravan. It was released in 1976.

This album has a lighter feel than Caravan's previous releases, shifting toward shorter, "poppier" songs. The lighter feel is due in part to the prominence of Pye Hastings on the album. He wrote and sang eight of nine songs. Moreover, Jan Schelhaas had replaced Dave Sinclair on keyboards, moving away from lengthy organ-based instrumentals toward piano and synthesizer.

== Album cover and title ==
The cover art and title bring together several elements relating to Canterbury.

Saint Dunstan was Archbishop of Canterbury and patron saint of the blind, after whom a home for the blind was named.

The title comes from a Noël Coward explanation to a child for why one dog had mounted another: one dog was blind and the other was pushing him to St. Dunstan's. The cover notes gives special thanks to Coward. At the end of the song "Jack and Jill", amongst dogs barking, two speaking voices can be heard:

First voice: "What are those two doggies doing over there?" Second voice "Well, the doggie in front is blind and his friend behind is pushing him all the way to St Dunstan's"

The album cover shows St. Dunstan's Street leading to the old West Gate in Canterbury. Members of Caravan used to frequent the pubs near the St. Dunstan area.

== Reception ==
Professional ratings
Review scores
Source	Rating
AllMusic	1.5/5 stars

AllMusic described it as "'A major turn for the worse'" and said the album was detrimental to Caravan's career.

== Track listing ==
All songs composed by Pye Hastings, except where noted.

Side one
No.	Title	Writer(s)	Length
1.	"Here Am I"		6:19
2.	"Chiefs and Indians"	Mike Wedgwood	5:13
3.	"A Very Smelly, Grubby Little Oik"		4:15
4.	"Bobbing Wide"		1:13
5.	"Come on Back"		4:50
6.	"Oik (reprise)"		2:26

Side two
No.	Title	Length
7.	"Jack and Jill"	6:26
8.	"Can You Hear Me?"	6:17
9.	"All the Way (with John Wayne's Single-Handed Liberation of Paris)"	9:03

== Personnel ==
Caravan

- Pye Hastings – vocals (tracks 1, 3–9); electric and acoustic guitars
- Geoffrey Richardson – viola, electric guitar, flute, night-shift whistle
- Jan Schelhaas – keyboards
- Mike Wedgwood – vocals (track 2); bass guitar, congas
- Richard Coughlan – drums

Additional personnel

- Jimmy Hastings – flute, alto saxophone, tenor saxophone, clarinet
- David Hitchcock – producer
- Chanter Sisters – backing vocalist, backing vocals

Credits

- Lead vocals on all songs by Pye Hastings, except track 2, by Mike Wedgwood.
- "Here Am I": lead guitar – Pye Hastings
- "A Very Smelly, Grubby Little Oik": lead guitar – Geoffrey Richardson
- "Bobbing Wide": flutes – Geoffrey Richardson
- "Come on Back": lead guitar & flute – Geoffrey Richardson; tenor sax and clarinet – Jimmy Hastings
- "Oik (reprise)": lead guitar & flute – Geoffrey Richardson; tenor sax and clarinet – Jimmy Hastings
- "Jack and Jill": lead guitar – Pye Hastings
- "All the Way (with John Wayne's single-handed liberation of Paris)": flute, alto sax – Jimmy Hastings

== Live recordings ==
Surprise Supplies (later renamed Here Am I) is a live album featuring all the Blind Dog at St. Dunstans songs, except for "Jack and Jill", recorded at a concert of 4 May 1976.

The next day, 5 May 1976, Caravan played on the John Peel show for BBC Radio One. Recordings of this show appear on the 1998 release Ether Way: BBC Sessions, 1975–1977: "All the Way", "A Very Smelly Grubby Little Oik", "Bobbing Wide", "Come on Back" and "Grubby Oik Reprise".

== Charts ==
Chart (1976)	Peak position
UK Albums (OCC)	53
