= The Unauthorised Breakfast Item =

Studio album by Caravan
- Released: 2003
- Genres: Progressive rock, Canterbury scene
- Length: 60:07
- Label: Eclectic Discs
- Producer: Julian Gordon Hastings

Caravan chronology
Live at the Fairfield Halls, 1974 (2002)	The Unauthorised Breakfast Item (2003)	The Show of Our Lives – Caravan at the BBC 1968–1975 (2007)

Professional ratings
Review scores
Source	Rating
AllMusic	3/5 stars
DPRP	8.5/10 stars

The Unauthorised Breakfast Item is the thirteenth studio album by progressive rock band Caravan, released in 2003.

== Track listing ==
All tracks are written by Pye Hastings, except as noted below.

Disc one
No.	Title	Writer(s)	Length
1.	"Smoking Gun (Right for Me)"		5:36
2.	"Revenge"		5:15
3.	"The Unauthorised Breakfast Item"		4:44
4.	"Tell Me Why"		6:16
5.	"It’s Getting a Whole Lot Better"		8:56
6.	"Head Above the Clouds"		7:21
7.	"Straight Through the Heart"		4:40
8.	"Wild West Street"		4:47
9.	"Nowhere to Hide"	Dave Sinclair	8:54
10.	"Linders Field"	Doug Boyle	3:38
Total length:			60:07

Disc two
No.	Title	Writer(s)	Length
1.	"Smoking Gun (Right for Me)" (Live in Japan)		7:56
2.	"The Unauthorised Breakfast Item" (Live in Japan)		6:16
3.	"Tell Me Why" (Live in Japan)		5:45
4.	"Revenge" (Live in Japan)		5:42
5.	"For Richard" (Live in Quebec City)	Richard Coughlan, Hastings, D. Sinclair, Richard Sinclair	14:22
Total length:			40:01

== Personnel ==
- Pye Hastings – lead vocals, guitars
- Geoffrey Richardson – viola, banjo, ukulele, acoustic guitar, backing vocals
- Doug Boyle – lead guitar
- Jan Schelhaas – keyboards, backing vocals
- Jim Leverton – bass, backing vocals; lead vocals on "Nowhere to Hide"
- Richard Coughlan – drums

Additional personnel

- Jimmy Hastings – tenor and soprano saxophone, flute
- David Sinclair – keyboards on "Nowhere to Hide"
- Simon Bentall – percussion
- Ralph Cross – additional percussion on "The Unauthorised Breakfast Item"
