= Songs for Oblivion Fishermen =

Live album by Caravan
- Released: 9 June 1998
- Recorded: 19 August 1970 – 7 February 1974
- Genre: Progressive rock
- Length: 73:03
- Label: Hux
- Producers: Bernie Andrews, John Muir, Tony Wilson

Caravan chronology
| Travelling Man (1998) | Songs for Oblivion Fishermen (1998) | Ether Way (1998) |

Professional ratings
Review scores
| Source | Rating |
|---|---|
| AllMusic | 4.5/5.0 stars |

Songs for Oblivion Fishermen is a live album of the progressive rock group Caravan. The material was recorded for the BBC, spanning the years 1970 to 1974.

== Track listing ==
| No. | Title | Music | Length |
|---|---|---|---|
| 1. | "Hello, Hello" | Coughlan, Hastings, Sinclair, Sinclair | 2:51 |
| 2. | "If I Could Do It All over Again, I'd Do It All over You" | Coughlan, Hastings, Sinclair, Sinclair | 2:48 |
| 3. | "As I Feel I Die" | Coughlan, Hastings, Sinclair, Sinclair | 6:24 |
| 4. | "Love Song Without Flute" | Coughlan, Hastings, Sinclair, Sinclair | 3:20 |
| 5. | "Love to Love You (And Tonight Pigs Will Fly)" | Coughlan, Hastings, Sinclair, Sinclair | 2:25 |
| 6. | "In the Land of Grey and Pink" | Coughlan, Hastings, Sinclair, Sinclair | 3:39 |
| 7. | "Memory Lain Hugh" | Hastings | 4:54 |
| 8. | "A Hunting We Shall Go" / "Backwards" | Hastings, Mike Ratledge | 8:25 |
| 9. | "Love in Your Eye" | Coughlan, Hastings, Sinclair | 13:52 |
| 10. | "Mirror for the Day" | Hastings | 4:15 |
| 11. | "For Richard" | Coughlan, Hastings, Sinclair, Sinclair | 15:03 |
| 12. | "Virgin on the Ridiculous" | Hastings | 7:00 |

- Tracks 1 – 3 recorded for Top of the Pops 19.8.1970
- Tracks 4 – 6 recorded in session for Alan Black 11.3.1971, first transmitted 9.4.1971
- Tracks 7 – 8 recorded in session for John Peel 20.8.1973, first transmitted 30.8.1973
- Tracks 9 – 12 recorded in session for John Peel 7.2.1974, first transmitted 14.2.1974
- Tracks 1 – 8 are original mono recordings

== Personnel ==
Caravan

- Pye Hastings – guitar, vocals, liner notes
- Geoffrey Richardson – viola
- Dave Sinclair – keyboards, vocals
- Richard Sinclair – bass guitar, vocals (tracks 1–6)
- John G. Perry – bass guitar (tracks 7–12)
- Richard Coughlan – drums

== Release information ==
| Year | Type | Label | Catalog # |
|---|---|---|---|
| 1998 | CD | Hux | 2 |
| 1998 | CD | Cleopatra | 280 |
| 2000 | CD | Hux | 0000000002 |
| 2001 | CD | Big Eye | 4058 |
| 2001 | CD | Cleopatra | 0280 |
