= Better by Far =

Studio album by Caravan
- Released: July 1977
- Recorded: March – April 1977
- Studio: Utopia Studios, London
- Genre: Progressive rock; Canterbury scene; pop rock; soft rock
- Length: 43:25
- Label: Arista
- Producer: Tony Visconti

Caravan chronology
Blind Dog at St. Dunstans (1976)	Better by Far (1977)	The Album (1980)

Professional ratings
Review scores
Source	Rating
AllMusic	link

Better by Far is the eighth studio album by Canterbury scene rock band Caravan.

== Track listing ==
All songs composed by Pye Hastings, except where noted.

Side one
No.	Title	Writer(s)	Length
1.	"Feelin' Alright"		3:31
2.	"Behind You"		5:04
3.	"Better by Far"		3:27
4.	"Silver Strings"	Geoff Richardson	3:58
5.	"The Last Unicorn"	Richardson	5:52

Side two
No.	Title	Writer(s)	Length
1.	"Give Me More"		4:40
2.	"Man in a Car"	Jan Schelhaas	5:43
3.	"Let It Shine"		4:27
4.	"Nightmare"		6:23

== Personnel ==
Caravan

- Pye Hastings – vocals, guitars
- Geoff Richardson – viola, guitars, flute, sitar, mandolin, vocals
- Jan Schelhaas – keyboards, backing vocals
- Dek Messecar – bass, backing vocals
- Richard Coughlan – drums, percussion

Additional personnel

- Vicki Brown – vocals on "Give Me More"
- Fiona Hibbert – harp on "Man in a Car"
- Tony Visconti – recorders on "The Last Unicorn"; electric double bass on "Man in a Car"

== Releases ==
- 1977: LP - Arista 4134
- 1977: LP - Arista 1008
- 2004: CD - Eclectic Discs 1018
- 2005: CD - Eclectic Discs 1018
- 2005: CD - Eclectic Discs 230456
