= The Album (Caravan album) =

- Original UK vinyl cover

Studio album by Caravan
- Released: 31 October 1980
- Recorded: July 1980
- Studio: Farmyard (Little Chalfont, England)
- Genre: Pop rock
- Length: 43:41
- Label: Kingdom

Caravan chronology
Better by Far (1977)	The Album (1980)	Back to Front (1982)

Professional ratings
Review scores
Source	Rating
AllMusic	2/5 stars

The Album is the ninth album released by English progressive rock band Caravan. It was recorded at Farmyard Studios, Little Chalfont, Buckinghamshire in July 1980.

== Background and recording ==
After a year of inaction followed by Caravan being dropped from Arista Records, Caravan reformed with a line up of Pye Hastings, Geoff Richardson, Dave Sinclair, Richard Sinclair and Richard Coughlan. After attempting to record a live album, Richard Sinclair dropped out of the line up and was replaced by Dek Messecar. The group decided to scrap the live album when it was learned that a studio album could be recorded with the same budget.

Members Dave Sinclair and Geoff Richardson contributed to songwriting duties alongside main songwriter Pye Hastings. The material moved in the direction of shorter songs and more mainstream instrumentation than previous albums.

The only promotional work undertaken was an appearance on French television to promote the "Heartbreaker" single release in France. Caravan's performance was interrupted by the news of the failed assassination attempt of John Paul II in Rome.

== Track listing ==
Side one
No.	Title	Writer(s)	Length
1.	"Heartbreaker"	Pye Hastings	3:38
2.	"Corner of Me Eye"	Geoff Richardson	3:39
3.	"Watcha Gonna Tell Me"	Dave Sinclair	5:48
4.	"Piano Player"	John Murphy, Dave Sinclair	5:23
5.	"Make Yourself at Home"	Dave Sinclair	3:27

Side two
No.	Title	Writer(s)	Length
1.	"Golden Mile"	Jim Atkinson	3:11
2.	"Bright Shiny Day"	Pye Hastings	6:19
3.	"Clear Blue Sky"	Geoff Richardson	6:25
4.	"Keepin' Up De Fences"	Pye Hastings	5:21

Bonus tracks on Eclectic remaster (2004)
No.	Title	Length
1.	"Heartbreaker (single version)"	3:40
2.	"It's Never Too Late"	6:24

== Personnel ==
Caravan

- Pye Hastings – vocals, guitar
- Geoff Richardson – guitar, viola, flute, vocals
- Dave Sinclair – organ, piano, electric piano, synthesizer
- Dek Messecar – bass guitar, vocals
- Richard Coughlan – drums

Additional personnel

- Stephen W. Tayler – engineer, mixing
- Ian Morais – engineer, mixing
- Terry King – production co-ordinator

Releases information

- LP Kingdom CDKVL 9003 (1980)
- CD Eclectic 1011 (2004 remaster)

== See also ==
- Music of the United Kingdom
