= Caravan and the New Symphonia =

Live album by Caravan
- Released: 19 April 1974; February 2001 (re-issue)
- Recorded: 28 October 1973
- Venue: Theatre Royal in Drury Lane on the Pye Mobile Recording Unit
- Genre: Progressive rock; Canterbury scene
- Length: 43:18; 78.14 (re-issue)
- Label: Decca
- Producer: David Hitchcock

Caravan chronology
For Girls Who Grow Plump in the Night (1973)	Caravan and the New Symphonia (1974)	Cunning Stunts (1975)

Professional ratings
Review scores
Source	Rating
AllMusic	4/5 stars

Caravan and the New Symphonia is a record by Caravan recorded on 28 October 1973 at the Theatre Royal in Drury Lane and originally released in 1974 on UK Decca's subsidiary Deram. Bringing the band and The New Symphonia Orchestra together for this recording was the work of Martyn Ford, conductor of the New Symphonia, and John G. Perry, who played bass with Caravan at the time. An expanded and re-ordered version was published in 2001. This version claims to have the tracks in the order as played.

== Track listing ==
Side one
No.	Title	Writer(s)	Length
1.	"Introduction"	Simon Jeffes	5:55
2.	"Mirror for the Day"	Pye Hastings	4:19
3.	"The Love in Your Eye"	Richard Coughlan, Pye Hastings, Richard Sinclair	12:02

Side two
No.	Title	Writer(s)	Length
1.	"Virgin on the Ridiculous"	Pye Hastings	6:53
2.	"For Richard"	Richard Coughlan, Pye Hastings, Dave Sinclair, Richard Sinclair	13:48

2001 CD rerelease
No.	Title	Writer(s)	Length
1.	"Introduction by Alan Black"		1:01
2.	"Memory Lain, Hugh / Headloss"	Pye Hastings	9:57
3.	"The Dog, The Dog, He's at it Again"	Pye Hastings	6:35
4.	"Hoedown"	Pye Hastings	3:55
5.	"Introduction"	Simon Jeffes	6:04
6.	"The Love in Your Eye"	Richard Coughlan, Pye Hastings, Richard Sinclair	12:23
7.	"Mirror for the Day"	Pye Hastings	4:45
8.	"Virgin on the Ridiculous"	Pye Hastings	7:55
9.	"For Richard"	Richard Coughlan, Pye Hastings, Dave Sinclair, Richard Sinclair	15:00
10.	"A Hunting We Shall Go"	Pye Hastings, John G. Perry, Mike Ratledge	10:33

== Personnel ==
Caravan

- Pye Hastings – guitar, vocals
- Geoff Richardson – electric viola
- Dave Sinclair – electric piano, organ, synthesizer
- John G. Perry – bass guitar, vocals
- Richard Coughlan – drums
- The New Symphonia Orchestra

Backing vocals

- Liza Strike
- Vicki Brown
- Margot Newman
- Helen Chappelle
- Tony Burrows
- Robert Lindop
- Danny Street

The New Symphonia

Martyn Ford (conductor), Richard Studt (leader), Irvine Arditti, Paul Beer, Ted Chance, Andrew Cauthery, Roger Chase, Lynden Cranham, Michael Crowther, Robin Davies, Rita Eddowes, Liz Edwards, Wilfred Gibson, Lucy Finch, Jo Frohlich, Wilf Gibson, Roy Gillard, Michael Harris, Tony Harris, Jimmy Hastings, Terry Johns, Skaila Kanda, Skaila Kanga, Garry Kettell, Chris Laurence, Helen Liebmann, Stephen May, Donald McVay, Dee Partridge, Geoff Perkins, Morris Pert, Mike Perton, Martin Robinson, Godfrey Salmon, Jan Schlapp, Colin Walker, Cathy Weiss, Robin Williams, Dave Woodcock, Nick Worters, Gavyn Wright.
