= Vicki Brown =

English singer (1940–1991)

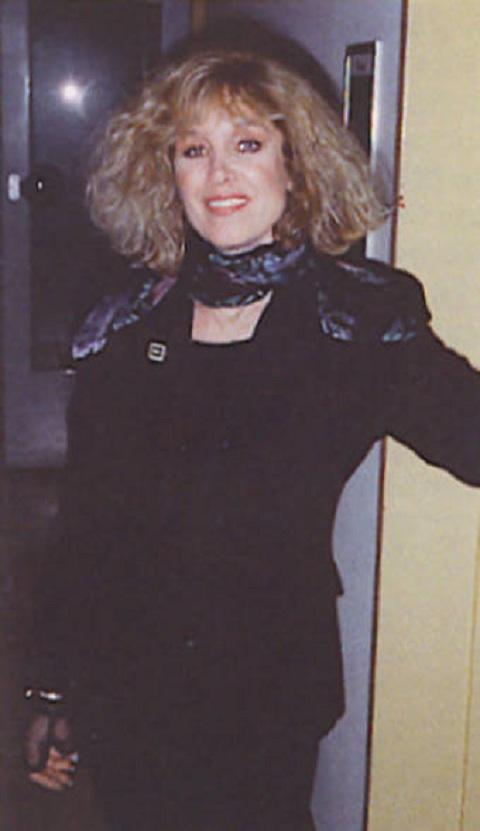
- Brown in 1989

Background information
- Born: Victoria Mary Haseman; 23 August 1940; Liverpool, England
- Died: 16 June 1991 (aged 50); Henley-on-Thames, England
- Genres: Pop; rock; jazz; contemporary classical
- Occupations: Singer; backing vocalist
- Instrument: Vocals
- Years active: 1958–1990
- Labels: Pye; RCA Victor
- Formerly of: Various and numerous – see text

Victoria Mary Brown (née Haseman; 23 August 1940 – 16 June 1991) was an English pop, rock and contemporary classical singer. She was a member of both the Vernons Girls and the Breakaways and was the first wife of fellow singer and musician Joe Brown and mother of the singer Sam Brown.

== Biography ==
Brown was born Victoria Mary Haseman, on 23 August 1940 in Liverpool, England.

She married Joe Brown and, after leaving the Breakaways, remained a prolific session singer under the name Vicki Brown. The Browns had two children, Sam and Pete Brown; the former a successful singer-songwriter, the latter a record producer.

In 1972, Joe Brown formed Brown's Home Brew, which played rock and roll, country and gospel music and featured his wife in the line-up. They released two albums, Brown's Home Brew (1972) and Together (1974), on which both Browns appeared. She also recorded with her sister, Mary Partington, as The Seashells reaching No. 32 in the UK Singles Chart in September 1972 with "Maybe I Know" (originally recorded in 1964 by Lesley Gore).

In 1973, Brown recorded a single with Stephanie de Sykes under the name of The Tree People, entitled "It Happened on a Sunday Morning".

By 1975, Brown had appeared in the film, Tommy, billed as 'Nurse #2'. Her public profile heightened after notably providing the female vocal on the 1976 UK no. 1 hit single, "No Charge", by J. J. Barrie. Brown released her first solo UK album in 1977, From The Inside, produced by Shel Talmy. The record was released by the Power Exchange Records label.

In 1979, Brown began recording with The New London Chorale and the group's popularity in the Netherlands paved the way for Brown's solo stardom in that country. She also featured as one of the soloists on a series of The Young ... created by Tom Parker, with The New London Chorale: The Young Messiah (1979; originally performed as a concert on television in the UK in 1977), The Young Matthew Passion (1986) The Young Wolfgang Amadeus Mozart (1986), The Young Verdi (1988) and The Young Beethoven (1990).

Brown also worked with Gary Moore, George Harrison, Jon Lord, Roger Waters, Willy DeVille, Adam Ant, Steve Marriott, Alvin Lee, Chris Farlowe, Cerrone, Yvonne Keeley and Eric Burdon. Brown's involvement with Pink Floyd over several years included her participation in Pink Floyd live performances, specifically the Dark Side of the Moon Tour and A Momentary Lapse of Reason Tour.

She died of breast cancer on 16 June 1991, in Henley-on-Thames, at the age of 50.

== Backing vocal credits ==
The following list, which is not exhaustive, gives an overview of Brown's recorded output as a backing vocalist.

- Muswell Hillbillies - The Kinks (1971)
- You're So Vain – Carly Simon (1972)
- Tanx - T. Rex (1973)
- Messin' – Manfred Mann's Earth Band (1973)
- Caravan and the New Symphonia – Caravan (1974)
- Sneakin' Sally Through the Alley – Robert Palmer (1974)
- Another Time, Another Place – Bryan Ferry (1974)
- Rampant – Nazareth (1974)
- Tomorrow Belongs to Me – Sensational Alex Harvey Band (1975)
- Tommy – film soundtrack (1975)
- Hair of the Dog – Nazareth (1975)
- Pressure Drop – Robert Palmer (1975)
- Come on Over – Olivia Newton-John (1976)
- Let's Stick Together – Bryan Ferry (1976)
- Better by Far – Caravan (1977)
- Playmates - Small Faces (1977)
- Survivor – Eric Burdon (1977)
- A Single Man – Elton John (1978)
- "Part-Time Love" – Elton John (1978 single)
- "I Don't Care" – Elton John (1978 single)
- Chappo – Roger Chapman (1979)
- "Here Comes That Sound Again" – Love De-Luxe (1979 single)
- Friend or Foe - Adam Ant (1982)
- Gone Troppo – George Harrison (1982)
- Before I Forget – Jon Lord (1982)
- Victims of Circumstance - Barclay James Harvest (1984)
- Cinema – Elaine Paige (1984)
- About Face – David Gilmour (1984)
- Miracle - Willy DeVille (1987)
- Radio K.A.O.S. – Roger Waters (1987)
- "You Boyz Make Big Noize" – Slade (1987 single)
- Stop! – Sam Brown (1988)

== Solo discography ==
- From the Inside (1977) (Produced by Shel Talmy)
- Vicki Brown (1987)
- Lady of Time (1989) – RCA Victor
- About Love and Life (1990)
- The Collection (1993)
- "Look at Me" (1999) (single)
- Forever (2001)
