= Wal (bass) =

Electric bass guitar

Wal / Electric Wood
- Company type: Private
- Industry: Musical instruments
- Founded: 1974
- Founder: Ian Waller, Pete Stevens
- Headquarters: Surrey, England
- Area served: Global
- Products: Bass guitars
- Owner: Paul Herman
- Website: walbasses.co.uk

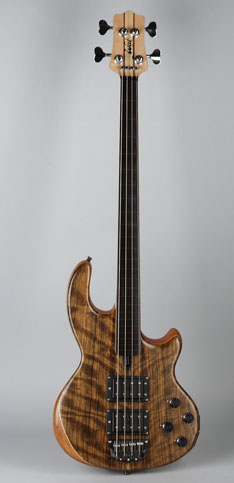
Wal Mk II Fretless Bass

Wal is a brand of electric bass guitar manufactured by Electric Wood Ltd, first in High Wycombe, Buckinghamshire and later in Fetcham, Surrey, England. The company was started in 1974 by a guitar builder and an electronics expert Ian Waller and luthier Pete Stevens. Since 2009, the company has been run by Paul Herman.

== History ==
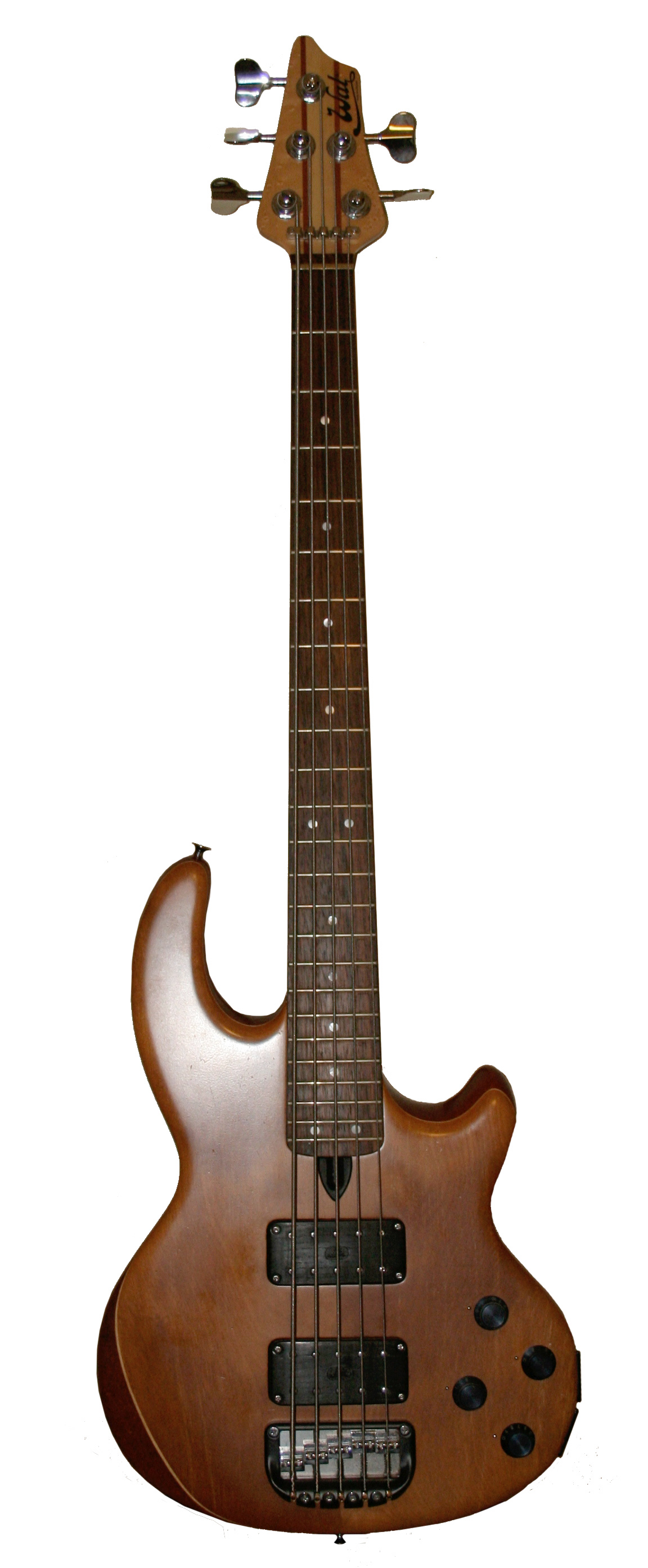
Wal 5-String Bass

The company's founder, Ian Waller, was a bass player in the 1960s Manchester pop music scene. In the late 1960s he moved to London to pursue a career as an electronics engineer, and with his electronics and woodworking skills he quickly became involved in the film and music industry. He became known to players on the London session scene for his guitar-making abilities and was commissioned to build bass guitars.

Waller's early custom basses were purchased by leading players from the London studio circuit, such as John Gustafson (at the time of Roxy Music) and John G. Perry (formerly of Caravan), who commissioned the first instrument branded as a "Wal" bass. Another early commission was for a triple-necked bass which was purchased by Rick Wakeman for his bass player Roger Newell to use in "The Myths and Legends of King Arthur and the Knights of the Round Table" concerts. This bass guitar was later given to Chris Squire of Yes, and is now on loan to the Hard Rock Cafe.

A short run of semi-custom models designated the JG series after the owner of one of the first models, John Gustafson, featured hand-tooled leather scratch plates. The company introduced distinctive eight-coil humbucking pick-ups and proprietary bridge hardware which became a feature of all future Wal bass models. Future owners included John Entwistle, Paul Simonon, Gary Tibbs, Alan Spenner, and Percy Jones.

The first full production range of Wal basses appeared in 1978 as the "Pro Series". These basses followed the basic design specifications of the JG series (solid ash body, maple, hornbeam and Amazonian hardwood neck and rosewood fingerboard), with plastic rather than leather scratchplates. The Pro series offered a range of electronics options, such as one or two pick-ups and passive or active wiring. The active models introduced switchable filters for each pick-up, allowing certain frequencies to be cut or boosted to provide a wider range of tonal options, and they featured a "pick attack" feature, which boosted a narrow band of upper-mid range frequencies to simulate the attacking tone of a plectrum when playing fingerstyle.

The Pro Series was superseded by the Custom Series in 1983. This series introduced the laminated bodies which are now standard on all Wal basses, and various woods such as American walnut, schedua, hydua, padauk and wenge were offered as facings over a mahogany core. The range was expanded during the 1980s, and 5-string and 6-string models and three distinct body shapes were introduced. These are referred to as Mark 1 (the original Custom 4-string style, developed from the shape of the JG and Pro Series); and the Mark 2, (introduced with the 5-string model, a larger body with a rounder profile at the bridge end of the body and a more asymmetric upper cutaway than the Mark 1). The Mark 3 body style was introduced with the arrival of 6-string models in the early 1990s, these being essentially slimmer versions of the Mark 2 body style. Other rare models were also available periodically, including a MIDI-bass (the MB4 & MB5) and a simplified passive model.

The popularity of the brand grew through the 1980s, and the company expanded while retaining its custom builder ethos and approach. Paul Herman, who would later take over control, began working for the company. During this period, Wal basses were widely used by UK session players and "name" bass players such as Paul McCartney, Bruce Thomas, Geddy Lee, John Illsley, Martin Kemp, Flea, Justin Chancellor, Mick Karn, and others.

== Death of founder, restart ==
Waller died of a heart attack in 1988 at the age of 43, and Pete Stevens took over the running of the business. After 2000, there was a significant contraction of the company, which culminated in Stevens working as a sole trader with little or no additional workforce, and the supply of Wal basses becoming increasingly limited. Around 2005, Stevens's failing health and changes to the company's workshop premises caused him to fall behind on the order book. By the end of 2007 his health problems forced him to retire, and the future of the brand was in doubt.

On 20 August 2008, it was announced that business would resume under the control of luthier Paul Herman, who had worked at Wal during the late 1980s and 1990s, with production moved from High Wycombe to a workshop in Fetcham, Surrey. Herman cleared outstanding back orders, and on 5 October 2009 the company began inviting orders again with the launch of a new Wal basses website.

Stevens died on 28 December 2011, shortly after his 65th birthday.
