= Dave Hitchcock =

English record producer

Dave Hitchcock (1949 – 8 January 2026) was an English record producer working with such bands as Genesis, Caravan, Camel, Curved Air and Renaissance.

Hitchcock worked in A&R as a staff producer at Decca Records, also worked with Charisma Records and then became an independent record producer forming the company Gruggy Woof Productions.

He later retrained as a chartered accountant with KPMG with the aim of becoming someone who could provide financial advice for musicians. He then joined Ernst & Young's Entertainment & Media Group. In 1992, he left to manage the business affairs of Monty Python before founding his own accountancy business, DBM Ltd, which focuses on "artists, producers, writers and other creatives - 85% of what we do is music-related."

Hitchcock died on 8 January 2026, aged 76.

== Production credits ==
Albums produced by Hitchcock include:

=== Albums with Camel ===
- Mirage (1974)
- Snow Goose (1975)

=== Albums with Caravan ===
- In the Land of Grey and Pink (1971)
- Waterloo Lily (1972)
- For Girls Who Grow Plump in the Night (1973)
- Caravan and the New Symphonia (1974)
- Live (1975)
- Cunning Stunts (1975)
- Blind Dog at St. Dunstans (1976)
- Where but for Caravan Would I? (2000)
- Live at the Fairfield Halls, 1974 (2002)

=== Albums with Curved Air ===
- Curved Air – Live (1975)

=== Albums with East of Eden ===
- East of Eden (1971)

=== Albums with Genesis ===
- Foxtrot (1972)

=== EPs with Marillion ===
- Market Square Heroes (1982)

=== Albums with Mellow Candle ===
- Swaddling Songs (1972)

=== Albums with Fuchsia (band) ===
- Fuchsia (1971)

=== Albums with The Pink Fairies ===
- Kings of Oblivion (1973)
- Pink Fairies (1991)

=== Album with Renaissance ===
- Scheherazade and Other Stories (1975)
