= Jan Schelhaas =

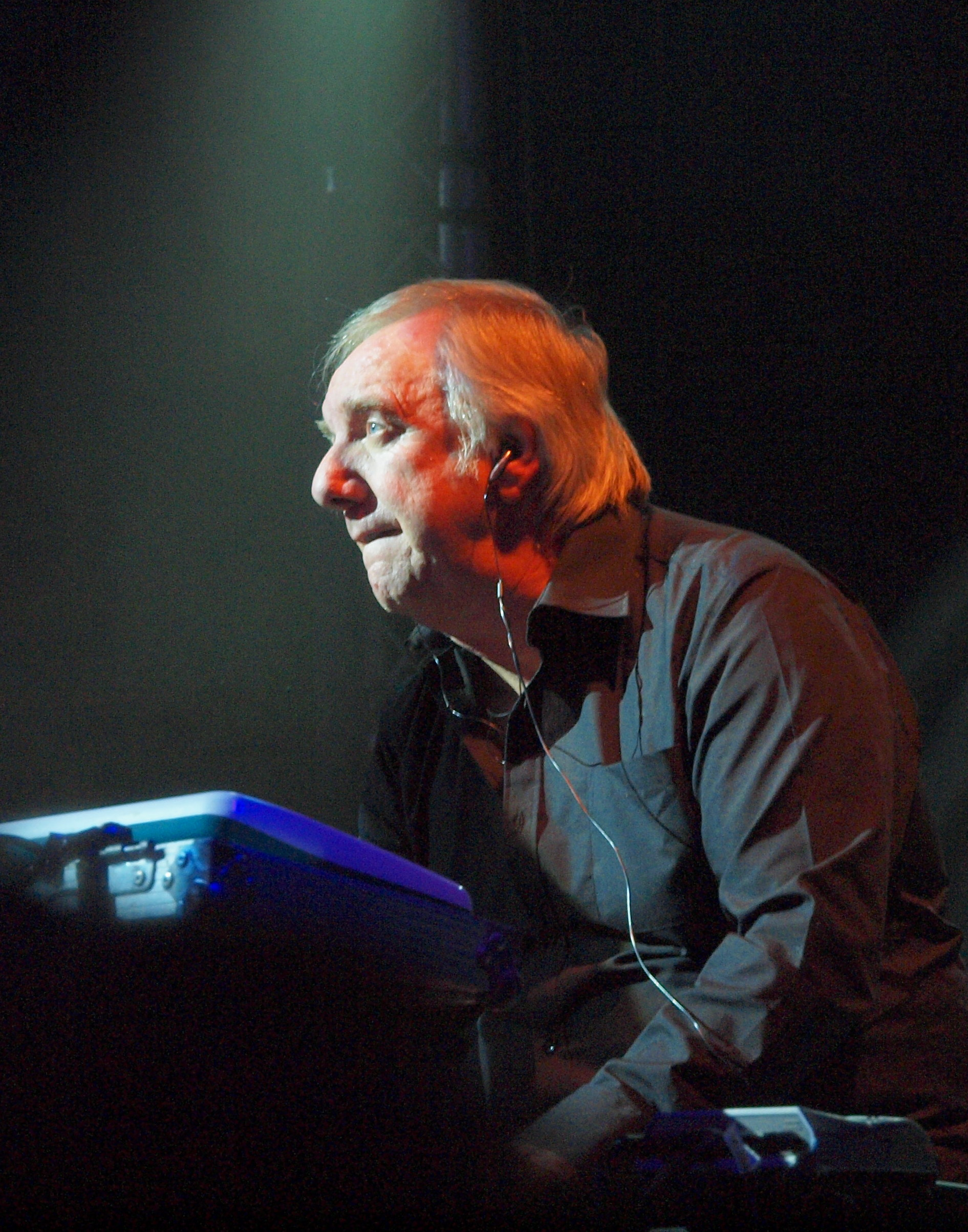
- Schelhaas in 2012

Background information
- Born: 11 March 1948 (age 77); Liverpool, England
- Genres: Progressive rock
- Instrument: Keyboards
- Years active: 1960s to present

Jan Russell Schelhaas (born 11 March 1948) is an English musician, mostly known as the keyboard player from the bands Caravan and Camel.

== Biography ==
Schelhaas was born in Liverpool, where he started his career playing bass for several bands and releasing a single on Decca's Deram label as the soul band Bernie & the Buzz Band in 1968 before finally turning to keyboards and starting the soft rock band, National Head Band, in 1970 with Neil Ford on guitar, Dave Paull (future Jonesy)and future Uriah Heep's Lee Kerslake on drums. They released the album Albert One in 1971 produced by Yes producer Eddy Offord, but without any success. Next stop for Schelhaas was the Gary Moore band and the recording of the album Grinding Stone from 1973. After the recording, he left Moore to do solo projects including an organ session on Thin Lizzy's 1973 Vagabonds of the Western World album.

In July 1975, Schelhaas was asked to play keyboards in the band Caravan after Dave Sinclair left them. Jan Schelhaas toured around the world with the band and recorded three albums: Blind Dog at St. Dunstans (1976), Better by Far (1977) and Cool Water, which was not released until 1994. In 1978, Caravan had a break and Schelhaas accepted an offer to join Camel on their world tour for their album Breathless (1978). At that time, the band also included cousins Richard Sinclair (bass and vocals) and Dave Sinclair (keyboards) with whom he had already played in Caravan.

Schelhaas worked with Camel until 1981, when he contributed to I Can See Your House from Here in 1978/9 and the album Nude with associated tour. in 1981.

From 1982 to 1989, he played on two of Lee Fardon's albums: The God Given Right and The Savage Art of Love and the EP Palestine. Schelhaas had met Fardon when they both played with Ross Stagg in the early 1970s.

In 2002, Schelhaas was once again asked to join Caravan due to Dave Sinclair having left because of musical differences. He recorded The Unauthorized Breakfast Item with them in the same year plus a tour. Although there was a hiatus in the band's activities from 2005-10 (during which he released his first solo album, Dark Ships, in 2008). A further two solo albums were to follow, Living on a Little Blue Dot in 2014 and Ghosts of Eden in 2018 (All three now re-released on ‘Talking Elephant Records’ with bonus tracks.

Schelhaas remains a member of Caravan and appears on their albums, 2013's Paradise Filter and 2021's It’s None of Your Business'.
