= In the Land of Grey and Pink =

Studio album by Caravan
- Released: 8 April 1971
- Recorded: September 1970 – January 1971
- Studio: Decca Studios and AIR Studios, London
- Genre: Progressive rock; psychedelic rock; Canterbury scene
- Length: 43:31
- Label: Deram
- Producer: David Hitchcock

Caravan chronology
| If I Could Do It All Over Again, I'd Do It All Over You (1970) | In the Land of Grey and Pink (1971) | Waterloo Lily (1972) |

Audio sample
- "In the Land of Grey and Pink": file; help

In the Land of Grey and Pink is the third album by English progressive rock band Caravan, released in April 1971 on Deram Records. It was produced by David Hitchcock and was the last album to feature the original lineup of Richard Coughlan, Pye Hastings, Richard Sinclair and Dave Sinclair until 1982's Back to Front.

The album was written and recorded during late 1970 and early 1971, and featured more material from Richard Sinclair. Hastings, who had been the main songwriter on the previous two releases, contributed only one track. Instrumentally, the music is dominated by David Sinclair's keyboard solos, and side two is taken up by a 22-minute suite of songs, "Nine Feet Underground". The cover features a Tolkien-influenced painting.

The album was critically well received but was not a chart success, which led to frustration within the band and David Sinclair's departure. Nevertheless, it has remained in print and sold steadily, and been recommended by critics as a good introduction to the Canterbury Scene genre. The band look back favourably on the album and several of its tracks have remained fixtures in Caravan's live repertoire. It has been reissued several times, including a comprehensive 40th anniversary remix package by British musician and producer Steven Wilson in 2011.

== Background and recording ==
Though Caravan had yet to achieve strong commercial success in 1970, they had started to build a live following, including an appearance at the Kralingen Pop Festival in the Netherlands to an audience of 250,000 and the 10th Plumpton Festival. In between touring, the group had written several new pieces that they wanted to record. Having had problems self-producing the previous album, If I Could Do It All Over Again, I'd Do It All Over You, the group decided to collaborate with producer David Hitchcock. Hitchcock had become a fan of the band and had been a key figure in getting them signed to Decca Records. He had progressed from the label's art department to production and was keen to work on the album. The group had been apprehensive about Hitchcock working on If I Could Do It All Over Again... but after discovering his enthusiasm and creative ideas, decided it would be a good idea to enrol him as producer.

Recording began in September 1970 at Decca Studios, West Hampstead, London. Guitarist Pye Hastings had written the bulk of material for earlier albums, which led to a backlog of songs composed by the rest of the group; consequently he only offered a single song, "Love to Love You (And Tonight Pigs Will Fly)". Bassist Richard Sinclair had written "Golf Girl", a song about his girlfriend and future wife. Both songs were written in a straightforward pop style, in contrast to some longer pieces on the album. Keyboardist David Sinclair had composed a number of different musical segments that he wanted to link together to a suite of songs. The group helped with the arranging and joining of sections, resulting in a 22-minute piece, "Nine Feet Underground". The song was recorded in five separate sections and edited together by Hitchcock and engineer Dave Grinsted. Most of the work is instrumental, aside from two sections with lyrics. David Sinclair played most of the solos on the track, and indeed the entire album, on either fuzztone organ or piano.

Most of the album aside from "Nine Feet Underground" was recorded in December at Air Studios in Oxford Street. "Group Girl" had been tried at Decca Studios but was re-recorded with different lyrics as "Golf Girl", which featured flute and trombone parts. "Winter Wine" had been recorded in September as a rough instrumental with wordless vocals, but was given a second attempt at Air Studios, by which time it had acquired lyrics about dreams and fairy tales. The final version features a folk influenced acoustic guitar introduction and included an improvised organ section in the middle. The last track to be recorded was the title track, which featured the sound of Richard Sinclair blowing bubbles. The album was mixed at Decca in January 1971.

During the sessions at Air Studios, the band recorded a rough version of "Aristocracy", but it was shelved and re-recorded the following year for the next album, Waterloo Lily. The title was suggested by Richard Sinclair; the "land of grey and pink" refers to the band's home county of Kent. He came up with the phrase after looking at the sky at sunset during rehearsals at Graveney early in the band's career.

== Release and reception ==
Professional ratings
Review scores
| Source | Rating |
|---|---|
| AllMusic | 4.5/5 stars |

The album was released on 8 April 1971 and featured a Tolkien influenced cover, drawn by Anne Marie Anderson. It did not chart in the UK, but sold steadily throughout the 1970s, remaining in print, with "Nine Feet Underground" becoming a popular track on late-night FM radio. The group became frustrated with their lack of commercial success, which they blamed on Decca's lack of promotion. In August 1971, David Sinclair accepted an offer to join former Soft Machine drummer and vocalist Robert Wyatt in a new band, Matching Mole.

The album was reissued in 2001 on CD with bonus tracks, including early takes of "Winter Wine" and "Golf Girl" at Decca Studios. A new edition of the album, remixed in both stereo and 5.1 surround sound by British musician and producer Steven Wilson was released on two CDs and a DVD to coincide with its 40th anniversary in 2011. As well as the original album, the reissue included outtakes, BBC Radio sessions, and a television performance on the German music show Beat-Club. The album was also available in a limited edition of 500 copies on 180g vinyl, remastered by Pascal Byrne. It was reissued on vinyl in Canada in September 2014. Extended remixes of "Golf Girl" and "Love to Love You" were included in the 2000 anthology, Where but for Caravan Would I?.

Rolling Stone listed the album as No. 34 on their list of 50 Greatest Prog Rock Albums of All Time, saying it evoked "a Middle Earth sunset, with the music wavering between medieval folk melodies and jazz-savvy musos". According to AllMusic reviewer Dave Thompson, the album is "one of the most beloved, and eccentric prog albums of them all" and "probably Caravan's finest hour". He also said that "Nine Feet Underground" was "the most for the dynamic chemistry that blended the band together" and that "Golf Girl" "emerges as the kind of song that remains stuck in your head for days after you hear it, no matter how many more records you play immediately after". Progressive rock author Stephen Lambe has said that "Nine Feet Underground" is "not just the archetypal Caravan piece but a symbol of a whole movement." Marco Rossi, writing in Record Collector said "Canterbury Scene initiates are strongly advised to start here." In the Q and Mojo Classic Special Edition Pink Floyd & The Story of Prog Rock, the album came No. 19 in its list of "40 Cosmic Rock Albums". Mojo also said In the Land of Grey and Pink was "the quintessential Canterbury album".

The band look favourably on the album. Hastings later said the group "began to peak in many ways" and praised in particular David Sinclair's playing and Hitchcock's production skills. Caravan continue to perform songs from In the Land of Grey and Pink in their live repertoire, particularly "Nine Feet Underground" and "Golf Girl".

== Track listing ==
All songs by Richard Coughlan, Pye Hastings, Dave Sinclair and Richard Sinclair (except "Aristocracy", by Coughlan, Hastings and Richard Sinclair).

Side One
| No. | Title | Lead vocal | Length |
|---|---|---|---|
| 1. | "Golf Girl" | R. Sinclair | 5:05 |
| 2. | "Winter Wine" | R. Sinclair | 7:46 |
| 3. | "Love to Love You (And Tonight Pigs Will Fly)" | Hastings | 3:06 |
| 4. | "In the Land of Grey and Pink" | R. Sinclair | 4:51 |

Side Two
| No. | Title | Lead vocal | Length |
|---|---|---|---|
| 1. | "Nine Feet Underground" a. "Nigel Blows a Tune" (5:42) b. "Love's a Friend" (3:20) c. "Make It 76" (1:45) d. "Dance of the Seven Paper Hankies" (1:08) e. "Hold Grandad by the Nose" (2:16) f. "Honest I Did!" (2:03) g. "Disassociation" (3:16) h. "100% Proof" (3:13) | Hastings (b.), R. Sinclair (g.) | 22:43 |
| Total length: | | | 43:31 |

Bonus tracks (2001 remastered CD)
| No. | Title | Length |
|---|---|---|
| 6. | "Frozen Rose (I Don't Know Its Name Alias The Word)" | 6:12 |
| 7. | "Aristocracy" | 3:42 |
| 8. | "It's Likely to have a Name Next Week" (Instrumental version of "Winter Wine") | 7:48 |
| 9. | "Group Girl" (First version of "Golf Girl" with different lyrics) | 5:04 |
| 10. | "Disassociation/100% Proof (New Mix)" (Closing section of "Nine Feet Underground") | 8:35 |
| Total length: | | 31:21 |

Bonus tracks (40th Anniversary Deluxe Edition) added to CD1
| No. | Title | Length |
|---|---|---|
| 6. | "Frozen Rose (I Don't Know Its Name Alias the Word)" (Steven Wilson New Stereo Mix) | 6:08 |
| 7. | "Love to Love You (And Tonight Pigs Will Fly)" (Steven Wilson New Stereo Mix) | 3:26 |
| 8. | "Nine Feet Underground – Medley" (Alternate Stereo Mix) | 22:39 |

Bonus tracks (40th Anniversary Deluxe Edition) CD2
| No. | Title | Length |
|---|---|---|
| 1. | "Aristocracy" (Album Session Recordings, December 1970) | 3:15 |
| 2. | "It Doesn't Take a Lot" (Album Session Recordings, December 1970) | 3:14 |
| 3. | "Love to Love You (And Tonight Pigs Will Fly)" (Extended Version / Album Session Recordings, December 1970) | 3:21 |
| 4. | "It's Likely to Have a Name Next Week" ("Winter Wine" Instrumental Demo / Album Session Recordings, December 1970) | 7:48 |
| 5. | "Nigel Blows a Tune" (First version / Album Session Recordings, December 1970) | 5:51 |
| 6. | "Group Girl" ("Golf Girl" First Version / / Album Session Recordings, December 1970) | 5:14 |
| 7. | "Love Song With Flute" (Recorded for the BBC's "Sounds of The Seventies", 11 March 1971) | 3:33 |
| 8. | "In the Land of Grey and Pink" (Recorded for the BBC's "Sounds of The Seventies", 11 March 1971) | 3:44 |
| 9. | "Love to Love You (And Tonight Pigs Will Fly)" (Recorded for the BBC's "Sounds of The Seventies", 11 March 1971) | 3:12 |
| 10. | "Nine Feet Underground" (Recorded for John Peel's Sunday Concert at the Paris Theatre, 6 May 1971) | 14:27 |
| 11. | "Feelin', Reelin', Squealin'" (Recorded for John Peel's Sunday Concert at the Paris Theatre, 6 May 1971) | 9:30 |

== Personnel ==
Caravan

- Richard Sinclair – bass guitar, acoustic guitar, vocals
- Pye Hastings – electric guitars, acoustic guitar, vocals
- Dave Sinclair – Hammond organ, piano, Mellotron, harmony vocals
- Richard Coughlan – drums and percussion

Additional personnel

- Jimmy Hastings – flute, tenor sax, piccolo
- Dave Grinsted – cannon, bell and wind
- John Beecham – trombone on "Golf Girl"

Production

- David Hitchcock – production
- Dave Grinsted – engineering
- John Punter – engineering
- Derek Varnals – engineering
- Julian Hastings – production for bonus material on 2001 CD reissue.

== Release information ==
| Year | Type | Label |
|---|---|---|
| 1971 | LP | Deram |
| 1971 | LP | London Records (US) |
| 1989 | CD | Decca |
| 2001 | CD | Universal International / Decca |
| 2011 | CD/DVD | Deram |

== Cover versions ==
"Golf Girl" was covered by Nigel Planer (in his guise as hippy Neil from The Young Ones) on his album Neil's Heavy Concept Album, and featured a cameo from Dawn French as a policewoman. Annie Whitehead played the song's trombone part as arranged on In the Land of Grey and Pink and longtime Caravan collaborator Jimmy Hastings played on the album.

== Sources ==
- Lambe, Stephen (2012). Citizens of Hope and Glory: The Story of Progressive Rock. Amberley Publishing. ISBN 978-1-445-60737-5.
- Martin, Bill (1998). Listening to the Future: The Time of Progressive Rock, 1968–1978. Open Court. ISBN 978-0-812-69368-3.
- Powell, Mark (2001). In the Land of Grey and Pink (Media notes). Decca /Universal. 8829832.
