= For Girls Who Grow Plump in the Night =

Studio album by Caravan
- Released: 5 October 1973
- Recorded: 1973
- Studios: Tollington Park Studios; Chipping Norton Recording Studios; Decca Studios, West Hampstead
- Genres: Progressive rock; Canterbury scene
- Length: 45:09
- Label: Deram
- Producer: David Hitchcock

Caravan chronology
Waterloo Lily (1972)	For Girls Who Grow Plump in the Night (1973)	Caravan and the New Symphonia (1974)

Professional ratings
Review scores
Source	Rating
AllMusic	4.5/5 stars

For Girls Who Grow Plump in the Night is the fifth studio album released by the Canterbury scene band Caravan. Richard Sinclair and Steve Miller left the band prior to the recording of this album. They were replaced by John G. Perry and the returning Dave Sinclair. Viola player Geoff Richardson was added to the band.

The name of the album is a pun on the phrase "things that go bump in the night". The full cover photo depicts a sleeping pregnant woman.

== Track listing ==
All songs composed by Pye Hastings, except where noted.

Side one
No.	Title	Length
1.	"Memory Lain, Hugh" "Headloss"	9:19
2.	"Hoedown"	3:10
3.	"Surprise, Surprise"	4:03
4.	"C'thlu Thlu"	6:10

Side two
No.	Title	Writer(s)	Length
5.	"The Dog, The Dog, He's at It Again"		5:53
6.	"Be All Right" "Chance of a Lifetime"		6:38
7.	"L'Auberge du Sanglier" "A Hunting We Shall Go" "Pengola" "Backwards" "A Hunting We Shall Go (reprise)"	Pye Hastings, John G. Perry, Mike Ratledge	9:56

Bonus tracks on 2001 CD rerelease
No.	Title	Writer(s)	Length
8.	"Memory Lain, Hugh" "Headloss"		9:18
9.	"No! (Be Alright)" "Waffle (Chance of a Lifetime)"		5:09
10.	"He Who Smelt It Dealt It (Memory Lain, Hugh)"		4:42
11.	"Surprise, Surprise"		3:15
12.	"Derek's Long Thing"	Richard Coughlan, Pye Hastings, Geoff Richardson, Derek Austin, Stuart Evans	10:57

== Personnel ==
Caravan

- Pye Hastings – electric and acoustic guitars, lead vocals
- Geoff Richardson – viola
- David Sinclair – Hammond organ, piano, electric piano, Davoli synthesizer, ARP synthesizer on (1 b)
- John G. Perry – bass, vocals, percussion
- Richard Coughlan – drums, percussion, timpani

Additional personnel

- Rupert Hine – ARP synthesizer (1a, b & 6)
- Frank Ricotti – congas (1 b, 2, 4, 7)
- Jimmy Hastings – flute (1)
- Pete King – flute, alto saxophone (1)
- Harry Klein – clarinet, baritone saxophone (1)
- Tony Coe – clarinet, tenor saxophone (1)
- Henry Lowther – trumpet (1)
- Chris Pyne – trombone (1)
- Barry Robinson – piccolo (1)
- Tom Whittle – clarinet, tenor saxophone (1)
- Jill Pryor – voice (4)
- Paul Buckmaster – electric cello (7)
- Orchestra arranged by John Bell and Martyn Ford, conducted by Martyn Ford

== Releases ==
Year	Type	Label	Catalog #
1973	LP	Deram	SDLR12
1973	LP	London	627
1991	CD	Polydor Records	PO 1836
1999	CD	Deram	820971
2001 remaster	CD	Decca	8829802
2001	CD	Decca	9060
2002	CD	Universal/Island	2392
2005	CD	Universal International	882980
2007	CD	Eclectic Discs	1303
2014	SACD	Universal	UIGY-9545
