= Caravan (band) =

English band from the Canterbury area

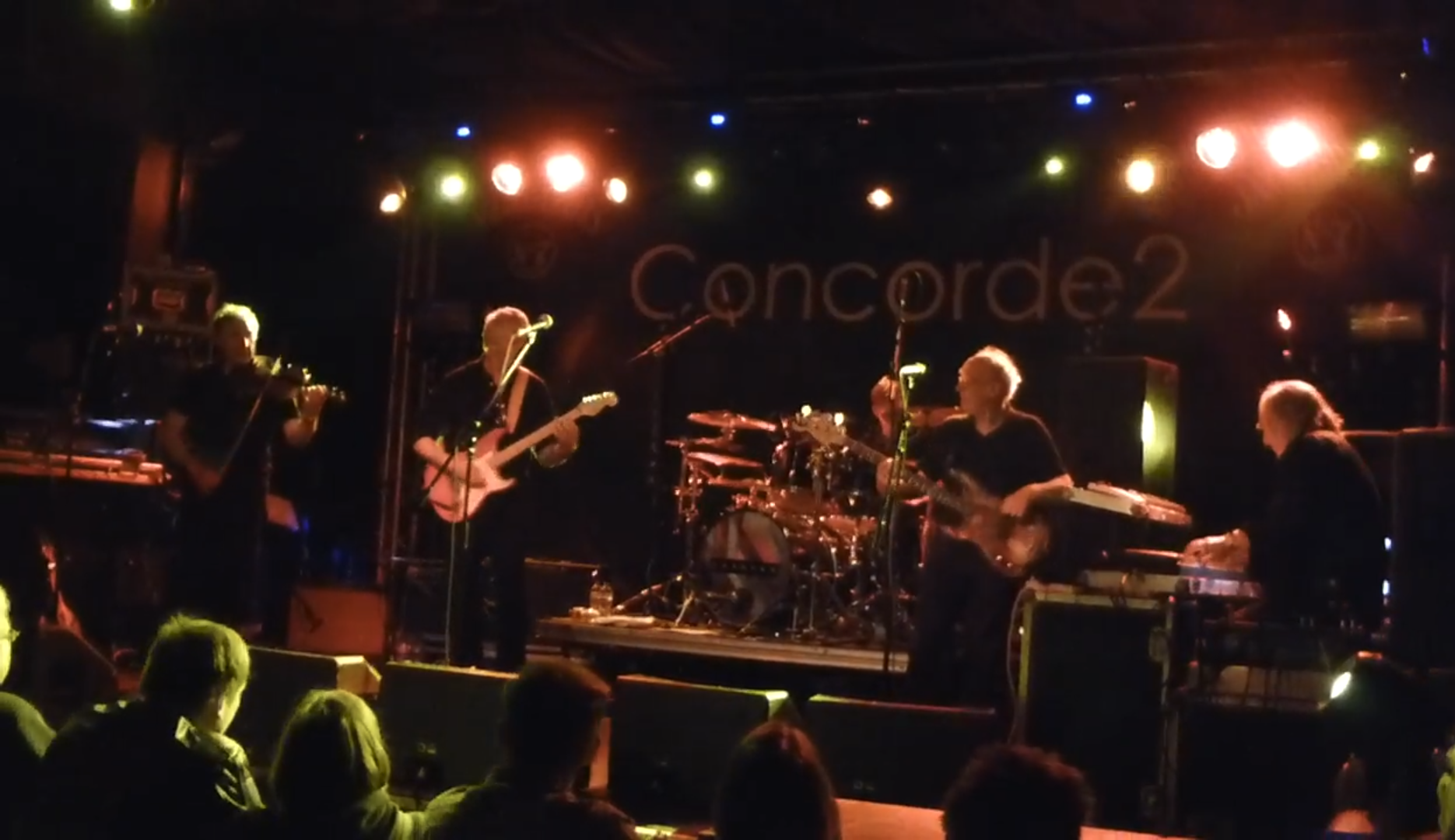
- Caravan in 2014

Background information
- Origin: Canterbury, Kent, England
- Genres: Progressive rock; Canterbury scene; psychedelic rock; jazz rock; progressive pop
- Years active: 1968–1978, 1980–1985, 1990–1992, 1995–present
- Spinoff of: The Wilde Flowers
- Members: Pye Hastings; Geoffrey Richardson; Jan Schelhaas; Mark Walker; Lee Pomeroy
- Past members: Richard Coughlan; Richard Sinclair; Dave Sinclair; Steve Miller; Derek Austin; Stuart Evans; John G. Perry; Mike Wedgwood; Dek Messecar; Doug Boyle; Simon Bentall; Jimmy Hastings; Jim Leverton
- Website: officialcaravan.co.uk

Caravan are an English rock band from the Canterbury area, founded by former Wilde Flowers members David Sinclair, Richard Sinclair, Pye Hastings, and Richard Coughlan in 1968. The band have never achieved the great commercial success that was widely predicted for them at the beginning of their career, but are nevertheless considered a key part of the Canterbury scene of progressive rock acts, blending psychedelic rock, jazz, and classical influences to create a distinctive sound.

The band were originally based in Whitstable, Kent, near Canterbury, but moved to London when briefly signed to Verve Records. After being dropped by Verve, the band signed to Decca Records, where they released their most critically acclaimed album, In the Land of Grey and Pink, in 1971. Dave Sinclair left after the album's release and the group split up the following year. Hastings and Coughlan added new members, notably viola player Geoffrey Richardson, continuing on before splitting in 1978.

The band re-formed several times in the following decades, and Caravan still remain active as a live band in the 21st century, despite Coughlan's death in December 2013.

== History ==
=== Early career ===
The group's original members, David Sinclair, Richard Sinclair, Pye Hastings and Richard Coughlan, had all been in the Canterbury-based Wilde Flowers, albeit not at the same time. Richard Sinclair had been an early member, but left in September 1965 to study at college. Hastings had replaced Robert Wyatt as the group's singer and Coughlan as drummer in the band when Wyatt, who performed both roles, formed Soft Machine. David Sinclair joined the group in late 1966, but after future Soft Machine member Hugh Hopper left the group in June the following year, they began to run out of momentum and broke up in October 1967.

Coughlan, Hastings and the two Sinclairs subsequently formed Caravan in 1968. "We all had the same goal" recalled Richard Sinclair, "to make our music, write it ourselves, and make a living from it." The band rented a house in Whitstable, Kent for six months, where they began to write and rehearse new material. They also borrowed Soft Machine's PA for rehearsals while that band was on tour with Jimi Hendrix in the US, as Caravan did not have enough funds for their own equipment. They were forced to leave in June and ended up living in tents and rehearsing in a local church hall. By October, they had attracted the interest of music publisher Ian Ralfini, who signed them to the American record label Verve Records, the first British act they signed. Verve subsequently released the band's debut LP, Caravan (1969), the following year, but a few months later moved out of the UK record business and dropped the band.

After a series of gigs in London, including the Speakeasy Club, the band were introduced to Terry King, who became the group's first manager. David Hitchcock, who had been working in the art department of Decca Records, asked the company's president, Hugh Mendl, to sign the band. They began recording their second album, If I Could Do It All Over Again, I'd Do It All Over You (1970), in September 1969, while continuing to gig on the university circuit, and appearing at festivals alongside Pink Floyd, Yes, The Nice and Soft Machine. Recording If I could ... continued in February 1970, with the 14-minute track "For Richard", showing the band's contrast in styles and jazz-rock influence. The album was released in August, alongside an appearance at the Plumpton Festival with Van der Graaf Generator, Yes and Colosseum. The accompanying single "Hello Hello" helped them land an appearance on the TV show Top of the Pops, performing the album's title track.

Caravan had started to build a live following by mid-1970, including an appearance at the Kralingen Pop Festival in the Netherlands to an audience of 250,000 and the 10th Plumpton Festival. In autumn 1970, Caravan began working on one of their most critically acclaimed albums, In the Land of Grey and Pink (1971). The balance of songwriting changed from the previous two albums, with Richard Sinclair taking a more prominent role. His song "Golf Girl" was originally written about his then girlfriend (and future wife), but the lyrics were rewritten in the final version. The group decided to follow up "For Richard" with a suite of short sections of songs written by David Sinclair, that the rest of the band worked on and linked together to form a side-long track, "Nine Feet Underground". Although the track was recorded in five separate stages and spliced together, the band performed the suite live as it was finally presented on the album, and it remained a popular track in their live set. The album was released in April 1971, and though it did not chart, it has remained in print ever since, and has been remastered for CD several times, notably a digital remaster in 2011 by Porcupine Tree's Steven Wilson. "Nine Feet Underground" in particular was a regular fixture on late-night FM radio during the early 1970s.

Despite the critical success of In the Land of Grey and Pink, the group were disappointed by its lack of commercial success, believing that Decca were not promoting the band properly or investing enough money. In August 1971, David Sinclair accepted a job with former Soft Machine drummer Robert Wyatt's new band, Matching Mole. Reflecting on the decision to leave, Sinclair later said, "I felt the whole thing was going a bit stagnant ... I wanted to play with other people, but had to accept that with Caravan it was either all or nothing." Hastings remembers that "Dave's departure was a serious blow."

=== Line-up changes ===
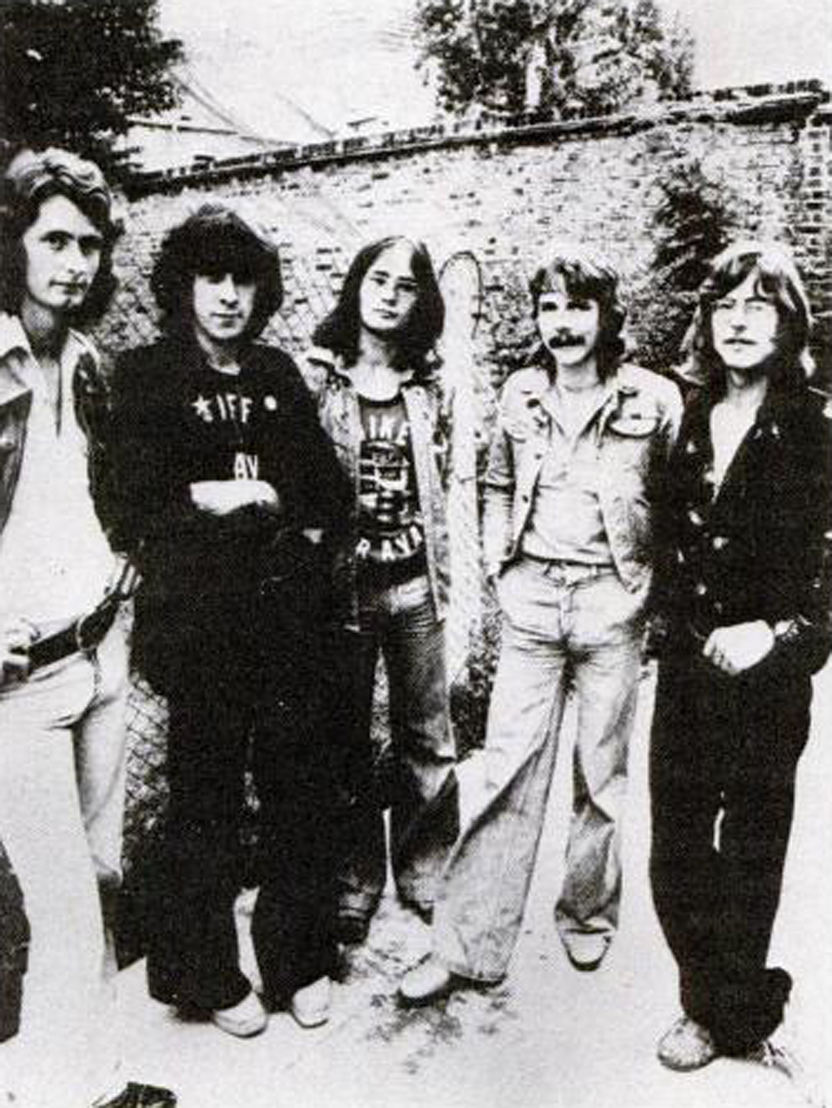
Caravan in 1974. From left to right: Pye Hastings, Geoffrey Richardson, Mike Wedgwood, Richard Coughlan, Dave Sinclair.

The remaining members continued on together and Richard Sinclair invited keyboardist Steve Miller to join the band. However, it was immediately apparent that the style of the band would be different. Sinclair and Miller wanted to perform more jazz-rock, while Hastings was frustrated that the previous style was being neglected, and that it was "virtually impossible" to get Miller to perform in David Sinclair's style. The band started recording a new album, Waterloo Lily (1972) in late 1971, which was the first use of orchestral instrumentation, arranged by Hastings and his brother, Jimmy, who had guested on previous albums. The album was released in May 1972, but by this time, musical differences had come to a head, and after a gig with Genesis in July, the band split. Richard Sinclair later said, "It didn't quite work with Steve in the band because the music started to go a bit too loose for the way that Pye and Richard Coughlan played."

Hastings and Coughlan decided to continue as Caravan, and the duo recruited viola player Geoffrey Richardson, bassist Stu Evans and keyboardist Derek Austin and toured extensively. This line-up did not release any recordings before Evans was replaced by John G. Perry and Dave Sinclair rejoined the group in 1973.

The resulting album For Girls Who Grow Plump in the Night (1973) was a major critical achievement and showed that the group could survive the loss of co-vocalist Richard Sinclair. Jimmy Hastings reprised his role as orchestrator along with Martyn Ford and John Bell, while the Soft Machine's Mike Ratledge contributed an instrumental piece, "Backwards" as part of a medley. The group followed this with a live album, Caravan and the New Symphonia (1974), including orchestral arrangements by Ford and conducting by Simon Jeffes.

Perry left after the New Symphonia and was replaced by Mike Wedgwood for the album Cunning Stunts (1975), which reached the top 50 in the UK and was a minor hit in the US, reaching number 124. It was the last album released on Decca, which preceded a number of other problems in the band. David Sinclair left after the album was recorded and was replaced by Jan Schelhaas, with the band's sound becoming more mainstream. The group signed to Miles Copeland's BTM Records and recorded Blind Dog at St. Dunstans (1976), which was another minor album hit, but by this point the group were out of step with the prevailing musical trends, and after a final album, Better by Far (1977) on Arista Records, the group split.

=== 1980-2000 ===
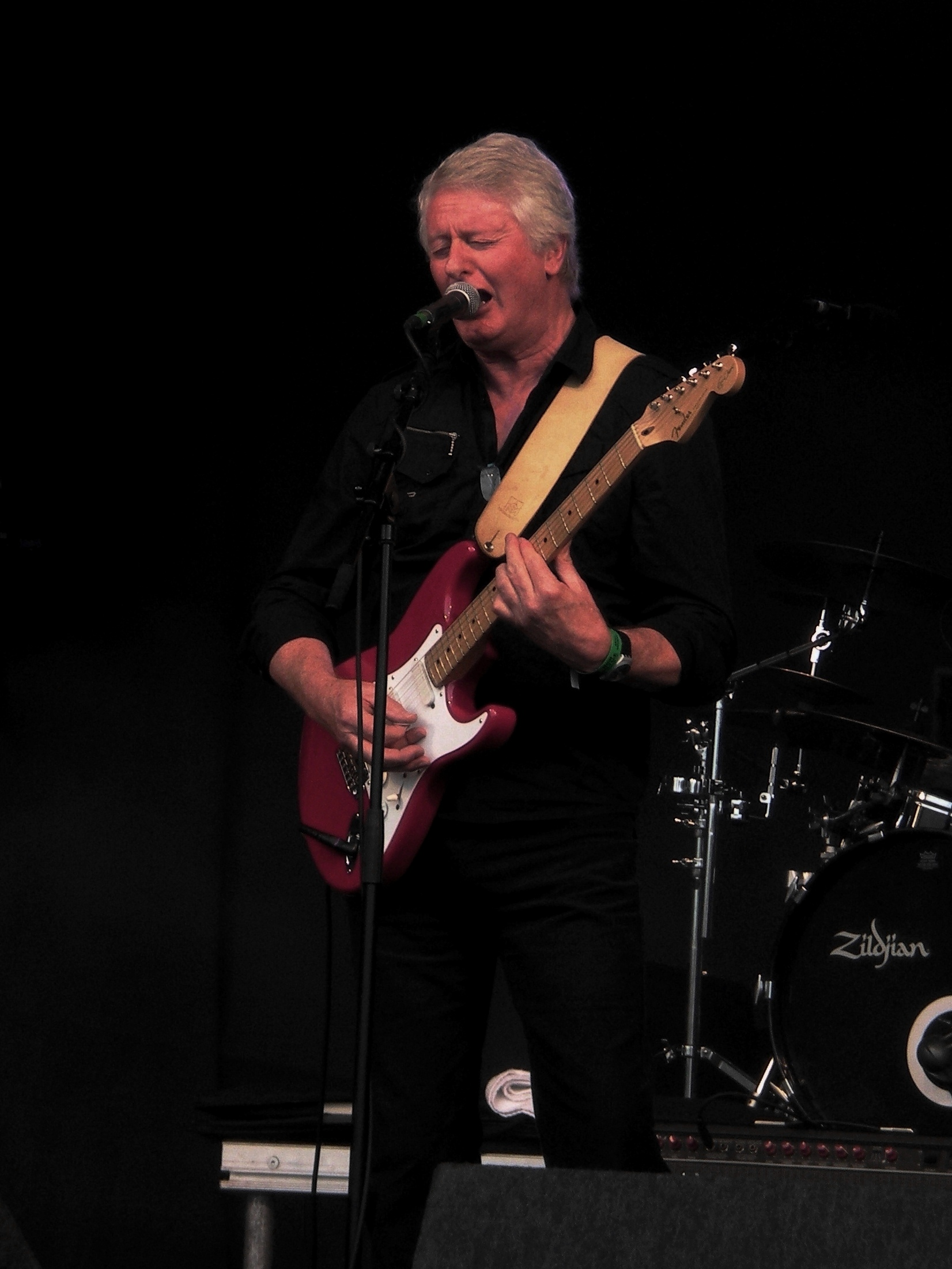
Pye Hastings performing with Caravan at the High Voltage Festival in 2011

In 1980 Caravan resumed recording and activity and recorded The Album with a lineup that included Dek Messecar on bass and vocals; David Sinclair, keyboards; Richard Coughlan, drums; Geoff Richardson, viola, guitars, vocals, and flute; and Pye Hastings, guitar and vocals. The single taken from "Heartbreaker" returned the group to the charts in the UK and they had some TV appearances in France. Although this formation did not last long, since the following year the group was restructured again with the original formation and they recorded a version of "Back to Front" with the addition of Mel Collins on sax. The band were largely dormant in the 1980s until a 1990 reunion, planned as a one-off for television, reinvigorated their career. The group continued to tour in the early 1990s, before Richard Sinclair left. He was replaced by Jim Leverton, while Geoffrey Richardson rejoined the band. This version of the group released The Battle of Hastings in 1995.

=== 21st century ===
The group continued to play into the 21st century. They have also achieved steady sales and a fan following with the support of Stuart Maconie's "Freak Zone" show on BBC 6 Music. After performing at NEARFest in 2002, they released The Unauthorized Breakfast Item album in 2003, where David Sinclair was replaced by a returning Jan Schelhaas. An archive collection of BBC sessions from 1968 to 1975, The Show of Our Lives, was released in 2007.

In 2010, Pye Hastings announced that the band had resumed activity in anticipation of a one-off concert recording at Metropolis Studios for ITV, which took place in December 2010. New material was written for a debut performance and the band was joined by Mark Walker on drums and percussion, as Richard Coughlan, whilst still a member of the band, was too ill to tour with the group. The DVD of this gig was released in May 2011 and the recording was shown on ITV as part of the Legends series.

In January 2013, the band completed a successful UK tour to celebrate the 40th anniversary of the album For Girls Who Grow Plump in the Night (1973). This was followed later in the year by the announcement of a new album, Paradise Filter (2013). The album was funded by a PledgeMusic campaign, scheduled for release on 24 February 2014. Hastings declared, "now you can be part of the whole process by pledging to support this project".

On 1 December 2013, founding member Coughlan died, having been in poor health for some years. His funeral took place in Canterbury on 20 December. A statement from the band stated, "his unique style of playing and wonderful character will be sorely missed."

Caravan headlined the Rites of Spring festival (RoSfest) festival in Pennsylvania, USA from 2 to 4 May 2014.

In 2021, Jim Leverton left the band to return to his R&B roots. His replacement is Lee Pomeroy.

== Musical style ==
Caravan are considered a key example of the Canterbury scene genre. Their records generally indicate a jazz influence, and the group's lyrics have been described as whimsical and very "English", particularly during Richard Sinclair's tenure in the band. Following Sinclair's departure, the musical direction has been predominantly led by Pye Hastings, who preferred a softer pop rock approach. Though the group share a common history with Soft Machine, they have been considered more melodic and closer to folk music and frequently displaying a sense of humour. The group were predominantly album-oriented, but Hastings believes the group recorded enough straightforward pop that could have been hit singles if the record company had taken sufficient interest.

Instrumentally, David Sinclair's fuzztone Hammond organ sound is a key ingredient of the early Caravan albums, and his playing is the dominant instrument on them. His musical palette subsequently expanded to include synthesizers. Jimmy Hastings' woodwind playing and orchestral arrangements have also been a regular feature in the band's music since its inception.

== Personnel ==
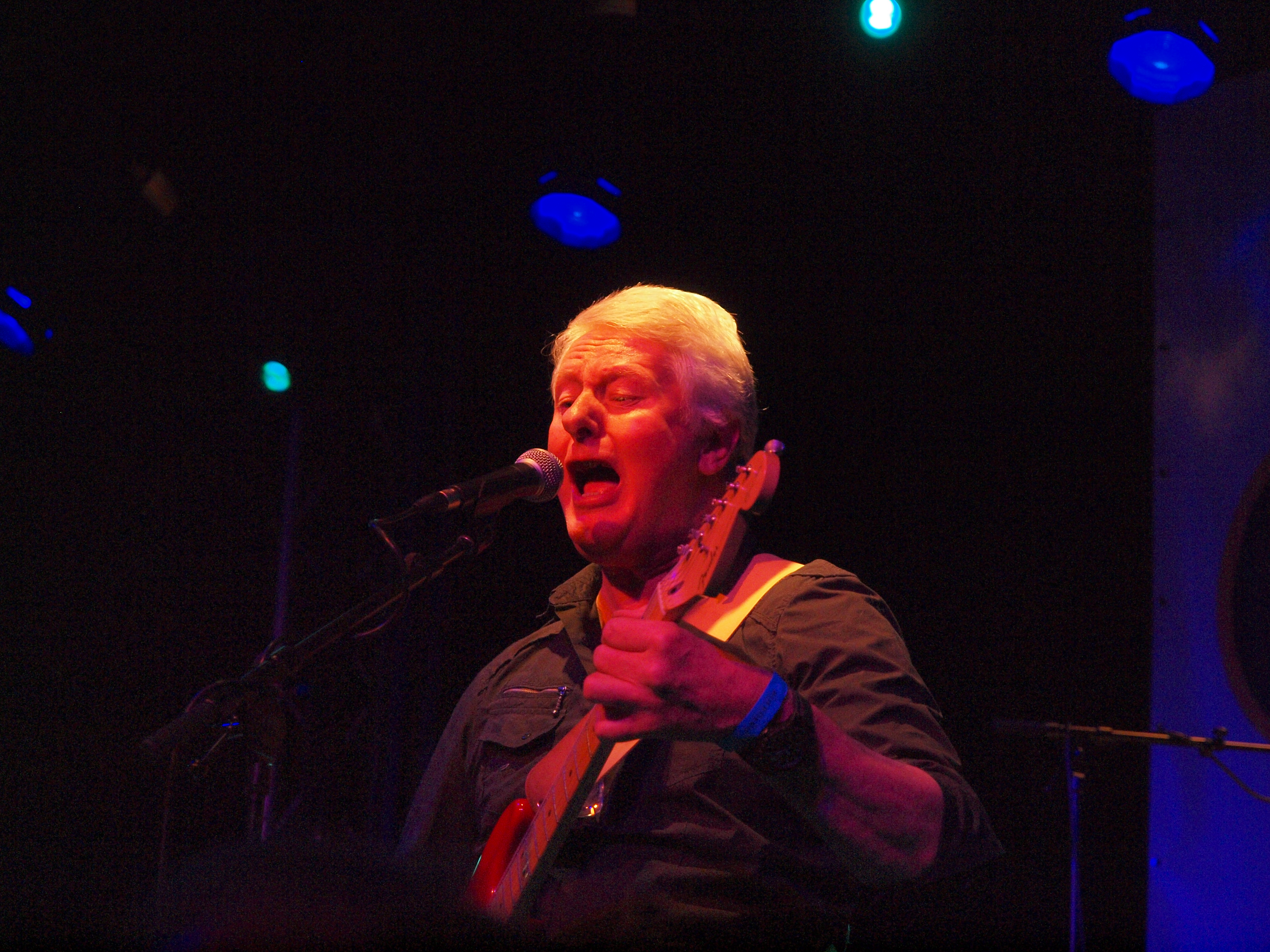
Hastings

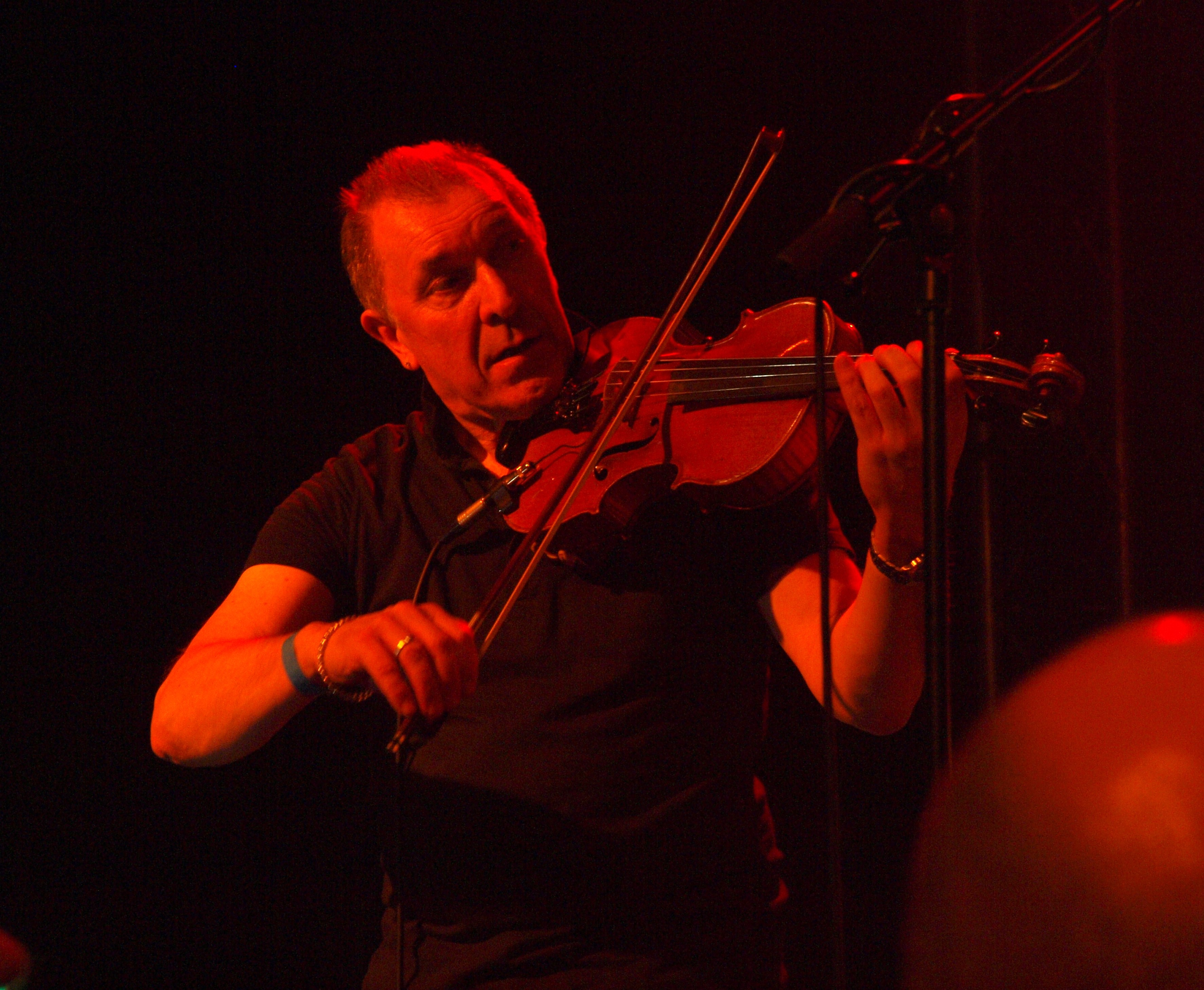
Richardson

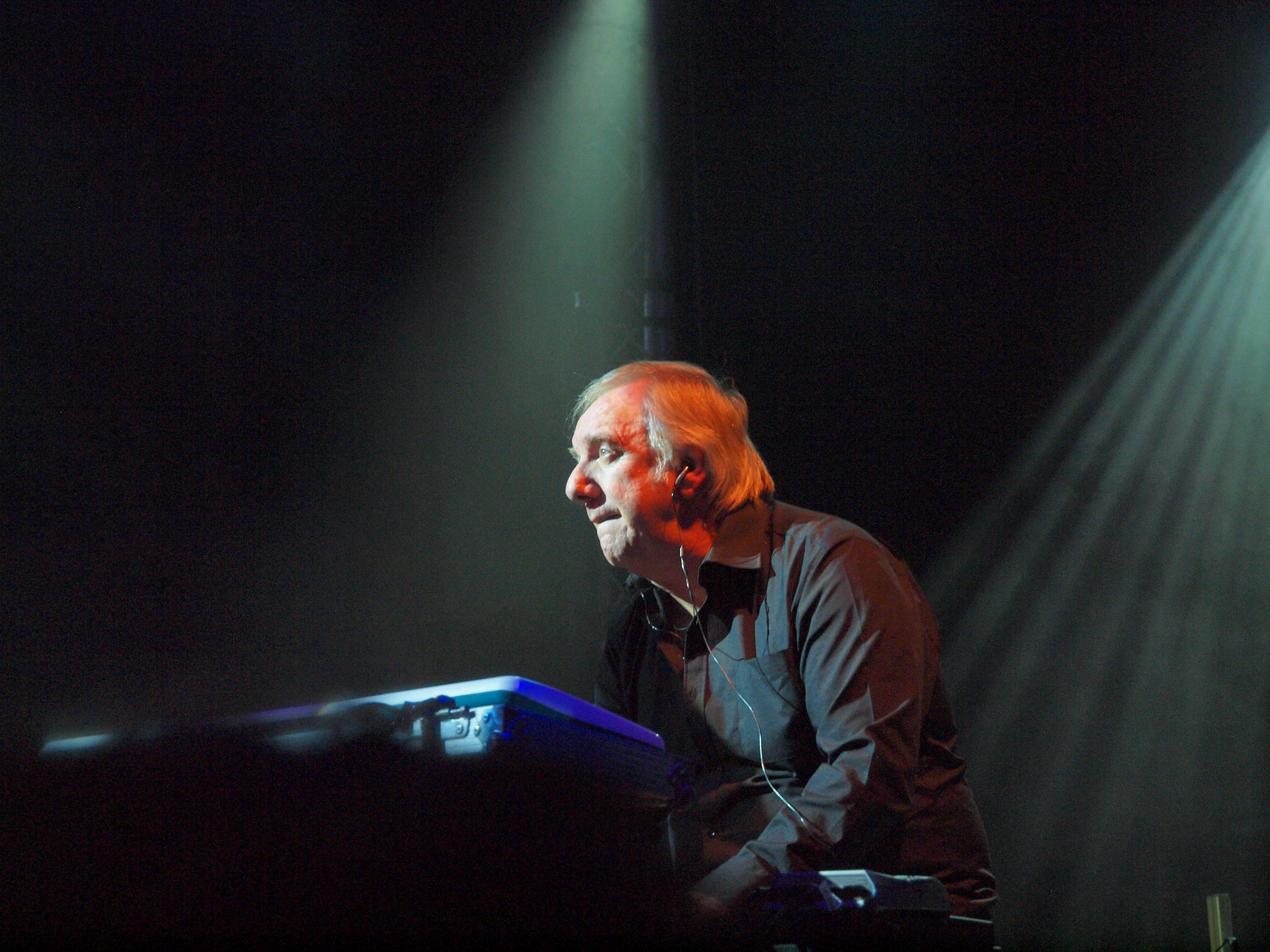
Schelhaas

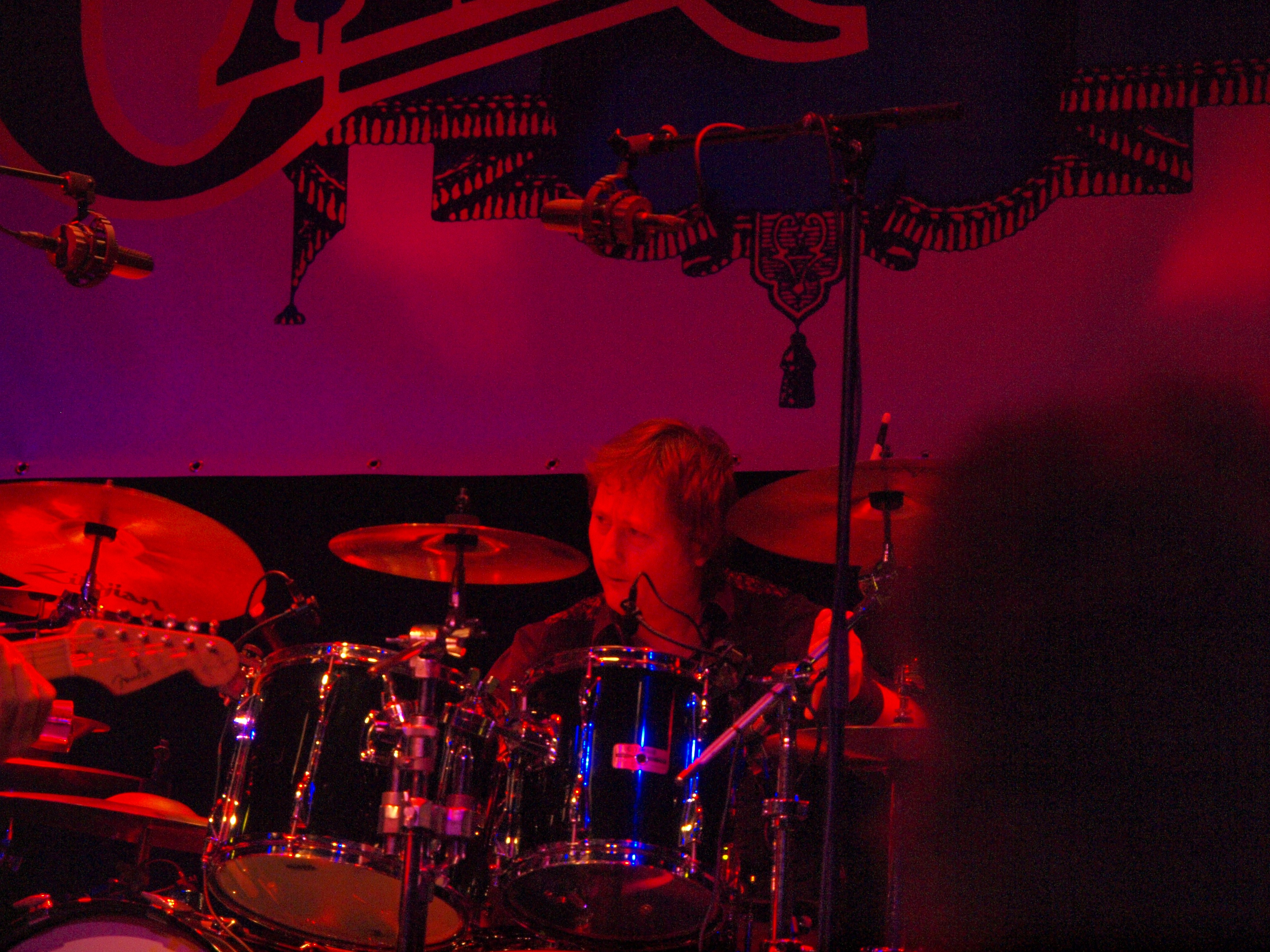
Walker

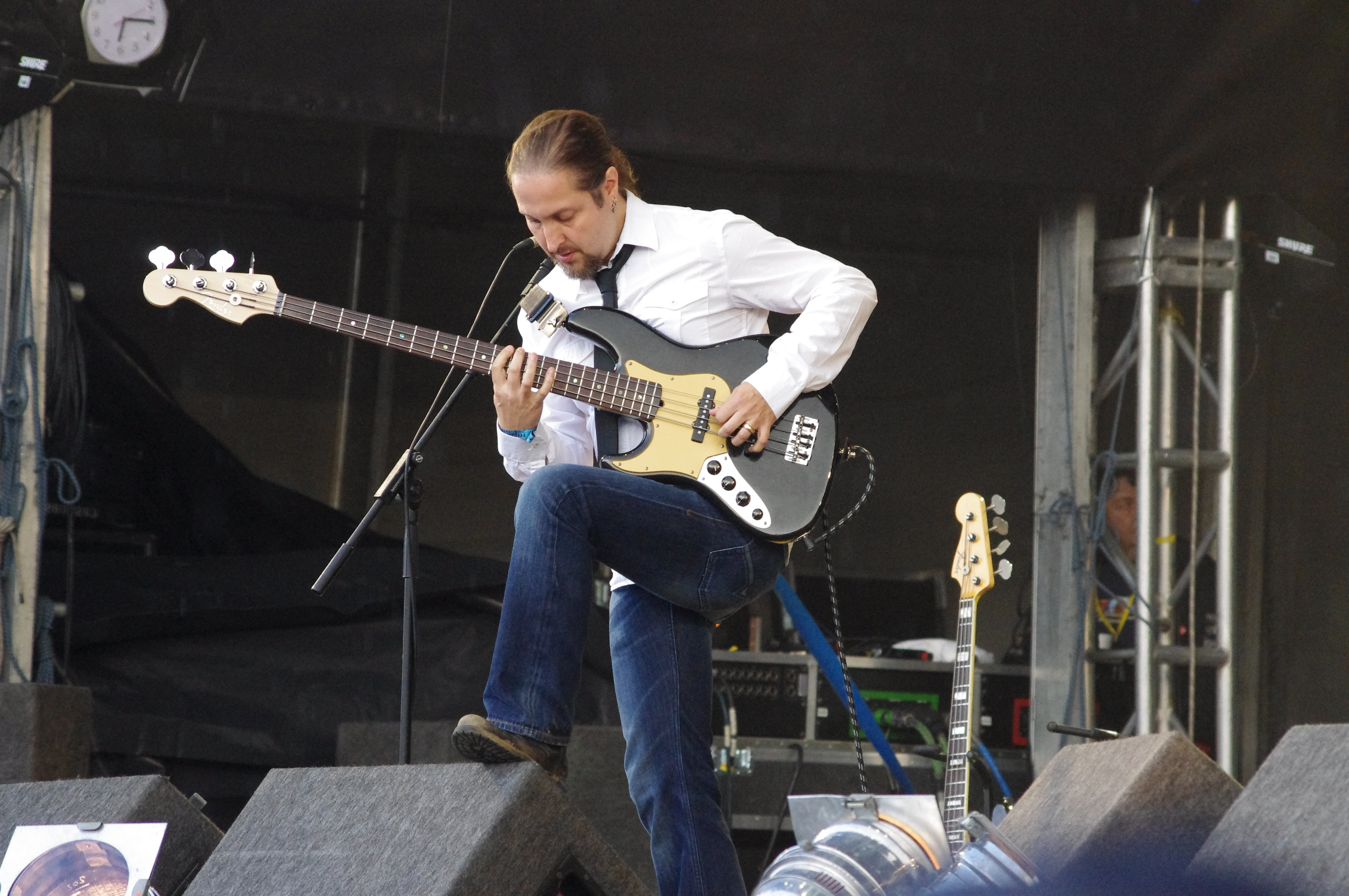
Pomeroy

=== Members ===
Current members

- Pye Hastings – guitar, vocals, bass (1968–1978, 1980–1985, 1990–1992, 1995–present)
- Geoffrey Richardson – guitar, viola, flute, violin, cello, clarinet, mandolin, vocals (1972–1978, 1980–1981, 1995–1996, 1997–present)
- Jan Schelhaas – keyboards, backing vocals (1975–1978, 2002–present)
- Mark Walker – drums, percussion (2010–present)
- Lee Pomeroy – bass, backing vocals (2021–present)

Former members

- Richard Coughlan – drums, percussion (1968–1978, 1980–1985, 1990–1992, 1995–2013; his death)
- Richard Sinclair – bass, vocals, guitar (1968–1972, 1981–1985, 1990–1992)
- Dave Sinclair – keyboards, vocals (1968–1971, 1973–1975, 1980–1985, 1990–1992, 1995–2002)
- Steve Miller – keyboards (1971–1972)
- Stuart Evans – bass (1972–1973)
- John G. Perry – bass, vocals, percussion (1973–1974)
- Mike Wedgwood – bass, vocals, congas, synthesizers (1974–1976)
- Dek Messecar – bass, backing vocals (1976–1978, 1980–1981)
- Doug Boyle – guitar (1996–2007)
- Simon Bentall – percussion (1996–1997)
- Jimmy Hastings – flute, saxophone (1996–1997, plus session and live contributions 1968–1978, 1990–1992, 1995–2024; his death)
- Jim Leverton – bass, vocals (1995–2021)

=== Lineups ===
January 1968 – August 1971	August 1971 – July 1972	August 1972 – February 1973	March 1973 – July 1974
Pye Hastings – guitar, vocals, bass; Richard Sinclair – bass, vocals, guitar; Dave Sinclair – keyboards, backing vocals; Richard Coughlan – drums, percussion	Pye Hastings – guitar, vocals; Richard Sinclair – bass, vocals; Richard Coughlan – drums, percussion; Steve Miller – keyboards	Pye Hastings – guitar, vocals; Richard Coughlan – drums, percussion; Derek Austin – keyboards; Stuart Evans – bass; Geoffrey Richardson – guitar, viola, violin, vocals	Pye Hastings – guitar, vocals; Richard Coughlan – drums, percussion; Geoffrey Richardson – guitar, viola, violin, vocals; Dave Sinclair – keyboards; John G. Perry – bass, vocals, percussion
July 1974 – June 1975	July 1975 – December 1976	January 1977 – April 1978	April 1978 – Early 1980
Pye Hastings – guitar, vocals; Richard Coughlan – drums, percussion; Geoffrey Richardson – guitar, viola, violin, vocals; Dave Sinclair – keyboards; Mike Wedgwood – bass, vocals, congas, synthesizers	Pye Hastings – guitar, vocals; Richard Coughlan – drums, percussion; Geoffrey Richardson – guitar, viola, violin, vocals; Mike Wedgwood – bass, vocals; Jan Schelhaas – keyboards, backing vocals	Pye Hastings – guitar, vocals; Richard Coughlan – drums, percussion; Geoffrey Richardson – guitar, viola, violin, vocals; Jan Schelhaas – keyboards, backing vocals; Dek Messecar – bass, backing vocals	Disbanded
Early 1980 – October 1981	November 1981 – October 1984	November 1984 – December 1989	January 1990 – November 1991
Pye Hastings – guitar, vocals; Richard Coughlan – drums, percussion; Geoffrey Richardson – guitar, viola, violin, vocals; Dek Messecar – bass, backing vocals; Dave Sinclair – keyboards, vocals	Pye Hastings – guitar, vocals; Richard Coughlan – drums, percussion; Dave Sinclair – keyboards, vocals; Richard Sinclair – bass, vocals, guitar	Disbanded	Pye Hastings – guitar, vocals; Richard Coughlan – drums, percussion; Dave Sinclair – keyboards; Richard Sinclair – bass, vocals
December 1991 – March 1995	April 1995 – August 1996	September 1996 – August 1997	September 1997 – October 2002
Disbanded	Pye Hastings – guitar, vocals; Richard Coughlan – drums, percussion; Dave Sinclair – keyboards, backing vocals; Geoffrey Richardson – guitar, viola, violin, backing vocals; Jim Leverton – bass, vocals	Pye Hastings – guitar, vocals; Richard Coughlan – drums; Dave Sinclair – keyboards, backing vocals; Jim Leverton – bass, vocals; Doug Boyle – guitar; Jimmy Hastings – flute, saxophone; Simon Bentall – percussion	Pye Hastings – guitar, vocals; Richard Coughlan – drums, percussion; Dave Sinclair – keyboards, backing vocals; Jim Leverton – bass, vocals; Doug Boyle – guitar; Geoffrey Richardson – guitar, viola, violin, backing vocals
October 2002 – June 2007	June 2007 – December 2010	December 2010 – December 2013	December 2013 – May 2021
Pye Hastings – guitar, vocals; Richard Coughlan – drums, percussion; Jim Leverton – bass, vocals; Doug Boyle – guitar; Geoffrey Richardson – guitar, viola, violin, backing vocals; Jan Schelhaas – keyboards, backing vocals	Pye Hastings – guitar, vocals; Richard Coughlan – drums, percussion; Jim Leverton – bass, vocals; Geoffrey Richardson – guitar, viola, violin, backing vocals; Jan Schelhaas – keyboards, backing vocals	Pye Hastings – guitar, vocals; Richard Coughlan – percussion; Jim Leverton – bass, vocals; Geoffrey Richardson – guitar, viola, violin, vocals; Jan Schelhaas – keyboards, backing vocals; Mark Walker – drums	Pye Hastings – guitar, vocals; Jim Leverton – bass, vocals; Geoffrey Richardson – guitar, viola, violin, vocals; Jan Schelhaas – keyboards, backing vocals; Mark Walker – drums, percussion
June 2021 – Present
Pye Hastings – guitar, vocals; Geoffrey Richardson – guitar, viola, violin, backing vocals; Jan Schelhaas – keyboards, backing vocals; Mark Walker – drums, percussion; Lee Pomeroy – bass, backing vocals (guest in 2021)

== Discography ==
=== Studio albums ===
- Caravan (1969)
- If I Could Do It All Over Again, I'd Do It All Over You (1970)
- In the Land of Grey and Pink (1971)
- Waterloo Lily (1972)
- For Girls Who Grow Plump in the Night (1973)
- Cunning Stunts (1975)
- Blind Dog at St. Dunstans (1976)
- Better by Far (1977)
- The Album (1980)
- Back to Front (1982)
- Cool Water (1994)
- The Battle of Hastings (1995)
- The Unauthorized Breakfast Item (2003)
- Paradise Filter (2013)
- It’s None of Your Business (2021)

=== Live albums ===
- Caravan and the New Symphonia (1974)
- BBC Radio 1 Live in Concert (1991)
- Live in Holland: Back on the Tracks (1998)
- Live 1990 (1992)
- Songs for Oblivion Fishermen (compilation of BBC recordings, 1998)
- Ether Way (compilation of BBC recordings, 1998)
- The Show of Our Lives (compilation of BBC recordings, 1998)
- Live: Canterbury Comes to London (1999)
- Surprise Supplies (1999)
- Bedrock in Concert (2002)
- Green Bottles for Marjorie: The Lost BBC Sessions (compilation of BBC recordings, 2002)
- Live at the Fairfield Halls, 1974 (2002)
- A Night's Tale (2003)
- Nowhere to Hide (2003)
- With Strings Attached (2003)
- Live UK Tour 1975 (recorded at the University of Nottingham) (2003)
- The Show of Our Lives – Caravan at the BBC 1968–1975 (compilation of BBC recordings, 2007)
- A Hunting We Shall Go: Live In 1974 (2008)
- Caravan - Recorded Live in Concert at Metropolis Studios, London (CD/DVD, 2012)

=== Compilations ===
- Canterbury Tales (1977)
- The Show of Our Lives (1981)
- Songs and Signs (1991)
- The Best of Caravan – Canterbury Tales (1994 - expanded reissue of 1977 version)
- All Over You (1997)
- Travelling Man (1998)
- Headloss (1999)
- All Over You...Too (2000)
- Travelling Ways: The HTD Anthology (2000)
- Where but for Caravan Would I? (2000)
- The World Is Yours (4-CD box set, 2010)
- Back Catalogue Songs (2013)
- Who Do You Think We Are (2021) (35 CD + DVD and Blu-ray disc box set)

=== UK Singles ===
- "Place of My Own" (1969)
- "If I Could Do It All Over Again I'd Do It All Over You" (1970)
- "Love to Love You" (1971)
- "Stuck in a Hole" (1975)
- "All the Way" (1976)
- "Better by Far" (1977)
- "Heartbreaker" (1980)
- "Keepin' Up de Fences" (1980)

== Filmography ==
- 2002: A Night's Tale - Live in the USA (CD/DVD)
- 2003: A Knight in London (DVD)
- 2004: The Ultimate Anthology (DVD)
- 2005: The 35th Anniversary Concert (DVD)
- 2011: Filmed Live at Metropolis Studios (DVD)
- 2012: Recorded Live in Concert at Metropolis Studios, London (CD/DVD)
- 2014: Caravan Live at RoSFEST, Gettysburg, USA (DVD)
- 2015: Romantic Warriors III: Canterbury Tales (DVD)
- 2015: Access All Areas (CD/DVD)

== Bibliography ==
- Bennett, Graham (2005). Soft Machine: Out-bloody-rageous. SAF Publishing Ltd. ISBN 978-0-946719-84-6.
- Hinton, Brian (2003). Buckley, Peter (ed.). The Rough Guide to Rock. Rough Guides. ISBN 978-1-84353-105-0.
- Irvin, Jim (2007). The Mojo Collection: The Ultimate Music Companion. Canongate Books. ISBN 978-1-84195-973-3.
- Martin, Bill (1998). Listening to the Future: The Time of Progressive Rock, 1968–1978. Open Court Publishing. ISBN 978-0-8126-9368-3.
- Romano, Will (2010). Mountains Come Out of the Sky: The Illustrated History of Prog Rock. Backbeat Books. ISBN 978-1-61713-375-6.
