= Jimmy Hastings =

British musician (1938–2024)

James Brian Gordon Hastings (12 May 1938 – 18 March 2024) was a British musician associated with the Canterbury scene who played saxophones, flute and clarinet.

== Early life ==
Hastings was born in Aberdeen, Scotland. He started playing the saxophone at aged 16 after having started playing piano. He auditioned unsuccessfully to play tenor saxophone with Leslie Thorpe's band at the Beach Ballroom in Aberdeen and later with Humphrey Lyttelton. He then worked as a musician on ships.

== Career ==
On returning to England he played first tenor saxophone with the Ken Mackintosh band. After 2 years he joined the BBC Radio Orchestra. He played with the Bill Le Sage trio at The Bull's Head, Barnes. He left the BBC after four years to become a freelance musician.

He played with his brother Pye Hastings in Caravan, with Soft Machine, Hatfield and the North, National Health, Bryan Ferry, Trapeze, Chris Squire, among others. He played alto saxophone, clarinet and flute with Humphrey Lyttelton's eight-piece jazz band. With the other members of the Lyttelton band, he performed on the 2001 Radiohead album Amnesiac. Hastings died on 18 March 2024, at the age of 85.

== Discography ==
John Horler & Jimmy Hastings

- Point of Intersection (1986)

Caravan

- Caravan (1969)
- If I Could Do It All Over Again, I'd Do It All Over You (1970)
- In the Land of Grey and Pink (1971)
- Waterloo Lily (1972)
- For Girls Who Grow Plump in the Night (1973)
- Caravan and the New Symphonia (1974)
- Cunning Stunts (1975)
- Blind Dog at St. Dunstans (1976)
- The Battle of Hastings (1995)

Hatfield and the North

- The Rotters' Club (1975)

National Health

- National Health (1978)
- Of Queues and Cures (1978)

Soft Machine

- Third (1970)
- Fourth (1971)

Todd Dillingham

- The Wilde Canterbury Dream (1992)

Trapeze

- You Are the Music...We're Just the Band (1972)
- The Final Swing (1974)
