= John G. Perry =

British bass guitarist and singer (born 1947)

- Born: John Gerald Perry; 19 January 1947 (age 79); Auburn, New York, U.S.
- Genres: Progressive rock
- Occupation: Musician
- Instrument: Bass
- Years active: 1967–present

John G. Perry (born 19 January 1947 in Auburn, New York, United States) is an American-born British bass guitarist and singer. He was born in the U.S. to British parents and when he was young, the family moved back to England.

Perry's first band of note was Gringo, originally called Utopia, which released an eponymous album in 1971, with future Sailor keyboard player Henry Marsh. A brief stint touring with Spreadeagle followed until Perry was asked to join Caravan, with whom Gringo had done a UK tour.

In 1973–74 he played with Caravan, with whom he recorded one studio album, For Girls Who Grow Plump in the Night (1973), and one live album, Caravan and the New Symphonia (1974). He also appears on various collections of BBC radio recordings released in subsequent years.

He left Caravan to concentrate on a new band venture, Quantum Jump, led by keyboardist, vocalist and producer Rupert Hine, and consisting of musicians who had initially assembled to play together on studio sessions. The band had a belated hit with a re-release of their single "The Lone Ranger".

In 1976 Perry released his first solo album, Sunset Wading, with an all-star cast of Geoff Richardson (Caravan) on viola and flute, Rupert Hine on keyboards and production, Michael Giles on drums, Morris Pert on percussion and two members of the Italian jazz-rock band Nova. The album was well received and moderately successful, and the same line-up recorded a follow-up album, Seabird, which was to remain unreleased for over 15 years.

During the second half of the 1970s he collaborated with Gordon Giltrap and Anthony Phillips on several studio albums, and also played on albums by Kevin Ayers and Curved Air.

In 1978, he got together with guitarist-vocalist Mick Rogers (ex-Manfred Mann's Earth Band), drummer Clive Bunker (ex-Jethro Tull/Steve Hillage) and reeds player Jack Lancaster (ex-Blodwyn Pig) to form Aviator, which released a couple of albums and toured around Europe.

In the early 1980s, he toured with Sally Oldfield, and he features on her 1982 live album, but he then quit touring to concentrate on library music.

The first ever Wal bass guitar was produced by John Perry's friend Ian Waller to Perry's specifications.

== Discography ==
- Gringo (Gringo, 1971)
- Solid Ground (Dave Elliott, 1973)
- For Girls Who Grow Plump in the Night (Caravan, 1973)
- Caravan and the New Symphonia (Caravan, 1974)
- The Confessions of Dr. Dream and Other Stories (Kevin Ayers, 1974)
- Midnight Wire (Curved Air, 1975)
- Sunset Wading (John G. Perry, 1976)
- Visionary (Gordon Giltrap, 1976)
- Flyaway (Nutshell, 1977)
- Perilous Journey (Gordon Giltrap, 1977)
- Round the Back (Café Jacques, 1977)
- Progress (Michael Giles, 1978)
- Fear of the Dark (Gordon Giltrap, 1978)
- Wise After the Event (Anthony Phillips, 1978)
- International (Café Jacques, 1978)
- Lone Ranger (Quantum Jump, (1976)
- Sides (Anthony Phillips, 1979)
- Aviator (Aviator, 1979)
- Turbulence (Aviator, 1980)
- The Virgin (Adrian Snell, 1981)
- Daybreak (Paul Field, 1983)
- Seabird (John G. Perry, 1995)
- Songs for Oblivion Fishermen (Caravan, 1998)
