= Dave Sinclair =

British musician (born 1947)

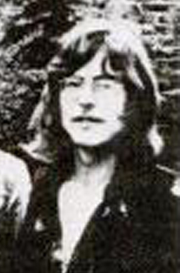

Background information
- Born: 21 November 1947 (age 78); Herne Bay, Kent, England
- Genre: Rock
- Instrument: Keyboards
- Years active: 1960s–present
- Formerly of: The Wilde Flowers, Caravan

David Sinclair (born 24 November 1947) is a British keyboardist (organ, piano, harpsichord, electric piano, Mellotron, Davolisint, etc.) associated with the psychedelic/progressive rock Canterbury Scene since the late 1960s. He became famous with the band Caravan and was responsible as a songwriter for creating some of their best-known tracks: "For Richard", "Nine Feet Underground", "The Dabsong Conshirtoe", "Proper Job/Back to Front".

== Biography ==
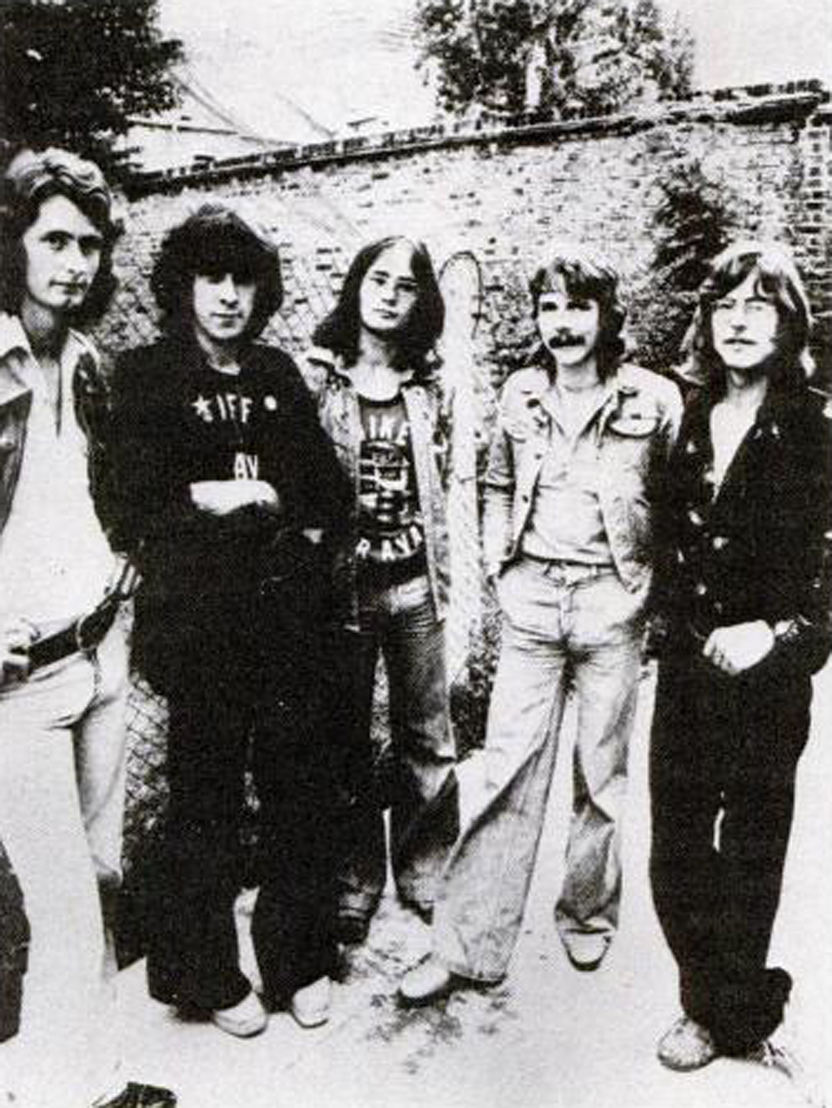
Dave Sinclair (far right) as part of the band Caravan in 1974

Sinclair was born in Herne Bay, Kent, England. Having started his musical career 1966–67 with the Wilde Flowers, he founded Caravan in 1968 with his cousin Richard Sinclair (bass/vocals), Pye Hastings (guitar/vocals), and Richard Coughlan (drums) and was in and out of the band for 35 years (so far 1968–71, 1973–75, 1979–82, 1990–2002). Over the course of Caravan's first three albums he developed his playing on his favoured model of Hammond organ, the A-100 (similar in configuration and features to the B3 and C3 models, but slightly smaller in overall bulk), as featured on albums such as In the Land of Grey and Pink (1971).

Calyx, The Canterbury Website, compiled by the French music expert Aymeric Leroy, refers to him as "master of the typical Canterbury organ sound/playing". However, from the second album onwards, he also added other keyboards to his palette, including piano, harpsichord and Mellotron. On his return to Caravan for their fifth album, For Girls Who Grow Plump in the Night, he pioneered the Davolisint.

In between his stints with Caravan, he was a member of Matching Mole (1971–72), Hatfield and the North (1972–73), Polite Force (1976–77) and Camel (1978–1979).

In the early 2000s he released two solo albums, Full Circle and Into the Sun (both 2003). Since then, he has been engaged in a solo career, including concert appearances in Japan and England. A 30th anniversary re-release of his Moon Over Man album (originally issued on CD by Voiceprint in 1993) appeared in 2006. Like the earlier Voiceprint release, this consisted of demos for an unreleased solo album recorded 1976–77, featuring contributions from vocalists Tim Lynk and Gay Perez; however, the sound quality of the old analogue tapes was greatly improved and bonus tracks from the same sessions were added.

He moved to Kyoto, Japan in 2005. Since 2016, he lives in Yuge Island of Kamijima in the Seto Inland Sea.

Two solo albums, PianoWorks1 – Frozen in Time and Stream (the latter featuring several distinguished guest artists) were released in 2010 and 2011 respectively; licensing problems initially prevented Stream from being officially issued outside Japan until 2015.

The Little Things, intended as a follow-up to Stream, was released in 2013, the Japanese version being slightly different in packaging and content from the international version.

In May 2015 a series of well-received concert dates with saxophonist Jimmy Hastings took place in Japan.

Dave Sinclair's most recent solo album, Out of Sinc, was released in June 2018. In 2021, he released a compilation album Hook, Line & Sinclair, containing unreleased demos, alternate versions and new material.

In October 2022, Dave released an episodic documentary mini-series, Dave Sinclair ... The Lost Interview, talking about his music career with Caravan, Matching Mole, Hatfield and the North and Camel. Made for non-profit media, the first completed episodes are exclusively available via his YouTube channel.

52 years after the release of In the Land of Grey and Pink (1971), on 8 April 2023, Dave's son Nic Sinclair, launched a crowdfunding campaign via Indiegogo. The campaign revealed that the original Hammond A-100 organ that Dave used with Caravan, Matching Mole and Hatfield and the North, needed immediate rescue and with a restoration project to follow. As of 2026, the organ and equipment restoration is ongoing with ambition to revive the original Caravan sound for new projects and live performance.

In May 2023, Dave listed his solo catalog on Bandcamp

In February 2025, Dave released a new album via his Bandcamp store. Tears In His Eyes, is a digital-only album containing a collection of previously unreleased reworked versions of classic Caravan and solo tracks. Homemade Jams, followed in May 2025 with the output from restoration of forgotten reel to reel tapes in Dave's archive. Featuring lengthy recordings made in London and Whitstable through 1973-1974, the material comprises live sessions of jamming between Dave and his writing partner John Murphy, while accompanied by friends. From recent induction into Caravan, John G Perry is also featured playing bass in the first session.

== Discography ==
Solo

- 1993 – Moon Over Man (Voiceprint VP119CD)
- 2003 – Full Circle (DSincs-Music 001)
- 2003 – Into The Sun (DSincs-Music 002)
- 2006 – Moon Over Man [30th Anniversary Edition] (Eclectic Discs)
- 2009 – Treasure Chest (DSincs-Music)
- 2010 – Pianoworks I – Frozen in Time (CRSCNT 001)
- 2011 – Stream (CRSCNT 002)
- 2011 – Makino [Single] (DSincs-Music)
- 2012 – Blue Bread Song [Single] (DSincs-Music)
- 2013 – The Little Things (DSincs-Music)
- 2018 – Out Of Sinc (DSincs-Music)
- 2018 – Island Of Dreams [Single] (DSincs-Music)
- 2021 – Hook, Line & Sinclair (DSincs-Music)
- 2025 – Tears In His Eyes (DSincs-Music)
- 2025 – Homemade Jams (DSincs-Music)

Caravan

- 1969 – Caravan (Verve VLP 6011 now released on HTD Records as HTDCD 65)
- 1970 – If I Could Do It All Over Again I'd Do It All Over You (Decca SKL-R 5052)
- 1971 – In the Land of Grey and Pink (Deram SDL-R 1)
- 1973 – For Girls Who Grow Plump in the Night (Deram SKL-R 12)
- 1974 – Caravan and the New Symphonia (Decca SKL-R 1110)
- 1974 – This Is Caravan (Metronome 2001 – 200.164 / Brain – 200.164)
- 1975 – Cunning Stunts (Deram SKL-R 5210)
- 1980 – The Album (Kingdom KVL 9003)
- 1980 – The Best of Caravan Live (Kingdom 426002)
- 1982 – Back to Front (Kingdom KVL 5011)
- 1984 – The Collection (Kingdom KVL 6003)
- 1985 – And I Wish I Were Stoned / Don’t Worry (See For Miles 46)
- 1986 – The Canterbury Collection (Kingdom 9028)
- 1991 – BBC Radio 1 Live In Concert (Windsong International / Wind CD 003)
- 1991 – With An Ear To The Ground (Alex 2341)
- 1991 – Songs And Signs (Elite/ Pickwick/ Elite 002CDP)
- 1993 – Live (Demon Code90 NINETY 2)
- 1994 – Canterbury Tales (Decca / Deram 314 515 522-2)
- 1995 – The Battle of Hastings (HTD Records HTDCD 41)
- 1996 – All Over You (HTD Records HTDCD 57)
- 1997 – Live from the Astoria (HTD Records HTDCD 79)
- 1997 – The Best Of Caravan (See For Miles / 505)
- 1998 – Songs For Oblivion Fishermen (HUX / HUX 002)
- 1998 – Back On The Tracks (CoCaCamp ACT001)
- 1998 – Ether Way (HUX / HUX 013)
- 1998 – Show Of Our Lives (Mooncrest / Crest 036Z)
- 1999 – All Over You Too (HTD Records HTDCD 102)
- 1999 – Headloss (Delta / 47 007)
- 2000 – Where But For Caravan Would I: An Anthology (Decca / 524 755-2)
- 2001 – Travelling Ways (Sanctuary / Cmddd 276)
- 2002 – Live At The Fairfield Halls, 1974 (Universal International / 882902)
- 2002 – Green Bottles For Majorie (BBC)
- 1998 – Back on the Tracks (CoCaCamp act001)
- 1999 – All Over You Too (HTD Records HTDCD 102)
- 2003 – The Unauthorized Breakfast Item (on 2 tracks) (Eclectic Discs ECL 1001)
- 2003 – A Night’s Tale – Live In The USA (Classic Rock Legends)
- 2003 – With Strings Attached (Classic Rock Legends) *unauthorised
- 2003 – Nowhere To Hide (Classic Rock Legends) *unauthorised
- 2004 – Grey, Pink & Gold (Retro R2CD 42-73) *unauthorised
- 2006 – The Show Of Our Lives – Live at the BBC (Decca Deram 5301443)
- 2007 – Rare Broadcasts [Storming] *unauthorised
- 2008 – A Hunting We Shall Go – Live 1974 (The Store for Music) *unauthorised
- 2010 – The World Is Yours: The Anthology 1968-1976 [Boxset] (Decca)
- 2010 – Live On Air (Southworld) *unauthorised
- 2011 – In The Land Of Grey And Pink (40th Anniversary Deluxe Edition) (Decca)
- 2012 – All Over You And You Too (Talking Elephant)
- 2013 – In The Land Of Grey And Pink – Live (B13) *unauthorised
- 2014 – Place Of My Own: The Collection (Spectrum Audio)
- 2014 – A Nights Tale – Live At The Patriots Theater (The Store for Music) *unauthorised
- 2015 – All Access Pass (Demon)
- 2020 – The Decca/Deram Years (An Anthology) 1970-1975 [Boxset] (Universal 7722812)
- 2021 – Who Do You Think We Are? [Boxset] (Snapper Music)
- 2025 – The Shows Of Ours Live [Boxset] (Snapper Music)

Camel/Mirage

- 1978 – Breathless (Deram 820 726-2)
- 1978 – A Live Record [Decca / DBCR 7/8]
- 1995 – Live 14th December 1994 [Mirage Music]

Robert Wyatt

- 1970 – The End of an Ear (CBS 64189)

Matching Mole

- 1972 – Matching Mole (CBS 64850)
- 2002 – Matching Mole On The Radio (HUX HUX083)

Richard Sinclair's Caravan of Dreams

- 1992 – Richard Sinclair's Caravan of Dreams (HTD CD7)
- 1993 – An Evening of Magic (HTD CD 17)

Polite Force

- 1997 – Canterbury Knights (Voiceprint VP187)

== Filmography ==
- 1970: Amougies: European Music Revolution
- 2000: Where But For Caravan Would I?: An Affectionate Tribute (VHS)
- 2001: Classic Rock Legends (DVD)
- 2002: A Night's Tale - Live In The USA (DVD)
- 2004: The Ultimate Anthology (DVD) *unauthorised
- 2007: The Ultimate Collection (DVD) *unauthorised
- 2008: The Story Of Beat-Club Volume 2 1968-1970 (DVD)
- 2008: The Story Of Beat-Club Volume 3 1970-1972 (DVD)
- 2011: In The Land Of Grey And Pink (40th Anniversary Deluxe Edition) (DVD)
- 2014: Access All Areas (DVD)
- 2015: Romantic Warriors III: Canterbury Tales (DVD)
- 2016: Got Canterbury? (DVD)
- 2021: Who Do You Think We Are? (DVD)
- 2022: Dave Sinclair ... The Lost Interview
