= Pye Hastings =

British musician

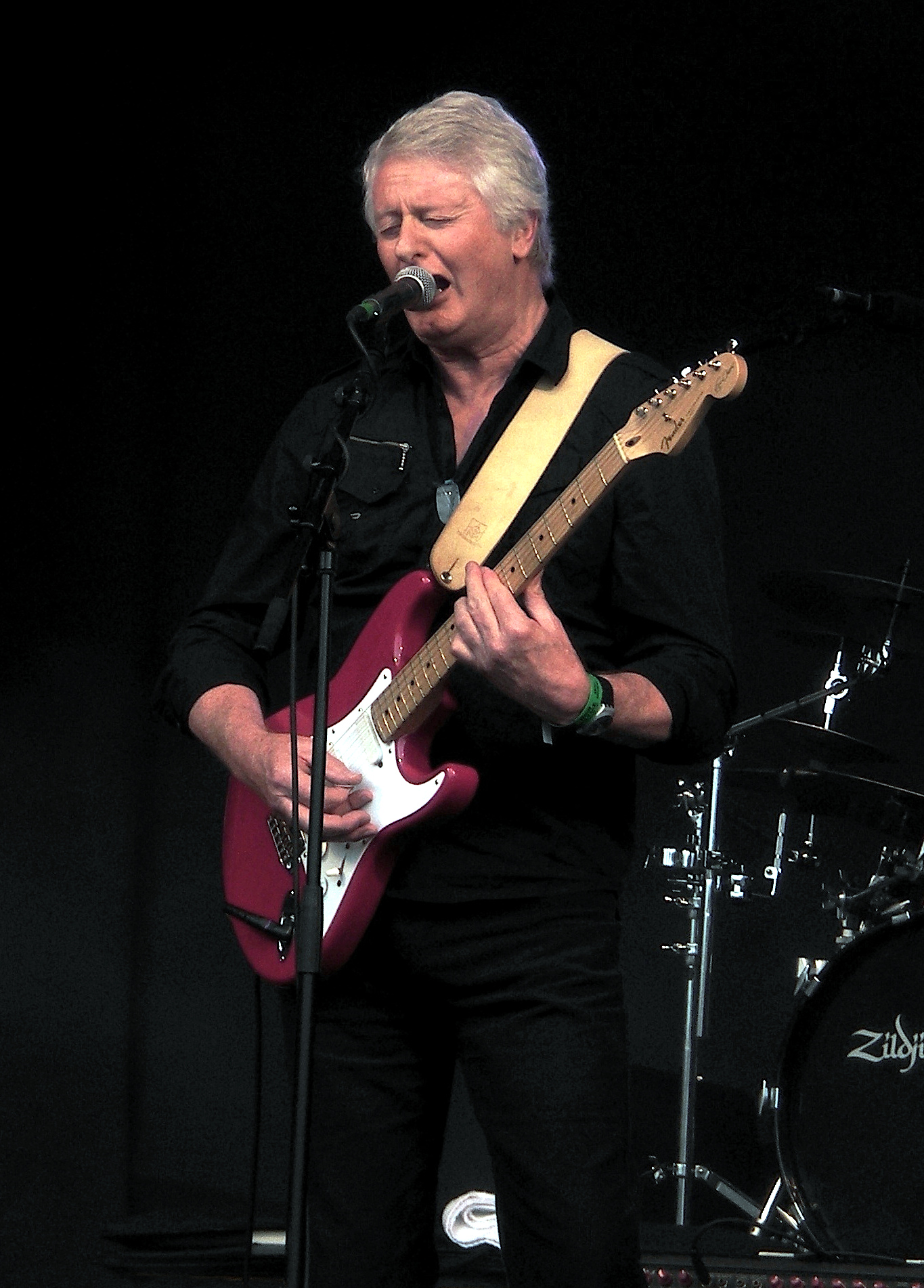
- Hastings performing in 2011
- Born: 21 January 1947 (age 79); Roadside, Tomnavoulin, Banffshire, Scotland
- Relatives: Jimmy Hastings (brother); John Aspinall (ex-brother in-law); Damian Aspinall (nephew)
- Musical career
- Origin: Canterbury, England
- Genres: Progressive rock; Canterbury scene; psychedelic rock
- Occupation: Singer-songwriter
- Instruments: Guitar; bass; percussion; vocals
- Years active: 1960s–present
- Member of: Caravan
- Formerly of: The Wilde Flowers

Julian Frederick Gordon 'Pye' Hastings (born 21 January 1947) is a British musician. He is the guitarist and vocalist for the rock band Caravan, and the only constant member of the band. Hastings was also a member of The Wilde Flowers, a band that included the other founding members of Caravan.

== Early life ==
Julian Frederick Gordon Hastings was born in Tomnavoulin, a village in Banffshire, Scotland, the youngest of five children. Prior to his birth, his family had lived in India, where his father was a bank manager. His father, who was from Aberdeen, was also a skilled piano player.

When Hastings was three months old, the family moved into a house in Tomintoul. When he was ten years old, his family moved from Scotland to England, to Lydden, a village in Kent. He attended Pilgrims Public School. After leaving school at sixteen, he spent a year travelling around Spain and Morocco. When he returned to England, he worked a series of temporary jobs, including as an insurance salesman.

Hastings is unsure on how he acquired the nickname Pye, but according to him: "some unknown reason my mum at some point decided to call me Pye. I have never been able to get a satisfactory answer as to why or even what it means but there you are. Later on in life she reverted to Julian."

Hastings started learning how to play guitar in the mid 1960s, after befriending his sisters boyfriend, Kevin Ayers. His first instrument was a Harmony Sovereign acoustic guitar, which his sister gifted him on his seventeenth birthday.

== Career ==
=== The Wilde Flowers ===
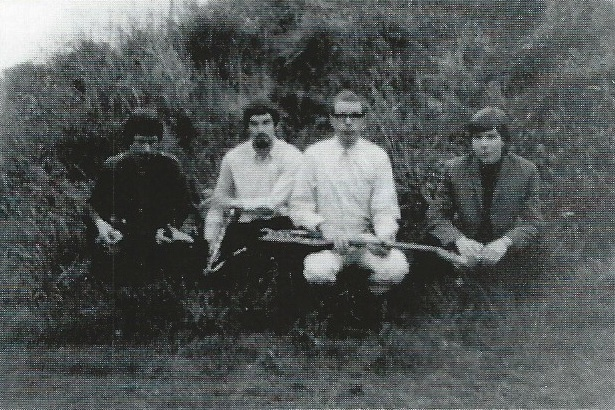
The Wilde Flowers in 1966, Hastings is sat furthest left

In around 1965, Hastings began to sit in at rehearsals for the band The Wilde Flowers, a band Ayers had previously been in, and was eventually asked to join them. Hastings made his first stage performance on 24 June 1966 at a Radio London rock music contest held at the Dreamland Ballroom in Margate. This would turn out to be the last gig for the bands drummer and lead vocalist, Robert Wyatt, who left and formed Soft Machine. After Wyatt's departure, Pye became the bands lead singer for the remainder of the groups history. The Wilde Flowers disbanded in October 1967.

The band are considered originators for the Canterbury scene, despite the fact they never released any material. Members of the Wilde Flowers would go on to find further success outside of the band, including Wyatt, Ayers, and brothers Brian and Hugh Hopper, who all went on to be core members of Soft Machine.

=== Caravan ===
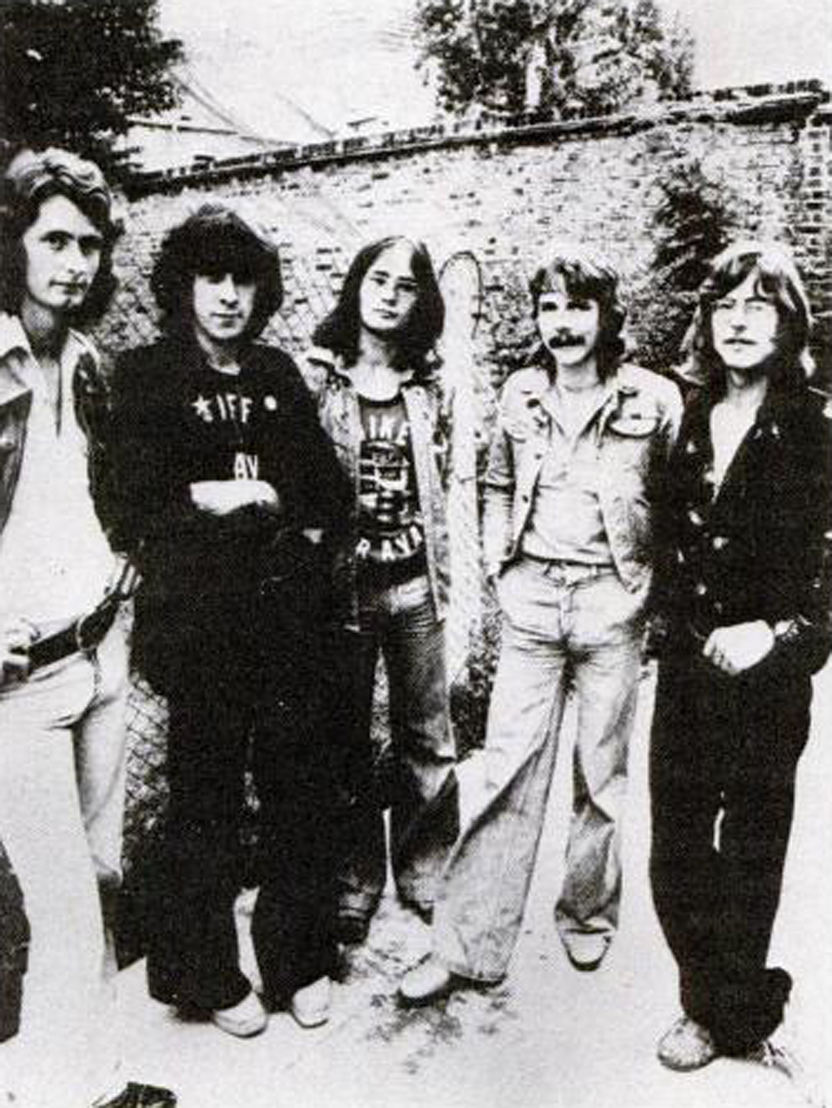
Caravan in 1974, Hastings stood furthest left

In January 1968, just a few months after Wilde Flowers ended, Hastings teamed up with Wilde Flowers members Dave Sinclair and Richard Coughlan (as well as Dave's cousin Richard who had left the band in 1965), and formed Caravan. Hastings' older brother, Jimmy, was also in the band as a flautist and saxophonist, but apart from a brief full-time tenure from 1996 to 1997, never as an official member, just as a studio contributor; he was still involved in the band at the time of his death in 2024.

Like The Wilde Flowers, Caravan are also considered a key part in the Canterbury scene, as well as the progressive rock scene. The band are best remembered for albums such as If I Could Do It All Over Again, I'd Do It All Over You (1970), In the Land of Grey and Pink (1971), and For Girls Who Grow Plump in the Night (1973). Hastings would play a range of instruments with the band, including guitar, bass guitar, and percussive instruments. He is the primary lead singer on the original recordings.

The band went on hiatus briefly in 1978, and were active on and off again throughout the 1980s and early 1990s, mostly containing the bands core lineup, until 1995, when a solo project involving Dave Sinclair and Coughlan led into the band reforming and releasing the material as a new Caravan album. Caravan has remained active since. Richard Sinclair has not been active in the band since 1992, Dave Sinclair left in 2002, and Coughlan died in 2013, leaving Hastings as the sole original member still in Caravan.

=== Solo ===
Caravan went on hiatus in 1978, which led to Hastings starting his solo career. He recorded several songs with members of Gordon Giltrap's band and his brother Jimmy, four of which were featured on CD in 1994. In the 1990s, he was involved in the prog rock band Mirage.

In 2017 he successfully funded through a PledgeMusic campaign his first solo album called From the Half House. Loudersound reviewed the album, describing it as: "this is more tiny teardrop trailer than silver-studded Airstream, but given the heartfelt sensitivity of Hastings’ performance, it matters not a jot."

== Songwriting ==
Hastings has seen himself more as a songwriter than as a guitarist, saying in an interview: "I'm more into a band playing together than performing as a soloist". Describing himself as a lyricist, he has admitted to being "quite lazy" and writing up lyrics to a song at the last minute, and on some occasions while the band are rehearsing in the studio.

== Personal life ==
Hastings lives in the North of Scotland. Hastings was the brother in-law to zoo and casino owner John Aspinall, who was the first wife to his sister Jane from 1956 to 1966. Hastings was good friends with Frank Zappa, who he first met at a music festival in Belgium in 1972. Zappa bought a fuzzbox for Pye.

== Filmography ==
- 2015: Romantic Warriors III: Canterbury Tales (DVD)
