= Richard Coughlan =

English musician (1947–2013)

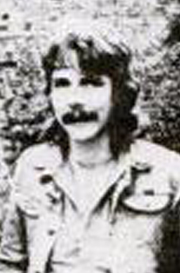

Background information
- Born: 2 September 1947; Herne Bay, Kent, England
- Died: 1 December 2013 (aged 66)
- Genres: Progressive rock, jazz fusion, Canterbury scene, art rock
- Occupation: Musician
- Instrument: Drummer
- Years active: 1966–2013
- Formerly of: The Wilde Flowers, Caravan

Richard Coughlan (2 September 1947 – 1 December 2013) was an English musician who was best known as the drummer and percussionist of the Canterbury scene progressive rock band Caravan. He was one of the founding members of the band in 1968 and remained with them until his death. AllMusic called Coughlan "one of art rock's longest tenured musicians".

== Early life ==
Richard Coughlan was born on 2 September 1947 in Herne Bay, Kent, England. He attended the Frank Hooker School in Canterbury, where he started playing mouth organ at the age of ten. Later Coughlan joined the Sea Cadets where he first played bugle and then marching drums, moving up the ranks to the position of lead drummer. When he was 16, he acquired his own drum kit and joined a local dance band, although he said they "didn't really do anything but rehearse!"

== Career ==
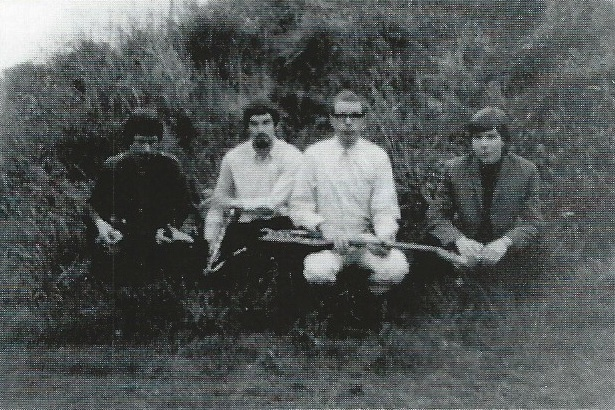
Coughlan (first on right) with the Wilde Flowers (1966)

In 1966, through a friend from the Sea Cadets, Coughlan met up with Hugh Hopper, the bass guitarist of the Canterbury psychedelic rock band the Wilde Flowers. Coughlan began attending their rehearsals and paid particular attention to Robert Wyatt, the band's drummer. In April 1966, when Wyatt became the lead vocalist, Coughlan joined the group on drums. Later Wyatt left to form Soft Machine, but Coughlan remained with the Wilde Flowers for another year. When Soft Machine acquired their first record deal, the Wilde Flowers decided they needed one too, and reconstituted themselves as Caravan. Coughlan had trained to be a dental technician, but with the formation of Caravan, he chose to be a professional musician instead.

Caravan's brand of art rock emphasised Coughlan's drumming, which enabled him to contribute to some of the band's compositions, including the 19/8 time signature on the "A Hunting We Shall Go/L'Auberge du Sanglier" song suite for For Girls Who Grow Plump in the Night. The group was active from 1968 to the early 1980s, during which time they recorded ten albums and toured Europe and North America. After punk rock came to the fore, they decided to call it quits, and Coughlan started a second career in the pub business.

In 1990 Caravan reunited again and played at the Canterbury Festival in June, followed by a one-off televised concert for ITV Central's new music series "Bedrock" at the Central TV studios in Nottingham. The success of their performances and the sales of a subsequent live album prompted the band to reform, although this time on a part-time basis. Over the next decade, with Coughlan still at the helm, Caravan periodically assembled to record an album or perform at a festival. In between commitments with the band, Coughlan continued his work in the pub business and later went on to run The Sun Inn in Faversham In 2005 Coughlan was diagnosed with "a form of rheumatoid arthritis" and this put a halt to Caravan's live performances.

Caravan returned to live performances in 2010 with Mark Walker joining the band. Despite Walker's inclusion, Coughlan remained with Caravan until his death in December 2013.

== Death ==
Coughlan died of pneumonia on 1 December 2013 at the Queen Victoria Memorial Hospital in Herne Bay. He was survived by his wife, Sue, and a daughter. Pye Hastings said: "Richard was a fine musician and will forever be remembered, not least by us, but by the fans all around the world."
