= Live... in the Shadow of the Blues =

Live: In the Shadow of the Blues

Live album by Whitesnake
- Released: 24 November 2006
- Recorded: 2006
- Genre: Hard rock
- Length: 131:27
- Label: SPV/Steamhammer; WEA (Japan)
- Producer: David Coverdale, Doug Aldrich, Michael McIntyre

Whitesnake chronology
Live... In the Still of the Night (2006)	Live: In the Shadow of the Blues (2006)	Good to Be Bad (2008)

Singles from Live in the Shadow of the Blues
- 1. "All I Want Is You" Released: 2006

Professional ratings
Review scores
Source	Rating
AllMusic	3/5 stars
Metal Hammer (Germany)	6/7

Live: In the Shadow of the Blues is the third live album by the British-American rock band Whitesnake. Included are four new studio tracks. The album was recorded on a world tour which began on 9 May 2006 in Zepp Fukuoka, Fukuoka, Japan. The Japanese concerts were followed by concerts in Europe and UK. The tour went to twenty two countries and ended on 9 August 2006 in NIA, Birmingham, UK. The album was released in Europe on 24 November 2006 and was released in Japan on WEA. The album features most of Whitesnake's biggest hits. The live album was included in the group's boxset Access All Areas: Live, released on 25 April 2025.

== Track listing ==
Disc one
No.	Title	Writer(s)	Original album	Length
1.	"Bad Boys"	David Coverdale, John Sykes	Whitesnake (1987)	6:22
2.	"Slide It In"	Coverdale	Slide It In (1984)	5:11
3.	"Slow an' Easy"	Coverdale, Micky Moody	Slide It In (1984)	6:54
4.	"Love Ain't No Stranger"	Coverdale, Mel Galley	Slide It In (1984)	4:31
5.	"Judgement Day"	Coverdale, Adrian Vandenberg	Slip of the Tongue (1989)	5:34
6.	"Is This Love"	Coverdale, Sykes	Whitesnake (1987)	4:58
7.	"Blues for Mylene"	Doug Aldrich		3:31
8.	"Snake Dance"	Coverdale, Aldrich		2:03
9.	"Crying in the Rain"	Coverdale	Saints & Sinners (1982)	5:46
10.	"Ain't No Love in the Heart of the City"	Michael Price, Dan Walsh	Snakebite EP (1978)	8:44
11.	"Fool for Your Loving"	Coverdale, Moody, Bernie Marsden	Ready an' Willing (1980)	4:51
12.	"Here I Go Again"	Coverdale, Marsden	Saints & Sinners (1982)	5:53
13.	"Still of the Night"	Coverdale, Sykes	Whitesnake (1987)	8:38

Disc two
No.	Title	Writer(s)	Original album	Length
1.	"Burn - Stormbringer"	Coverdale, Ritchie Blackmore, Jon Lord, Ian Paice	cover	8:38
2.	"Give Me All Your Love"	Coverdale, Sykes	Whitesnake (1987)	4:27
3.	"Walking in the Shadow of the Blues"	Coverdale, Marsden	Lovehunter (1979)	5:10
4.	"The Deeper the Love"	Coverdale, Vandenberg	Slip of the Tongue (1989)	4:31
5.	"Ready an' Willing"	Coverdale, Moody, Neil Murray, Lord, Paice	Ready an' Willing (1980)	5:41
6.	"Don't Break My Heart Again"	Coverdale	Come an' Get It (1981)	6:08
7.	"Take Me with You"	Coverdale, Moody	Trouble (1978)	7:50
8.	"Ready to Rock"	Coverdale, Aldrich	studio	4:19
9.	"If You Want Me"	Coverdale, Aldrich	studio	4:08
10.	"All I Want Is You"	Coverdale, Aldrich	studio	4:12
11.	"Dog"	Coverdale, Aldrich	studio	3:27
12.	"Crying in the Rain (extended version with Tommy Aldridge drum solo)" (Bonus track on Special Limited Edition only)	Coverdale	Saints & Sinners (1982)	12:25

== Personnel ==
- David Coverdale - lead vocals
- Doug Aldrich - guitar, backing vocals
- Reb Beach - guitar, backing vocals
- Timothy Drury - keyboards, backing vocals
- Uriah Duffy - bass, backing vocals
- Tommy Aldridge - drums

== Charts ==
Chart (2006)	Peak position
Austrian Albums (Ö3 Austria)	64
French Albums (SNEP)	177
German Albums (Offizielle Top 100)	82
Japanese Albums (Oricon)	64
UK Albums (OCC)	141
UK Rock & Metal Albums (OCC)	13
