= Live... in the Still of the Night =

2006 live album by Whitesnake

Live... In the Still of the Night

Video by Whitesnake
- Released: 7 February 2006 (limited); 9 May 2006 (regular)
- Recorded: 20 October 2004 at the Hammersmith Apollo, London, UK
- Genre: Hard rock
- Length: 129 min.
- Label: Coming Home Studios/Done and Dusted, Hip-O (US), AFM (Europe)
- Director: Hamish Hamilton, Hayley Collet, Jim Parsons
- Producer: Jack Gulick, Simon Pizey, Daniel E. Catullo III, David Coverdale, Tilton Gardner, Rober McClaugherty, Shelly Singhal, Jim Parsons

Whitesnake video albums chronology
Starkers in Tokyo (1998)	Live... In the Still of the Night (2006)	Live: In the Shadow of the Blues (2006)

Live... In the Still of the Night

Live album by Whitesnake
- Released: 7 February 2006
- Recorded: 20 October 2004 at the Hammersmith Apollo, London, UK
- Genre: Hard rock, heavy metal
- Length: 59 min.
- Label: Hip-O (US); AFM (Europe)
- Producer: David Coverdale

Whitesnake chronology
The Definitive Collection (2006)	Live... In the Still of the Night (2006)	Live: In the Shadow of the Blues (2006)

Live... In the Still of the Night is a live concert DVD by the British-American rock band Whitesnake. The concert was filmed on 20 October 2004 at the Hammersmith Apollo in London. It was released regularly on 5 May 2006 featuring the recording of the live performance, behind-the-scene documentary and a photobook. The limited "special collector's" edition which was previously released on 7 February 2006 includes a bonus live album CD with ten selected songs from the same show.

The CD is expected to be re-released in the group's new live boxset Access All Areas: Live in a new LP format on 25 April 2025.

== Reception ==
Professional ratings
Review scores
Source	Rating
AllMusic	4.5/5 stars
Metal.de	9/10

The DVD received positive reviews. Bret Adams of AllMusic rated the DVD a 4.5 out of 5, stating that "the band glides along as a tight ensemble more than you think."

At the 2006 Classic Rock Roll of Honour Awards ceremony, the DVD won the award for "DVD of the Year."

== Track listing ==
1. "Burn" (David Coverdale, Ritchie Blackmore, Jon Lord, Ian Paice)
2. "Bad Boys" (Coverdale, John Sykes)
3. "Love Ain't No Stranger" (Coverdale, Mel Galley)
4. "Ready an' Willing" (Coverdale, Micky Moody, Neil Murray, Lord, Paice)
5. "Is This Love" (Coverdale, Sykes)
6. "Give Me All Your Love" (Coverdale, Sykes)
7. "Judgement Day" (Coverdale, Adrian Vandenberg)
8. "Blues for Mylene" (Doug Aldrich)
9. "Snake Dance" (Coverdale, Aldrich)
10. "Crying in the Rain" (Coverdale)
11. "Drum Solo" (Tommy Aldridge)
12. "Crying in the Rain" (Coverdale)
13. "Ain't No Love in the Heart of the City" (Michael Price, Dan Walsh)
14. "Don't Break My Heart Again" (Coverdale)
15. "Fool for Your Loving" (Coverdale, Moody, Bernie Marsden)
16. "Here I Go Again" (Coverdale, Marsden)
17. "Take Me with You" (Coverdale, Moody)
18. "Still of the Night" (Coverdale, Sykes)
19. "Credits"

"Plus special Bonus backstage footage and interview with the band."

Limited Edition Bonus CD
No.	Title	Writer(s)	Length
1.	"Burn" (Includes an excerpt of Stormbringer by Deep Purple)	Coverdale, Blackmore, Lord, Paice	8:39
2.	"Give Me All Your Love Tonight"	Coverdale, Sykes	4:54
3.	"Is This Love"	Coverdale, Sykes	4:47
4.	"Love Ain't No Stranger"	Coverdale, Galley	4:35
5.	"Judgment Day"	Coverdale, Vandenberg	5:27
6.	"Ain't No Love in the Heart of the City"	Price, Walsh	9:18
7.	"Fool for Your Loving"	Coverdale, Moody, Marsden	4:51
8.	"Here I Go Again"	Coverdale, Marsden	5:34
9.	"Take Me with You"	Coverdale, Moody	7:17
10.	"Still of the Night"	Coverdale, Sykes	8:52

== Personnel ==
- David Coverdale - lead vocals
- Doug Aldrich - guitar, backing vocals
- Reb Beach - guitar, backing vocals
- Timothy Drury - keyboards, backing vocals
- Marco Mendoza - bass, backing vocals
- Tommy Aldridge - drums

== Charts ==
Chart (2006)	Peak position
UK Music Video Chart	2
German Albums Chart	23
Japanese Oricon Albums&DVD Chart	16

== Certifications ==
Region	Certification	Certified units/sales
Germany (BVMI)	Gold	25,000^{^}
United Kingdom (BPI)	Gold	25,000^{^}
^{^} Shipments figures based on certification alone.
