= Whitesnake (album) =

Studio album by Whitesnake
- Released: 16 March 1987
- Recorded: September 1985 – November 1986
- Studios: Little Mountain (Vancouver); Phase One (Toronto) Compass Point (Nassau); Cherokee (Hollywood); One on One (North Hollywood); Goodnight L.A. (Los Angeles)
- Genres: Glam metal; heavy metal; hard rock
- Length: 42:25 (US version); 53:10 (European version)
- Labels: Geffen; EMI
- Producers: Mike Stone; Keith Olsen

Whitesnake chronology
Slide It In (1984)	Whitesnake (1987)	Slip of the Tongue (1989)

Singles from Whitesnake
- 1. "Still of the Night" Released: 2 March 1987; 2. "Is This Love" Released: 18 May 1987; 3. "Here I Go Again '87" Released: 19 October 1987; 4. "Give Me All Your Love ('88 Mix)" Released: 4 January 1988

John Sykes chronology
Slide It In (1984)	1987 (1987)	Blue Murder (1989)

Whitesnake, commonly known as 1987, is the seventh studio album by British rock band Whitesnake. The album was released by Geffen Records in the US on 16 March 1987 and by EMI Records in the UK two weeks later.

1987 was a critical and commercial success around the world, eventually selling over 8 million copies in the US alone and thus being certified 8× Platinum by the Recording Industry Association of America (RIAA). It has sold more than 25 million copies worldwide. The album peaked at number two on the US Billboard 200 for ten non-consecutive weeks and was barred from the top spot by U2's Joshua Tree. The album spent more weeks in the Top 5 than any other album in 1987. Whitesnake is the band's highest-charting album in the US and peaked at number eight on the UK Albums Chart.

"Still of the Night", "Here I Go Again '87", "Is This Love", and "Give Me All Your Love ('88 Mix)" were released as official singles from 1987, and "Crying in the Rain '87" was released as a promotional single from the album. "Here I Go Again" and "Is This Love" are the band's most successful charting hits, topping the Billboard Hot 100 at number one and number two, respectively.

Aside from its commercial success, 1987 is notable for the band's shift to a glam metal look and sound. At the 1988 Brit Awards, Whitesnake was nominated for Best British Group. At the American Music Awards of 1988, it received a nomination for Favorite Pop/Rock Album for 1987.

== Background ==
The supporting tour for Slide It In came to an end in January 1985, when Whitesnake played two shows at the Rock in Rio festival in Brazil. After the band's performance at the last show, drummer Cozy Powell left the group. After almost ten years since David Coverdale had started his solo career and formed Whitesnake, he was actually about to fold the band. However, executives at Geffen Records asked Coverdale to continue working with guitarist John Sykes, as they saw potential in the two. Whitesnake had previously signed with Geffen for distribution in the US and Canada only, while in Europe they remained with EMI, except in France, where Carrere Records released the album.

== Songwriting and production ==
Coverdale wanted the band's sound "to be leaner, meaner and more electrifying ... felt it was time for a change. I didn't want to stay in the same old traditional blues and pop scenario". It was kind of "Americanization", but rather than following popular trends, "it was a series of synchronised elements that came together". However, Coverdale recalls that "the only downside was it was the only time I'd embraced a fashion presentation, as opposed to being stylized in what I do. I think that disappointed a lot of my hardcore people".

In the spring of 1985, Coverdale and Sykes decamped to the town of Le Rayol in the south of France to start writing material for a new album. According to Coverdale, bassist Neil Murray also helped with some of the arrangements. Two songs that would emerge from these sessions would be two of Whitesnake's biggest hits: "Still of the Night", based on an old demo by Coverdale and Deep Purple guitarist Ritchie Blackmore, and "Is This Love", originally written for Tina Turner. The middle atmospherics with cello riff of "Still of the Night" was Coverdale's idea after experimenting with introduction atmospheric sounds from a synthesizer on "Looking for Love". According to Coverdale, there was a great potential and creativity between him and Sykes, however, "personality-wise, it was a crash collision". As per Murray, Coverdale admired Sykes' cockiness, arrogance and self-confidence, which helped with the writing and initial creative spark between them in France. However, as the album progressed, Sykes' ambitiousness and artistic vision grew to the point he was imposing himself as a co-leader in the band alongside Coverdale, undermining the latter's sole leadership of the band.

Coverdale, Sykes and Murray then moved to Los Angeles, where they rehearsed and started auditioning for drummers, and hired Aynsley Dunbar. With their line-up complete, Whitesnake headed up to Little Mountain Sound Studios in Vancouver, Canada, in late September 1985 to lay down basic tracks for the new record with Mike Stone producing. One of the first issues the band faced was Sykes' desire to achieve a specific guitar sound that he wanted, which he eventually found with the help of Coverdale's friend and engineer Bob Rock, who had previously worked with Bon Jovi on the multi-platinum album Slippery When Wet. Additionally, sessions were delayed by illnesses within the band, including Sykes being hospitalised for strep throat. Sykes also briefly returned to England in January 1986 to attend Thin Lizzy bandmate Phil Lynott's funeral.

The next problem the band faced was a serious sinus infection with which Coverdale was stricken in spring of 1986. This put the album's production behind schedule, especially when Coverdale underwent surgery and half a year-long rehabilitation program without a guarantee the voice would come back. Additionally, the album had run over budget in April 1986, so the wages stopped for the other members of the band; Sykes stayed around to work on his guitar parts, while Murray and Dunbar were not required and were encouraged to find other work.

While recovering, various invoices started circulating from Toronto and London, with Coverdale saying that "received no support from Sykes at that time" and "he did everything he could to take advantage of me being compromised". Allegedly Sykes grew impatient, claiming that the singer "used every excuse possible to explain why he didn't want to record his vocals", and reportedly suggested bringing in a new vocalist and carrying on without Coverdale, which eventually led to the end of Coverdale's working relationship with both Sykes and producer Stone. Sykes denied this in 2017, stating: "Now I want to correct a rumour that I know has been out there for a long time. It's been said that when David was having his troubles, I went to Geffen and urged them to bring in another singer to replace him in Whitesnake. That's rubbish. How on earth could you ever have anyone fronting Whitesnake apart from David Coverdale?". Additionally, Sykes maintained that he remained loyal to Coverdale and finishing his work on the album when the wages had stopped, even turning down other gigs in the process. Producer Stone was instead said to be the one suggesting a replacement singer, which ended Coverdale's partnership with him, although Sykes was still intent on completing his guitar parts with Stone.

After Coverdale recovered, he started to work on his vocal tracks with record producer Ron Nevison, before soon switching to Keith Olsen in August 1986 because "it didn't sound good at all ... he [Ron] did great with other people, just not with me". Olsen asked him to sing "Still of the Night" in the first studio session, but although he almost vomited, "sang the song twice, fingers crossed – and that's what's on the record". After Sykes completed vocals in LA, Sykes and Murray finished their instrumental parts in London with producer Stone during October and November 1986. The tapes were returned to Los Angeles, where final overdubs and mixing was completed in December by Olsen. Vandenberg was brought in at this point to record the guitar solo for the re-recorded version of "Here I Go Again" because Sykes disliked the song; Coverdale was also discussing the possibility of Vandenberg officially joining Whitesnake. Coincidentally, as Vandenberg recalled overhearing mid-session, Sykes came to confront Coverdale in the studio after being sidelined during the London sessions, resulting in the latter storming off.

With the recording process done and the album slated to be released in early 1987, Coverdale made the decision to let the other members of the band go, due to personal differences. According to Coverdale, he was facing trust issues with band members, his depression upon arrival to L.A. from a holiday in Munich, where he had seen his daughter from his first marriage, and a massive debt, due to not having worked for two to three years. From Sykes' perspective, he had reasoned that Coverdale wanted to take more control and start from a clean slate after all that happened.

The album was the first to be recorded digitally by the band, primarily with the use of synthesizers that can be heard prominently with the album's sound approach. In US pressings, the album was claimed to be recorded on analogue. Coverdale had expressed his advocacy for the perceived "warmth" of analogue recording in many interviews, while working on his solo album Into the Light in 2000.

== Artwork ==
On the band's new logo and cover artwork, Coverdale worked with Canadian graphic artist Hugh Syme. Based on Coverdale's idea, Syme created a Celtic runic-style amulet with various elements representing the Sun, Moon, fertility and others.

== Release and promotion ==
For the new line-up of the band, Coverdale recruited lead guitarist Adrian Vandenberg (with whom he had already discussed plans), rhythm guitarist Vivian Campbell, bassist Rudy Sarzo and drummer Tommy Aldridge. This line-up, dubbed "The Vid[eo] Kids" by Coverdale, toured in support of the album, and all appeared in music videos for "Still of the Night" (which was the most requested video on MTV when it was released), "Is This Love", "Here I Go Again" and "Give Me All Your Love", the first three of which prominently featured Coverdale's then new partner Tawny Kitaen, all with heavy MTV and radio airplay.

The album was titled as Whitesnake in the US and Canada, released on 16 March 1987 by Geffen (Many sources, including Coverdale, claimed the release date was on 23 March and 7 April). In Europe, the album was simply called 1987, featuring a different running order and two extra tracks: "Looking for Love" and "You're Gonna Break My Heart Again", released on 30 March through EMI. Coverdale considers "Looking for Love" one of the best songs he wrote with Sykes, but it was not included in the North American version because of Kalodner's preference for "Children of the Night" and time constraints of vinyl records limited to about 20 minutes a side. These two songs were for the first time released in North America in 1994 on Whitesnake's Greatest Hits compilation. In Japan, the album was titled Serpens Albus in reference to the illustrated text on the album's artwork, which means "white snake" in Latin, but with the North American tracklist, released on 22 April by CBS/Sony. In Australia, the album was released as 1987 but had the North American track order on the original vinyl, and the European order on CD. In Bulgaria, the album was released on LP and cassette as 1987 and used a slightly modified version of the European track order, without "You're Gonna Break My Heart Again", while "Here I Go Again '87" was replaced with the radio mix version

=== Commercial performance ===
1987 debuted at number 72 on the Billboard 200 chart on 18 April, reaching at the Top 10 on 9 May, and Top 5 on 30 May. "The album's exploding everywhere—it's unbelievable what's going on," Geffen Records senior executive Al Coury said, citing "Still of the Night" getting an "overwhelming response" over the success on airplay, contributing to the album's huge jump in the Billboard charts. Having peaked at number 2, the album hovered at or near its peak position over the course of seven months from 13 June 1987 to 23 January 1988, spending in total more weeks inside the top five than any other album in 1987 and charting for 76 weeks in total. It was barred from the top spot, for 10 non-consecutive weeks by three different albums, including U2's The Joshua Tree, Whitney Houston's Whitney, and mostly Michael Jackson's Bad. It however peaked number one in the Cash Box albums chart for three consecutive weeks, becoming the group's only album to peak at that position. According to Coverdale, the album was selling at a record-high for Warner Bros. "...between 10 AM and noon, which was like 390,000" copies. The radio pushed it further to 800,000 copies, but the major factor was its exposure on MTV. It sold four million copies in all and as such was certified four-times Platinum by Recording Industry Association of America (RIAA) on 2 December 1987, and five-times Platinum on 7 January 1988. By October 1989, the album had sold nine million copies worldwide and six million copies alone in the United States (before being certified for six million on 24 July 1992). The last RIAA certification was eight-times Platinum on 10 February 1995, for sales of over 8,000,000. Since its release, 1987 has sold 10 million in the US alone. Reported total sales worldwide between 1990 and 2017 were more than 10-15 million. By 2025, the album has sold 25 million copies worldwide.

"Still of the Night"
A 40-second sample of "Still of the Night", the first single from the album and one of band's most popular songs.

Whitesnake's initial breakthrough was via album's lead single "Still of the Night" which video got a "tremendous amount of airplay" on MTV. The song only peaked at number 79 on the Billboard Hot 100 singles chart and number 18 on the Billboard Albums Rock Tracks chart, while it reached number 16 in the UK Singles chart. The album also spawned two Billboard Hot 100 hit singles: "Here I Go Again '87" which reached number 1 on 10 October, and "Is This Love" which reached number 2 on 19 December. Both "Here I Go Again" and "Crying in the Rain" had previously been recorded with a different line-up and released on the 1982 album Saints & Sinners. The re-recording of "Here I Go Again" was advised by record label boss David Geffen and requested by A&R John Kalodner as a negotiation deal with Coverdale to re-record "Crying in the Rain" for the album.

According to Chicago Tribune, in the year-end results of Billboard's combined album and singles weekly charts, Whitesnake was among the Top 5 artists of the year with Bon Jovi, U2, Whitney Houston and Madonna, describing them as a "dark horse snuck into the Top 5 by quietly scoring big points with its Whitesnake LP, which spent much of the year in the Top 5 but never quite made it to No. 1. The band also scored big with 'Here I Go Again', a sleeper that had just one week at No. 1 but wound up as one of the year's Top 10 singles". According to Billboard, the band was also 8th among Top 100 Pop Album Artists, 22nd among Top 100 Pop Singles Artists, 6th among Top 25 Pop Album Artists Duos/Groups and 15h among Top 25 Pop Singles Artists Duos/Groups, the album was 16th among Top 100 Pop Albums and 11th among Top 25 Pop Comact Disks, while single "Here I Go Again" was 7th among Top 100 Pop Singles and 19th among Top 25 Rock Tracks. Later, Coverdale recalled that he did not expect such success and that although he was ready for it professionally, he was not privately as he was constantly chased by the paparazzi, which forced him to move from Los Angeles to Lake Tahoe.

=== Reissue ===
For the 20th anniversary in May and June 2007, EMI released a remastered reissue of the original European version of the album, featuring two European songs previously unreleased in the North American version, live tracks, and a DVD with video clips and live performances.

For the 30th anniversary, on 6 October 2017, were released by Rhino Entertainment and Parlophone, the catalog division of Warner Music Group, a super deluxe edition (4CD/DVD box set containing the original album full tracklist in a newly remastered format along with a live recording from their 1987–1988 tour, demos and rehearsals, remixes and the DVD of music videos and tour bootlegs, as well as a book and a booklet with lyrics), a 1CD edition, a 2CD edition (second CD "Snakeskin Boots" includes live recordings from 1987 to 1988 tour), and 2LP edition (second LP including some remixes and live recordings). The vinyl LP charted on the UK Official Vinyl Albums Chart at the 22nd position.

On 25 June 2026, Craft Recordings announced its vinyl counterpart reissue along with Slide It In and Slip of the Tongue, which is set to be released on 18 September.

== Touring ==
The band, featuring the new lineup, went on an extensive tour which began with a concert in-front of over 80,000 people at the sold-out Texxas Jam festival on 20 June 1987 and finished at Memorial Coliseum in Portland, Oregon, on 15 August 1988. The tour travelled through the United States, Canada, the United Kingdom, and Japan. During first part of the tour, they were an opening act for Mötley Crüe on their Girls, Girls, Girls Tour with good box-office success.

The only live audio and video recording from the 1987–1988 tour, can be found on the 30th anniversary edition of the album (2017) as audio on a twelve-track second CD "Snakeskin Boots (Live on Tour 1987–88)", while video was featured on DVD as a fourth part named "1987 Tour Video Bootleg" and featured live video performances of "Crying in the Rain" and "Still of the Night".

== Reception ==
Professional ratings
Review scores
Source	Rating
AllMusic	4.5/5 stars
Christgau's Record Guide	D+
Classic Rock	5/5 stars
Collector's Guide to Heavy Metal	8/10
Los Angeles Times	4/4 stars
MusicHound Rock	5/5 stars
Record Collector	5/5 stars
Rock Hard	9/10

The album was generally met with positive reviews. According to music journalist Mick Wall, the album "wasn't just the best Whitesnake album, it was one of the best rock albums of its era", while "Here I Go Again" became a "signature tune for Coverdale and Whitesnake. It's pretty, with beautifully soulful lead vocal for sure, but it's the 'My Way'-type ingredient of the lyrics ... that does it to ya every time". J. D. Considine writing favorably for Rolling Stone argued that although the album is perhaps lacking in originality having "every worthwhile mannerism and lick in the heavy-rock vocabulary" and a mixture of styles reminiscent of Led Zeppelin, Scorpions and Foreigner, "what makes it such a guilty pleasure, though, is that Coverdale isn't simply stealing licks; he and guitarist John Sykes understand the structure, pacing and drama of the old Led Zeppelin sound and deserve credit for concocting such a convincing simulacrum". Steve Huey and Bradley Torreano writing for AllMusic gave both North American and European versions the same rating of 4.5 stars out of 5, being "a collection of loud, polished hard rockers, plus the band's best set of pop hooks", however felt the European version is superior due to better tracklist flow and two more songs, especially "Looking for Love", which "a nice slow build to a blustery chorus makes this a classic David Coverdale ballad". The 20th, and 30th anniversary, reissues were also favorably received. The exception to these reviews was Robert Christgau, who in his negative review deemed that "the attraction of this veteran pop-metal has got to be total predictability. The glistening solos, the surging crescendos, the familiar macho love rhymes, the tunes you can hum before the verse is over--not one heard before, yet every one somehow known".

In 2006 Classic Rock considered it as 96th among "100 Greatest British Rock Albums Ever". In 2010, Martin Popoff listed it as 116th in The Top 500 Heavy Metal Albums of All Time. Billboard has named the 2017 reissue at number seven for the best reissues of that respective year. In 2019, magazine Rolling Stone ranked the album 12th among "50 Greatest Hair Metal Albums of All Time". In 2020, Metal Hammer included it among Top 20 best metal albums of 1987, among other lists. Its success in the US boosted its predecessor, Slide It In (1984), from Gold to double Platinum status by RIAA. It would see the band receive a nomination at the 1988 Brit Awards for Best British Group, as well as a nomination at the American Music Awards of 1988 for Favorite Pop/Rock Album.

In 2006, the 1987 version of "Here I Go Again" was ranked number 17 on VH1's 100 Greatest Songs of the '80s. In 2008 The Times included it in the Top 11 "heavy metal at its best" list. In 2012 Reader's Poll of Rolling Stone it ranked as 9th among Top 10 "The Best Hair Metal Songs of All Time", while in 2017, The Daily Telegraph included it among 21 best power ballads. In 2015, Classic Rock ranked "Is This Love" as 7th on their list of Top 40 greatest power ballads. In 2009, the song "Still of the Night" was named as the 27th best hard rock song of all time by VH1.

=== Accolades ===
Publication	Country	Accolade	Rank
Classic Rock	UK	100 Greatest British Rock Albums Ever	96
Martin Popoff	Canada	The Top 500 Heavy Metal Albums of All Time	116
Rolling Stone	US	50 Greatest Hair Metal Albums of All Time	12
Guitar World	US	Top 20 Hair Metal Albums of the Eighties	No order
Ultimate Classic Rock	US	Top 30 Glam Metal Albums	9
Loudwire	US	Top 30 Hair Metal Albums	12
Metal Rules	US	Top 50 Glam Metal Albums	17
Loudwire	US	Top 80 Hard Rock + Metal Albums of the 1980s	44
Loudwire	US	10 Best Hair Metal Albums by Non-Hair Metal Bands	No order

== Track listings ==
All tracks are written by David Coverdale and John Sykes, except where noted.

North American version
No.	Title	Length
1.	"Crying in the Rain '87" (Coverdale)	5:37
2.	"Bad Boys"	4:09
3.	"Still of the Night"	6:38
4.	"Here I Go Again '87" (Coverdale, Bernie Marsden)	4:33
5.	"Give Me All Your Love"	3:30
6.	"Is This Love"	4:43
7.	"Children of the Night"	4:24
8.	"Straight for the Heart"	3:40
9.	"Don't Turn Away"	5:11

European version (1987)
No.	Title	Length
1.	"Still of the Night"	6:38
2.	"Bad Boys"	4:09
3.	"Give Me All Your Love"	3:30
4.	"Looking for Love"	6:33
5.	"Crying in the Rain" (Coverdale)	5:37
6.	"Is This Love"	4:43
7.	"Straight for the Heart"	3:40
8.	"Don't Turn Away"	5:11
9.	"Children of the Night"	4:24
10.	"Here I Go Again 87" (Coverdale, Marsden)	4:33
11.	"You're Gonna Break My Heart Again"	4:11

Bulgarian version
No.	Title	Length
1.	"Still of the Night"	6:38
2.	"Bad Boys"	4:09
3.	"Give Me All Your Love"	3:30
4.	"Looking for Love"	6:33
5.	"Here I Go Again '87 (Radio Mix)" (Coverdale, Marsden)	3:55
6.	"Crying in the Rain" (Coverdale)	5:37
7.	"Is This Love"	4:43
8.	"Straight for the Heart"	3:40
9.	"Don't Turn Away"	5:11
10.	"Children of the Night"	4:24

20th Anniversary Edition
No.	Title	Length
1.	"Still of the Night"	6:38
2.	"Give Me All Your Love"	3:30
3.	"Bad Boys"	4:09
4.	"Is This Love"	4:43
5.	"Here I Go Again" (Coverdale, Marsden)	4:33
6.	"Straight for the Heart"	3:40
7.	"Looking for Love"	6:33
8.	"Children of the Night"	4:24
9.	"You're Gonna Break My Heart Again"	4:11
10.	"Crying in the Rain" (Coverdale)	5:37
11.	"Don't Turn Away"	5:11
12.	"Give Me All Your Love" (live, taken from Live: In the Shadow of the Blues)	4:27
13.	"Is This Love" (live, taken from Live: In the Shadow of the Blues)	4:58
14.	"Here I Go Again" (live, taken from Live: In the Shadow of the Blues)	5:53
15.	"Still of the Night" (live, taken from Live: In the Shadow of the Blues)	8:38

20th Anniversary Edition DVD
No.	Title	Length
1.	"Still of the Night" (music video)	6:24
2.	"Here I Go Again" (music video)	4:34
3.	"Is This Love" (music video)	4:35
4.	"Give Me All Your Love" (music video)	4:00
5.	"Give Me All Your Love" (from Live... In the Still of the Night)	4:43
6.	"Is This Love" (from Live... In the Still of the Night)	4:15
7.	"Here I Go Again" (from Live... In the Still of the Night)	5:19
8.	"Still of the Night" (from Live... In the Still of the Night)	6:44

30th Anniversary Edition

Box set includes several CDs and DVDs

Original Album (2017 Remaster)

1. "Still of the Night" - 6:40
2. "Give Me All Your Love" - 3:30
3. "Bad Boys" - 4:08
4. "Is This Love" - 4:45
5. "Here I Go Again 87" - 4:36
6. "Straight for the Heart" - 3:38
7. "Looking for Love" - 6:35
8. "Children of the Night" - 4:23
9. "You're Gonna Break My Heart Again" - 4:12
10. "Crying in the Rain" - 5:38
11. "Don't Turn Away" - 5:10

Snakeskin Boots (Live on Tour 1987–88)

1. "Bad Boys / Children of the Night" - 6:56
2. "Slide It In" - 4:10
3. "Slow an' Easy" - 7:51
4. "Here I Go Again" - 5:25
5. "Guilty of Love" - 7:43
6. "Is This Love" - 4:27
7. "Love Ain't No Stranger" - 4:47
8. "Guitar Solo (Adrian & Vivian)" - 2:45
9. "Crying in the Rain" - 6:38
10. "Still of the Night" - 7:33
11. "Ain't No Love in the Heart of the City" - 8:46
12. "Give Me All Your Love" - 5:25

'87 Evolutions (Demo & Rehearsals)

1. "Still of the Night" - 8:12
2. "Give Me All Your Love" - 6:07
3. "Bad Boys" - 5:34
4. "Is This Love" - 5:15
5. "Straight for the Heart" - 4:48
6. "Looking for Love" - 7:01
7. "Children of the Night" - 5:01
8. "You're Gonna Break My Heart Again" - 5:28
9. "Crying in the Rain" - 7:08
10. "Don't Turn Away" - 6:35
11. "Crying in the Rain (Lil' Mountain Alternate Take) [Ruff Mix]" - 5:41

'87 Versions (2017 Remixes)

1. "Still of the Night" - 6:32
2. "Is This Love" - 5:26
3. "Give Me All Your Love" - 3:28
4. "Here I Go Again '87" - 4:32
5. "Standing in the Shadows (1987 Version)" - 3:49
6. "Looking for Love (1987 Version)" - 6:25
7. "You're Gonna Break My Heart Again (1987 Version)" - 4:10
8. "Need Your Love So Bad (1987 Version)" - 3:17
9. "Here I Go Again (Radio Mix)" - 3:52
10. "Give Me All Your Love (Single Version)" - 3:15

More Fourplay - The Classic MTV Videos (Restored & Remixed In 5.1)

1. DVD-1.1 - Still of the Night
2. DVD-1.2 - Here I Go Again
3. DVD-1.3 - Is This Love
4. DVD-1.4 - Give Me All Your Love

Video Memories - The Making of '87 Album

1. DVD-2 Documentary

Purplesnake Video Jam

1. DVD-3 Here I Go Again

1987 Tour Video Bootleg

1. DVD-4.1 - Crying in the Rain (Music Video)
2. DVD-4.2 - Band Intros
3. DVD-4.3 - Still of the Night (Music Video)

2018 Remaster (Streaming services exclusive (iTunes & Spotify), North American version expanded tracklist)
No.	Title	Length
1.	"Crying In the Rain '87" (Coverdale)	5:38
2.	"Bad Boys"	4:06
3.	"Still of the Night"	6:38
4.	"Here I Go Again '87" (Coverdale, Marsden)	4:35
5.	"Give Me All Your Love"	3:28
6.	"Is This Love"	4:44
7.	"Children of the Night"	4:23
8.	"Straight for the Heart"	3:37
9.	"Don't Turn Away"	5:06
10.	"Looking for Love"	6:31
11.	"You're Gonna Break My Heart Again"	4:13

== Personnel ==
Credits are adapted from the album's liner notes and Apple Music.

Whitesnake

- David Coverdale – vocals
- John Sykes – guitar, backing vocals
- Neil Murray – bass
- Aynsley Dunbar – drums, percussion

Additional musicians

- Don Airey – keyboards (session)
- Bill Cuomo – keyboards
- Adrian Vandenberg – guitar solo (Here I Go Again '87)
- Dann Huff – guitar (Here I Go Again '87 – Radio Mix)
- Mark Andes – bass (Here I Go Again '87 – Radio Mix)
- Denny Carmassi – drums (Here I Go Again '87 – Radio Mix)
- Vivian Campbell – guitar solo (Give Me All Your Love – '88 Mix)
- Tommy Funderburk – backing vocals (Here I Go Again '87, Is This Love, Still of the Night, Give Me All Your Love, Don't Turn Away)

Technical

- Mike Stone – producer
- Keith Olsen – producer, mixing (at Goodnight Los Angeles)
- Greg Fulginiti – mastering (at Artisan Sound Recorders)
- Stephen Marcussen – direct metal mastering

Design

- Hugh Syme – art direction, emblem design, cover concept development
- Koh Sakai – liner notes (Japanese version only)
- Masa Ito – liner notes (Japanese version only)

Reissue

- David Coverdale, Hugh Gilmour, Michael McIntyre – compiler
- Hugh Gilmour – A&R, design, & liner notes
- Dave Donelly & Michael McIntyre – remastering (at DNA Mastering, Los Angeles; cut at Abbey Road Studios, London) (2017 remaster)
- Jeremiah "Luke" Wynn – assistant engineer & sonic archivist
- Bjorn Thorsud – additional Pro Tools engineering
- Helen Owens – product manager (2007, 2015 reissue)
- Bethany Dawson – product manager (2017 reissue)
- Sarah O'Shea – production & packaging manager
- Scott Hull – remastering (2018 remaster) (streaming only)

== Charts ==
=== Weekly charts ===
Chart (1987–1988)	Peak position
Australian Albums (Kent Music Report)	23
Austrian Albums (Ö3 Austria)	25
Canada Top Albums/CDs (RPM)	5
Dutch Albums (Album Top 100)	27
European Albums (Music & Media)	13
Finnish Albums (Suomen virallinen lista)	3
German Albums (Offizielle Top 100)	13
Japanese Albums (Oricon)	19
New Zealand Albums (RMNZ)	2
Norwegian Albums (VG-lista)	10
Spanish Albums (AFYVE)	27
Swedish Albums (Sverigetopplistan)	8
Swiss Albums (Schweizer Hitparade)	10
UK Albums (Official Charts)	8
US Billboard 200	2
US Cash Box 200	1

Chart (2017)	Peak position
Hungarian Albums (MAHASZ)	38
Japanese Albums (Oricon)	22
Japanese Hot Albums (Billboard Japan)	37
Portuguese Albums (AFP)	36
Scottish Albums (Official Charts)	34
Spanish Albums (Promusicae)	81
UK Albums (OCC)	93
UK Rock & Metal Albums (Official Charts)	3

=== Year-end charts ===
Chart (1987)	Position
Canada Top Albums/CDs (RPM)	15
European Albums (Music & Media)	23
German Albums (Offizielle Top 100)	34
UK Albums (Gallup)	39
US Billboard 200	16
US Cash Box 200	7

Chart (1988)	Position
Canada Top Albums/CDs (RPM)	44
US Billboard 200	19

=== All-time chart ===
Chart	Position
US Billboard 200	133

== Certifications ==
Region	Certification	Certified units/sales
Canada (Music Canada)	5× Platinum	500,000^{^}
Germany (BVMI)	Gold	250,000^{^}
New Zealand (RMNZ)	Platinum	15,000^{^}
Sweden (GLF)	Gold	50,000^{^}
Switzerland (IFPI Switzerland)	Gold	25,000^{^}
United Kingdom (BPI)	Platinum	300,000^{^}
United States (RIAA)	8× Platinum	8,000,000
Summaries
Worldwide	—	25,000,000
^{^} Shipments figures based on certification alone.

== Release history ==
Release formats for 1987
Region	Date	Label	Format	Edition	Ref.
United States	16 March 1987	Geffen; Warner Bros.	LP; CD; cassette	Standard	
Europe	30 March 1987	EMI	LP; CD; cassette	Standard	
Japan	22 April 1987	CBS/Sony	LP; CD; cassette	Standard	
North America	31 May 2007	Geffen; UM^{e}	CD; DVD	20th	
Europe; UK	4 June 2007	EMI	CD; DVD	20th	
Japan	23 April 2008	Universal	SHM-CD	Standard	
Various	6 October 2017	Rhino; Parlophone	CD; LP; digital download; streaming	30th Deluxe	
Japan	25 October 2017	Rhino; Warner Music Japan	SHM-CD; DVD; LP	30th Super Deluxe	
Various	27 October 2017	Rhino; Parlophone	CD; DVD	30th Super Deluxe	
Various	2 November 2018	Rhino	Streaming; digital download	Standard	
Various	18 September 2026	Craft Recordings; Concord	LP	Reissue	
