= The Definitive Collection (Whitesnake album) =

Compilation album by Whitesnake
- Released: 7 February 2006
- Recorded: Various, 1978-1989
- Genres: Hard rock, blues rock, heavy metal
- Length: 79:01
- Label: Geffen

Whitesnake chronology
The Early Years (2004)	The Definitive Collection (2006)	Live... In the Still of the Night (2006)

Professional ratings
Review scores
Source	Rating
AllMusic	4/5 stars

The Definitive Collection is a compilation album by British-American rock band Whitesnake. Released in 2006, this album features most of the band's biggest hits on one CD. The song "Pride and Joy" is not a Whitesnake song, but rather a song by Coverdale•Page.

As of 2014 it has sold 104,846 copies in US.

== Track listing ==
1. "Don't Break My Heart Again" - 4:04
2. "Walking in the Shadow of the Blues" - 4:18
3. "Ain't No Love in the Heart of the City" - 5:05
4. "Ready an' Willing" - 3:14
5. "Slide It In" - 3:21
6. "Love Ain't No Stranger" - 4:14
7. "Slow an' Easy" - 6:10
8. "Fool for Your Loving '89" - 4:09
9. "Judgement Day" - 5:12
10. "The Deeper the Love" - 4:18
11. "Now You're Gone" - 4:08
12. "Looking for Love" - 6:27
13. "Give Me All Your Love" - 3:27
14. "Is This Love" - 4:39
15. "Here I Go Again '87" - 4:32
16. "Still of the Night" - 6:37
17. "Pride and Joy" - 3:32
18. "We Wish You Well" - 1:34
