= Here I Go Again =

1982 single by Whitesnake

Single by Whitesnake

from the album Saints & Sinners
- B-side: "Bloody Luxury"
- Released: 25 October 1982
- Recorded: 1981–1982
- Studio: Rock City (Shepperton); The Truck Mobile at Clearwell Castle (Gloucestershire); Britannia Row (London); Battery Studios (London)
- Genre: Hard rock; blues rock
- Length: 5:09
- Label: Liberty
- Songwriters: David Coverdale; Bernie Marsden
- Producer: Martin Birch

Whitesnake singles chronology
"Would I Lie to You" (1981)	"Here I Go Again" (1982)	"Victim of Love" (1982)

Music video
- "Here I Go Again" on YouTube

"Here I Go Again"

Single by Whitesnake

from the album Whitesnake
- B-side: "Children of the Night" (US) "Guilty of Love" (UK)
- Released: June 1987 (US); 19 October 1987 (UK)
- Recorded: September 1985 – November 1986
- Studio: Little Mountain (Vancouver); Phase One (Toronto) Compass Point (Nassau); Cherokee (Hollywood); One on One (North Hollywood); Goodnight L.A. (Los Angeles)
- Genre: Glam metal
- Length: 4:36 (album version); 3:54 (radio edit mix)
- Label: Geffen
- Songwriters: David Coverdale; Bernie Marsden
- Producers: Mike Stone; Keith Olsen

Whitesnake singles chronology
"Still of the Night" (1987)	"Here I Go Again" (1987)	"Is This Love" (1987)

Music video
- "Here I Go Again '87" on YouTube

"Here I Go Again" is a song by the British rock band Whitesnake. It was originally released on their 1982 album Saints & Sinners through Liberty in October 1982. The song was written by David Coverdale and Bernie Marsden, and produced by Martin Birch.

The song was re-recorded for their 1987 self-titled album, and was released as the album's lead single. A radio-mix version of the song, featuring a different performance by the band and omitting the song's original keyboard intro was released in June 1987 in the United States and 19 October in their native UK.

"Here I Go Again" received positive reviews, with some critics referring to the song as the "signature tune for Coverdale and Whitesnake". The original recording only hit number 34 on the UK Singles Chart, and remained on the chart for five weeks, while charting in Australia and Germany, peaking at 53 and 51, respectively. In the United States, both the original song and the original Saints & Sinners album had failed to chart due to it not being released there, but the re-recording eventually reached number one on the Billboard Hot 100 chart as a sleeper hit and remained there for one week, being the band's only number-one single of that chart in their discography to date. It also peaked at number four on the Billboard Mainstream Rock chart. The re-recording also peaked at number nine in the UK. "Here I Go Again" is certified platinum by the British Phonographic Industry (BPI). It also reached number one in Canada, and the top ten in the Netherlands and Ireland, while it charted in several other countries.

In 2018 at the BMI London Awards, it received the "5 Million Performances Award", while in 2024, it garnered the "9 Million-Air Award".

== Background and writing ==
The song was written by lead singer David Coverdale and former Whitesnake guitarist Bernie Marsden in late 1981 when Coverdale had retreated to a small villa in southern Portugal. During that time, Coverdale's marriage with his wife Julia became strained, which "fueled my [song]writing". This provoked him to write the song within an hour and record it with the band, but troubled production and the line-up caused the band to go on a hiatus by January 1982. By August, the band had re-grouped with a slightly different line-up and introduced their fifth studio album in November. According to Coverdale, "Here I Go Again" and "Crying in the Rain" both have similar compositions as "documenting the breakdown—the breakup of my first marriage".

The composition began as a two-track demo at Marsden's residence in Buckingham, "with the opening line ‘I don't know where I'm going’, the chorus and the riff. It existed towards the end of the sessions for the previous album". He also asserted that it was written over Coverdale's divorce or "that it was written on a boat in Venezuela, which always mystified me.” "Here I Go Again" was composed at the end of the Come an' Get It recording sessions, where an attempt was made to lay down the tracks in Rock City Studios in Shepperton back in January 1981. Another attempt was made to record the song, this time at Clearwell Castle. According to Marsden, he approached Coverdale about the demo then changed some of the lyrics in Coverdale's approval completed within "an hour", simply because it "was cool, because he's the guy who's gonna sing the song."

Not long after that, the song was finished, and the composition was shown to the band, to which the members responded with approval. Jon Lord started the song with a hook into a Hammond organ, which impressed Marsden while playing guitar riffs on it. The song was the last recording the band had the instrumental tracks for Saints & Sinners before the hiatus. Coverdale said, "We mixed the single on a Tuesday, cut it, delivered it to EMI at midnight, by Wednesday it was on its way to the factory and by Friday it was on the air."

The most notable difference between the original and re-recorded versions is a slight change in the bluesy lyrics and pace. The re-recording of the song in 1987 was advised by record labels bosses Al Coury and David Geffen as a negotiation deal with Coverdale to re-record "Crying in the Rain" for the band's self-titled album Whitesnake, released in 1987.

In the album track-by-track interview recorded in 2017, Coverdale said:

It wasn't written for the '87 album, it was originally recorded back on the Saints & Sinners album. 81-82? I'm not sure. And Geffen asked me to redo it, which I wasn't very keen on, but I said, "Okay, well if you want me to do that. I want to redo 'Crying in the Rain', because I was never really happy with the original." And John, Neil and I worked on an amazing instrumental section in the middle, very symphonic, which featured, at that time, highlighted Cozy Powell and I thought it's gonna be great to have that too. But we actually had written enough material for a full album without "Here I Go Again" and "Crying in the Rain".

The chorus of the original version features the lines:

And here I go again on my own
Going down the only road I've ever known
Like a hobo I was born to walk alone

In an interview, Coverdale explained that initially the lyrics had "drifter" but as that was already used in different songs he decided to use "hobo" instead. However, the lyric was changed back to "drifter" in the re-recorded '87 version, reportedly to ensure that it would not be misheard as "homo".

The song was used in the climax of romantic comedy film Man Up (2015).

== Composition ==
The composition is in the key of G major and a tempo of 91 BPM. The key tuning of the 1987 album version and the "radio-mix" version was similar to the original 1982 recording.

== Chart performance ==
The original 1982 single "Here I Go Again" charted within the top 40, debuting at number 65 on 6 November 1982, then peaking at number 34 on 4 December on the UK Singles Chart. The single remained on that chart for 11 weeks with the last week at number 99 on 15 January 1983. The single charted in Germany, debuting at number 69 at the end of January 1983, then peaking at number 51 on 7 March for a total spent of 12 weeks on that chart. It also charted in Australia, where it peaked at number 53.

The re-recorded version (collectively titled "Here I Go Again 87'") became an international breakthrough single, commercially, where it debuted at number 80 on the Billboard Hot 100 on 4 July 1987, before eventually peaking at the top spot on 10 October for one week. "Here I Go Again" was Whitesnake's only number one single in the US and Canada in their discography. It also peaked at number four on the US Billboard Mainstream Rock Airplay chart and stayed for a total of 19 weeks, making it the longest band's single to remain on that chart. The re-recorded version was more successful than the original recording in the UK chart, where it peaked at number nine in the UK on 28 November, staying at 11 weeks on that chart.

In total, the single charted in a total of nine countries between the consecutive years of 1987 through 1988. By the year-end of 1987, the track remained in four countries, with that being on the US Cash Box Top 100 at number six and charting at number seven on the main Hot 100 chart. The track entered the Norway charts for the first time in the 39th week on 2007, charting at number 17. "Here I Go Again", alongside the 1982 recording, charted in a total of 10 countries. Following the death of Tawny Kitaen in 2021, the single debuted at number one on Billboard's Hot Hard Rock Songs chart on 22 May 2021 and number twenty-one on Billboard's Hot Rock & Alternative Songs chart, to which it drew 2.5 million U.S. streams, up by 22 percent than the previous week, and sold approximately 1,000 song downloads, according to MRC data, totaling at 1,766 (minimum) to 1,800 sold in the US (according to the RIAA album-equivalent streaming sales unit).

== Music video ==
The '82 music video features the band performing the song onstage. The music video for the '87 re-recorded version was directed by Marty Callner. The video includes, besides the band's stage performance, appearances by model Julie E. "Tawny" Kitaen, who was married to Whitesnake's David Coverdale from 1989 to 1991. Her notable sex-appeal was immediately recognized; she filmed memorable unchoreographed scenes dressed "in a white negligee, writhing and cartwheeling across the hoods of two Jaguars XJ" which belonged to Coverdale (white) and Callner (black). Coverdale recalls that he brought choreographer Paula Abdul to the set to show Tawny some moves, but Abdul exclaimed that Tawny was already so accomplished regarding this video that she couldn't "show her anything". Coverdale's iconic white Jaguar once again appeared in the music video for the single "Shut Up & Kiss Me" from the 2019 studio album Flesh & Blood.

The song's 1987 music video was listed as one of the 15 Essential Hair-Metal Videos by The New York Times.

== Single versions ==
There are several different versions of the song, all recorded officially by Whitesnake.

- The original version from the 1982 Saints & Sinners album with Jon Lord on Hammond organ and Bernie Marsden and Micky Moody on guitar (5:03).
- The re-recorded version that appears on the Whitesnake (aka 1987) album with John Sykes on guitar (solo by Adrian Vandenberg) (4:36).
- A 1987 "radio-mix" version, asked for by Geffen, which was released as a United States single with Denny Carmassi on drums, Mark Andes on bass and Dann Huff on guitar, who also provided the new arrangement, which included an intro without keyboards and no Coverdale vocal intro verse. This version topped the charts, and appeared on the Greatest Hits album in 1994 (3:54).

In 1987, EMI released a limited Collectors Poster Edition 'USA Single Remix' 7" vinyl [EMP 35], the B-side of which consists of an engraved signature version, and the sleeve of which unfolds into a poster of the band. In 1997 Whitesnake recorded an acoustic version, released on their Starkers in Tokyo live album.

== Impact and legacy ==
In 2003, Martin Popoff listed the song at number 274 in The Top 500 Heavy Metal Songs of All Time, while Q magazine ranked it at 962 on their list of the "1001 Best Songs Ever". In 2006, the 1987 version was ranked number 17 on VH1's "100 Greatest Songs of the '80s". In 2008, The Times included it in their top 11 "heavy metal at its best" list. In the 2012 Reader's Poll of Rolling Stone, it ranked 9th among the top 10 "Best Hair Metal Songs of All Time". In 2015, "Sleazegrinder" of Louder included the song in his list of "The 20 Greatest Hair Metal Anthems Of All Time", placing it at number 9. In 2017, The Daily Telegraph included it among the top 21 best power ballads.

The song has been covered by many artists and celebrities, notably Kelly Clarkson.

== Personnel ==
Credits are adapted from Saints & Sinners and Whitesnake (1987) liner notes and Apple Music.

Whitesnake (1982 Version)

- David Coverdale – vocals
- Bernie Marsden – guitars
- Micky Moody – guitars, backing vocals
- Neil Murray – bass
- Ian Paice – drums
- Jon Lord – keyboards
- Mel Galley – backing vocals

Technical

- Martin Birch – producer, engineer, mixing (at Battery Studios)
- Bryan New – assistant engineer
- Guy Bidmead – engineer
- Steve Angel – mastering

Whitesnake (1987 Version)

- David Coverdale – vocals
- John Sykes – guitars, backing vocals
- Adrian Vandenberg – guitar solo
- Neil Murray – bass
- Aynsley Dunbar – drums, percussion
- Don Airey – keyboards (session)
- Bill Cuomo – keyboards

Technical

- Mike Stone – producer
- Keith Olsen – producer, mixing (at Goodnight Los Angeles)
- Greg Fulginiti – mastering (at Artisan Sound Recorders)
- Stephen Marcussen – direct metal mastering

Whitesnake (1987 radio-mix version)

- David Coverdale – vocals
- Dann Huff – guitars
- Mark Andes – bass
- Denny Carmassi – drums
- Tommy Funderburk – backing vocals
- Don Airey – keyboards
- Bill Cuomo – keyboards

== Chart performance ==
This song is notable for being the only Whitesnake song to get significant airplay on adult contemporary stations despite not registering at all on the AC charts while "Is This Love" did, reaching No. 38.

== Charts ==
=== Weekly charts ===
Chart (1982–1983)	Peak position
Australia (Kent Music Report)	53
UK Singles (Official Charts)	34
West Germany (GfK)	51

Chart (1987–1988)	Peak position
Australia (Kent Music Report)	24
Belgium (Ultratop 50 Flanders)	17
Canada Top Singles (RPM)	1
European Top 100 Singles (Music & Media)	11
Netherlands (Dutch Top 40)	5
Netherlands (Single Top 100)	6
Ireland (IRMA)	7
New Zealand (Recorded Music NZ)	34
UK Singles (Official Charts)	9
US Billboard Hot 100	1
US Mainstream Rock Airplay (Billboard)	4
US Cash Box Top 100	1
US CHR/Pop Airplay (Radio & Records)	1
West Germany (GfK)	29

Chart (2007)	Peak position
Norway (VG-lista)	17

Chart (2009–2020)	Peak position
UK Rock & Metal Singles Chart	2
US Hard Rock Digital Song Sales (Billboard)	2
US Rock Digital Song Sales (Billboard)	8

Chart (2021)	Peak position
US Hot Rock & Alternative Songs (Billboard)	21
US Hot Hard Rock Songs (Billboard)	1

=== Year-end charts ===
Chart (1987)	Position
Canada Top Singles (RPM)	16
European Top 100 Singles (Music & Media)	28
Netherlands (Dutch Top 40)	68
Netherlands (Single Top 100)	82
UK Singles (Gallup)	88
US Billboard Hot 100	7
US Top Pop Singles	7
US Cash Box Top 100	82

== Certifications ==
Region	Certification	Certified units/sales
New Zealand (RMNZ)	3× Platinum	90,000^{‡}
United Kingdom (BPI)	Platinum	600,000^{‡}
United Kingdom (BPI) 1987 version/2018 release	Silver	200,000^{‡}
^{‡} Sales+streaming figures based on certification alone.

== Release history ==
Release formats for Here I Go Again
Region	Date	Label	Format	Ref.
Various	25 October 1982	Liberty	7"; cassette	
North America	June 1987	Geffen	7"; cassette	
Japan	26 August 1987	CBS/Sony	7"	
Germany	7 September 1987	EMI	7"; cassette; 10"; 12"	
UK	19 October 1987	EMI	7"; cassette; 10"; 12"	
UK	9 November 1987	EMI	7"; cassette; 10"; 12"	

== Cover versions ==
- A dance cover by Frash was a minor hit in the UK in 1995, reaching No. 69.
- In 2004, a dance/pop take of "Here I Go Again" was recorded by Polish dancer and singer Mandaryna. Released as the debut single from her debut album Mandaryna.com, it became a hit in Poland. It was later remixed by Axel Konrad of Groove Coverage for the single release in German speaking countries.
