= Saints & Sinners (Whitesnake album) =

Studio album by Whitesnake
- Released: 15 November 1982
- Recorded: 1981–January 1982; August–October 1982
- Studios: Rock City, Shepperton; The Truck Mobile, Clearwell Castle, Gloucestershire; Britannia Row Studios, London; Battery Studios, London
- Genres: Hard rock; blues rock
- Length: 39:16
- Label: Liberty/EMI
- Producer: Martin Birch

Whitesnake chronology
Come an' Get It (1981)	Saints & Sinners (1982)	Slide It In (1984)

Singles from Saints & Sinners
- 1. "Here I Go Again" / "Bloody Luxury" Released: 25 October 1982; 2. "Victim of Love" Released: 20 May 1983 (Ger.)

Saints & Sinners (sometimes referred as Saints An' Sinners) is the fifth studio album by British rock band Whitesnake, released on 15 November 1982 by Liberty Records. It was the last album to be recorded by the Ready an' Willing line-up as the members relations had become strained about the musical direction and with the band's management, despite commercial successes in their native country. Guy Bidmead initially produced the album as Martin Birch's (who produced all of the past Whitesnake releases) replacement, but Birch returned to finish production on the album.

Despite the band's troubles during the recording, the album peaked at number nine on the UK Albums Chart and was certified gold, continuing a string of gold or platinum-certified albums by the British Phonographic Industry (BPI). The album included the single "Here I Go Again", released in October 1982, that charted at number 34, but did not chart on any of the singles charts in the United States. Eventually, it would resurface in 1987, with a newly-recorded version that would characterise Whitesnake in the future.

== Background ==
In the early 1980s, Whitesnake was successful with continental Europe and Japanese audiences but success remained elusive in North America. Their radically successful, Come an' Get It album alongside the supporting tour proved successful in several countries, including their first appearance at the Monsters of Rock festival that same year. The tour lasted for five months before the writing for the upcoming album would start immediately with singer David Coverdale. To rekindle their relations, the band set their recordings at Clearwell Castle in Gloucestershire, where they had previously recorded their second studio album Lovehunter.

The group planned to add new countries to tour coinciding their upcoming album. Coverdale was enthusiastic about the group's recent successes which he added, "We are still experiencing a creative outburst and want to take advantage of it while we're can. If we are out of the public's eye too long, then we become forgotten. We want to catch the excitement now."

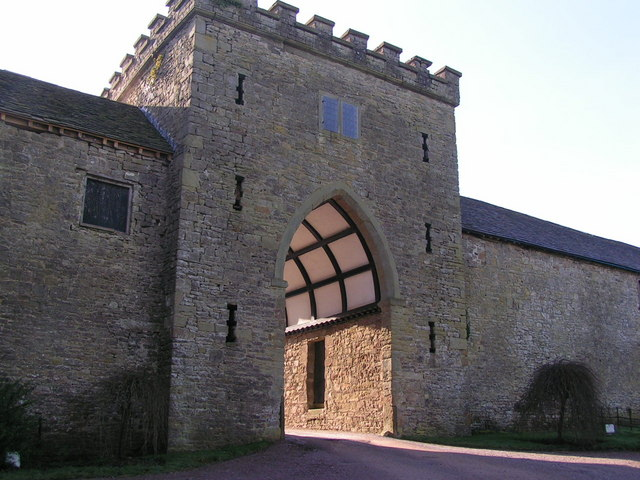
Most of the album's backing multi-tracks were recorded at Clearwell Castle before the production got moved.

== Production and internal tensions ==
During the recording, morale was low, due to exhaustion and the excesses of success. Apparently, eight of the nine drum tracks were completed there, the other being recorded in Rock City Studios. Moody recalled in an interview in 1997 that the band had eventually become tired, partially from "too many late nights, too much partying". Nevertheless, they were able to finish all multi-track session recordings for the next album. Guy Bidmead, who would later produce with Motörhead, was chosen to replace Martin Birch due to an illness that refrained Birch from working. Birch eventually returned to produce when the recording got moved to Britannia Row Studios, then to Battery Studios. The changes of recording venue caused the band's relations to further deteriorate. To make matters worse, the band was experiencing a huge hit with their finances, which Moody recalled:

We weren't making nowhere near the kind of money we should have been making. Whitesnake always seemed to be in debt, and I thought "What is this? We're playing in some of the biggest places and we're still being told we're in debt, where is all the money going?". We hadn't got much money out of it and to be told you're 200,000 pounds in debt, when you just had six golden albums. It wasn't just me, cause everybody was getting tired, pissed off and losing their sense of identity. It was over by then, we couldn't get any further. It's difficult for a band to go more than three or four years without getting tired of each other and losing ideas. Nothing lasts forever. Everybody wanted to do something different after a few years, a solo album or write with someone else.

By January 1982, all of the backing tracks for the upcoming project were near completion, but Coverdale spent the Christmas break assessing the situation and "decided the time had come to sort out the future of Whitesnake before things got any worse". He then called for a meeting with all the members to plan to dismiss John Coletta, former Deep Purple manager and his company Seabreeze. Apparently, the group had not been satisfied with the financial state caused by a majority of music publishers. Alongside Coletta's dismissal, the majority of the members were informed that Whitesnake had been put on hold and that they had been fired. Moody said, "I didn't know what was going on and I didn't really care. I spoke to David and he said 'I'm putting the band on ice' or on a holding pattern or whatever and I said fair enough, I've had enough anyway," leading to his dismissal. On the contrary, in Coverdale's view, Micky "elected to go to a darts match at his local pub instead". During the recording of Saints & Sinners, Paice became increasingly "distant and unfocused." Coverdale attempted to address the issue privately with Paice, hoping to understand what was troubling him, but this ultimately resulted in Coverdale dismissing Paice from the band. With Coletta out of the picture, the rest of the band's management and the line-up was at stake. Marsden later remarked that "David [Coverdale] decided he would be king of Whitesnake". Coverdale stated that while the band members were "cruising along on gold status," he personally aspired to achieve the greater success of "hungry for platinum." Ultimately, the upcoming tour and its upcoming album coinciding the tour were scheduled in March had already been shelved. Marsden remained with the group until another meeting in April, later informing him that he was let go. The group were planning to visit Japan but that was also ditched during the meeting. Only Jon Lord remained with the band during the band's hiatus. Originally, the album was planned to be released on February and March, but this was later shelved due to the group's temporary disbandment.

According to Coverdale, his decision to put the band on hold stemmed from his daughter, Jessica, contracting bacterial meningitis, which purportedly gave him the courage to cut ties with Coletta. He ended up buying himself out of his contracts, which reportedly cost him over a million dollars. "Lots of decisions were being taken that I disagreed with 100 per cent, it was terrible, terrible. Incidentally, I also engineered it for the rest of the guys to be contractually free, but nobody's ever said thank you.... it proved very expensive but I'm pleased it's sorted out at last because in the final analysis the buck stops with me. It rests on my ass and I'm sick of picking up the pieces of other people's mistakes. I'm not perfect but I'm going for as close as possible to that," Coverdale said. As for the firing of Marsden, Murray and Paice, Coverdale felt they lacked the needed enthusiasm to keep working in Whitesnake. Coverdale stated that it was "a business decision, not personal".

There are astonishing emotional memories of those times, but the reality was there wasn’t the financial rewards coming in. And my daughter’s serious illness told me very clearly that this was the only time I should have my head in my hands and be worried about being unable to change the circumstances. It was necessary for me to experience that so I could stand up and be counted, and give me the backbone to make life-affecting decisions. I put Saints & Sinners on hold to be with her.

— David Coverdale on pausing the group.

=== Reformation ===
Coverdale estimated that severing ties with the management and publishers would require approximately 18 months, a process that, he believed, would have marked the end of his career. After waiting for his daughter to recuperate and severing ties with his company within six months, and by 5 August, Coverdale slowly began putting Whitesnake back together. As an obligation to sign into any record labels, Coverdale agreed to pay off any existing Whitesnake's debt. New members were brought into the group, namely former Trapeze guitarist Mel Galley, former Rainbow drummer Cozy Powell and veteran bassist Colin Hodgkinson. Powell, who had been aware of the group's hiatus, asked Coverdale to join Michael Schenker Group with him. Talks sprung that Coverdale was planning to audition for the group, but he denied the rumours. Coverdale was impressed about Powell's drumming skills and counteracted by encouraging him to join "the next chapter of Whitesnake" and Powell accepted that premise. Another meeting was commenced in mid-August to introduce new members of the group. Lord referred Coverdale to Hodgkinson through Pete York, as the band's new bassist. Within a few days, Hodgkinson officially joined the group. Coverdale called Moody and asked him to return to the band. According to Moody, Coverdale wanted him to "finish the Saints & Sinners album" and implement "some backing vocals, etc". Within three weeks, Coverdale completed the band's new record with Martin Birch in October at Battery Studios, with the majority of the album having already been recorded with Marsden, Murray, Paice, Moody and Lord before the hiatus. Birch mixed the entire record, which was then mastered by Steve Angel.

=== Music and lyrics ===
Saints & Sinners compromises a bluesier pub-rock approach that is straight-forwardly accessed to past Whitesnsnake's albums. Accessing its lyrical theme, Eduardo Rivadavia from AllMusic describes its composition as "rowdy outbursts of bluesy aggression" in "Rough an' Ready" and "Bloody Luxury".

Geoff Barton, writing for the album, cites the lyrics as "more commercial" and takes on the lyrics as far on Coverdale's directness to the critics and "suitably sexed up" on that approach, such as "Love an' Affection". "Crying in the Rain" features a blues slower-tempo approach aided by Marsden's guitar in the beginning compared to the 1987 re-recording, where it was proposed as "electrifying" and "intense". Coverdale states that the song was particularly misunderstood by himself, which others viewed the song more into Black Sabbath. Furthermore, it was viewed as "bloody-minded brilliance, power and passion". "Here I Go Again" was particularly inspired by Coverdale's divorce from his first wife, which was then helped written out by Marsden. The song pleasantly states as a prolonged life story Coverdale had envisioned during that time.

== Release and promotion ==
Saints & Sinners was released on 15 November 1982 in the UK by Liberty in Europe and through Polydor in Japan. The album did not receive a North American release, due to the fact that Coverdale had cut ties with Mirage/Atlantic Records (which released their back-catalogue in the US from 1980) and the rest of the publishing management. On March 1988, the album was issued a North American release through Geffen Records, alongside past Whitesnake releases from former labels in the US. Saints & Sinners charted in nine countries where it peaked at number nine in their native UK two days after its initial release, and by 6 December, it had been certified silver by the BPI for sales of over 60,000 copies in the UK. However, reports showed that it had sold over 100,000 copies there, thus receiving a gold certification. In Japan, it only peaked a spot lower, going one spot below their preceding 1981's Come an' Get It, coming in at number 42. The album charted at number seven in Finland, the highest album number to chart. Overall, sales for the album showed some disappointment compared to their previous albums. "Sinners [sic] was a struggle from start to finish," Coverdale recalled.

"Here I Go Again" and "Victim of Love" were released as singles from the album, with the former peaking at number thirty-four on the UK Singles Chart, where it spent 11 weeks. A music video was produced for "Here I Go Again", directed by Maurice Phillips, featuring the band performing on stage that included the supporting album tour line-up, featuring new band members Mel Galley, Cozy Powell and Colin Hodgkinson. Internationally, the single never charted in the United States, until the 1987 re-recording for their self-titled album, peaked at number one on the US Billboard Hot 100 Chart, where it became their most popular song in the band's song discography, namely as the band's 80s "anthem". The re-recording also peaked at number nine in the native UK. Both versions were certified platinum and silver in the UK, respectively. Another single, "Victim of Love" was released in Germany, but failed to chart.

=== Reissue ===
Saints & Sinners was reissued by EMI Records on 12 March 2007 as a multi-disc box set, featuring remastered and previously unreleased demos and outtakes, including an unfinished track, "Soul Survivor". The album was part of a re-issue along with the earlier Whitesnake releases, not released by Rhino Entertainment.

The album was later released as part of "The Box 'O' Snakes" box set in November 2011, again with previous Whitesnake material which Coverdale calls that box set in The Blues Album complication interview in April 2020, "my final farewell to that era of Whitesnake's history". Alongside the past material, Coverdale said that the albums that were "cop[ied] digitally" possess the ability to be restored and remastered, but unfortunately cannot be remixed (with the exception of Slide It In and later Whitesnake Geffen Records material) as a result of the 2008 Universal Studios fire, that burned every "24-track masters" that was "lost or misplaced in the storage facility". After EMI was sold to Universal Music Group in 2011, following its back catalogue being later acquired by Warner Music Group, the rights to Saints & Sinners became split by region. Parlophone Records and Sunburst currently holds the album's copyrights in Europe, including other previously released Whitesnake material, while Geffen currently distributes the album in North America.

== Artwork ==
The sleeve resembled a Psyche Revived by Cupid's Kiss resin statue with a snake that was assembled by the group's merchandise staff using soft clay. However, the photoshoot of the statue did not impress Coverdale the way he envisioned it to be, mainly because of the heating from the lights. A change to reshoot was thrown out of the question because "as usual with us, everything was last minute & there was no time to change it."

== Touring ==
The supporting tour for Saints & Sinners began on 10 December 1982, in Southampton, and later went on to continental Europe and Japan, supporting Ozzy Osbourne. The band also played at Ruisrock Festival, then later at Monsters of Rock, where the recently released single "Guilty of Love" promotional video, was filmed in front of 40,000 people in the audience on 20 August 1983, later released as the band's first long-form video Whitesnake Commandos/Live at Donington 1983. The supporting tour ended in October 1983, after which Moody and Hodgkinson left the band and were replaced by guitarist John Sykes and returning bassist Neil Murray.

== Critical reception ==
Professional ratings
Review scores
Source	Rating
AllMusic	4/5 stars
Classic Rock	3.5/5 stars
Collector's Guide to Heavy Metal	7/10
MusicHound Rock	2.5/5 stars

Upon release, Saints & Sinners received mixed reviews from contemporary music critics.

== Track listing ==
Side one
No.	Title	Writer(s)	Length
1.	"Young Blood"	David Coverdale, Bernie Marsden	3:30
2.	"Rough an' Ready"	Coverdale, Micky Moody	2:52
3.	"Bloody Luxury"	Coverdale	3:23
4.	"Victim of Love"	Coverdale	3:33
5.	"Crying in the Rain"	Coverdale	6:00

Side two
No.	Title	Writer(s)	Length
6.	"Here I Go Again"	Coverdale, Marsden	5:08
7.	"Love an' Affection"	Coverdale, Moody	3:09
8.	"Rock an' Roll Angels"	Coverdale, Moody	4:07
9.	"Dancing Girls"	Coverdale	3:10
10.	"Saints an' Sinners"	Coverdale, Moody, Marsden, Neil Murray, Jon Lord, Ian Paice	4:25

2007 remastered bonus tracks
No.	Title	Writer(s)	Length
11.	"Young Blood" (monitor mix/early vocals)	Coverdale, Marsden	3:30
12.	"Saints an' Sinners" (monitor mix/early vocals)	Coverdale, Moody, Marsden, Murray, Lord, Paice	4:24
13.	"Soul Survivor" (unfinished, unreleased song)	Coverdale, Moody, Marsden	3:08

== Personnel ==
Credits are adapted from the album's liner notes.

Whitesnake

- David Coverdale – vocals
- Micky Moody – guitars, backing vocals
- Bernie Marsden – guitars
- Neil Murray – bass
- Jon Lord – keyboards, organs
- Ian Paice – drums

Additional musicians

- Mel Galley – backing vocals
- The Paratroopers (Coverdale, Galley, Moody) – backing vocals

Technical

- Martin Birch – producer, engineer, mixing (at Battery Studios)
- Bryan New – assistant engineer
- Guy Bidmead – engineer
- Steve Angel – mastering
- Greg Fulginiti – re-mastering (at Artisan Sound Recorders) [1988 North American Geffen Records release]

Design

- The Concert Publishing Company – album cover design
- Virginia Turbett – back cover photography
- Kyo Takeuchi – sleeve notes (Japanese version only)

Reissue

- David Coverdale – executive producer, project co-ordination
- Michael McIntyre – producer, project co-ordination
- Libby Jones – project, A&R co-ordination (in retrospect for EMI)
- Nigel Reeve – project, A&R co-ordination (in retrospect for EMI)
- Jo Brooks – project, A&R co-ordination (in retrospect for EMI)
- Hugh Gilmour – artwork re-mastering, re-issue
- Geoff Barton – reissue sleeve notes, research for Classic Rock
- Peter Mew – re-mastering (at Abbey Road Studios)

== Charts ==
Chart (1982–83)	Peak position
Australian Albums (Kent Music Report)	65
Austrian Albums (Ö3 Austria)	14
Finnish Albums (The Official Finnish Charts)	7
German Albums (Offizielle Top 100)	28
Japanese Albums (Oricon)	42
New Zealand Albums (RMNZ)	41
Spanish Albums (AFYVE)	41
Swedish Albums (Sverigetopplistan)	45
UK Albums (Official Charts)	9

Chart (2006)	Peak position
Japanese Albums (Oricon)	174

== Certifications ==
Region	Certification	Certified units/sales
United Kingdom (BPI)	Gold	100,000^{^}
Yugoslavia	—	14,349
^{^} Shipments figures based on certification alone.

== Release history ==
Release dates and formats for "Saints & Sinners"
Region	Date	Label(s)	Format(s)	Ref.
Various	15 November 1982	EMI; Liberty	LP; cassette	
Japan	10 December 1982	Polydor	LP; cassette	
Japan	1 December 1987	Polydor	CD	
North America	May 1988	Geffen	LP; cassette; CD	
UK	11 July 1994	EMI	CD	
Japan	8 December 1999	Polydor	CD	
UK	12 March 2007	EMI; Sunburst	CD	
Japan	11 April 2007	Universal Japan	SHM-CD	
Japan	4 July 2007	Universal Japan	SHM-CD	
Japan	8 October 2008	Universal Japan	SHM-CD	
Japan	21 December 2011	Universal Japan	SHM-CD	
Europe	13 May 2013	Parlophone	Digital download; streaming	
North America	28 July 2018	Geffen	Digital download; streaming	
