= Thomas Wyndham (of Clearwell Park) =

British lawyer and politician

Thomas Wyndham (c. 1686 – 12 December 1752) of Clearwell Court, Gloucestershire, Dunraven Castle, Glamorgan, and Cromer, Norfolk, was a British lawyer and politician who sat in the House of Commons from 1721 to 1734.

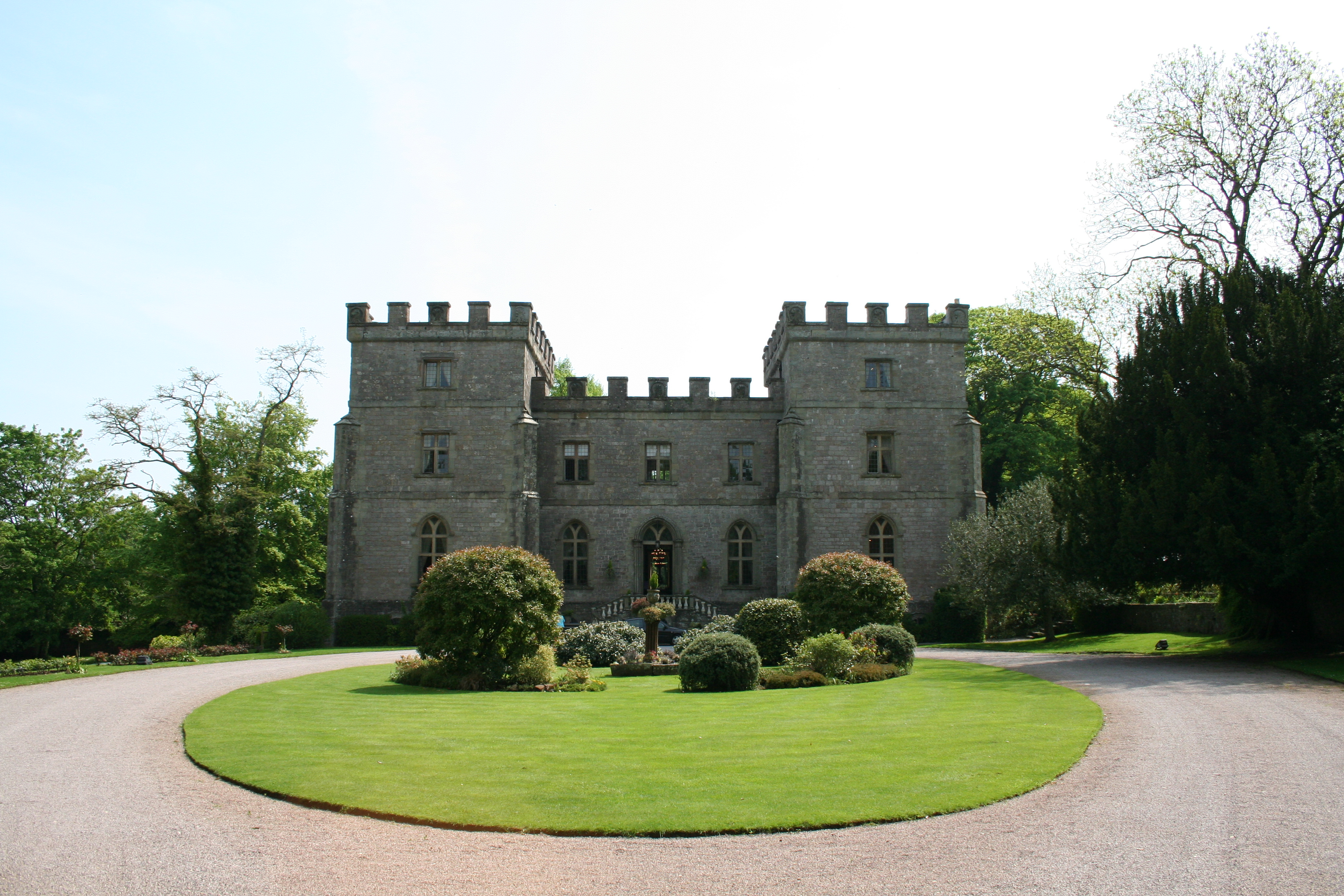
Clearwell Court in Gloucestershire – now known as Clearwell Castle

Wyndham was the second son of Francis Wyndham of Cromer, Norfolk and his wife Sarah Darell, daughter of Sir Thomas Darell. He was educated at Eton College in 1699 and was admitted at King's College, Cambridge in 1705. He became a fellow in 1707, was awarded BA in 1709 and was awarded MA in 1712. He was admitted at Lincoln's Inn on 17 January 1706 and was called to the bar in 1716. He married his cousin Jane Wyndham daughter of William Wyndham of Dunraven Castle Glamorgan. She died in 1723 and he was left with considerable estates in Gloucestershire and Glamorgan. In 1727, he built Clearwell Court to the designs of Roger Morris, and replaced an older house which occupied the same site. He made a second marriage to Anne Edwin, daughter of Samuel Edwin of Llanmihangel Plâs, Glamorgan.

In 1716, Wyndham was appointed secretary to the chancellor of Duchy of Lancaster, a post which he held for the rest of his life and was also appointed auditor to south part of the Duchy of Lancaster which he held until 1731. He was returned as Member of Parliament for Truro at a by-election on 17 March 1721 and was returned again at the 1722 general election In his first Parliament he supported the Government, seconding a motion to examine one of the Atterbury conspirators in the Tower in 1723, and seconding the Address in 1726, when he was described as a ‘favourite of Walpole's’. He was appointed recorder of Gloucester in 1727 and at the 1727 general election, switched seats to Dunwich which was probably with the support of Walpole. However, when Walpole did not make him a Lord of the Admiralty, he went into opposition and spoke against the Government in the civil list arrears debate on 24 April 1729.

Walpole is said to have offered him a commissionership of customs to get him out of the House of Commons but when he found it was in Scotland he refused to accept. Thereafter he voted against the Government in all recorded occasions and became a frequent opposition speaker. He served on an inquiry into the frauds in the Charitable Corporation, carrying a motion for committing Sir Archibald Grant into the custody of the serjeant at arms. In 1733 he supported a motion that Sir Robert Sutton was guilty of fraud and breach of trust. He also spoke on bills concerning molasses, the qualification of Members, the sinking fund, and the excise. In the last session he spoke against the army and for a place bill. He did not stand again in 1734. He was ‘known for his blunt humour’ but Horace Walpole wrote that he always spoke with esteem of Sir Robert Walpole.

For the rest of his life Wyndham looked after his estates.. These were augmented when he succeeded his brother to the family estate in Cromer in 1745. He died on 12 December 1752. He had two sons by his first wife, and three sons by his second wife. His eldest son by his second wife, Charles, became MP for Glamorgan.

Parliament of Great Britain
Preceded by John Selwyn; Spencer Cowper	Member of Parliament for Truro –1727; With: Spencer Cowper	Succeeded by Hugh Boscawen; Sidney Meadows
Preceded by Sir George Downing, Bt; John Sambrooke	Member of Parliament for Dunwich; 1727–1734; With: Sir George Downing, Bt	Succeeded by Sir George Downing, Bt; Sir Orlando Bridgeman, Bt
