= Clearwell Castle =

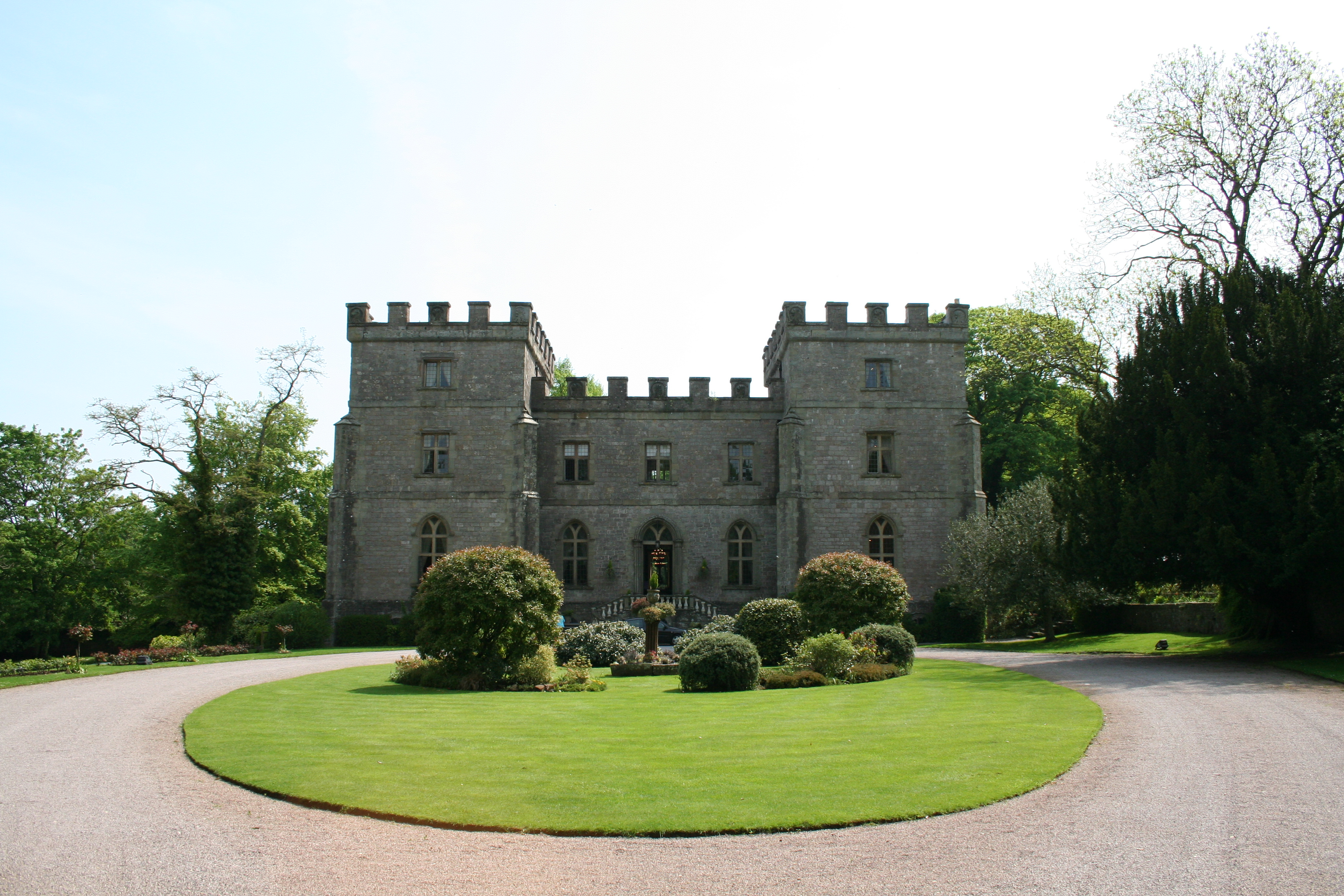
- "a Gothick Revival castle, the earliest in England"

- Location within Gloucestershire
- 51.7667°N 2.6243°W
- Type: House
- Location: Clearwell, Gloucestershire, England

History
- Built: 1727-1728

Site notes
- Architect: Roger Morris
- Architectural style: Gothic Revival
- Governing body: Privately owned

Listed Building – Grade II*
- Official name: Clearwell Castle
- Designated: 24 September 1984
- Reference no.: 1186324

Listed Building – Grade II
- Official name: Clearwell Castle main gateway and flanking lodges
- Designated: 24 September 1984
- Reference no.: 1299253

Listed Building – Grade II
- Official name: Clearwell Castle gatehouse and flanking stables
- Designated: 24 September 1984
- Reference no.: 1299254

Listed Building – Grade II
- Official name: Clearwell Castle statue of a man about 30M west of main front on right, facing house
- Designated: 24 September 1984
- Reference no.: 1186327

Listed Building – Grade II
- Official name: Clearwell Castle statue of child and sphinx, about 30M west of main front on left, facing house
- Designated: 24 September 1984
- Reference no.: 1186326

Clearwell Castle in Clearwell, the Forest of Dean, Gloucestershire, is a Gothic Revival house constructed from 1727. Built by Thomas Wyndham to the designs of Roger Morris, it is the earliest Georgian Gothic Revival castle in England predating better-known examples such as Strawberry Hill House by over twenty years. A home of the Wyndham family for some 150 years, the first half of the twentieth century saw a disastrous fire, and subsequent asset-stripping, which brought the castle close to ruination. Slowly restored from 1954, in the 1970s the castle housed a recording studio used by, among other major bands, Black Sabbath, Led Zeppelin, Deep Purple, Bad Company, Queen and Sweet. Now operating as a wedding venue, the castle is a Grade II* listed building.

== History ==
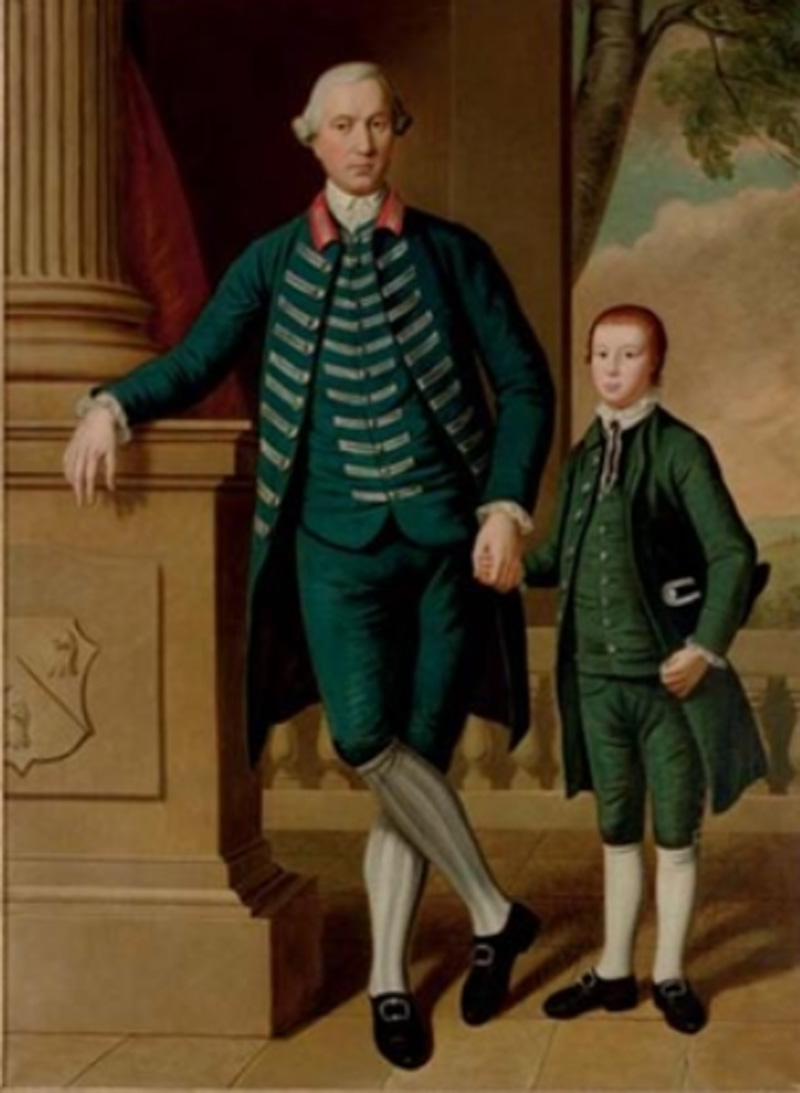
Charles Wyndham (later Edwin) and his son Thomas Wyndham in 1775

Thomas Wyndham (1686–1752), the son of Francis Wyndham, a wealthy landowner, and Sarah Darell, was educated at Eton and the University of Cambridge, and became a barrister and later a Member of Parliament. He married twice; firstly to his cousin Jane Wyndham, daughter and heir of William Wyndham of Dunraven Castle in South Wales, secondly to Anne Edwin, daughter of Samuel Edwin of Llanmihangel Place, Glamorgan. Both marriages brought Wyndham considerable wealth. In 1727, he began the construction of a new house, then titled Clearwell Court, on the site of an earlier house. Alistair Rowan suggests that construction was undertaken in two phases, the main frontage in the first building period of 1727–1728, and the rear of the house, with the library on the ground floor and bedrooms above, after his second marriage in the 1730s.

After Wyndham's death in 1752, the court was inherited by the eldest son of his second marriage, Charles Wyndham (1731–1801). In 1762 Charles married Eleanor Rooke. The couple had one son, Thomas Wyndham (1763–1814). In about 1775 Charles had his portrait painted with his son Thomas who was then about 12 years old. At about the same time he commissioned an etching of Clearwell Court which shows both the house and the stable. Charles died in 1801 and his son Thomas inherited the court. In 1787 he had married Anna Ashby. Of their two children, only the daughter, Caroline, (1789–1870), survived to adulthood. In 1810 Caroline married Windham Henry Quin (1782–1850). On the deaths of their fathers, in 1814 and 1824 respectively, they inherited considerable estates in Gloucestershire, Norfolk and South Wales, with Quin also succeeding to the Earldom of Dunraven and Mount-Earl. After her husband's death in 1850, Caroline, then the Dowager Countess, remained at Clearwell until her own death in 1870. In 1890, the Clearwell estate passed out of the ownership of the Wyndham family.

The court was renamed Clearwell Castle in 1908. The first half of the 20th century saw the castle suffer a serious fire in 1930, and after the Second World War, the loss of its floors, roofs and many of its internal fittings and decorations prior to intended demolition. (Note: David Verey, in the first edition of his Gloucestershire Pevsner writes that, "between 1948 and 1954 the interior was largely ruined by speculators".) The castle was saved through its purchase in 1952 by Frank Yeates, son of a former gardener at the castle. Yeates and his family began a long restoration.

In the 1970s the family ran a recording and rehearsal studios at Clearwell. Many major rock bands including Led Zeppelin, Deep Purple, Mott the Hoople, Black Sabbath, Bad Company, Queen and Whitesnake recorded at the castle. Black Sabbath started writing and recording their album Sabbath Bloody Sabbath when staying at the castle in 1973, and band member Tony Iommi claimed to have "definitely" seen a ghost in the building. In 1978, the members of Led Zeppelin reconvened at the castle after a period apart, and began writing and rehearsing what became their In Through the Out Door album.

The Yeates family sold the castle in the 1980s. In 1994 it was bought by Richard Morley, a computer consultant, who ran it as a commune. The castle was subsequently bought by Harry Bramer and is run as a wedding venue.

== Architecture and description ==
Alistair Rowan, in his 1970 essay on the castle, describes Clearwell as "next to Vanbrugh Castle, the oldest Georgian Gothic castle standing". (Note: Alistair Rowan's essay appeared in a volume of articles, The Country Seat - Studies in the History of the British Country House, which was produced as a sixty-fifth birthday tribute to the architectural historian Sir John Summerson. In the essay, Rowan notes that Vanbrugh Castle lacks the Gothic arches employed at Clearwell.) Alan Brooks, in the revised 2002 Gloucestershire Pevsner, goes further, calling Clearwell, "the earliest Gothick Revival castle in England". Neither Rowan, nor David Verey in the first edition of the Gloucestershire Pevsner, attributed the castle to a named architect, but both Brooks, and Historic England, firmly ascribe the castle to Roger Morris. Brooks suggests that Clearwell goes further in conveying the "castle air" than much of Vanbrugh's work, although he notes similarities to Vanbrugh's reconstruction at Lumley Castle in County Durham, and to Morris's own work at Inveraray Castle in Argyll, though the latter is almost twenty years after Clearwell in date.

The castle comprises a recessed two-storey central block, with paired, three-storey towers to the front and a rear extension at a right angle to the main block. Rowan suggests these two sections represent separate building phases, of 1727–1728, and the mid-1730s. The whole is built of local stone from the Forest of Dean. Little of the original interior has survived; Victorian remodelling in the mid-19th century and the fire and subsequent gutting of the building in the mid-20th, destroyed most of the decoration. The castle is a Grade II* listed building. The main gateway and lodges, the stable lodges, three pairs of gateposts on a green facing the main entrance, and statues of a man, and a child with a sphinx, on the lawn in front of the castle, all have their own Grade II listings. The statue of the man probably depicts Hercules, while the meaning of the statue of the child atop a sphinx is unrecorded. (Note: Cupid's victory over the Sphinx is the narrative of Ben Jonson's 17th-century masque Love Freed from Ignorance and Folly. In the 18th century, the date of the Clearwell statue, the imagery was favoured by sculptors; examples can be seen at Versailles and Sanssouci.)

== Sources ==
- Craig, Jennifer J. (2010). "New Riddles From The Sphinx: A Dialogue Of Emblems In Ben Johnson's Masque Love Freed From Ignorance And Folly (1611)". In Simon McKeown (ed.). The International Emblem: From Incunabula to the Internet - Selected Proceedings of the Eighth International Conference of the Society for Emblem Studies. Newcastle, UK: Cambridge Scholars Publishing. ISBN 9781443820066.
- Rowan, Alistair (1970). "Clearwell Castle, Gloucestershire". In Howard Colvin; John Harris (eds.). The Country Seat: Studies in the History of the British Country House. London: Allen Lane. OCLC 911316520.
- Verey, David (1970). Gloucestershire: The Vale and the Forest of Dean. The Buildings of England. Harmondsworth, UK: Penguin Books. OCLC 920907847.
- Verey, David; Brooks, Alan (2002) [1970]. Gloucestershire 2: The Vale and the Forest of Dean. The Buildings of England. New Haven, US and London: Yale University Press. ISBN 9780300097337.
