= Still of the Night (song) =

Single by Whitesnake

from the album Whitesnake
- B-side: "Here I Go Again" (UK) "Don't Turn Away" (US)
- Released: 2 March 1987
- Studio: Little Mountain (Vancouver); Phase One (Toronto) Compass Point (Nassau); Cherokee (Hollywood); One on One (North Hollywood); Goodnight L.A. (Los Angeles)
- Genre: Glam metal; heavy metal
- Length: 6:41 (album version); 3:58 (single version)
- Label: EMI
- Songwriters: David Coverdale; John Sykes
- Producers: Mike Stone; Keith Olsen

Whitesnake singles chronology
"Slow an' Easy" (1984)	"Still of the Night" (1987)	"Here I Go Again 87" (1987)

Music video
- "Still of the Night" on YouTube

"Still of the Night" is a song by British-American rock band Whitesnake from their self-titled seventh studio album. It was released on 2 March 1987, by EMI Records and Geffen Records as the album's lead single. The single peaked at number sixteen on the UK Singles Chart, number seventy-nine on the US Billboard Hot 100 and number eighteen on the Mainstream Rock chart. The song, described as the group's epitome of the hair metal era, is known for its heavy riffs and dynamic structure. "Still of the Night" has since become one of the band's signature songs.

In 2003, Martin Popoff listed the song as 58th in The Top 500 Heavy Metal Songs of All Time. In 2008, Guitar World considered it as "the best song that Led Zeppelin never wrote". In 2009, the track was named the 27th best hard rock song of all time by VH1.

== Background ==
The song was written by lead singer David Coverdale and guitarist John Sykes, and proved to be one of the band's most popular songs. Both the current Whitesnake lineup and John Sykes play the song as their live encore.

In 2009, in an interview with Metal Hammer, Coverdale commented on the origins of the song:

"When my mother died I was going through the stuff at her house and found some early demo cassettes. One of them was a song that Ritchie Blackmore and I had been working on which was the basic premise of what would become "Still of the Night". It was totally unrecognizable, so Ritchie doesn't have anything to worry about... neither do I! Ha ha ha! I took it as far as I could then I gave it to Sykes when we were in the south of France, and he put the big guitar hero stuff on there. John hated blues so I had to work within those parameters. I manipulated it to be electric blues, but how he performed it was fabulous for his time and relatively unique because of the songs. There were a lot of people doing that widdly stuff but they didn't have the quality of those songs."

== Music video ==
"Still of the Night"

The director of the music video was Marty Callner. Initially, the female role of the "Whitesnake woman" was planned for the pre-fame Claudia Schiffer, but the plan fell apart the night before the shoot. As such, Callner called Coverdale to discuss changes on the storyboards, but seeing the attractiveness of Coverdale's future wife Tawny Kitaen, she was chosen to play the role. Part of the video's set design was Coverdale's idea inspired by Elvis Presley's movie Jailhouse Rock, but "it's like much more idealized prison cells, but this was done with a big full moon. And the band was fantastic – they sold the song brilliantly". The band in the music video is not the same as on the recording. Of the original band that recorded the song, only vocalist David Coverdale appears. Studio bassist Neil Murray was replaced with Rudy Sarzo in the video, drummer Aynsley Dunbar was replaced by Tommy Aldridge, and guitarist John Sykes was replaced by Adrian Vandenberg and Vivian Campbell.

== Comparison to Led Zeppelin ==
The song sparked comparison with Led Zeppelin. Some have claimed Coverdale copied Led Zeppelin's "Black Dog" and "Whole Lotta Love". David Coverdale has denied this, stating that the song structure and the main riff were inspired by "Jailhouse Rock" and Jeff Beck's "Rice Pudding", respectively. In 1987, responding to the claims, Coverdale jokingly stated "I guess it's quite a compliment to be placed in a class like that."

== Track listing ==
1. "Still of the Night" – 6:38
2. "Here I Go Again" – 4:33
3. "You're Gonna Break My Heart Again" – 4:11

== Personnel ==
- David Coverdale – vocals
- John Sykes – guitar, bowed guitar
- Neil Murray – bass guitar
- Aynsley Dunbar – drums
- Don Airey – keyboards

== Charts ==
Chart (1987)	Peak position
UK Singles (The Official Charts Company)	16
Ireland (IRMA)	23
US Billboard Hot 100	79
US Billboard Albums Rock Tracks	18

== Release history ==
Release formats for Still of the Night
Region	Date	Label	Format	Ref.
UK	2 March 1987	EMI	7-inch vinyl; 7-inch white vinyl; 12-inch maxi single; Picture disc	
Various	9 March 1987	EMI	7-inch vinyl; 7-inch white vinyl; 12-inch maxi single; Picture disc	
North America	9 March 1987	Geffen	7-inch vinyl; 12-inch vinyl; CD	
