= Give Me All Your Love =

1988 single by Whitesnake

Single by Whitesnake

from the album Whitesnake
- B-side: "Fool for Your Loving" (UK) "Straight for The Heart" (US)
- Released: 4 January 1988 (UK)
- Recorded: 1987
- Genre: Glam metal; heavy metal
- Length: 3:26; 3:11 (88 remix)
- Label: Geffen, EMI
- Songwriters: David Coverdale, John Sykes
- Producers: Mike Stone, Keith Olsen

Whitesnake singles chronology
"Is This Love" (1987)	"Give Me All Your Love" (1988)	"Crying in the Rain '87" (1988)

Music video
- "Give Me All Your Love" on YouTube

"Give Me All Your Love" is a song by the British-American rock band Whitesnake. The song is taken from the group's 1987 multi-platinum self-titled album. Being the fourth single released from the album, the track reached number 48 on the US Top 100 charts, number 22 on the Mainstream Rock Charts, number 18 in the UK charts, and 49 in New Zealand.

== Details ==
The single was originally written by singer David Coverdale and guitarist John Sykes, and has been a mainstay in Whitesnake's set-list even to this day, long after Sykes' departure from the band.

A music video was also made for the song, and it had the lowest budget out of all the music videos for 1987's Whitesnake. The music video starts with the band flying to the venue and arriving backstage. The rest of the video features the band performing the song on a concert stage at Meadowlands Arena in East Rutherford, New Jersey during their 1987 US tour. The music video differs greatly from the others for Whitesnake, as it doesn't feature David Coverdale's then-girlfriend Tawny Kitaen.

The song's 1988 single release featured a new guitar solo which had been recorded by the band's newest member, Vivian Campbell, known as "Give Me All Your Love ('88 Mix)" (this is the version that is heard in the music video). Campbell later said, "That’s the only thing I recorded with Whitesnake. We went in and mixed that track. I did a guitar solo on it."

== Reception ==
Critic Gavin Edwards said, "the music starts, and I wish it hadn’t. "Give Me All Your Love" is a big slice of generic uptempo rock pomp. For too many reasons to detail, I'd rather be writing about the chart-topping "Here I Go Again"."

Cash Box called it "a curt, metallic, rave-out that shows what this band is really about."

Remixed for 2021's The Blues Album, it was said it had, "a refreshing tweak which pulls John Sykes guitar riffery to the fore with wonderful clarity."

== Track list ==
1. "Give Me All Your Love" - 3:30
2. "Fool for Your Loving" - 4:14 (Vinyl LP/CD)
3. "Don't Break My Heart Again" - 3:46 (CD)
4. "Here I Go Again (USA Single Remix)" - 3:53 (CD)

== Personnel ==
- David Coverdale – lead vocals
- John Sykes – guitars, backing vocals
- Neil Murray – bass
- Aynsley Dunbar – drums, percussion

Special guests

- Don Airey – keyboards
- Bill Cuomo – keyboards
- Vivian Campbell - guitar solo on '88 Mix

== Charts ==
Year	Chart	Position
1988	Billboard Mainstream Rock	22
1988	Billboard Hot 100	48
1988	UK Singles Chart	18
1988	New Zealand	49
1988	Ireland	10
