= Charles Edwin (died 1801) =

Welsh politician

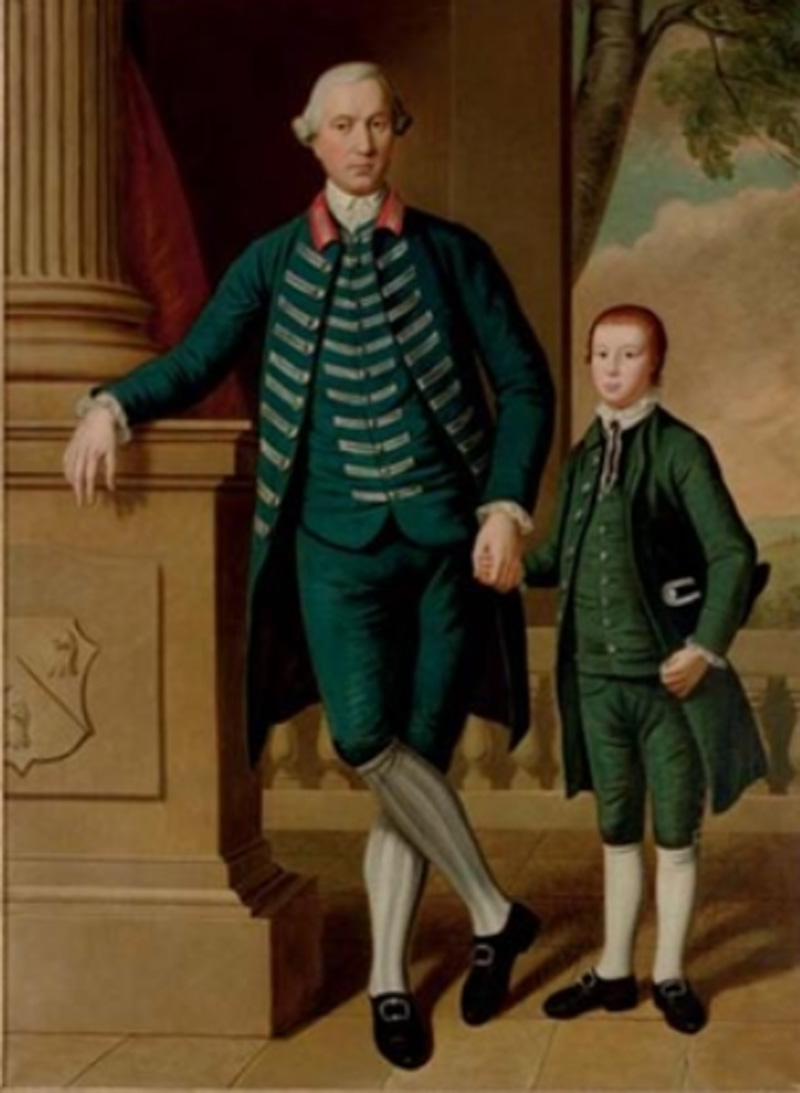
Portrait of Charles Edwin Wyndham with his son Thomas Wyndham

Charles Edwin (born Wyndham; died 1801) was a Welsh politician.

He was the oldest son of Thomas Wyndham of Cromer, Norfolk. His mother, Anne, was the daughter of Samuel Edwin MP, and the sister of Charles Edwin MP.

Charles Wyndham married twice; first in 1762 to Eleanor, daughter of Major James Rooke, and secondly to Charlotte, daughter of Robert Jones of Fonmon Castle. When he inherited his uncle's estates in 1776, he took the name Edwin.

At the 1780 general election he was elected unopposed as the member of parliament (MP) for Glamorgan. He held the seat until 1789, when he stood down in favour of his son Thomas Wyndham.

Parliament of Great Britain
Preceded by George Venables-Vernon	Member of Parliament for Glamorgan; 1780–1789	Succeeded by Thomas Wyndham
