= Thomas Wyndham (of Dunraven Castle) =

British politician

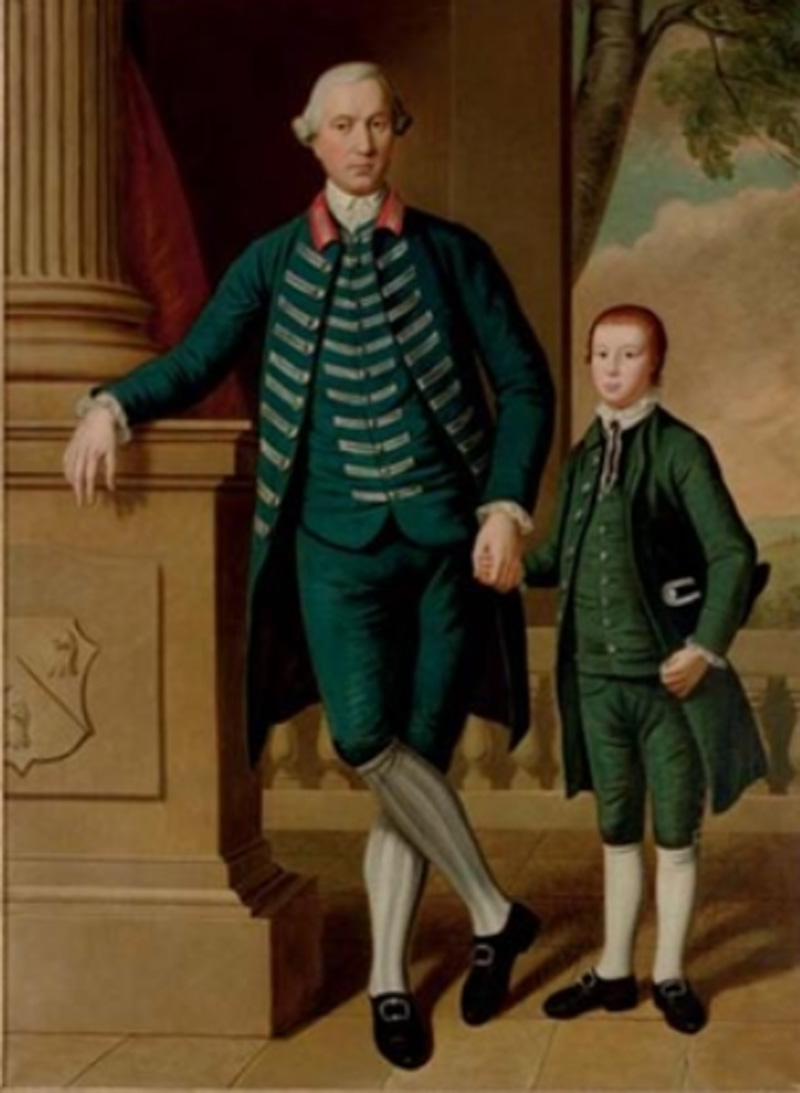

Thomas Wyndham (c. 1763 – 28 November 1814), was a Welsh politician.

He was the oldest son of Charles Edwin (formerly Wyndham) MP, and of Llanmihangel Plas and Dunraven Castle. His mother was Eleanor, the daughter of James Rooke, an MP for Monmouthshire. He was educated at Eton and at Wadham College, Oxford.

He was elected in 1789 as the Member of Parliament (MP) for Glamorgan, and held the seat until his death in 1814.

In 1810 his daughter Caroline married Hon. Windham Quin, who succeeded in 1824 as the 2nd Earl of Dunraven and Mount-Earl.

Parliament of Great Britain
Preceded by Charles Edwin	Member of Parliament for Glamorgan; 1789 – 1800	Succeeded by Parliament of the United Kingdom
Parliament of the United Kingdom
Preceded by Parliament of Great Britain	Member of Parliament for Glamorgan; 1801 – 1814	Succeeded by Benjamin Hall
