= Is This Love (Whitesnake song) =

- Artwork for UK and European releases

Single by Whitesnake

from the album Whitesnake
- B-side: "Standing in the Shadow '87" (UK) "Bad Boys" (US)
- Released: 18 May 1987
- Genre: Glam metal; soft rock
- Length: 4:48
- Label: Geffen; EMI
- Songwriters: David Coverdale; John Sykes
- Producers: Mike Stone (for Mike Stone Enterprises); Keith Olsen (for Pogologo Productions)

Whitesnake singles chronology
"Here I Go Again 87" (1987)	"Is This Love" (1987)	"Give Me All Your Love" (1988)

Music video
- "Is This Love" on YouTube

"Is This Love" is a song by the British-American rock band Whitesnake, released on 18 May 1987 in the UK as the second single from their self-titled album.

The single was a hit for Whitesnake, reaching number nine in the UK Singles Chart, and number two on the US Billboard Hot 100 singles chart, making it their second-biggest US hit after "Here I Go Again", which topped the chart. The single was reissued in 1994 to promote Whitesnake's Greatest Hits. This version reached number 25 on the UK Singles Chart.

"Is This Love" has been a mainstay in Whitesnake's live shows since 1987. As such, it is featured on several of their live albums, including Live: In the Shadow of the Blues (2006) and Live at Donington 1990 (2011). John Sykes played it live in 2004 (Bad Boy Live!). In 2015, Classic Rock magazine ranked it as 7th on their Top 40 greatest power ballads list.

== Background and writing ==
The power ballad was written by vocalist David Coverdale and guitarist John Sykes during the album's early writing process (which took place in the south of France), but it was long rumoured that the song had originally been written for Tina Turner. Coverdale confirmed these rumours in the booklet of Whitesnake's 20th anniversary edition, saying:

Before I'd left [for the south of France] a friend at EMI had asked me for any ideas that would work for Tina Turner. So that was where the original idea for "Is This Love" came from.

According to Coverdale, when David Geffen heard the original demo, Coverdale was told to keep the song for Whitesnake.

== Music video ==
A music video was also made, featuring Coverdale's then-girlfriend actress Tawny Kitaen. The music video, which was directed by Marty Callner, depicts the band playing the song on a misty stage, intercut with scenes of Coverdale singing, Kitaen dancing and the two of them together.

Due to Coverdale firing the other members of the band before the album was released, he is the only Whitesnake member present on both the recording and in the music video; this was the case for all music videos released for songs from the 1987 album (except for "Here I Go Again", Vandenberg performed the guitar solo on the recording and later appeared in the music video as well). It achieved heavy rotation on MTV.

== Commercial performance ==
"Is This Love" reached number 13 on Billboard's Mainstream Rock chart. It also peaked at number 38 on the Adult Contemporary chart in the US.

== Track listings ==
All songs were written by David Coverdale and John Sykes, except where noted.

UK (EMI) single

1. "Is This Love" – 4:48
2. "Standing in the Shadow" – 3:53 (Coverdale)*
3. "Need Your Love So Bad" – 3:21 (Little Willie John)*

US (Geffen) single

1. "Is This Love" – 4:48
2. "Bad Boys" – 4:09

*The B-sides that appeared on EMI editions of the single were new 1987 re-recordings of earlier tracks by the band, although they were not advertised as such on the packaging. Both re-recorded versions would later feature on the 1987 Versions EP.

== Personnel ==
- David Coverdale – lead vocals
- John Sykes – guitar, backing vocals
- Neil Murray – bass guitar
- Aynsley Dunbar – drums
- Don Airey – keyboards

== Charts ==
=== Weekly charts ===
Weekly chart performance for "Is This Love"
Chart (1987–1988)	Peak position
Australia (Kent Music Report)	12
Canada Top Singles (RPM)	11
Europe (European Hot 100 Singles)	46
Ireland (IRMA)	21
Netherlands (Dutch Top 40)	23
Netherlands (Single Top 100)	31
UK Singles (Official Charts)	9
US Billboard Hot 100	2
US Adult Contemporary (Billboard)	38
US Mainstream Rock (Billboard)	13
US Cash Box Top 100	2

Chart (1994)	Peak position
UK Singles (Official Charts)	25
UK Rock & Metal Singles Chart	29

Chart (2013)	Peak position
UK Rock & Metal Singles Chart	16

=== Year-end charts ===
1987 year-end chart performance for "Is This Love"
Chart (1987)	Position
UK Singles (OCC)	98

1988 year-end chart performance for "Is This Love"
Chart (1988)	Position
US Billboard Hot 100	17

== Certifications ==
Certifications and sales for "Is This Love"
Region	Certification	Certified units/sales
New Zealand (RMNZ)	Gold	15,000^{‡}
Spain (Promusicae)	Gold	30,000^{‡}
United Kingdom (BPI)	Silver	250,000
United Kingdom (BPI) 2006 release	Silver	200,000^{‡}
^{‡} Sales+streaming figures based on certification alone.

== Release history ==
Release formats for Is This Love
Region	Date	Label	Format	Ref.
UK	18 May 1987	EMI	7-inch vinyl; 12-inch vinyl; CD	
Germany	25 May 1987	EMI	7-inch vinyl; 12-inch vinyl; CD	
North America	October 1987	Geffen	7-inch vinyl; 12-inch vinyl; Cassette	
Japan	21 November 1987	CBS/Sony	7-inch vinyl	
UK	20 June 1994	EMI	7-inch vinyl; Cassette; CD	
