= Crying in the Rain (Whitesnake song) =

1982 song by Whitesnake

Song by Whitesnake

from the album Saints & Sinners
- Released: 1982
- Recorded: 1981–1982
- Length: 5:59
- Label: Sunburst
- Songwriter: David Coverdale
- Producer: Martin Birch

Music video
- "Crying in the Rain" on YouTube

"Crying in the Rain"

Promotional single by Whitesnake

from the album Whitesnake
- Released: 1988 (promo CD)
- Recorded: 1986
- Genre: Glam metal; blues
- Length: 5:37
- Label: EMI (UK); Geffen (US)
- Songwriter: David Coverdale
- Producers: Mike Stone, Keith Olsen

Whitesnake singles chronology
"Give Me All Your Love" (1988)	"Crying in the Rain" (1988)	"Fool for Your Loving" (1989)

Music video
- "Crying in the Rain (1987 Version)" on YouTube

"Crying in the Rain" is a song by the British hard rock band Whitesnake. The song was originally released on the group's 1982 album Saints & Sinners, but was re-recorded on the group's 1987 multi-platinum album Whitesnake. The song was inspired by singer David Coverdale's divorce.

== Overview ==
The original version of "Crying in the Rain" is very blues-based and features a short guitar solo at the beginning played by Bernie Marsden. The original song also has a bit slower tempo compared to the re-recorded version, which had a much heavier and faster sound, influenced by heavy metal. The guitar solo at the beginning of the original was also removed from this version. David Coverdale has stated in interviews that "John (Sykes) hated blues".

The re-recorded version (sometimes titled "Crying in the Rain '87") was also released as a one-track promo single.

The song has been a part of Whitesnake's live performances since its release in 1982, although it is the 1987 version that Whitesnake has kept performing, since 1987. Also, since Whitesnake's reformation in 2002, the song has been extended by a drum solo in the middle of the song.

== Reception ==
Kerrang! described the original version as "an epic knee-trembler launched on some exquisite slide guitar from Micky Moody."

== Personnel ==
=== Original version ===
- David Coverdale – lead vocals
- Micky Moody - guitars, backing vocals
- Bernie Marsden – guitars
- Jon Lord - keyboards
- Neil Murray – bass
- Ian Paice – drums
- Mel Galley – backing vocals

=== Re-recorded version ===
- David Coverdale – lead vocals
- John Sykes – guitars, backing vocals
- Neil Murray – bass
- Aynsley Dunbar – drums, percussion
- Don Airey – keyboards
- Bill Cuomo – keyboards
