= The Top 500 Heavy Metal Songs of All Time =

Book by Martin Popoff

The Top 500 Heavy Metal Songs of All Time is a book by Martin Popoff who is the editor in chief and writer of the Brave Words & Bloody Knuckles magazine as well as the senior editor of bravewords.com. He also wrote The Top 500 Heavy Metal Albums of All Time (2010).

Popoff put together this book by requesting thousands of heavy metal fans, musicians, and journalists to send in their favorite metal songs. Almost 18,000 individual votes were tallied and entered into a database from which the final rankings were derived.

Martin Popoff then began interviewing the bands that made the final grade, reviewing each track and digging into the history of each song that made the final list.

Additionally, some of the top metal performers were polled and their lists displayed in the book. It also contains hundreds of quotes from dozens of well-known artists as well as several underground bands and artists who have left a mark on the metal scene.

== The list ==
The book designates the following songs as the best of all time:

1. Paranoid by Black Sabbath
2. Master of Puppets by Metallica
3. Ace of Spades by Motörhead
4. Crazy Train by Ozzy Osbourne
5. Angel of Death by Slayer
6. The Number of the Beast by Iron Maiden
