= Artisan Sound Recorders =

Disk mastering

Artisan Sound Recorders was one of Southern California's premier disk mastering facilities. It was founded by Robert M. MacLeod Jr. in the 1960s, and acquired by Kent Duncan in 1979 when MacLeod retired. In the early 1990s, it was sold to Jon Lowry.

More than 500 gold and platinum recordings were recorded and or mastered at Artisan, including hit records by Bone Thugs Eminem, and John B. Artisan's engineering staff included Bob MacLeod, John Golden, Kevin Gray, Jo Hansch, Jon Lowry, and Aaron Connor.
