= Martin Popoff =

Canadian music journalist (born 1963)

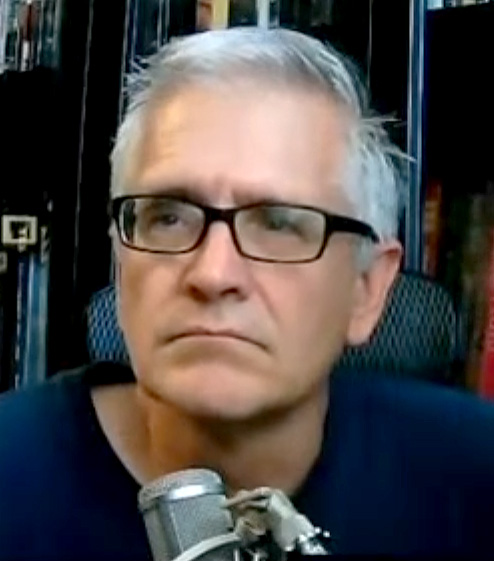
- Popoff in 2022
- Born: April 28, 1963 (age 63); Castlegar, British Columbia
- Education: University of Victoria; McMaster University
- Occupation: Music journalist

Martin Popoff (born April 28, 1963) is a Canadian music journalist, critic and author. He is mainly known for writing about heavy metal music. The senior editor and co-founder of Brave Words & Bloody Knuckles, he has written more than twenty books that both critically evaluate heavy metal and document its history. He has been called "heavy metal's most widely recognized journalist" by his publisher.

== Career ==
Born in Castlegar, British Columbia, Popoff's interest in heavy metal began as a youth in Trail, British Columbia, in the early 1970s, when bands such as Led Zeppelin and Iron Butterfly were in the collections of the older brothers and cousins of Popoff and his friends. Black Sabbath played even heavier music, and became the group his circle of friends thought of as "our band, not the domain of our elders". Other heavy rock albums of the era, such as Nazareth's Razamanaz and Kiss's Hotter than Hell, further shaped his emerging musical tastes. Angel City and April Wine were among Popoff's favourite bands as a teenager.

Of popular music magazines around at the time, Popoff recalls being a regular reader of Circus, Hit Parader, and later, "Kerrang! blew our minds." He does not identify any specific writers as being particularly influential on his own writing style, saying "it never registered who wrote what."

Popoff received a BA degree in English from the University of Victoria in 1984 and an MBA in marketing at McMaster University in 1987, working for Xerox before co-owning a print brokering company. For a while in the 1980s, he also played drums in a bar band called Torque.

In 1993, he released his first book, the independently published Riff Kills Man!: 25 Years of Recorded Hard Rock and Heavy Metal, a collection of 1,942 critical reviews of heavy metal records. Shortly after its publication, he co-founded Brave Words & Bloody Knuckles, which released its first issue in 1994. He soon returned to his reviews book, releasing a revised and expanded version in 1997 titled The Collector's Guide to Heavy Metal, which almost doubled the original book's number of reviews to 3,650. In the book, he identifies three major stages in the early development of heavy metal. The first stage, "invention", took place in 1970 with the release of Deep Purple in Rock coinciding with debut albums from Black Sabbath and Uriah Heep. Stage two, "re-invention", occurred in 1976 with Judas Priest's Sad Wings of Destiny. The third stage, "re-intensification", happened in 1984 with the release of Metallica's Ride the Lightning. The 1997 Collector's Guide received positive reviews from critics, with Johnny Walker of Addicted to Noise dubbing the book "the definitive guide to hard rock / heavy metal and its many related sub-genres".

In the 2000s, Popoff revised and expanded his Collector's Guide one more time, splitting it up by decade into three separate volumes comprising a total of 6,763 albums spanning three decades of heavy metal. Volume 3: The Nineties was published in 2007. Volume 4: The '00s, published in 2011, was co-written between Popoff and fellow Brave Words & Bloody Knuckles writer David Perri.

Popoff has stated that he considers the greatest record of all time to be Led Zeppelin's 1975 Physical Graffiti, followed by Black Sabbath's Sabotage, released in the same year. He has also named Queen's self-titled 1973 debut as his personal favourite record of all time, and often regards Max Webster as his all-time favourite band. Newer groups that Popoff has spoken highly of include Mastodon, Opeth, Lamb of God and Dark Tranquillity. His Collector's Guide became rather notorious in some circles of rock fans for a particularly scathing review of Def Leppard's worldwide smash hit glam metal album Hysteria (1987), to which he awarded a score of zero out of ten. Popoff continues to defend his opinion of it years later, citing "just awful production, lyrics, singing, clichés of every musical and lyrical sort."

A number of Popoff's other books are biographies of notable metal bands, including Black Sabbath in Doom Let Loose and Dio in Light Beyond the Black (both published in 2006). While the biographies are usually not officially authorized, a large amount of research consists of interviews between Popoff and members of each band. Popoff has said of his relationship with his subjects: "I censor myself because I don't want to write something to hurt people. You write a book on Sabbath and you don't want to write something to hurt (their) families – I love those guys." A Judas Priest biography, Heavy Metal Painkillers, was published in 2007.

In 2014, Popoff stated that he was working on a new book, entitled Who Invented Heavy Metal? In March 2015, Popoff told Metal Shock Finland's chief editor Mohsen Fayyazi that he had finished writing the book and it would be published in approximately a month's time.

Popoff is a reviewer for BangerTV and also appears frequently on the many shows featured on the YouTube channel of music publication Sea of Tranquility.

== Personal life ==
Popoff lives in Toronto, Ontario, Canada.

== Partial bibliography ==
=== Collector's Guide series ===
- 20th Century Rock and Roll: Heavy Metal. Burlington: Collector's Guide Publishing. 2000. ISBN 1-896522-47-5.
- Southern Rock Review. Burlington: Collector's Guide Publishing. 2001. ISBN 1-896522-73-4.
- The Collector's Guide to Heavy Metal – Volume 1: The Seventies. Burlington: Collector's Guide Publishing. 2003. ISBN 1-894959-02-7.
- The Collector's Guide to Heavy Metal – Volume 2: The Eighties. Burlington: Collector's Guide Publishing. 2005. ISBN 1-894959-31-0.
- The Collector's Guide to Heavy Metal – Volume 3: The Nineties. Burlington: Collector's Guide Publishing. 2007. ISBN 1-894959-62-0.
- The Collector's Guide to Heavy Metal – Volume 4: The 00s (with David Perri). Burlington: Collector's Guide Publishing. 2011. ISBN 1-926592-20-4.

=== Ye Olde Metal series ===
- Ye Olde Metal: 1968 to 1972. Power Chord Press. 2007. ISBN 0-9697707-2-3.
- Ye Olde Metal: 1973 to 1975. Power Chord Press. 2007. ISBN 0-9697707-3-1.
- Ye Olde Metal: 1976. Power Chord Press. 2008. ISBN 0-9697707-4-X.
- Ye Olde Metal: 1977. Power Chord Press. 2008. ISBN 0-9697707-5-8.
- Ye Olde Metal: 1978. Power Chord Press. 2009. ISBN 0-9697707-6-6.

=== Rock biographies ===
- Contents Under Pressure: 30 Years of Rush at Home and Away. Toronto: ECW Press. 2004. ISBN 1-55022-678-9.
- Blue Öyster Cult: Secrets Revealed!. Los Angeles: Metal Blade Records. 2004. ISBN 0-9752807-0-8.
- UFO: Shoot Out the Lights. Los Angeles: Metal Blade Records. 2005. ISBN 0-9752807-2-4.
- Rainbow: English Castle Magic. Los Angeles: Metal Blade Records. 2005. ISBN B-00-13FZP6-U.
- Dio: Light Beyond the Black. Los Angeles: Metal Blade Records. 2006. ISBN 0-9752807-4-0.
- Black Sabbath: Doom Let Loose – An Illustrated History. Toronto: ECW Press. 2006. ISBN 1-55022-731-9.
- Judas Priest: Heavy Metal Painkillers – An Illustrated History. Toronto: ECW Press. 2007. ISBN 1-55022-784-X.
- Gettin' Tighter: Deep Purple '68–76. Power Chord Press. 2008. ISBN 0-9811057-1-8.
- A Castle Full of Rascals: Deep Purple '83–'09. Power Chord Press. 2009. ISBN 0-9811057-2-6.
- Sail Away: Whitesnake's Fantastic Voyage. Soundcheck Books LLP. 2015. ISBN 978-0-9575-7008-5.
- Time and a Word: The Yes Story. Soundcheck Books. 2016. ISBN 0993212026.
- AC/DC: Album By Album. Crestline Books. 2017 ISBN 978-0-7858-3754-1.
- Rush: Album By Album. Voyageur Press. 2017 ISBN 978-0-7603-5220-5.
- Iron Maiden: Album By Album. Voyageur Press. 2018 ISBN 978-0-7603-6087-3.
- Pink Floyd: Album By Album. Voyageur Press. 2018 ISBN 978-0-7603-8097-0.
- Queen: Album By Album. Voyageur Press. 2018 ISBN 978-0-7603-6283-9.
- Led Zeppelin: All The Albums All The Songs: Expanded Edition. Chartwell Books. 2022 ISBN 978-0-7858-4180-7.
- Bowie At 75. Motorbooks. 2022 ISBN 978-0-7603-7438-2.
- AC/DC At 50. Motorbooks. 2023 ISBN 978-0-7603-7741-3.
- Pink Floyd and The Dark Side Of The Moon. Motorbooks. 2023 ISBN 978-0-7603-7929-5.
- The Who & Quadrophenia. Motorbooks. 2023 ISBN 978-0-7603-7927-1.
- Kiss At 50. Motorbooks. 2023 ISBN 978-0-7603-8182-3.

=== Miscellaneous ===
- Goldmine Heavy Metal Price Guide. Iola: Krause Publications. 2000. ISBN 0-87341-811-5.
- The Top 500 Heavy Metal Songs of All Time. Toronto: ECW Press. 2003. ISBN 1-55022-530-8.
- The Top 500 Heavy Metal Albums of All Time. Toronto: ECW Press. 2004. ISBN 1-55022-600-2.
- The New Wave of Heavy Metal Singles. Scrap Metal Records. 2005. ISBN 0-9762133-0-3.
- Run for Cover: The Art of Derek Riggs. Aardvark Publishing. 2006. ISBN 1-4276-0538-6.
- All Access: The Art and History of the Backstage Pass. Los Angeles: Cleopatra Records. 2009. ISBN 0-9636193-7-3.
- Worlds Away: Voivod and the Art of Michel Langevin. Spider Press. 2009. ISBN 1-4276-3788-1.
