= Neil Murray (British musician) =

Scottish musician (born 1950)

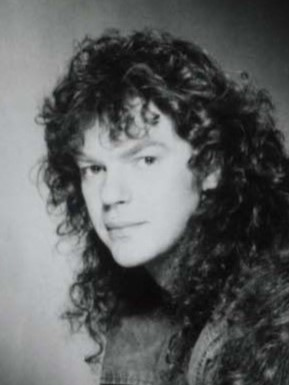
- Murray in 1984

Background information
- Born: Philip Neil Murray; 27 August 1950 (age 76); Edinburgh, Scotland
- Genres: Hard rock; blues rock; heavy metal; jazz fusion
- Instruments: Bass
- Years active: 1967–present
- Formerly of: Colosseum II; Whitesnake; Gary Moore; Gogmagog; Vow Wow; Black Sabbath; Cozy Powell's Hammer; Brian May Band; National Health; Peter Green Splinter Group; Michael Schenker Group; Snakecharmer

Philip Neil Murray (born 27 August 1950) is a Scottish musician, best known as the former bassist of Whitesnake, the Brian May Band, Black Sabbath, and Gary Moore.

== Career ==
=== Early days ===
Originally a drummer who started playing bass in 1967, Murray formed his first band with school friends in 1967 (Slap Happy and the Dum-Dums). His musical tastes were heavily influenced by the mid-1960s 'blues boom' bands and musicians, especially Jeff Beck, Eric Clapton and Jack Bruce, and later by Motown legend James Jamerson and Tim Bogert of Vanilla Fudge, Cactus and Beck, Bogert & Appice. Murray moved to bass shortly before studying graphic design at the London College of Printing.

During 1973, Neil briefly played in Gilgamesh, a jazz-fusion band led by Alan Gowen. After his departure from Gilgamesh, Murray toured the US with Junior Hanson, following a recommendation from Jeff Beck's bass player Clive Chaman. Hanson later became a member of Bob Marley & the Wailers under the name Junior Marvin. Neil spent early 1974 supporting the album he recorded with them, Magic Dragon.

Murray's next gig came again through a recommendation from Clive Chaman, touring with Cozy Powell's Hammer in 1974 and 1975. The line-up included keyboardist Don Airey and guitarist Bernie Marsden.

After Cozy Powell decided to fold Hammer, Murray and Airey joined a revamped version of the British progressive jazz-rock band Colosseum II. The band's leader, drummer Jon Hiseman, had evolved the band's sound in preference for a rockier sound courtesy of Gary Moore's guitar. This line-up of Colosseum II lasted for the first 1976 album Strange New Flesh (a title suggested by Murray, being a snippet of the lyric from their cover of Joni Mitchell's Down To You). Strange New Flesh was a little less intellectual than most of the jazz rock coming out of the UK. It did not have the blackness of bands like Weather Report, but offered more accessible melodies and rock power than the more "intellectual" Canterbury fusion scene presented at the time. Following months of touring Europe and the UK, Murray and vocalist Mike Starrs were fired, due to pressure from the record label Bronze Records, who soon after dropped Colosseum II altogether.

After Colosseum II, in 1976 Neil teamed up again with ex-Gilgamesh keyboardist Alan Gowen in National Health with whom he recorded a self-titled album in 1977. Prior to recording that album, the band played with drummer Bill Bruford of Yes/King Crimson fame, who was followed by ex-Hatfield & the North drummer Pip Pyle. Murray got the chance to work with Bruford again, playing on the rehearsals for Bruford's 1978 Feels Good to Me debut solo album, standing in for Jeff Berlin who was the actual bassist with the band (the LP cover read 'Thanks to Neil Murray: A bass player when I needed one'). Murray also deputised for Berlin on Bruford's Old Grey Whistle Test appearance in 1978. During this performance he sports a long sleeve T-shirt saying 'More Bass', predating Saturday Night Live's "More Cowbell" by more than 20 years.

National Health's complex music and the lack of commercial success prompted Murray to investigate other musical avenues planted in the world of bands like Cream, Jeff Beck or John Mayall & the Bluesbreakers. After playing with Bernie Marsden in Cozy Powell's Hammer, Murray had played on a couple of tracks on Babe Ruth's 1975 album Stealing Home, prior to Marsden joining two members of Deep Purple in Paice Ashton Lord.

=== Whitesnake ===
In late 1977, ex-Deep Purple singer David Coverdale was auditioning drummers for his new band Whitesnake, which featured guitarists Bernie Marsden and Micky Moody. Marsden invited Murray to help out with the process which led to him landing the gig together with drummer Dave Dowle. Deep Purple's Jon Lord joined in the summer of 1978 and, after recording Lovehunter in 1979, Dowle was replaced by Ian Paice (ex-Deep Purple).

From 1978 until late 1986, Murray helped make Whitesnake one of the most popular bands in Europe and Japan, and later America. He recorded with Whitesnake ten albums: Live at Hammersmith (1978), Snakebite (1978), Trouble (1978), Love Hunter (1979), Ready an' Willing (1980), Live...In the Heart of the City (1980), Come an' Get It (1981), Saints & Sinners (1982), Slide It In (1984), and Whitesnake (also referred to as "1987") (1987). Murray's melodic basslines, influenced by Jack Bruce, Andy Fraser and even Jaco Pastorius, stand out from the rock bass-playing of the time.

He did numerous tours in the UK, Europe, Japan and played at Reading Festival in 1979 and 1980 and the Monsters of Rock festival at Castle Donington, England in 1981. However, tours of the US opening for Jethro Tull in 1980 and Judas Priest in 1981 were not enough to match the band's success elsewhere.

In early 1982, after tense Saints & Sinners recording sessions, Coverdale decided on a complete shake-up of the band, management, publishing, and recording contracts. There was a period of uncertainty as to who would be in the 'new' Whitesnake, though Cozy Powell was definitely coming in to replace Ian Paice. Around this time, Murray and Paice had recorded Gary Moore's 1982 Corridors of Power album, and Paice had decided to join Moore. Murray followed suit, and was replaced by Colin Hodgkinson. Coverdale reshuffled the band as Bernie Marsden departed, replaced by Mel Galley, but Jon Lord and Micky Moody returned to the fold after initial uncertainty.

Soon after his departure, Murray briefly formed an outfit called Badlands (not to be confused with the American band featuring Jake E. Lee) behind Uriah Heep's John Sloman on vocals and future Tygers of Pan Tang/Thin Lizzy's John Sykes on guitars. The band recorded some demos, played London's Marquee Club and shopped for a record deal, to no avail. The band's music was hard rock and fitted the gap between a melodic band like Thin Lizzy, a blues influenced outfit like Whitesnake and a more straight-ahead AC/DC.

In 1982, Neil Murray and Ian Paice both joined Gary Moore for a very successful two years. Murray and Paice recorded three albums with Moore: Corridors of Power (1982), Victims of the Future (1983) and Rockin' Every Night – Live in Japan (1983).

The period 1979–1982 also saw Murray participating in a number of solo albums from Graham Bonnet, Jon Lord, Bernie Marsden, Cozy Powell, and Forcefield, sometimes playing with drummer Simon Phillips, which led in 1981 to Murray playing with a trio of superstars – Jeff Beck, Eric Clapton, and Sting – at two of The Secret Policeman's Other Ball series of four concerts at the Theatre Royal, Drury Lane, London. This event was filmed and recorded; Murray is to be heard on "Crossroads" with Beck, Clapton and Phillips even though the album sleeve does not contain any individual credits.

In late 1983, Whitesnake went through another of its many line-ups changes. Colin Hodgkinson and Micky Moody were no longer part of the band. They already had recorded a new album Slide It In (1984). At that time, Coverdale hooked up with A&R guru John Kalodner and signed with Geffen Records. After failed attempts at hiring Mama's Boys' Pat McManus or Adrian Vandenberg, Coverdale welcomed John Sykes (Tygers of Pan Tang, Thin Lizzy) to the band. Sykes brought a lot of fresh ideas, technical ability and an appropriate image to project the band on MTV. Murray was asked back and he and Sykes re-recorded a lot of the guitar and all of the bass parts for Slide It In, resulting in two available vinyl versions: one for Europe featuring Hodgkinson and Moody and a US remix version with Murray and Sykes. The US version was remixed by American Grammy-winning record producer and sound engineer Keith Olsen (The Babys, Pat Benatar, Fleetwood Mac, Foreigner, Grateful Dead, Sammy Hagar, Heart, Journey, Santana) to give it a more radio friendly sound.

1984 was occupied with touring, headlining in the UK and Europe; however, Mel Galley injured his arm, resulting in him having to leave the band and John Sykes taking care of all guitar duties on the road after a couple of months. In April of that following year, Jon Lord left the band for the Deep Purple reunion thus making Whitesnake a four-piece outfit (Coverdale, Murray, Powell, Sykes) with off-stage keyboard player Richard Bailey (ex-Magnum). Support slots in the US with Dio then Quiet Riot (at the height of their brief success) helped to bring Whitesnake to a much wider audience.

The album and tour, culminating with an appearance at the 1985 Rock in Rio Festival in front of 150,000 people, marked the end of an era for the band. Disagreements over financial matters led to Cozy Powell leaving the band for Emerson, Lake & Powell. Aynsley Dunbar (ex-Frank Zappa, Journey, Jefferson Starship) was in place for the recording of what was to be Whitesnake's most successful album.

The making of Whitesnake / 1987 (1987) was fraught with delays, illness and difficulties. Murray's status as an official member of Whitesnake was unclear and although Coverdale had given all members permission to get involved in other projects, there was not enough money to keep Dunbar and Murray on a retainer until the album was completed.

Murray continued doing sessions for several artists (Phenomena amongst others) and recorded with a band project put together by music impresario Jonathan King called Gogmagog, featuring former Iron Maiden members Clive Burr on drums and Paul Di'Anno on vocals, former Ian Gillan/future Iron Maiden guitarist Janick Gers, and ex-Def Leppard guitarist Pete Willis. The band released an EP I Will Be There to general apathy.

Whilst still waiting for things to move in the Whitesnake camp, Murray teamed up with guitarists Mel Galley and Bernie Marsden in the short-lived MGM. The band did some live dates (including the Reading Festival in 1987), but never really took off. A year after recording the backing tracks for Whitesnake / 1987 (1987), with work proceeding at a very slow and expensive pace on the album, Murray took the opportunity to redo some of the bass parts, but disagreements over leadership led to John Sykes quitting the band sixteen months after recording had begun.

In early 1987, Coverdale put together a completely new version of Whitesnake in Los Angeles, and Murray was no longer part of the band. Murray had to hire lawyers to get his financial due from the huge success of Whitesnake / 1987 (1987), the album that went on to sell well over 10 million copies worldwide. To this day, Murray remains the individual who has played on the second most Whitesnake albums, behind only David Coverdale himself.

=== Vow Wow ===
In 1987, Murray joined Japanese hard rock band Vow Wow, who had recently relocated to England, after having worked with its guitarist Kyoji Yamamoto on the second album by Phenomena. He recorded four albums with the band between 1987 and 1989, and toured the UK, Europe, and Japan. He also lived in Tokyo for a few months in 1988. Vocalist Genki Hitomi wanted to remain in Japan, so the group recorded what was supposed to be their last album titled Helter Skelter (1988), which was produced by Tony Taverner, who had previously engineered for Black Sabbath. Murray would later state that he never "really became a permanent member" of Vow Wow in order to keep his options open, partly because he was a member of MGM at the same time.

=== Black Sabbath, Brian May and beyond ===
By 1989, with Geezer Butler's refusal to join the latest Black Sabbath line-up, Murray was asked by Cozy Powell to try out. He joined soon after the release of Headless Cross (1989) and toured with the band in support of the album. Murray stayed with the band until late 1990, recording the Tyr album and once again touring. Live, Murray was able to showcase various bass styles that had not been able to flourish in Whitesnake, ranging from Jack Bruce-type improvising to heavy metal soloing to delicate false harmonics.

When Iommi reformed the Black Sabbath 1981 Mob Rules lineup in 1991 with Appice, Butler and Dio for Dehumanizer, Murray and Cozy Powell started a band project and recorded songs with singer John West (Artension, Royal Hunt). Nothing came out of it until 1998 when those songs resurfaced on a tribute album released after Powell's death in April 1998.

In 1992, Murray played with Black Sabbath's Tony Martin in a new version of Cozy Powell's Hammer that was short lived. Murray had earlier recorded most of Tony Martin's first solo album Back Where I Belong and later played at a series of concerts at Expo' 92 in Seville, Spain backing Brian May, Joe Satriani and Steve Vai. He also reunited with his ex-Whitesnake pals, guitarists Bernie Marsden and Micky Moody, for some dates in the UK with their Moody Marsden Band.

In 1992, Queen's Brian May was ready to go on the road for the first time as a solo artist. Murray and Cozy Powell had done sessions for May's solo album Back to the Light (1992) and they were a natural choice for the touring band. For two years, the band toured the world, notably supporting Guns N' Roses and releasing Live at the Brixton Academy in 1993.

The core of the Brian May Band (Spike Edney, Jamie Moses, Murray and Powell) became the basis of the SAS Band (Spike's All Stars), which continues to this day, playing sporadic live gigs with many famous guest vocalists, including Arthur Brown, Bob Geldof, Chaka Khan, Brian May, Lionel Richie, Paul Rodgers, Roger Taylor and many others. After the first year, Steve Stroud became their main bassist, but Neil returns to play with the band every couple of years.

In late 1994, Murray and Cozy Powell returned to Black Sabbath. They recorded Forbidden (1995) and toured the US & Canada in 1995, although the tour of the UK, Europe and the Far East saw the return of Bobby Rondinelli on drums when Powell departed.

1996 and 1997 saw Murray and Cozy Powell helping to kickstart the return of the legendary Peter Green (John Mayall & the Bluesbreakers, Fleetwood Mac) in his Splinter Group. Murray recorded three albums with Green and toured the UK with occasional European dates.

In 1998, Brian May released his third solo album, Another World, which Murray and Cozy Powell had once again played on, but Powell's death meant a tour with Eric Singer (Badlands, Black Sabbath, Alice Cooper, Lita Ford, Kiss) instead. 1998 also saw the posthumous release of Cozy Powell's Especially for You featuring guitarist Michael Casswell (Brian May Band), keyboardist Lonnie Park (Ten Man Push, John West, Wrathchild America) and vocal phenom John West (Artension, Badlands, Lynch Mob, Royal Hunt, Ten Man Push).

In 1999, Murray started working again with Bernie Marsden and Micky Moody, who had been working with British-Norwegian Whitesnake tribute band the Snakes. When Marsden and Moody eventually parted ways with their Norwegian colleagues, they changed the band name to the Company of Snakes with Don Airey on keyboards and vocalist Robert Hart (Bad Company, Distance, the Jones Gang, solo artist/songwriter) joining them.

After of few years of gigging mainly in the UK and Europe, Robert Hart decided to leave to concentrate on his solo/songwriting career. The only available recording of this line-up (with Don Airey on keys and John Lingwood on drums) is on Micky Moody's solo album I Eat Them for Breakfast (2000). In 2001 Swedish singer Stefan Berggren was recruited and the Company of Snakes released two albums: Here They Go Again (2001, the gig was recorded in Germany and Norway with temporary ex-MSG singer Gary Barden, but his vocals were erased and Stefan Berggren overdubbed) and Burst the Bubble (2002), which featured songs written by most of the band.

Despite success on the touring front, the Company of Snakes called it a day in early 2002, with the band being transformed into M3 Classic Whitesnake, dropping recent original material in favour of a purely Whitesnake set. Ex-Sabbath frontman Tony Martin was their singer initially, before being replaced by Stefan Berggren. The band has released one live album (with Tony Martin on vocals) and one live DVD (with Stefan Berggren and Rainbow/Yngwie Malmsteen/Cornerstone singer Doogie White) featuring songs from the classic Whitesnake era 1978–1982. Murray is also a member of German heavy rock band Empire with whom he has recorded three albums. The band is the brain child of guitarist Rolf Munkes and featured Tony Martin on the Trading Souls (2003) and The Raven Ride (2006) albums.

Since April 2002, Murray has been in the band of the London musical We Will Rock You. He also performed at 2007's 'Classics in Rock' concert in Rotterdam and the first London Rock 'n Roll Fantasy Camp.

=== Michael Schenker Group ===
Murray played on the Michael Schenker Group album In the Midst of Beauty, which was released on 11 May 2008.

== Discography (as a member of bands) ==
Year	Band	Album
2000	Gilgamesh	Arriving Twice (2 tracks recorded in 1973)
1974	Hanson	Magic Dragon
1976	Colosseum II	Strange New Flesh
1978	National Health	National Health
1978	Whitesnake	Snakebite EP
1978	Whitesnake	Trouble
1978	Whitesnake	Live at Hammersmith
1979	Whitesnake	Lovehunter
1980	Whitesnake	Ready an' Willing
1980	Whitesnake	Live...In the Heart of the City
1981	Whitesnake	Come an' Get It
1982	Whitesnake	Saints & Sinners
1982	Badlands	Badlands demo
1982	Gary Moore	Corridors of Power
1983	Gary Moore	Rockin' Every Night – Live in Japan
1984	Whitesnake	Slide It In (US Mix)
1985	Phenomena	Phenomena
1985	Gogmagog	I Will Be There EP
1987	Phenomena	Dream Runner
1987	Whitesnake	Whitesnake / 1987
1987	Vow Wow	V
1987	Vow Wow	Revive EP
1988	Vow Wow	Vibe / Helter Skelter
1988	Mona Lisa Overdrive	Vive La Ka Bum
1990	Black Sabbath	Tyr
1992	The Brian May Band	Back to the Light
1994	The Brian May Band	Live at Brixton Academy
1995	Black Sabbath	Forbidden
1997	Peter Green Splinter Group	Peter Green Splinter Group
1998	Peter Green Splinter Group	The Robert Johnson Songbook
1998	Brian May	Another World
2001	Empire	Hypnotica
2001	The Company of Snakes	Here They Go Again
2002	The Company of Snakes	Burst the Bubble
2002	Rondinelli	Our Cross, Our Sins
2003	Empire	Trading Souls
2003	M3	Classic 'Snake Live Volume 1
2005	M3	Rough An' Ready (CD & DVD)
2006	Empire	The Raven Ride
2007	Empire	Chasing Shadows
2008	Michael Schenker Group	In the Midst of Beauty
2010	Michael Schenker Group	The 30th Anniversary Concert – Live in Tokyo
2013	Snakecharmer	Snakecharmer
2014	Whitesnake	Live in 1984: Back to the Bone
2014	Space Elevator	Space elevator
2017	Snakecharmer	Second Skin
2024	Black Sabbath	Anno Domini 1989–1995

== Discography (session / sideman work) ==
=== Babe Ruth ===
- Kid's Stuff (1976)

=== Bernie Marsden ===
- And About Time Too! (1979)
- Look at Me Now (1981)

=== Graham Bonnet ===
- Line-Up (1981)

=== Cozy Powell ===
- Tilt (1981)
- The Drums Are Back (1992)
- Especially for You (1998)

=== Jon Lord ===
- Before I Forget (1982)

=== Gary Moore ===
- Victims of the Future (1983)

=== Fastway ===
- On Target (1988)

=== Comic Relief ===
- Hale & Pace & the Stonkers – The stonk (charity 7" / 12") (1991)

=== Dave Sharman ===
- Exit Within (1992)

=== Micky Moody ===
- I Eat Them for Breakfast (2000)

=== Queen and Ben Elton ===
- We Will Rock You – The Rock Theatrical (Original Cast) (2002)

=== Queen + Paul Rodgers ===
- The Cosmos Rocks Tour, Cardiff (2008)
- The Cosmos Rocks Tour, Birmingham NIA (2008)

=== Chris Catena's Rock City Tribe ===
- "Truth in Unity"(2020) (Neil features in the song "Motorcycle Killers")

=== The Feckers ===
- "Live To Fight Another Day" (2020)
- "Courage Of Conviction Part III: In The Face Of Adversity" (2028)

=== The Fluffy Jackets ===
- "The Fluffy Jackets featuring special guest Neil Murray" (EP) (2007)
- "Fighting Demons" (2014)
- "Something from Nothing" (CD+DVD) (2019)
- "The Rise And Fall of The Songwriter" (2024)
- "The Comparison Blues" (2026)
- "20 Greatest (2007-2027)" (2027) - three new tracks: "Girl Crush", "One More Teardrop" & "Rock and Roll Time"

== Other appearances ==
- Deep Purple Rock Review 1969–1972 (DVD, 2004, interviewee)
- Inside Black Sabbath (DVD, 2004, interviewee)
- Heavy Metal – Louder Than Life (Feature, 2006, interviewee)
- Celebrating Jon Lord (2014, performer)
- Old Grey Whistle Test, Bruford (television appearance, depping for Jeff Berlin)
- The Fluffy Jackets feat. Manny Charlton - Something from Nothing (DVD, 2019, interviewee)
