= North Star (Curved Air album) =

Studio album by Curved Air
- Released: 17 March 2014
- Studio: Ilkatron Studios
- Genre: Progressive rock, folk rock
- Length: 75:54
- Label: Curved Air
- Producer: Curved Air, Beric Wickens

Curved Air chronology
Airborne (1976)	North Star (2014)

North Star is the seventh studio album by Curved Air and was released on 17 March 2014. It was the first studio album of mostly new material since the band reformed in 2008, following 2008's Reborn (mostly re-recordings of material from their first five albums, with two new tracks), 2010's Retrospective (a "best-of" anthology of original recordings from 1970–1976 plus three tracks by MASK) and 2012's Live Atmosphere (live performances from 2010/11).

== Background and recording ==
Although guitarist Kit Morgan is credited as co-writer of the seven new songs, by the time of recording he had left the band and his place was taken by the returning Kirby Gregory.

Three songs that originally appeared on the first two Curved Air albums were re-recorded, plus one from a Sonja Kristina solo album, and three covers of songs originated by other bands.

== Track listing ==
All tracks written by Harris/Kristina/Morgan/Norton/Pilkington-Miksa/Sax unless otherwise noted

1. "Stay Human" – 3:50
2. "Time Games" – 6:23
3. "Puppets" (Darryl Way, Sonja Kristina) – 5:20
  - first appeared on Second Album
4. "Images and Signs" – 6:44
5. "Interplay" – 5:41
6. "Spider" – 4:39
7. "Magnetism" – 6:32
8. "Colder Than A Rose In Snow" (Paul Travis, Norma Tager) – 4:26
  - first appeared on the 1980 Sonja Kristina album
9. "Spirits in the Material World" (Sting) – 4:58
10. "Old Town News" – 5:08
11. "Situations" (Darryl Way, Rob Martin) – 6:14
  - first appeared on Air Conditioning
12. "Chasing Cars" (Gary Lightbody, Nathan Connolly, Jonny Quinn, Tom Simpson, Paul Wilson) – 4:54
  - cover of song by Snow Patrol
13. "Young Mother" (Darryl Way, Sonja Kristina) – 6:45
  - first appeared on Second Album
14. "Across the Universe" (John Lennon, Paul McCartney) – 4:20

== Personnel ==
Curved Air

- Sonja Kristina – vocals
- Florian Pilkington-Miksa – drums
- Kirby Gregory – guitar
- Chris Harris – bass guitar and electric upright bass
- Robert Norton – keyboards
- Paul Sax – violin

Production credits

- Marvin Ayres – advisor, engineer, vocal engineer
- Beric Wickens – producer
- Denis Blackham – mastering
- Nuno Fernandes – engineer
- Carl Glover – graphic design, montage, photography
- Michael Inns – portraits
- Chris Smith – engineer
- Ben Williams – engineer
