= Lovechild (album) =

Studio album by Curved Air
- Released: 8 October 1990
- Recorded: July 1973, London
- Genres: Progressive rock, folk rock
- Length: 34:24
- Label: UK Essential/Castle
- Producer: Clifford Adams

Curved Air chronology
Airborne (1976)	Lovechild (1990)	Live at the BBC (1995)

Lovechild is a studio album credited to progressive rock band Curved Air, though only half the tracks are actually performed by the group. The album consists of previously unreleased demos overseen by Clifford Adams in the early 1970s: one by John O'Hara, two by Eddie Jobson, one by Kirby Gregory, and four by Curved Air. Vocalist Sonja Kristina explained the album's origin:

Now that album was total piracy. Those were demo tapes I made for Warner Brothers, who had suddenly realized that I was the only original member — that it wasn't really Curved Air as it had been before. So Clifford Davis presented the tapes to Warners[sic] who decided for various reasons that they weren't going to continue with the contract.

As implied in Sonja Kristina's comment, Lovechild is essentially an "official" bootleg; neither Warner Brothers nor any of the band members gave permission for the demos to be released, and no royalties were paid to any of the band members from its sales. Years after she made the above comments, however, Repertoire Records obtained permission from both Warner Brothers and the musicians to reissue the album, and in 2011 a legit version with new liner notes was released, though unlike the original release it appeared only on CD.

The four Curved Air demos were recorded between Air Cut and the band's breakup. Jim Russell and Kirby Gregory had already left, and were replaced on the demos by Florian Pilkington-Miksa and Icelandic guitarist Thordur Arnason, known to the other band members as simply "Thor".

The album's cover is simply the artwork from the front cover of Air Conditioning superimposed on the artwork from the back cover of that same album.

== Track listing ==
No.	Title	Lyrics	Music	Length
1.	"Exsultate Jubilate" (Instrumental)	-	Traditional; arranged O'Hara	0:45
2.	"Lovechild"	Kristina	Kristina	4:53
3.	"Seasons"	Kristina	Kristina	8:41
4.	"The Flasher" (Instrumental)	-	Kirby	4:12
5.	"Joan" (Instrumental)	-	Jobson	1:24
6.	"The Dancer"	Kristina	Kristina	3:55
7.	"The Widow"	Kristina	Kristina	3:51
8.	"Paris by Night" (Instrumental)	-	Jobson	6:43

== Personnel ==
- Sonja Kristina – vocals, acoustic guitar
- Eddie Jobson – keyboards (except on "Exsultate Jubilate"), violin
- Florian Pilkington-Miksa – drums (except on "The Flasher")
- Mike Wedgwood – bass (except on "The Flasher")
- Thordur Arnason – electric guitar (except on "The Flasher")
- Kirby Gregory – electric guitar on "The Flasher"
- Jim Russell – drums on "The Flasher"
- John O'Hara – keyboards and arrangement on "Exsultate Jubilate"

Production credits

- Produced by Clifford Adams
- Published by C.A.M.
- Mixing Engineer: Steve Price, Assistant: Declan McGoven
- Recorded in London July 1973
- Mixed at C.T.S. Studios London March 1990
