= Back Street Luv =

Single by Curved Air

from the album Second Album
- B-side: "Everdance"
- Released: 18 June 1971
- Genre: Art rock
- Length: 3:36
- Label: Warner Bros.
- Songwriters: Darryl Way, Sonja Kristina, Ian Eyre
- Producers: Colin Caldwell, Curved Air

Curved Air singles chronology
"It Happened Today" (1971)	"Back Street Luv" (1971)	"Sarah's Concern" (1972)

Performance video
- "Back Street Luv" on BeatClub (1971) on YouTube

"Back Street Luv" is a song by British rock band Curved Air, written by band members Darryl Way, Sonja Kristina, and Ian Eyre. It was included on the Second Album and released as a single in June 1971 by Warner Bros. Warners also released it as a single in the Netherlands, Germany, France and Portugal. In 1975 a live version appeared on Curved Air – Live and was released as a single in the UK by Deram, but it failed to make any commercial impact.

Rock music critic Dave Thompson called the song "one of the band's own finest moments" and "also one of the crucial singles of the early 1970s".

In 1997, Salad covered the song on the Childline charity album.

== Track list ==
No.	Title	Length
1.	"Back Street Luv"	3:36
2.	"Everdance"	3:06

== Personnel ==
=== Original studio version ===
- Sonja Kristina — vocals
- Francis Monkman — EMS VCS 3, Hohner Pianet, guitar, Hammond organ
- Ian Eyre – bass
- Florian Pilkington-Miksa — drums

(Darryl Way, though the chief writer of the song's music, does not play on the original recording.)

=== Beat-Club performance, 1971 ===
- Sonja Kristina — vocals, percussion
- Darryl Way – electric piano
- Francis Monkman — Hammond organ, guitar, keyboards
- Ian Eyre – bass
- Barry de Souza — drums

=== Live version from Curved Air – Live, 1975 ===
- Sonja Kristina – vocal
- Darryl Way – VCS3, electric piano
- Francis Monkman – guitar, organ
- Phil Kohn – bass
- Florian Pilkington-Miksa – drums

=== Live version from Alive, 1990 ===
- Sonja Kristina – lead vocal
- Darryl Way – synthesizers, backing vocal
- Francis Monkman – guitar, bass
- Florian Pilkington-Miksa – drums

== Album appearances ==
- 1971 — Second Album (3:36, WEA International)
- 1971 — Second Album (5:56, Collectors' Choice Music)
- 1975 — Live (3:47, Repertoire)
- 1976 — Best of Curved Air (Warner Bros.)
- 1994 — Progression (Alex Records)
- 1995 — Journey to the Edge: Progressive Rock Classics (3:35, Music Collection)
- 1995 — The No. 1 70s Rock Album (3:40 Alex)
- 1995 — Progressive Pop: Inside the 70s (3:50, See For Miles Records)
- 1999 — Rock Festival (Insight)
- 2000 — Alive, 1990 (4:26, Mystic Records)
- 2006 — Absolute 70s (Crimson Productions)
- 2006 — Classic Rock Presents Prog Rock (3:37, Gut-Active)
- 2006 — Good Morning Vietnam 2 (3:50, Disky)
- 2006 — My Sounds Rock (Disky)
- 2007 — Head Full of Rock (3:36, EMI)
- 2007 — The Prog Rock Album (3:38, Crimson Productions)
- 2007 — The Sound of the 70s (3:35, Warner Strategic Marketing)
- 2008 — The Best of Curved Air (Repertoire)
- 2008 — Legendary Rock (3:48, MP Records)
- 2010 — The Old Grey Whistle Test (3:33, Rhino)
