= Live at the BBC (Curved Air album) =

Live album by Curved Air
- Released: 27 December 1995
- Recorded: 1970–1971 and 1976
- Genres: Progressive rock, folk rock
- Label: Band Of Joy
- Producers: John Walters (tracks 1 to 3); John Muir (tracks 4 to 6); Frances Line (tracks 7 to 8); Mike Appleton (tracks 9 to 11)

Curved Air chronology
Lovechild (1976)	Live at the BBC (1995)	Alive, 1990 (2000)

Live at the BBC is a compilation live album of the British progressive rock band Curved Air from sessions on:

- 10 November 1970 (tracks 1–3)
- 5 January 1971 (tracks 4–5)
- 9 March 1971 (tracks 6–8)
- 29 January 1976 in concert at Paris Theatre, London (tracks 9–13)

The album's liner notes give conflicting dates for the sessions. The prose section lists the dates as above, while a secondary listing dates tracks 1–3 as 28 April 1970, places track 6 in the same session as tracks 4–5, and provides the unlikely date of 27 January 1971 (just three weeks after the previous session) for tracks 7 and 8.

The album was released in 1995.

The songs "Thinking On The Floor" and "Stark Naked" were never recorded in the studio, while the lyrics for "Young Mother In Style" are different from those of the song "Young Mother" on their Second Album.

== Reception ==
Professional ratings
Review scores
Source	Rating
Allmusic	3/5 stars

Allmusic said the album was "typical of BBC rock compilations, with alternate live radio versions that serious fans will find highly enjoyable, though more casual admirers will find the material unnecessary." They noted the solid sound quality and lightly praised the band's blending of classical, rock, and folk.

== Track listing ==
1. "Vivaldi" (Darryl Way) – 6:25
2. "Propositions" (Francis Monkman)/"What Happens When You Blow Yourself Up" (Monkman, Sonja Kristina Linwood) – 5:23
3. "It Happened Today" (Monkman, Linwood) – 4:39
4. "Young Mother In Style" (Way, Linwood) – 5:14
5. "Situations" (Way, Rob Martin) – 5:38
6. "Blind Man" (Way, Martin) – 2:45
7. "Thinking On The Floor" (Way, Linwood) – 4:01
8. "Stretch" (Way, Monkman) – 4:34
9. "Stark Naked" (Way, Mick Jacques, Stewart Copeland, Phil Kohn, Linwood) – 5:44
10. "Woman On A One Night Stand" (Linwood, Norma Tager) – 5:43
11. "Midnight Wire" (Way, Tager) – 6:20
12. "Hot 'N' Bothered" (Jacques, Tager) – 3:02
13. "The Fool" (Way, Jacques, Tager) – 6:43

== Personnel ==
- Sonja Kristina – vocals
- Darryl Way – violin, vocals
- Francis Monkman – guitar, keyboards (tracks 1 to 8)
- Rob Martin – bass (tracks 1 to 3)
- Florian Pilkington-Miksa – drums (tracks 1 to 8)
- Ian Eyre – bass (tracks 4 to 8)
- Mick Jacques – guitar (tracks 9 to 13)
- Tony Reeves – bass (tracks 9 to 13)
- Stewart Copeland – drums (tracks 9 to 13)

Production credits

- Producer - Frances Line (tracks 7 to 8), John Muir (tracks 4 to 6), John Walters (tracks 1 to 3), Mike Appleton (tracks 9 to 11)
- Engineer - Bob Conduct (tracks 1 to 3), John White (tracks 4 to 6), Tom Corcoran (tracks 9 to 11)
