= Curved Air =

English progressive rock group

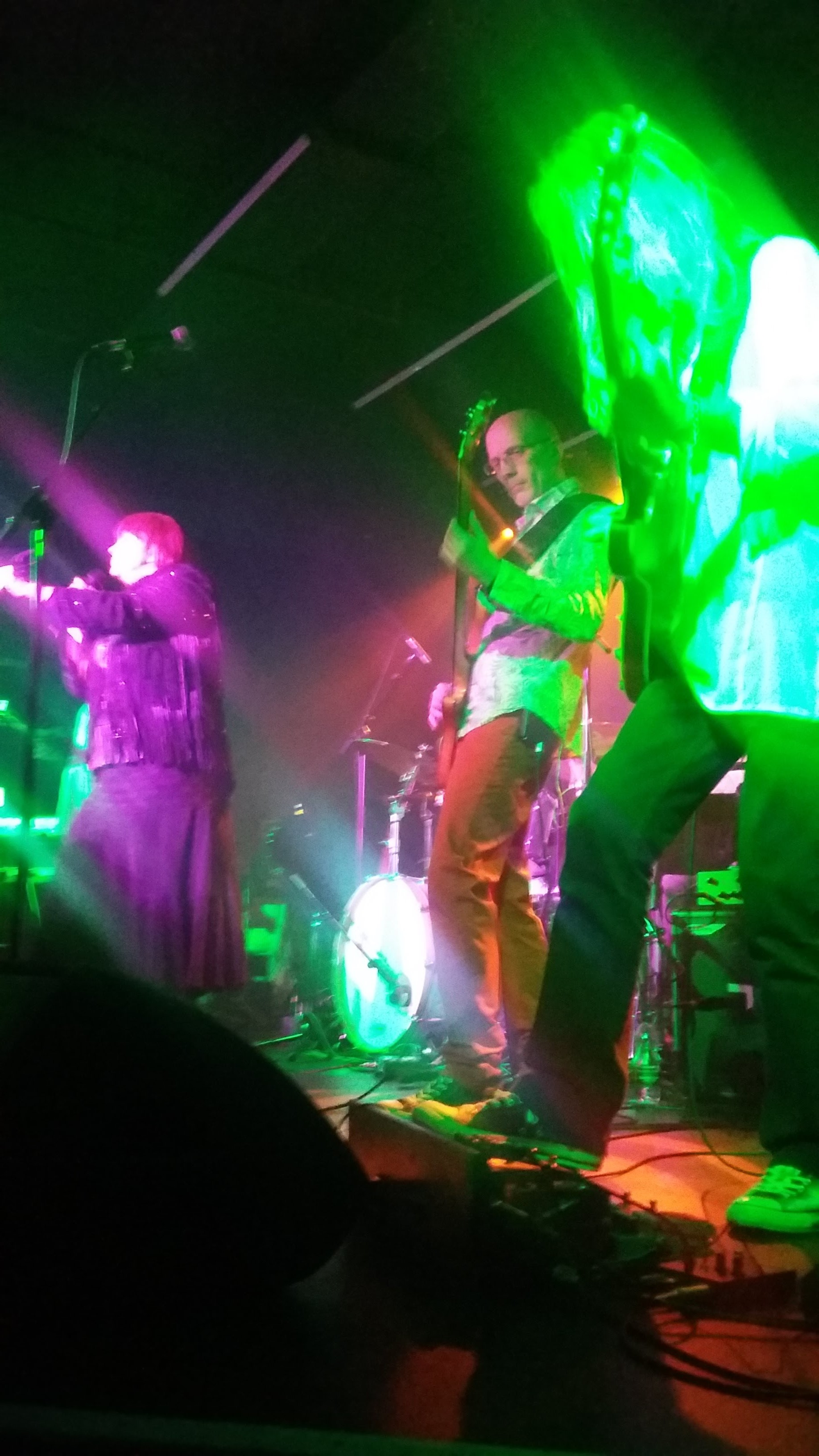
- Curved Air live in 2018. Sonja Kristina (Left), Chris Harris (Centre), Kit Morgan (Right), Andy Tween (Obscured)

Background information
- Origin: London, England
- Genre: Progressive rock
- Years active: 1970–1973; 1974–1976; 1984; 1988; 1990; 2008–present
- Labels: Warner Bros.; Deram; BTM
- Spinoff of: Sisyphus
- Members: Sonja Kristina; Kirby Gregory; Chris Harris; Robert Norton; Andy Tween; Grzegorz Gadziomski
- Past members: Darryl Way; Francis Monkman; Florian Pilkington-Miksa; Mike Wedgwood; Eddie Jobson; Stewart Copeland; Tony Reeves; Barry De Souza; Kit Morgan; Rob Martin; Ian Eyre; Jim Russell; Phil Kohn; Mick Jacques; Alex Richman; Andy Christie; Paul Sax; George Hudson
- Website: www.curvedair.com

Curved Air are an English progressive rock group formed in 1970 by musicians from mixed artistic backgrounds, including classical, folk and electronic sound. The resulting sound of the band is a mixture of progressive rock, folk rock, and fusion with classical elements. Curved Air released eight studio albums, the first three of which broke into the Top 20 in the UK Albums Chart, and had a hit single with "Back Street Luv" (1971) which reached number 4 in the UK Singles Chart.

== Band history ==
=== Sisyphus ===
The group evolved out of the band Sisyphus, who played one of their early gigs in the ballroom of Leith Hill Place, Surrey for a masked ball and which was formed by Darryl Way (who studied violin at Dartington College and the Royal College of Music) and Francis Monkman, a member of the Royal Academy of Music. While wandering through an outlet store of the Orange Music Electronic Company, Monkman was intrigued by the sound of Way testing his first electrically amplified violin, and the two "got to talking." They discovered they had a lot in common, and in 1969 invited pianist Nick Simon who, along with bassist Rob Martin and drummer Florian Pilkington-Miksa, completed the line-up of Sisyphus. "Darryl and Nick were very much into Spirit. One could cite them as a formative influence for Curved Air", Monkman later remembered. Many of the early Curved Air songs were written for Sisyphus, among them "Young Mother in Style" and "Screw".

Sisyphus was hired to provide accompaniment for Galt MacDermot's new play, Who the Murderer Was, at the Mercury Theatre in Notting Hill Gate, serving as the pit band. Mark Hanau, an aspiring band manager at the time, saw the show and decided he wanted to manage Sisyphus. He felt that Sonja Kristina, an aspiring folk musician whom he had seen in the London stage production of Hair, was the missing ingredient in the group. On 1 January 1970, Hanau contacted her through the singer and impresario Roy Guest. She listened to a cassette of the band's music and was impressed. With Kristina's joining and Nick Simon's departure, Sisyphus metamorphosed into Curved Air, named after the album A Rainbow in Curved Air by contemporary composer Terry Riley. The name was suggested by Monkman who, having played in the first London performance of In C, was a great fan of Riley. The band's new sound immediately came together, and the five-piece Curved Air was born, Sonja Kristina being both the band's voice and its sex symbol.

=== From formation to first breakup ===
Tony [Brainsby] did very well and the music press came and checked us out and liked what they saw... We played the Roundhouse in Chalk Farm several times, and each time we were further up the bill, until we were headlining.

— Sonja Kristina

After a series of intensive rehearsals in Martin's family home in Gloucestershire, the five-piece launched a well-received UK tour, supporting Black Sabbath at one point. The band toured with their own sound engineer, Shaun Davies (later the producer for Way's post-Curved Air band, Wolf), which allowed them to achieve a better on-stage sound mix than other groups with unusual combinations of instruments. Shaun's father, Guy Davies, made the perspex violins used by Way and later Jobson. Curved Air publicist Tony Brainsby fanned the enthusiastic audience response and a bidding war for the band ensued, and in summer 1970 Curved Air signed with Warner Bros., becoming the first British band on the company's roster. The band received a much-publicized advance of £100,000 and their debut album Air Conditioning was released in November notable for its being issued as the first commercially available LP picture disc in the UK. The album reached number 8 in the UK Albums Chart, preceded by a single, "It Happened Today". John Peel picked up on the band and they performed on several Peel radio Sessions and Roundhouse ‘Implosion’ events.

Curved Air – "Back Street Luv"
18 seconds (of 3:35)

Bass player Rob Martin left due to a hand injury, and was replaced by Ian Eyre. The band released "Back Street Luv" which reached number 4 in the UK Singles Chart to become the band's most successful single to date. The Second Album peaked at number 11. A non-LP follow-up single, "Sarah's Concern", went by unnoticed.

The band played three U.S. tours and built a cult following there. In the course of constant touring drummer Pilkington-Miksa became ill in late 1971 and, for several months, Barry de Souza, who band members knew from studio work, sat in for him. It was de Souza who played with Curved Air at the 1971 Beat Club German TV performance of "Back Street Luv", the televised version of which became well known. In late 1971, Sonja Kristina joined Faces, Soft Machine, Marc Bolan and David Bedford to do a Christmas radio show for the BBC.

One highlighted performance was on 7 May 1971 when Curved Air was the opening act for B.B. King and Johnny Winter at the Warehouse in New Orleans.

By the time of the third album's release, serious musical differences within the band emerged. According to Sonja Kristina's Cherry Red interview (2007), Francis was fascinated with overtones and natural harmonies, and "His other obsession is/was jamming... real 'out there' cosmic rock jamming. And that is not Darryl at all... He's a very disciplined perfectionist, he likes things to be as precise and exquisite as possible. Whereas Francis is completely the opposite way; he just wants to play and things just come out of the cosmos". As Monkman explained,

Basically Darryl and I respect each others' work, but we don't really see eye-to-eye on most things. And we never really got the co-writing thing together. I wanted to get my first "epic" together, so it looks like a split forming at the time of the Second Album. In fact, the centre was never really solid after Rob left.

This division was reflected in the arrangement of tracks on Second Album and Phantasmagoria; side A of both albums was occupied by music composed by Darryl Way, while side B was devoted solely to Monkman's compositions, with no true collaboration between the two writers. While working in the studio the band was in a dire condition. "I remember the moment when Clifford Davis, our manager after Mark Hanau, spelled out what we were going to have to do just to get somewhere near even. We felt burned out", Monkman later said. By the end of 1972 Monkman was a self-admitted "nervous wreck" and on the verge of physical and mental breakdown. He had to wear earplugs to go on the London Underground and went to a naturopath three times a week.

Phantasmagoria was recorded with bassist/guitarist Mike Wedgwood, who replaced Eyre. The album's title was drawn from the Lewis Carroll poem of the same title. The album came out in April 1972 and reached number 20 in the UK Albums Chart.

Curved Air split up, Way formed Darryl Way's Wolf, Pilkington-Miksa joined Kiki Dee's band, and Monkman moved into session work and was later to play in, among others, the supergroup Sky.

=== The new Curved Air ===
I don't think Florian thought it would really be Curved Air any more. Do you know that the new band was to be called the Sonja Kristina Band or Kristina – Wedgwood or something, but we were informed (by management) that it would be called Curved Air!

— Mike Wedgwood

Having retained a good working relationship, Sonja Kristina and Mike Wedgwood formed a new band with Kirby Gregory (electric guitar), Eddie Jobson (keyboards, violin), and Jim Russell (drums). Jobson had come from a band called Fat Grapple, who had been one of Curved Air's support acts on tour. The new musicians brought more direct rock energy, with young prodigy Eddie Jobson, influenced by Curved Air, kept the classical blend strongly in the mix. On the suggestion of manager Clifford Davis, they continued using the name Curved Air with the approval and support of the departing band members.

Kristina later commented:

What I wanted to do with the band at the time was get more of a rock edge to it, and Kirby's guitar playing really excited me – he was just really wild. And Jim was the same way, a very solid rock drummer. Mike and I really wanted to continue, and it was our manager Clifford Davis who said we would do a better business continuing to call the band Curved Air. So we kept the name and followed along the same pattern as before, as a writer's band. Everybody in the new band contributed material except for Jim Russell, who really wasn't a writer. Before it had mainly been Darryl and Francis, but I had managed to get some of my compositions in.

Whereas all three of the original Curved Air's albums had broken the UK top 20, the new band's sole album, Air Cut, failed to chart at the time.

Not long after the release, Eddie Jobson was asked to replace Brian Eno in Roxy Music, so Kirby Gregory and Jim Russell both left the group to form Stretch. Sonja Kristina recorded a demo tape for Warner Brothers but they discontinued the contract. (These demos were later issued as part of the Lovechild record). Mike Wedgwood joined Caravan.

=== Reunion ===
In 1974 Chrysalis sued the band. "We had broken their contract on the advice of Clifford Davis, who said we could prove that they had not been acting in our best interests, but by then he was no longer our manager!" Monkman explained. In order to discharge an enormous unpaid VAT bill, in September 1974 the band's mainstays (Kristina, Way, Monkman, and Pilkington-Miksa) reunited for a three-week tour of the UK, put together by Darryl Way's manager, Miles Copeland III. The reunion interrupted Way's new band, Stark Naked and the Car Thieves, and since the bass slot for Curved Air needed filling, Way brought along the new band's bassist, Phil Kohn.

The reunion tour saw Sonja Kristina play her role as Curved Air's sex symbol far more dramatically than she had before. Between the band's previous breakup and the reunion tour she had worked as a croupier at the London Playboy Club and returned to the stage with Curved Air in see through lace, feathers and beads, highlighting her sexuality.

A live album and single were recorded during the lauded three week reunion tour, and they succeeded in paying off the tax bill. With their debts paid, Monkman and Pilkington-Miksa had no more reason to remain in the band. And so, Curved Air broke up for the third time in as many years.

=== Stark Naked, the Car Thieves, and Curved Air ===
However, Darryl Way wanted to continue Curved Air with Sonja Kristina. Way brought in two more "Car Thieves", guitarist Mick Jacques and drummer Stewart Copeland, Miles Copeland III's brother. Now more members of this new lineup came from Stark Naked and the Car Thieves than Curved Air . With Darryl Way at the helm, this new band often employed the same classical and folk influences as the original band and played the now classic Curved Air songs at their shows), but their core sound was rooted in pop, rhythm and blues, and hard rock. Miles Copeland III, still serving as Curved Air's manager, put the group on his own label, BTM.

The band kicked off with a European tour, which started poorly. Way, a notorious perfectionist, grew impatient with the struggling of his bandmates, especially novice drummer Copeland. Eventually, the musicians found a way of working together and became a popular live act.

The group struggled with studio work. Phil Kohn left and the band, unable to replace him in time for the sessions for Midnight Wire, relied on guest musicians to play both bass (John G Perry) and keyboards (Peter Wood). Norma Tager, a friend of Kristina's, penned the lyrics to the "Midnight Wire" songs. Kohn was later replaced by Tony Reeves, formerly of Colosseum and Greenslade, but the recording sessions for both Midnight Wire and 1976's Airborne were expensive and highly stressful for everyone involved. Both albums – as well as "Desiree", a single drawn from Airborne – failed to break the charts.

Finally we just played England too many times. ...we had no more new material, we didn't have much else in common, and there was little prospect of improvement. So we just decided to round off our schedule and leave it at that. Sort of 'Call me if you can think of anything.'

— Stewart Copeland

Citing dissatisfaction with BTM Records' inability to support Curved Air financially, Way departed. Though Alex Richman from the Butts Band stepped in on keyboards, the loss of the band's de facto leader was a blow. This line-up's final release was a cover version of "Baby Please Don't Go” and although the shows were sold out and always successful the new recordings did not chart. After months of gradually losing steam, Curved Air broke up so quietly that, by Sonja Kristina's recollections, most of the music press wrote off the band's absence as a "sabbatical". Copeland formed The Police, Reeves returned to work as a producer and played in semi-pro band Big Chief along with Jacques, and Kristina and Way both pursued solo careers. Kristina and Copeland maintained the romantic relationship they had formed while bandmates and were married in 1982.

=== Interim ===
Curved Air as a group were largely inactive for the next three decades, though a handful of retrospective releases and compilations were released during this time. (Warner Bros. Records released the band's first compilation, The Best of Curved Air, in April 1976, though it naturally only contained material from the band's four Warner Bros. albums.)

In 1984, Darryl Way asked Sonja Kristina to provide vocals to several of his solo recordings, two of which, "Renegade" and "We're Only Human", were released as a single under the Curved Air name. A third track, a cover of "O Fortuna", was released as a Sonja Kristina solo track on the b-side to "Walk on By", but was withdrawn due to objections from the Carl Orff estate. Yet another track, "As Long as There's a Spark", was originally recorded by Way and Kristina, but released as a Darryl Way solo track, with Way performing the vocals himself. Way and Kristina followed these recordings with a short tour in 1988, again under the Curved Air name.

In 1990 the original Kristina, Way, Monkman and Pilkington-Miksa quartet gave a one-off reunion concert at the London's Town & Country, supported by Noden's Ictus. The performance, recorded by Francis Monkman, was captured on the Alive, 1990 album, released in 2000.

Following the one-off reunion, guitarist Mike Gore instigated a series of jam sessions which involved three fifths of Curved Air's original lineup: Monkman, Pilkington-Miksa, and Martin. In 1991 several of these jams were recorded, ultimately being released as a Monkman solo album called Jam in 2002.

=== 2008 onwards ===
In early 2008, the band regrouped. On 4 May 2008, in a message to the Curved Air Yahoo Group, Kristina advised that the new line-up would be herself, Darryl Way (violin), Florian Pilkington-Miksa (drums), Andy Christie (guitar) and Chris Harris (bass). Francis Monkman, who was originally pictured with Kristina, Way and Pilkington-Miksa for the reunion, left the project. "Unfortunately, he didn't have the same vision as the rest of us as to how (the new project) should be approached and wasn't prepared to compromise, so our ways had to part", commented Way. Sonja Kristina confirmed, "Francis was in at the beginning but had extremely different ideas from Darryl about how he wanted this new Curved Air to prepare and develop. Eventually, he withdrew. We continued with Darryl as our musical director and producer." The new line-up played in Southern England, Italy and Malta in 2008.

In 2008 a CD/box set Reborn was released, with 12 re-recorded Curved Air tracks and two new songs ("Coming Home" and "The Fury"). Two of the oldies, "Melinda" and "Elfin Boy", were reworked and produced by Marvin Ayres. As Way explained, the band had two reasons for this: they were never satisfied with the way those tracks were originally recorded and they wanted to have the product that they owned and were in control of. "Reborn was our way of preparing for the live work", Sonja Kristina added. On Friday, 13 June, Curved Air performed at the Isle of Wight Festival to a generally positive response.

For the 2009 dates in Japan on 16 and 17 January at Club Citta, Kawasaki, the guitarist was Kit Morgan who replaced Christie. On 9 August 2009, Eddie Jobson stood in for Darryl Way at a one-off gig in Chislehurst.

A live album consisting of recordings from the previous UK tour, Live Atmosphere, was released on 2 April 2012.

Way was indisposed for their dates in October 2009 and Robert Norton (keyboards) and Paul Sax (violin) stood in for him. Sax had played on Sonja Kristina's 1991 album Songs from The Acid Folk and both Sax and Norton played on her 1995 album Harmonics of Love. "Robert Norton is exceptional – as is Paul Sax, a master violinist – one of the first entrants to the Yehudi Menuhin school – a passionate and brave performer very well qualified to step into Darryl's light ... Chris Harris is literally our root on bass and Kit Morgan the fire on guitar. Great chemistry and communication," Sonja Kristina commented. This lineup (Kristina, Pilkington-Miksa, Harris, Morgan, Sax and Norton) continued to gig as Curved Air until 2013. The band played at the London High Voltage Festival 2011 (23–24 July), alongside Spock's Beard, Jethro Tull, Dream Theater, and Queensrÿche, among others.

In October 2013, Kirby Gregory returned to replace Kit Morgan on guitar. The new lineup (Kristina, Pilkington-Miksa, Harris, Gregory, Sax and Norton) initially played a couple of dates in the UK before recording a new studio album, North Star, released on 17 March 2014, supported by a 10-date tour from 1 March to 19 April with the Acoustic Strawbs and Martin Turner's Wishbone Ash.

On 4 September 2015, Curved Air played a special concert at Under The Bridge, London, to mark the 45th Anniversary of the release of Air Conditioning. The album was played in full for the first time. The band was joined on stage by Darryl Way for "Vivaldi" and two other songs. Ian Eyre also played bass during "Back Street Luv".

Kit Morgan returned to the band in November 2016, replacing Kirby Gregory, but left in August 2018 because of problems with his back, so former Purson guitarist George Hudson made his live debut with the band at The New Day Festival in Kent. Florian Pilkington-Miksa left in November 2017 and was replaced by Andy Tween.

In 2019, Kirby Gregory returned on guitar in place of Hudson, and Grzegorz Gadziomski replaced Paul Sax on violin, both playing with the band at London's 100 Club on 17 October. The same line-up (Kristina, Harris, Gregory, Norton, Tween and Gadziomski) toured the UK in November 2025.

A UK farewell tour planned for August and September 2026 ending in a gig at the Nene Valley Festival was postponed reportedly due to illness among members of the band. The entire tour dates were moved to August and September 2027 adding an extra appearance in Exeter.

== Personnel ==
=== Members ===
Current members

- Sonja Kristina – vocals (1970–1976, 1984, 1988, 1990, 2008–present)
- Kirby Gregory – guitar, backing vocals (1972–1973, 2013–2016, 2019–present)
- Chris Harris – bass (2008–present)
- Robert Norton – keyboards (2009–present)
- Andy Tween – drums (2017–present)
- Grzegorz Gadziomski – violin (2019–present)

Former members

- Darryl Way – violin, keyboards, backing vocals, guitars, drum machine (1970–1972, 1974–1976, 1984, 1988, 1990, 2008–2009)
- Francis Monkman – keyboards, guitar (1970–1972, 1974, 1990; died 2023)
- Florian Pilkington-Miksa – drums (1970–1972, 1974, 1990, 2008–2017; died 2021)
- Rob Martin – bass guitar (1970; substitute - 1990)
- Ian Paul Eyre – bass guitar (1970–1971; died 2022)
- Mike Wedgwood – bass guitar, vocals, guitar (1971–1973)
- Eddie Jobson – keyboards, violin, backing vocals (1972–1973; substitute – 2009)
- Jim Russell – drums (1972–1973)
- Phil Kohn – bass guitar (1974–1975)
- Mick Jacques – guitars (1975–1976)
- Tony Reeves – bass, keyboards (1975–1976)
- Stewart Copeland – drums (1975–1976)
- Alex Richman – keyboards (1976)
- Andy Christie – guitar (2008–2009)
- Kit Morgan – guitar (2009–2013, 2016–2018)
- Paul Sax – violin (2009–2019)
- George Hudson – guitar (2018–2019)

Substitute musicians

- Barry de Souza – drums (1971; filled in for Pilkington-Miksa)

=== Lineups ===
January 1970 – April 1970	April 1970 – Late 1971	Late 1971 – Late 1972	Late 1972 – Summer 1973
Sonja Kristina – vocals; Darryl Way – violin, keyboards, backing vocals; Francis Monkman – keyboards, guitar; Rob Martin – bass guitar; Florian Pilkington-Miksa – drums	Sonja Kristina – vocals; Darryl Way – violin, keyboards, backing vocals; Francis Monkman – keyboards, guitar; Florian Pilkington-Miksa – drums; Ian Eyre – bass guitar; Additional personnel: Barry de Souza – drums (filled in for Pilkington-Miksa - 1971)	Sonja Kristina – vocals; Darryl Way – violin, keyboards, backing vocals; Francis Monkman – keyboards, guitar; Florian Pilkington-Miksa – drums; Mike Wedgwood – bass guitar, vocals, guitar	Sonja Kristina – vocals, acoustic guitar; Mike Wedgwood – bass guitar, vocals, guitar; Eddie Jobson – keyboards, violin, backing vocals; Kirby Gregory – guitar, backing vocals; Jim Russell – drums
Summer 1973	Summer 1973 – September 1974	September 1974 – December 1974	Late 1974 – Early 1975
Sonja Kristina – vocals, acoustic guitar; Mike Wedgwood – bass guitar, vocals, guitar; Eddie Jobson – keyboards, violin, backing vocals	Disbanded	Sonja Kristina – vocals; Darryl Way – violin, keyboards, backing vocals; Francis Monkman – keyboards, guitar; Florian Pilkington-Miksa – drums; Phil Kohn – bass guitar	Sonja Kristina – vocals; Darryl Way – violin, keyboards, backing vocals; Phil Kohn – bass guitar; Mick Jacques – guitars; Stewart Copeland – drums
Early 1975 – Late 1975	Late 1975 – Late 1976	Late 1976	1976–1984
Sonja Kristina – vocals; Darryl Way – violin, keyboards, backing vocals; Mick Jacques – guitars; Stewart Copeland – drums	Sonja Kristina – vocals; Darryl Way – violin, keyboards, backing vocals; Mick Jacques – guitars; Stewart Copeland – drums; Tony Reeves – bass	Sonja Kristina – vocals; Mick Jacques – guitars; Stewart Copeland – drums; Tony Reeves – bass; Alex Richman – keyboards	Disbanded
1984	1984 – September 1990	September 1990	September 1990 – Early 2008
Sonja Kristina – vocals; Darryl Way – violin, keyboards, guitars, drum machine	Disbanded	Sonja Kristina – vocals; Darryl Way – violin, keyboards, backing vocals; Francis Monkman – keyboards, guitar, bass; Florian Pilkington-Miksa – drums; Additional personnel: Rob Martin – bass	Disbanded
Early 2008 – January 2009	January 2009 – October 2009	October 2009 – October 2013	October 2013 – November 2016
Sonja Kristina – vocals; Darryl Way – violin, keyboards, backing vocals; Florian Pilkington-Miksa – drums; Andy Christie – guitar; Chris Harris – bass	Sonja Kristina – vocals; Darryl Way – violin, keyboards, backing vocals; Florian Pilkington-Miksa – drums; Chris Harris – bass; Kit Morgan – guitar; Additional personnel: Eddie Jobson – keyboards, violin (filled in for Way – August 2009)	Sonja Kristina – vocals; Florian Pilkington-Miksa – drums; Chris Harris – bass; Kit Morgan – guitar; Robert Norton – keyboards; Paul Sax – violin	Sonja Kristina – vocals; Florian Pilkington-Miksa – drums; Chris Harris – bass; Robert Norton – keyboards; Paul Sax – violin; Kirby Gregory – guitar
November 2016 - November 2017	November 2017 - August 2018	August 2018 - September 2019	October 2019 – Present
Sonja Kristina – vocals; Florian Pilkington-Miksa – drums; Chris Harris – bass; Robert Norton – keyboards; Paul Sax – violin; Kit Morgan – guitar	Sonja Kristina – vocals; Chris Harris – bass; Robert Norton – keyboards; Paul Sax – violin; Kit Morgan – guitar; Andy Tween – drums	Sonja Kristina – vocals; Chris Harris – bass; Robert Norton – keyboards; Paul Sax – violin; Andy Tween – drums; George Hudson – guitar	Sonja Kristina – vocals; Chris Harris – bass; Robert Norton – keyboards; Andy Tween – drums; Grzegorz Gadziomski – violin; Kirby Gregory – guitar

== Discography ==
=== Studio albums ===
Year	Title	Chart-positions	Comments
Year	Title	UK	Comments
1970	Air Conditioning	8	
1971	Second Album	11	
1972	Phantasmagoria	20	
1973	Air Cut	–	
1975	Midnight Wire	–	
1976	Airborne	–	
2014	North Star	–	Studio album with seven new songs, three re-workings of Curved Air songs, one re-working of a Sonja Kristina solo song, plus covers of songs by The Police, Snow Patrol and the Beatles.
2019	Curved Air Family Album	–	Rare band tracks, previously unreleased collaborations and solo tracks

=== Other albums ===
1975	Curved Air – Live	Live album
1976	The Best of Curved Air	compilation
1990	Lovechild	collection of demos recorded in 1973, some of which are by Curved Air
1995	Live at the BBC	Sessions from 1970, 1971, and 1976
2000	Alive, 1990	Live recording of 1990 reunion concert
2008	Reborn	New recordings of songs from the first five studio albums plus two new tracks especially written by Darryl Way for the album – The Fury and Coming Home.
2010	Retrospective	Anthology 1970–2009 including three tracks by MASK
2012	Live Atmosphere	Live album featuring recordings made during 2010/2011 tour

=== Singles ===
Year	Title	Chart-positions	Comments
Year	Title	UK	Comments
1971	"It Happened Today" b/w "What Happens When You Blow Yourself Up" "Vivaldi"	52	Warner Bros. Records WB 8023 (UK) 3-track single Warner Bros. Records 7470 (US) & 16 073 (Germany) – both countries issued without "Vivaldi"
1971	"Back Street Luv" b/w "Everdance"	4	Warner Bros. Records initially WB 8029 & later K 16092 (UK); Warner Bros. Records 7519 (US) & K 16 092 (Germany)
1972	"Sarah's Concern" b/w "Phantasmagoria"	–	Warner Bros. Records K 16164 (UK)
1974	"Back Street Luv" (re-issue) b/w "It Happened Today" (re-issue) "Marie Antoinette" "Ultra – Vivaldi"	–	Warner Bros. Records K 16412 (UK) 4-track EP
1975	"Back Street Luv" (Live version) b/w "It Happened Today" (Live version)	–	Deram Records DM 426 (UK)
1976	"Desiree" b/w "Kids to Blame"	–	BTM Records SBT 103 (UK)
1976	"Baby Please Don't Go" b/w "Broken Lady"	–	BTM Records SBT 106 (UK)
1984	"Renegade" b/w "We're Only Human"	–	Pearlkey Records PK 07350 (UK) – credited as Curved Air '84
