= Alive, 1990 =

Live album by Curved Air
- Released: Nov 28, 2000
- Recorded: 23 September 1990
- Venues: The Town and Country Club 2, London
- Genres: Progressive rock, folk rock
- Length: 72:58
- Label: Mystic
- Producer: Francis Monkman

Curved Air chronology
Live at the BBC (1976)	Alive, 1990 (2000)	Reborn (2008)

Alive, 1990 is a recording from the Curved Air reunion concert 23 September 1990. The lineup reunited Sonja Kristina, Francis Monkman, Florian Pilkington-Miksa and Darryl Way, sixteen years after the last time all four of them played together.

Aside from the ambient introductory piece "Twenty Years On", all the material was taken from Curved Air's first three albums, with a particular emphasis on the debut album. Most of the running time is devoted to songs from the debut album.

The introductory track, "Twenty Years On", was taken from an audience recording on a mono cassette recorder, and hence is of exceptionally poor sound quality. Since the album was compiled chiefly for fans of the group, it was decided that it would be better to include a low-quality recording of the intro than none at all.

== Track listing ==
1. "Twenty Years on (Intro)" (Francis Monkman, Darryl Way) – 4:11
2. "It Happened Today" (Sonja Kristina, Monkman) – 5:31
3. "Stretch" (Monkman, Way) – 4:29
4. "Hide and Seek" (Kristina, Way) – 6:52
5. "Marie Antoinette" (Kristina, Way) – 7:04
6. "Melinda (More or Less)" (Kristina) – 4:14
7. "Situations" (Rob Martin, Way) – 5:43
8. "Young Mother" (Kristina, Way) – 7:06
9. "You Know" (Kristina, Way) – 3:45
10. "Propositions" (Monkman) – 5:15
11. "Vivaldi" (Way) – 9:59
12. "Everdance" (Monkman) – 4:15
13. "Backstreet Luv" (Ian Eyre, Kristina, Way) – 4:26

== Personnel ==
Curved Air

- Sonja Kristina – lead vocals; acoustic guitar on "Melinda"
- Darryl Way – electric violin, keyboards; backing vocal on "Backstreet Luv"
- Francis Monkman – keyboards, electric guitar, bass
- Florian Pilkington-Miksa – percussion

Guest musician

- Rob Martin – bass on "Vivaldi"

Production credits

- Artwork, Mastering, Post Production – Francis Monkman
