= Second Album (Curved Air album) =

Studio album by Curved Air
- Released: September 1971
- Studios: Island and Morgan, London
- Genres: Progressive rock, art rock
- Length: 42:15
- Label: Warner Bros.
- Producers: Curved Air, Colin Caldwell

Curved Air chronology
Air Conditioning (1970)	Second Album (1971)	Phantasmagoria (1972)

Alternative cover
- US album cover

Curved Air – "Back Street Luv"
19 seconds (of 3:35)

Second Album is the second studio album by English progressive rock band Curved Air, released in 1971. It reached No. 11 in the UK Charts on 9 October 1971, and "Back Street Luv" became a UK No. 4 chart hit on 7 August 1971.

Both variations of the album cover include a rainbow, a reference to the album A Rainbow in Curved Air by Terry Riley, from which the band took their name.

== Background and recording ==
The content and arrangement of the material reflected a sharp division in the band which would lead to their break-up the following year; all the songs on side A were composed by Darryl Way (with some assistance from Ian Eyre) with lyrics by Sonja Kristina, while all those on side B were composed by Francis Monkman. Francis Monkman explained: "Basically Darryl and I respect each other’s work, but we don't really see eye-to-eye on most things. And we never really got the co-writing thing together. I wanted to get my first 'epic' together, so it looks like a split forming (at the time of the "Second Album")."

Unlike Curved Air's first album, Second Album was recorded when most of the songs were freshly written and had had little time to be developed over the course of touring. An exception is "Young Mother", which in fact started as a song by Way, Monkman, and Pilkington-Miksa's pre-Curved Air band, Sisyphus. Then titled "Young Mother in Style", it evolved into the form seen on Second Album in part through the addition of new lyrics by Sonja Kristina.

The electronics used on the album were provided by E.M.S. London, later the recording site for two tracks on Curved Air's third album, Phantasmagoria.

== Reception ==
Professional ratings
Review scores
Source	Rating
AllMusic	2.5/5 stars

AllMusic's review of the CD reissue was largely negative, saying that the album lacks the innovation and originality of the band's other releases, replaced by "a crop of relatively straightforward but sonically flat rock songs". It notes that the album contains "Back Street Luv", which it says "isn't simply one of the band's own finest moments, it's also one of the crucial singles of the early 1970s." It further added that only "Piece of Mind" shows any of the classical influences the band was known for, and that, while "spine-tingling" in part, the song also contains features which are by modern standards "hopelessly old-fashioned", "obvious", and "hackneyed". The review suggests that poor sound quality following the transfer to CD may have contributed to the reviewer's less than favourable assessment of the album. Further, this review does not necessarily reflect the views of fans, many of whom consider it to be on par with the albums bookending it.

== Track listing ==
Side one
No.	Title	Writer(s)	Length
1.	"Young Mother"	Darryl Way, Sonja Kristina Linwood	5:55
2.	"Back Street Luv"	Way, Linwood, Ian Eyre	3:38
3.	"Jumbo"	Way, Linwood	4:11
4.	"You Know"	Way, Linwood	4:11
5.	"Puppets"	Way, Linwood	5:26

Side two
No.	Title	Writer(s)	Length
6.	"Everdance"	Francis Monkman	3:08
7.	"Bright Summer's Day '68"	Monkman	2:54
8.	"Piece of Mind"	Monkman	12:52

Bonus tracks on 2018 re-mastered & expanded edition
No.	Title	Writer(s)	Length
9.	"Young Mother in Style" (BBC Radio One, 5 Jan 1971)	Way, Linwood	4:07
10.	"It Happened Today" (BBC Radio One, 4 March 1971)	Monkman, Linwood	4:54
11.	"Blind Man" (BBC Radio One, 4 March 1971)	Rob Martin, Way	3:54
12.	"Propositions (including What Happens When You Blow Yourself Up)" (BBC Radio One, 4 March 1971)	Monkman, Linwood	6:58
13.	"Vivaldi" (BBC Radio One, 4 March 1971)	Way	9:06

2018 reissue, bonus DVD of television appearances
No.	Title	Writer(s)	Length
1.	"It Happened Today" (Curved Air promotional film, 1971)	Monkman, Linwood
2.	"Vivaldi" (Curved Air promotional film, 1971)	Way
3.	"Screw" (Curved Air promotional film, 1971)	Way
4.	"Back Street Luv" ("Pop Deux", recorded July 1971, broadcast Sept 1971)	Way, Linwood, Eyre
5.	"Propositions" ("Pop Deux", recorded July 1971, broadcast Sept 1971)	Monkman
6.	"Interview" ("Pop Deux", recorded July 1971, broadcast Sept 1971)
7.	"Vivaldi" ("Pop Deux", recorded July 1971, broadcast Sept 1971)	Way
8.	"It Happened Today" ("Beat Club" (Radio Bremen), recorded March 1971)	Monkman, Linwood
9.	"Propositions" ("Beat Club" (Radio Bremen), recorded March 1971)	Monkman
10.	"Vivaldi" ("Beat Club" (Radio Bremen), recorded March 1971)	Way
11.	"Back Street Luv (version 1)" ("Beat Club" (Radio Bremen), recorded Sept 1971)	Way, Linwood, Eyre
12.	"Piece of Mind" ("Beat Club" (Radio Bremen), recorded Sept 1971)	Monkman
13.	"Back Street Luv (version 2)" ("Beat Club" (Radio Bremen), recorded Sept 1971)	Way, Linwood, Eyre

== Personnel ==
Curved Air

- Sonja Kristina – lead vocals
- Darryl Way – violin, backing vocals, piano (5)
- Francis Monkman – guitars, keyboards, VCS3 synthesizer
- Ian Eyre – bass guitar
- Florian Pilkington-Miksa – drums

Technical

- Colin Caldwell – engineer
- Peter Zinovieff – electronics "by courtesy of"
- John Kosh – album design

== Other covers ==
Salad covered "Back Street Luv" on the 1996 Childline charity album.

== Charts ==
Chart (1971)	Peak position
UK Albums (Official Charts)	11

Chart (2018)	Peak position
UK Progressive Albums (Official Charts)	13
