= Phantasmagoria (Curved Air album) =

Studio album by Curved Air
- Released: April 1972
- Recorded: March 1972
- Studios: Advision Studios, London ("Ultra-Vivadi" and "Whose Shoulder Are You Looking Over Anyway?": E.M.S., London)
- Genres: Progressive rock; art rock
- Length: 38:04
- Label: Warner Bros.
- Producers: Curved Air; Colin Caldwell

Curved Air chronology
Second Album (1971)	Phantasmagoria (1972)	Air Cut (1973)

Phantasmagoria is the third studio album by Curved Air. Released in 1972, it reached No. 20 in the UK Charts and is notable for its early use of the EMS Synthi 100 synthesizer to process lead singer Sonja Kristina's voice on the second side. Unavailable for many years, the album was reissued on CD in April 2007.

== Reception ==
Professional ratings
Review scores
Source	Rating
Allmusic	4.5/5 stars

Allmusic called Phantasmagoria "the culmination of all that Curved Air promised over the course of its predecessors" and "the band's grandest hour by far". Their review praised the vast majority of the individual tracks, especially complimenting the blending of musical styles and absence of pretentiousness.

== Track listing ==
Side one
No.	Title	Writer(s)	Length
1.	"Marie Antoinette"	Darryl Way, Sonja Kristina Linwood	6:20
2.	"Melinda (More or Less)"	Linwood	3:25
3.	"Not Quite the Same"	Way, Linwood	3:44
4.	"Cheetah"	Way	3:33
5.	"Ultra-Vivaldi"	Way, Francis Monkman	1:22

Side two
No.	Title	Writer(s)	Length
6.	"Phantasmagoria"	Monkman	3:15
7.	"Whose Shoulder Are You Looking Over Anyway?"	Monkman	3:24
8.	"Over and Above"	Monkman	8:36
9.	"Once a Ghost, Always a Ghost"	Monkman, Linwood	4:25

Bonus tracks on 2018 re-mastered & expanded edition
No.	Title	Writer(s)	Length
10.	"Sarah's Concern" (single, released March 1972)	Way, Linwood	3:31
11.	"Marie Antoinette" (French version, previously unreleased)	Way, Linwood	3:49
12.	"Melinda (More or Less)" (Italian version, previously unreleased)	Linwood	3:29

2018 reissue, bonus DVD of television appearances
No.	Title	Writer(s)	Length
1.	"Marie Antoinette" ("Pop Shop" (Belgian TV), recorded April 1972)	Way, Linwood
2.	"Propositions" ("Pop Shop" (Belgian TV), recorded April 1972)	Monkman
3.	"Melinda (More or Less)" ("Pop Shop" (Belgian TV), recorded April 1972)	Linwood
4.	"Vivaldi" ("Pop Shop" (Belgian TV), recorded April 1972)	Way
5.	"Melinda (More or Less)" ("Spotlight" (Austrian TV), October 1972)	Linwood
6.	"Phantasmagoria" ("Spotlight" (Austrian TV), October 1972)	Monkman
7.	"Ultra-Vivaldi" ("Spotlight" (Austrian TV), October 1972)	Way, Monkman

"Ultra-Vivaldi" was incorrectly listed as length 2:22 on the label of initial green label pressings.

== Personnel ==
Curved Air

- Sonja Kristina – lead vocals, acoustic guitar (2)
- Darryl Way – violin, keyboards (1, 3), tubular bells (1), melon (1)
- Francis Monkman – keyboards, electric guitar, percussion (8, 9)
- Mike Wedgwood – bass, backing vocals, acoustic (6) and electric (9) guitar, percussion (9)
- Florian Pilkington-Miksa – drums, percussion (9)

Guest musicians

- Annie Stewart – flute (2)
- Crispian Steele-Perkins – trumpet
- Paul Cosh – trumpet
- James Watson – trumpet
- George Parnaby – trumpet
- Chris Pyne – trombone
- Alan Gout – trombone
- David Purser – trombone
- Steve Saunders – trombone
- Frank Ricotti – xylophone, vibes
- Mal Linwood-Ross – percussion
- Colin Caldwell – percussion
- Jean Akers – percussion
- Doris the Cheetah – vocals (4)

Technical

- Richard Rockwood – art direction
- John Gorham – cover illustration

== Charts ==
Chart (1972)	Peak position
UK Albums (Official Charts)	20

Chart (2018)	Peak position
UK Independent Albums (Official Charts)	45
