= Old Habits (disambiguation) =

"Old Habits" is a song by Hank Williams Jr.

Old Habits may also refer to:

- Old Habits (album), an unreleased album by Smash Mouth
- "Old Habits" (Rag'n'Bone Man song)
- Old Habits (film)
- "Old Habits" (Doctors)

== See also ==
- Old Habits Die Hard
- "Old Habits, New Beginnings", an episode of Strangers with Candy
