= Air Conditioning (album) =

- Picture disc "A'" side.

Studio album by Curved Air
- Released: November 1970
- Recorded: July 1970
- Studios: Island, London
- Genres: Progressive rock, art rock
- Length: 44:34
- Label: Warner Bros.
- Producer: Mark Edwards

Curved Air chronology
Air Conditioning (1970)	Second Album (1971)

Singles from Air Conditioning
- 1. "It Happened Today" Released: January 1971

Air Conditioning is the debut studio album by English progressive rock band Curved Air. It was released in November 1970 and reached number 8 in the UK albums chart on 30 January 1971.

On the picture disc (subsequently used as the album cover) the album title was shown as "Airconditioning", while the subsequent green label issue had it as "Air Conditioning".

== Background and recording ==
Though Sonja Kristina is credited as the sole lyricist of "It Happened Today", in a series of interviews conducted from late 1998 through March 1999, Francis Monkman claimed to have conceived the song's title and basic lyrical concept. Kristina concurred that Monkman came up with the title but asserts that the lyric "isn't really about anything specific." In contrast, though "Propositions" is credited solely to Monkman, he denies having written the lyrics and suggests that they were written by Kristina. He explained the inspiration for the song's music: "I was a great fan of Terry Riley (having played in the 1st London performance of "In C" in 1968) and was very impressed by A Rainbow in Curved Air. Then I had a kind of "musical vision" of a high-energy rock sound going into a Terry-like tape-loop improvisation. That became "Propositions"..."

Both music and lyrics for "Situations" were written jointly by Darryl Way and Rob Martin. Martin recalled that their collaboration on the song was so tight that often each melody was produced alternately by first one composer, then the other.

The lyric of "Hide and Seek" describes a post-apocalyptic scenario in which a lone survivor searches in vain for another living person; Sonja Kristina has stated that this lyric can be taken literally or symbolically. She commented, "It's a nightmare, the sort of thing when you dream about being left in an empty city."

Kristina's vocal on "Blind Man" was inspired by Donovan's performance on "Hurdy Gurdy Man".

== Picture disc ==
The album was one of the first vinyl picture discs to be produced, and it was released as a limited edition of 10,000. Picture disc technology was in its infancy and this resulted in a level of surface noise. The disc was re-issued in conventional album format (the "Green Label" edition), with a photo of the original picture disc on the album cover.

== Reception ==
Professional ratings
Review scores
Source	Rating
AllMusic	4.0/5 stars

== Track listing ==
Side one
No.	Title	Writer(s)	Length
1.	"It Happened Today"	Francis Monkman, Sonja Kristina Linwood	4:55
2.	"Stretch"	Darryl Way, Monkman	4:05
3.	"Screw"	Way, Linwood	4:03
4.	"Blind Man"	Way, Rob Martin	3:32
5.	"Vivaldi"	Way	7:26

Side two
No.	Title	Writer(s)	Length
6.	"Hide and Seek"	Way, Linwood	6:15
7.	"Propositions"	Monkman	3:04
8.	"Rob One"	Martin	3:22
9.	"Situations"	Way, Martin	6:17
10.	"Vivaldi (With Cannons)"	Way, Monkman	1:35

Bonus track on 2018 re-mastered & expanded edition
No.	Title	Writer(s)	Length
9.	"Thinking on the Floor" (recorded August 1970, previously unreleased)	Way, Linwood	3:06

2018 reissue, CD two
No.	Title	Writer(s)	Length
1.	"It Happened Today" (single version)	Francis Monkman, Sonja Kristina Linwood	3:51
2.	"What Happens When You Blow Yourself Up" (B-side of single)	Monkman, Linwood	3:35
3.	"It Happened Today (Take 9)" (recording session, Sept 1970)	Francis Monkman, Sonja Kristina Linwood	4:18
4.	"Rob One (Take 2)" (recording session, Sept 1970)	Martin	3:21
5.	"Propositions" (BBC Radio One, 10 Nov 1970)	Monkman	3:31
6.	"Vivaldi" (BBC Radio One, 10 Nov 1970)	Way	6:31
7.	"It Happened Today" (BBC Radio One, 10 Nov 1970)	Francis Monkman, Sonja Kristina Linwood	4:44
8.	"Young Mother in Style" (BBC Radio One, 5 Jan 1971)	Darryl Way, Sonja Kristina Linwood	4:07
9.	"Situations" (BBC Radio One, 5 Jan 1971)	Way, Martin	4:59
10.	"Stretch" (BBC Radio One, 27 Jan 1971)	Darryl Way, Monkman	4:39

== Personnel ==
Rob Martin left Curved Air after Air Conditioning was recorded. After this, Francis Monkman added the piano apeggios to Rob One and played bass on the new track. Francis also re-recorded bass on It Happened Today and Stretch, which were initially recorded with a very muddy bottom end.

Curved Air

- Sonja Kristina – lead vocals
- Darryl Way – electric violin and vocals
- Francis Monkman – lead guitar, organ, piano, mellotron, electric harpsichord, special effects, equipment, and VCS3 synthesizer
- Rob Martin – bass guitar
- Florian Pilkington-Miksa – drums

== Singles ==
- "It Happened Today" / "What Happens When You Blow Yourself Up" b/w "Vivaldi" (UK & The Netherlands)
- "It Happened Today" b/w "What Happens When You Blow Yourself Up" (US & Germany)
- "Vivaldi" b/w "It Happened Today" (Italy)

== Charts ==
Chart (1970–71)	Peak position
UK Albums (Official Charts)	8

Chart (2018)	Peak position
UK Progressive Albums (Official Charts)	20
