= Mike Wedgwood =

English bassist and singer (born 1950)

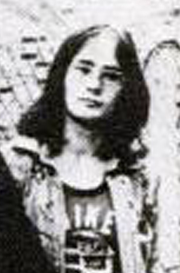

Background information
- Born: 19 May 1950 (age 76); Derby, England
- Genres: Rock
- Instruments: Bass, vocals
- Years active: 1970s–present
- Formerly of: Caravan

Mike Wedgwood (born 19 May 1950 in Derby) is an English bassist and singer. He is related to the Wedgwood family of pottery fame.

Wedgwood joined The Overlanders in 1968 following their biggest hit, a cover of The Beatles song "Michelle", and remained with them until 1971.

Following a stint with Arthur's Mother from 1971 to 1972, he joined Curved Air in 1972, and played on their third album Phantasmagoria. When the band split, he remained with Sonja Kristina and helped form the new version of the band. They recorded the album Air Cut (and four tracks that would be released in 1990 on Lovechild) before breaking up again in 1973.

After playing in Kiki Dee's backing band on Elton John's Yellow Brick Road tour in England, and recording Elton's song "Hard Luck Story", he joined Caravan, in 1974 and remained with them until 1976, playing on the albums Live at Fairfield Halls, 1974 (released by Decca in 2002, which was actually his playing debut with Caravan), Cunning Stunts and Blind Dog at St. Dunstans.

He worked with Gordon Haskell from 1993 to 1995.

Wedgwood now lives in Denmark and is gigging solo and with the Wedgwood Band, The Skriver Bjarnesen Blues Band, Stan Urban, and many others. He owns and runs Wedgwood Studio in Silkeborg.
