= Curved Air – Live =

Curved Air - Live

Live album by Curved Air
- Released: February 1975
- Recorded: 4 December 1974
- Venue: Cardiff University and Bristol Polytechnic
- Genre: Progressive rock
- Length: 47:07
- Label: BTM Records Ltd.
- Producer: David Hitchcock for BTM Records

Curved Air chronology
Air Cut (1973)	Curved Air - Live (1975)	Midnight Wire (1975)

Curved Air – Live was the first official live album by the British progressive rock band Curved Air. It was recorded on the band's reunion tour in December 1974 and released in 1975. Though it failed to enter the charts, it made enough profit to pay off the tax bill which had compelled Curved Air to reunite, allowing Francis Monkman and Florian Pilkington-Miksa to again leave the group.

== Background ==
Sonja Kristina's vocals on the album are atypical of her 1970s performances, both live and in the studio. By her own account, she was in a distraught emotional state following the breakup of her first marriage, and this provoked more wild and raw on-stage singing.

== Reception ==
Professional ratings
Review scores
Source	Rating
Allmusic	4.0/5 stars

Allmusic wrote that "Kristina herself is possibly in her best voice ever, while the instrumentation rides roughshod over the... belief that Curved Air were at their best in the studio", offering high praise to nearly all of the individual cuts while criticizing none of them.

== Track listing ==
No.	Title	Length
1.	"It Happened Today"	5:25
2.	"Marie Antoinette"	6:45
3.	"Back Street Luv"	3:43
4.	"Propositions"	7:42
5.	"Young Mother"	8:56
6.	"Vivaldi"	9:00
7.	"Everdance"	5:36

== Personnel ==
Curved Air

- Sonja Kristina – lead vocals
- Darryl Way – violin, keyboards, backing vocals
- Francis Monkman – lead guitar, organ, VCS3 synthesizer
- Florian Pilkington-Miksa – drums
- Philip Kohn – bass guitar

== Recording details ==
- Recorded live at Cardiff University and Bristol Polytechnic in December 1974 with the Manor Mobile
- Re-mixed at Air London Studios
- Produced by David Hitchcock for BTM Productions
- Recording Engineer and Re-mix engineer Django Johnny Punter
- Assistant Engineers – Phil Becque, Paul Nunn, Sean Milligan, Andy Morris and Alan Perkins
- Design and Artwork Liz Gilmore
- Photography Michael Allard for BTM design
- Special thanks to Ben Mullet and Yamaha for stage equipment
