= Midnight Wire =

Studio album by Curved Air
- Released: 1975
- Recorded: August 1975
- Studio: Ramport Studios (London)
- Genres: Progressive rock, folk rock
- Length: 35:18
- Label: BTM
- Producers: Ron and Howard Albert for FAT Productions

Curved Air chronology
Curved Air – Live (1975)	Midnight Wire (1975)	Airborne (1976)

Midnight Wire is the fifth studio album by Curved Air and was recorded in 1975. It marked another line-up change in the band, with Darryl Way and Sonja Kristina recruiting new musicians after the end of the reunion tour marked by the Curved Air - Live album. Kristina's friend Norma Tager, who had helped design the costumes she wore on stage from Curved Air's reunion in 1974 to their breakup in 1976, contributed all the lyrics to the songs.

== Background and recording ==
The album's recording was marked by intense and bitter arguments between the band and producers Ron and Howard Albert, who often vehemently criticized the band members.

== Track listing ==
=== Side one ===
1. "Woman On A One Night Stand" (Sonja Kristina, Norma Tager) – 5:06
2. "Day Breaks My Heart" (Darryl Way, Tager) – 4:38
3. "The Fool" (Way, Mick Jacques, Tager) – 4:27
4. "Pipe of Dreams" (Jacques) – 3:58

=== Side two ===
1. "Orange Street Blues" (Way, Tager) – 5:01
2. "Dance of Love" (Jacques, Way, Tager) – 4:36
3. "Midnight Wire" (Way, Tager) – 7:32

== Personnel ==
Curved Air

- Sonja Kristina – lead vocals
- Darryl Way – violin
- Mick Jacques – guitars
- Stewart Copeland – drums

Guest musicians

- John G. Perry – bass guitar
- Peter Wood – keyboards
- Derek Damain – backing vocals on "The Fool"

Technical

- Will Reid-Dick – engineer
- Bob Searles, Liz Gilmore – sleeve design

"Thanks to Beric Wickens, Carolann Nicholls, Ian Copeland, Miles Copeland, Moray McMillin, Nick Blackburn"
