= Sonja Kristina =

English singer (born 1949)

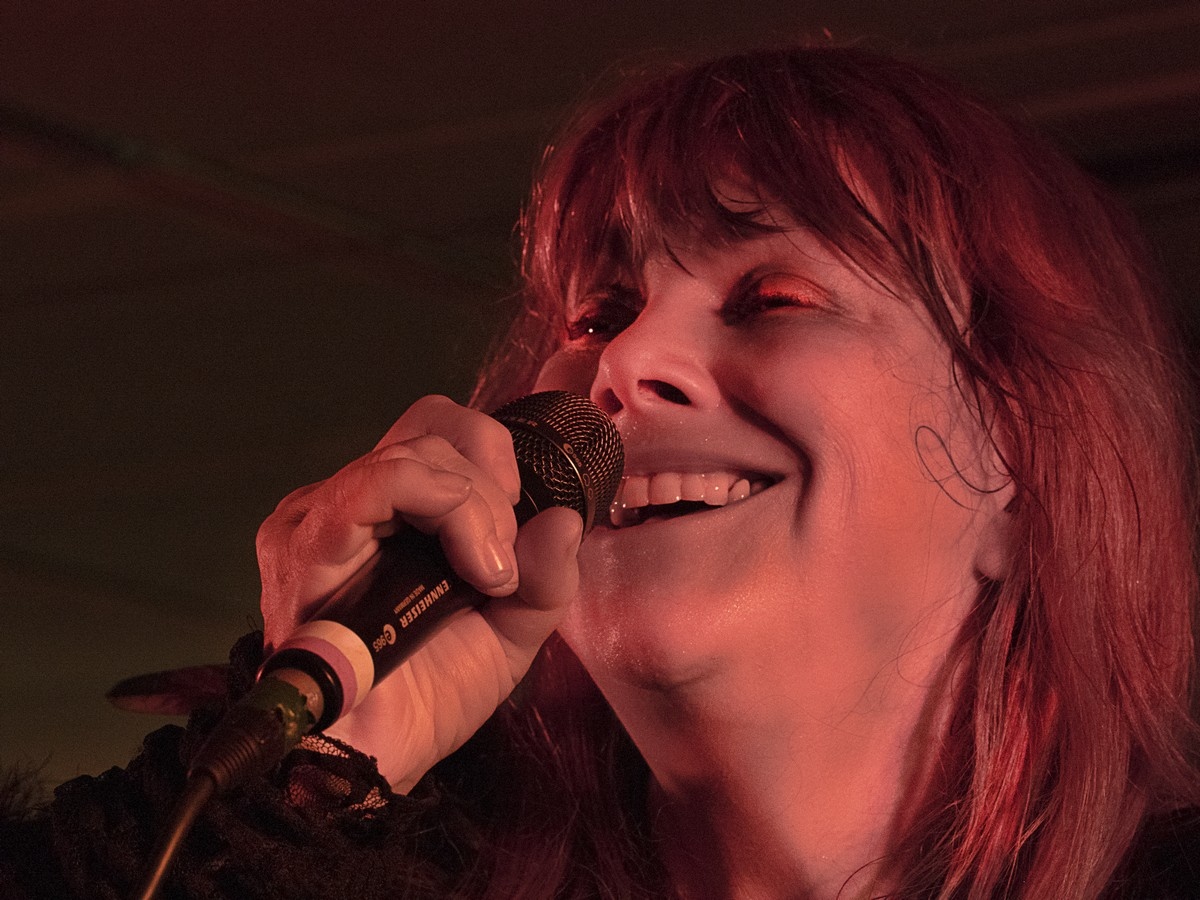
- Kristina in 2015

Background information
- Born: Sonia Christina Shaw; 14 April 1949 (age 77); Brentwood, Essex, England
- Genres: Progressive rock; folk; acid folk
- Occupation: Singer
- Instrument: Vocals
- Years active: 1960s–present
- Labels: Cherry Red; Market Square
- Member of: Curved Air
- Formerly of: The Strawbs
- Website: sonjakristina.com

Sonja Kristina (born Sonia Christina Shaw; 14 April 1949) is a British singer and songwriter, best known for starring in the original London production of the seminal 1960s musical Hair, and for being the lead vocalist of the 1970s progressive rock band Curved Air.

Kristina is also an experienced voice coach. She was the Rock, Jazz and Musical Theatre tutor for Performing Arts students at Middlesex University from 1991 to 1999.

== Biography ==
Kristina was born in Brentwood, Essex as Sonia Christina Shaw, daughter of a criminologist and maternal granddaughter of Swedish actress Gerda Lundequist.

=== Career ===
Kristina first appeared on stage at the Swan Folk Club in Romford at the age of thirteen. Her first professional gig was at a Folk Festival in Southgate, London a year or so later. By 1968, while studying at the New College of Speech and Drama, Kristina was helping to run, and performing at, the Wednesday evening sessions at London's Troubadour Folk Club. She was generally known on the folk scene as "Sonja" having previously appeared several times on the British children's TV show Song and Story under that name. Her first manager was Roy Guest of Folk Directions.

In 1968, Kristina auditioned for and won the part of "Crissy" in the London stage production of the stage musical Hair. She features on the original cast album singing the song "Frank Mills", also released as a single. She also briefly sang with The Strawbs, following the departure of Sandy Denny. Dave Cousins remembered:

"Or Am I Dreaming" (on Strawbs LP) was very much inspired by the sessions I used to do at the Troubadour with Sonja Kristina ... When Sandy left the band Sonja was going to be her replacement, but she did one show with us at a folk club in Chelmsford, and that was it. The reprise was about the magic mountain music man, which was me ... that was in the poem I wrote about her which was going to be in the book of my poems that was never released.

Cousins eventually published the book, called The Bruising of Hearts, The Losing of Races, in 1993. It included a poem "Silver Smile", written for Kristina in the late 1960s.

==== Curved Air ====
According to AllMusic, it was Galt MacDermot, who wrote the music for Hair and another musical Who the Murderer Was, who employed the four members of Curved Air as a house band, who suggested when the stage show closed that they add Kristina to the lineup. Another version has it that manager Mark Hanau had the idea Kristina's alto vocals could become a vital ingredient in a new band. On 1 January 1970, the singer received an official invitation to become a member of Curved Air. She remembered sitting backstage on the theatre stairs listening to a cassette of the band's music Hanau had given her, and being much impressed. Described by Sting as a "real beauty, otherworldly and unattainable", Kristina played a full creative role bringing with it a powerful female sexuality. Her experiences working as a croupier in the London Playboy Club during the early 1970s, reflected itself in the stage persona she later developed.

Curved Air had a changing line-up over their nine albums (1970–1976 and 1990), with Kristina being the only constant element. Since 2008, she has taken part in a series of Curved Air reunion concerts. She was romantically involved with Curved Air drummer Stewart Copeland; they were married from 1982 to 1991.

After Curved Air, she returned to Hair. She has also performed solo, including as part of the acid folk movement in London in the early 1990s, culminating in her critically acclaimed Songs from the Acid Folk in 1991, and in a multi-media duo MASK, with Marvin Ayres.

In 2008, Curved Air reformed, with other original members including Darryl Way and Florian Pilkington-Miksa and, later, Kirby Gregory from the Air Cut line up. The band continues to record and perform internationally.

Sonja Kristina has arrived on the stage. Suddenly there is no band, no stage, no college kids. Just Sonja glinting in the green light. She moves like smoke across the stage, hardly seeming to move at all, but undulating in slow motion. Who cares what the band is doing? As a muso I've never bothered with singers, considering them to be musical passengers. How wrong I've been! She's not even singing yet, and she owns everything. – Stewart Copeland

==== Theatre productions ====
Including the London version of the musical Hair (1968), Kristina has performed in numerous theatre and musical theatre productions from the early 1960s onwards, including East Lynne (1966), a lead role in Romeo and Juliet, The French Have a Song For It (1979) with Helen Shapiro, Man to Woman with Marsha Hunt (1982), and Shona

==== Television ====
- Curriculee, Curricula (BBC TV 22 May 1978) with Dave Greenslade

==== Awards ====
In 1971, Kristina received the Sounds magazine Top Female Vocalist Award, and in 2014 the 'Guiding Light Award' at the Progressive Music Awards. The award was presented by television broadcaster, and long-standing Curved Air fan, Katie Puckrik for helping pave the way for other female artists who followed, including Kate Bush, Heather Findlay, Anne-Marie Helder and others.

== Discography ==
- Hair (Original London Cast Recording) 1968

=== with Curved Air ===
- Air Conditioning (1970)
- Second Album (1971)
- Phantasmagoria (1972)
- Air Cut (1973)
- Live (1975)
- Midnight Wire (1975)
- Airborne (1976)
- The Best of Curved Air (1976) – compilation
- Lovechild (recorded 1973, released 1990)
- Live at the BBC (1995)
- Alive, 1990 (2000)
- Masters from the Vaults
- Reborn (2008)
- Retrospective (2010) – compilation including three MASK tracks
- North Star (2014)
- Tapestry of Propositions (2016)
- The Second British Rock Meeting 1972 (2018)
- Live at Under the Bridge - The 45th Anniversary Concert (2019)

=== Solo ===
- Sonja Kristina (1980)
- Songs from the Acid Folk (1991) (with TY-LOR and friends)
- Harmonics of Love (1995) (with Cloud 10)
- Cri De Coeur (2003)
- Heavy Petal CD + DVD by MASK, featuring Sonja Kristina (2005)

=== Other recordings ===
- Vampires Stole My Lunch Money by Mick Farren (1978) – Sonja Kristina and the Pretenders' Chrissie Hynde provided backing vocals on this album.
- Sheep In Wolves' Clothing Motorheadbangers fan club tribute CD (2008) – Kristina contributed an acoustic version of Motörhead's "I Don't Believe A Word."
- Narration in Alice in Wonderland by German progressive rock band Neuschwanstein. Re-released on 4 November 2022

== Personal life ==
Kristina was in a relationship with Stewart Copeland from at least 1976; they married in 1982 and had two sons. Copeland also adopted her son from a previous relationship. The couple divorced in 1991.
