= Old Habits (album) =

Unreleased studio album by Smash Mouth

Studio album by Smash Mouth
- Released: Unreleased

Old Habits was planned to be Smash Mouth's fifth studio album and was expected to be released in the summer of 2005. According to the band's official website at the time, the album was going to sound much more like ska punk, similar to Fush Yu Mang and The East Bay Sessions. In September 2005, the band performed what was tentatively going to be the album's first single, "Getaway Car", on Last Call with Carson Daly. The album was delayed many times, in the hope of gaining publicity with Steve Harwell's appearance on the reality show The Surreal Life. Smash Mouth returned to the studio intent on making their new record better; however, Old Habits was eventually shelved and most tracks were remixed and released on Summer Girl. One track also ended up on Greg Camp's solo album Defektor, while another ended up on Paul DeLisle's self-titled EP, released under the name Sub Daylights.

The full announcement on their website read:

Smash Mouth have completed their fifth record, entitled "Old Habits" and are looking at a Summer 2005 release date. Recorded at Studio 880 in Oakland, CA with producer Jeff Salzman (The Killers, The Black Keys) and mixed at Blackbird Studios in Nashville, TN by Jacquire King (Kings of Leon, Tom Waits), the new 12 song collection is fast and rockin', with an aggressive sound that harkens back to the band's multi-platinum debut "Fush You Mang" [sic]. "We haven't been this excited about a new record since "Astro Lounge", says singer Steve Harwell. Check out the Discography Page for a complete track listing

— Official Old Habits announcement, Smash Mouth Official Website (Retrieved on June 30, 2005)

The album's cover featured Greg Camp's '64 Ford Falcon Squire wagon which was also depicted on the cover of Fush Yu Mang.

== Track listing ==
(From the discography on their website as retrieved on June 30, 2005)

1. "Hey LA" (Note: Later released on Summer Girl.)
2. "Getaway Car"
3. "The Crawl"
4. "Say When"
5. "Baby Please Don't Go" (Note: Later released on Greg Camp's Defektor.)
6. "Quality Control"
7. "Old Habits" (Note: Later released on Greg Camp's The Maids of Honor.)
8. "Sugar"
9. "Beside Myself" (Note: Later released on SoundCloud)
10. "Duty Free" (Note: Later released on Paul DeLisle's Sub Daylights.)
11. "Beautiful Bomb"
12. "Never Let Me Down Again" (Depeche Mode cover)
