= Stretch (band) =

British rock band

- Origin: United Kingdom
- Genres: Blues rock, pop rock
- Years active: 1974–79, 2007–present
- Labels: Anchor, Repertoire
- Members: Kirby Gregory; Elmer Gantry; Jim Scadding; Justin Hildreth
- Past members: Paul Martinez; Craig Collinge; John Wilkinson; Jim Russell; Hiroshi Kato; Dave Evans; John Cook; Steve Emery; Jeff Rich; Nicko McBrain; Chris Mercer

"Why Did You Do It?"
"Why Did You Do It?", 1975

Stretch were a 1970s British rock band that grew from the collaboration between vocalist Elmer Gantry (real name Dave Terry) and guitarist Kirby Gregory (real name Graham Gregory). Gantry had been the frontman of Elmer Gantry's Velvet Opera, and Kirby had been a member of Curved Air.

== Formation ==
The band was put together in 1974 with help from Fleetwood Mac manager Clifford Davis and drummer Mick Fleetwood, to perform as Fleetwood Mac on a U.S. tour because the existing Fleetwood Mac were not in a position to fulfil outstanding contractual obligations. However, Fleetwood did not join the tour as planned, and later denied any knowledge or involvement, and partway through the tour it became obvious to audiences that there was no original member of Fleetwood Mac in the band, and the tour collapsed. Bass player Paul Martinez claimed, "Mick Fleetwood pulled out at the last minute claiming not to know who we were!"

== Music career ==
Stretch rose from the ashes of this debacle, and soon had a No. 16 hit single in November 1975 with "Why Did You Do It?", the lyric of which was a direct attack on Mick Fleetwood for his failure to join the band on the ill-fated U.S. tour. In the eventual video for the record, the bass player was Steve Emery who wore a traditional keffiyeh head-dress. On the original studio recording, Elmer Gantry sang the vocals, Paul Martinez was on bass, the guitarist was Kirby with Jim Russell on drums and tambourine, the single also featured electric guitar by Hiroshi Kato and horns by Bud Beadle, Chris Mercer, Mick Eve, Mike Bailey and Ron Carthy. The band followed the single up with the album Elastique, but during the recording of this album, Martinez was sacked.

Drummer Jim Russell left the band before the recording of the second album, You Can't Beat Your Brain for Entertainment, due to musical differences. He was replaced by future Status Quo drummer Jeff Rich. In 1976, Stretch served as the opening act for Ritchie Blackmore in 1976 for certain legs of the tour before being replaced by AC/DC during the European, Australian and Japanese dates. Gantry left before the last album, Forget the Past. Another blow came in 1979 when manager Davis decided to withdraw his financial input, and the band eventually split up.

In 1999, Italian DJ Gigi D'Agostino used distorted vocal samples from the first line of the song "Why Did You Do It?", in order to produce his own track "Bla Bla Bla".

Stretch reformed in 2007 to coincide with a "Greatest Hits" collection, and toured in support of the Jeff Healey Band.

In 2011, the band released the album Unfinished Business, an 11-track recording for Repertoire Records including original songs, covers and a new version of "Why Did You Do It?".

== Cover versions ==
In 2012, German producer Ferry Ultra recorded a version of "Why Did You Do It?" featuring Canadian vocalist Ashley Slater for the album Ferry Ultra and the Homeless Funkers.

== Personnel ==
Current members

- Elmer Gantry (Dave "Elmer" Terry) – lead vocals, rhythm guitar (1974–78, 2007–present)
- Kirby Gregory (Graham Gregory) – lead guitar, backing vocals (1974–79, 2007–present); lead vocals (1978–79)
- Jim Scadding – bass guitar (2007–present)
- Justin Hildreth – drums (2009–present)

Former members

- Paul Martinez – bass guitar (1974–75)
- Craig Collinge – drums (1974)
- John Wilkinson – keyboards (1974)
- Jim Russell – drums (1974–76)
- Hiroshi Kato – guitar (1974)
- John Cook – keyboards (1975)
- Dave Evans – bass guitar (1975–76)
- Steve Emery – bass guitar, backing vocals (1976–79), lead vocals (1978–79)
- Jeff Rich – drums (1976–78, 2007–09)
- Nicko McBrain – drums (1978–79)

(Note: The band that toured as Fleetwood Mac consisted of Gantry, Kirby, Martinez, Wilkinson and Collinge. The absence of a female member also contributed to audiences realising that this was not the authentic group, since Fleetwood Mac featured Christine McVie on keyboards.)

== Discography ==
=== Albums ===
- Elastique (1975) (Anchor)
- You Can't Beat Your Brain for Entertainment (1976) (Anchor)
- Lifeblood (1977) (Anchor)
- Forget the Past (1978) (Hot Wax - not the US label of the same name)
- Can't Judge a Book... The Peel Sessions (1996) (Strange Fruit)
- Stretch: The Story of Elmer Gantry (1996) (Repertoire)
- Why Did You Do It: The Best of Stretch (2007) (Repertoire)
- That's the Way the Wind Blows – A Collection (2011) (Repertoire)
- Unfinished Business (2011) (Repertoire)

=== Singles ===
Year	Title	Peak chart positions	
Year	Title	UK	AUS
1975	"Why Did You Do It"	16	92
1976	"That's the Way the Wind Blows"	—	—
1976	"Loves Got a Hold on Me"	—	—
1977	"Fixin' to Die"	—	—
1978	"Forget the Past"	—	—
"—" denotes releases that did not chart or were not released.
