= Tony Brainsby =

British publicist (1945–2000)

Tony Brainsby (1945-2000) was a British publicist of the 1960s. His career spanned over thirty years, in which time he represented several notable rock acts, including Curved Air, The Small Faces, Sonny and Cher, Thin Lizzy, Paul McCartney and Wings, Queen, Ron Wood, David Essex, Jeff Duff (as "Duffo"), as well as actress Quinn O'Hara.

Brainsby was born in Hammersmith, west London, in 1945. In his late teens he moved into a flat in Soho inhabited by Eric Clapton and Brian Jones, of The Rolling Stones. After landing a job as a columnist for Boyfriend magazine, a position which gave him access to the rehearsals for TV pop show Ready Steady Go!, he decided to set up his own publicity firm. Tony went on to become the most successful and sought after rock publicist in London.
