= Kirby Gregory =

English musician

- Also known as: Kirby
- Born: Graham Patrick Gregory; 11 March 1953 (age 73)
- Origin: Wallingford, Berkshire, England
- Genres: Rock, blues
- Instrument: Guitar
- Years active: 1969–present
- Labels: Warner Bros., Anchor, Hot Wax, Repertoire

Graham Patrick "Kirby" Gregory, often credited simply as Kirby (born 11 March 1953) is an English musician best known for playing with rock bands Curved Air and Stretch. He now works in the field of addictions counselling.

== Musical career ==
Gregory began playing guitar aged seven and moved to London in 1969 with bass guitarist Steve Emery. They formed a band called Armada, and recruited vocalist Elmer Gantry before breaking up. In 1972, Gregory joined progressive rock band Curved Air and played on their 1973 album, Air Cut. He also played on one track on the archival release, Lovechild.

After leaving Curved Air, Gregory and Gantry became part of a group of musicians who were assembled by Fleetwood Mac manager Clifford Davis, with the alleged consent of drummer Mick Fleetwood, in order to perform as Fleetwood Mac on a tour of the United States in 1974. Problems between the members of Fleetwood Mac had resulted in them being unable to fulfil their concert obligations. Fleetwood has since denied any role in recruiting the musicians. After it became clear that Fleetwood himself was not going to be involved, audiences quickly realised that this hastily assembled group was not the band they had paid to see, and the tour collapsed after a few weeks. However, Gregory and the other band members stayed together and formed Stretch later that year.

Gregory wrote the hit single "Why Did You Do It?" about the bogus Fleetwood Mac episode, for Stretch and it reached No. 16 in the UK Singles Chart in November 1975. Stretch recorded several albums before splitting up in 1979.

Gregory recorded a solo album Composition on the UK Hot Wax Records label (not the US label of the same name) in 1978, and subsequently played on ex-Fleetwood Mac guitarist Danny Kirwan's final album Hello There Big Boy! in 1979. He also took part in a recording session with Thin Lizzy vocalist Phil Lynott. Gregory and Gantry re-united briefly in 1982 and recorded material with Sweet drummer Mick Tucker and bass player Nigel Ross-Scott but nothing was officially released.

In 2007, Gregory and Gantry reformed Stretch and toured in support of the greatest hits album, Why Did You Do It: The Best of Stretch.

In 2013, Gregory rejoined Curved Air.

== Addictions counselling ==
In 1990, Gregory became involved in addictions counselling and in 1999 he joined Action on Addiction, a UK-based charity that works with people affected by drug and alcohol addiction. He is currently Director of Client Services at the charity and at its subsidiary The Spider Project, and has spoken at major conferences on addiction. He is also a Cognitive Analytic Psychotherapist and an Association of Cognitive Analytic Therapy Accredited Supervisor.
