= Air Cut =

Studio album by Curved Air
- Released: April 1973
- Recorded: January–February 1973
- Studios: Advision Studios, London
- Genres: Rock, progressive rock, folk rock
- Length: 39:59
- Label: Warner Bros.
- Producer: Martin Rushent

Curved Air chronology
Phantasmagoria (1972)	Air Cut (1973)	Curved Air – Live (1975)

Air Cut is the fourth studio album by Curved Air and was recorded in 1973, following the departure of three of the band's founding members. Only Sonja Kristina and Mike Wedgwood remained in the band from their previous album and Air Cut took them in a more rock-oriented direction.

== Reception ==
Professional ratings
Review scores
Source	Rating
AllMusic	2.5/5 stars

While offering high praise for the track "Metamorphosis", AllMusic's reaction to the album was otherwise indifferent, stating that most of the songs were straightforward rock numbers and "pictured a group trying to widen its audience without sounding convinced it was the right thing to do." It concluded that Air Cut's main point of interest is the debut of Eddie Jobson.

== Track listing ==
=== Side one ===
No.	Title	Lyrics	Music	Length
1.	"The Purple Speed Queen"	Kirby, Kristina	Kirby	3:20
2.	"Elfin Boy"	Kristina	Jobson	4:20
3.	"Metamorphosis"	Kristina	Jobson	10:30
4.	"World"	Wedgwood	Wedgwood	1:32

=== Side two ===
No.	Title	Lyrics	Music	Length
5.	"Armin" (Instrumental)	-	Jobson, Wedgwood, Kirby, Russell	3:16
6.	"U.H.F."	Kirby	Kirby	5:06
7.	"Two-Three-Two"	Wedgwood	Wedgwood	4:10
8.	"Easy"	Kristina	Kristina	6:45

== Personnel ==
Curved Air

- Sonja Kristina – lead (1–4, 6, 8) and backing (7) vocals, acoustic guitar (2)
- Eddie Jobson – electric violin, backing vocals (6), VCS3 synthesizer, mellotron, pianos, organ, harpsichord (2)
- Kirby Gregory – guitars, bass guitar (4), backing vocals
- Mike Wedgwood – bass guitar (all but 4), acoustic guitar (4), backing and lead (7, 8) vocals
- Jim Russell – drums

Additional credits

- Artwork design by Modula
- Artwork illustration based on drawing by Ian Fink
- Engineer – Paul "The Rock" Hardiman
- Photography – Mal Linwood-Ross & Mike Putland
