= Airborne (Curved Air album) =

Studio album by Curved Air
- Released: 1976
- Recorded: Spring 1976
- Studio: Trident Studios (London)
- Genres: Progressive rock, folk rock
- Length: 39:40
- Label: BTM
- Producers: Dennis MacKay, Curved Air

Curved Air chronology
Midnight Wire (1975)	Airborne (1976)	Lovechild (1990)

Airborne is the sixth studio album by Curved Air and was recorded in 1976. Like their last few releases, it was not a significant commercial success. After a follow-up non-album single, "Baby Please Don't Go" b/w "Broken Lady", the group disbanded. Drummer Stewart Copeland went on to form The Police, while violinist Darryl Way and lead singer Sonja Kristina both pursued solo careers. Bassist Tony Reeves and guitarist Mick Jacques both later became members of the semiprofessional band Big Chief.

The Police covered "Kids to Blame" in early performances, using a stripped-down punk arrangement of the song. Stewart Copeland also reused a guitar riff from "Desiree" in his solo single as Klark Kent, "Don't Care".

== Background and recording ==
The album sessions marked the debut of Stewart Copeland as a songwriter. Around the release of Midnight Wire, he was informed about publishing royalties for songwriters, and responded by churning out compositions until the band accepted a few of his contributions.

Producer Dennis McKay quit the project midway through recording, leaving the remaining four tracks to be produced by Curved Air themselves.

== Reception ==
Professional ratings
Review scores
Source	Rating
Allmusic	2.5/5 stars

Allmusic described Airborne as an overlooked record and "a strong summation of all that made the group so important in the first place." While appraising the album as a whole as weaker than their first three, claiming it veers towards generic 1970s rock, they regarded "Desiree" and "Heaven (Never Seemed So Far Away)" as equal to anything on the band's strongest releases.

== Track listing ==
Music and lyrics credits per original issue on BTM records.

Side one
No.	Title	Lyrics	Music	Length
1.	"Desiree"	Stewart Copeland, Sonja Kristina	Mick Jacques, Stewart Copeland	3:12
2.	"Kids to Blame"	Norma Tager	Copeland	3:19
3.	"Broken Lady"	Kristina	Tony Reeves	3:13
4.	"Juno"	Darryl Way	Darryl Way	3:23
5.	"Touch of Tequila"	Kristina	Jacques, Reeves	3:49

Side two
No.	Title	Lyrics	Music	Length
6.	"Moonshine"	Way	Way	11:36
7.	"Heaven (Never Seemed So Far Away)"	Copeland, Stuart Lyons	Copeland	3:18
8.	"Hot and Bothered"	Tager	Jacques	2:53
9.	"Dazed"	Way	Way	4:17

Bonus track on CD issues
No.	Title	Lyrics	Music	Length
10.	"Baby Please Don't Go"	Big Joe Williams	Big Joe Williams	2:31

== Personnel ==
Curved Air

- Sonja Kristina – vocals
- Darryl Way – violin, keyboards
- Tony Reeves – bass, keyboards, double bass on "Broken Lady"
- Stewart Copeland – drums "heavy artillerie"
- Mick Jacques – guitars

Guest musicians

- Robin Lumley – piano on "Broken Lady"
- Alan Skidmore – saxophone on "Hot & Bothered"
- Henry Lowther – trumpet on "Hot & Bothered"
- Frank Ricotti – congas
- Jack Emblow – accordion on "Broken Lady"
- Bob Sargeant – organ on "Desiree" and "Kids to Blame"

Additional credits

- Tracks 3–5, 7, and 8 produced by Dennis McKay
- Tracks 1, 2, 6, and 9 produced by Curved Air
- Track 10 produced by Tony Reeves
- Nick Bradford – engineer
