= Ozalid (trademark) =

Process of printing positive images on paper

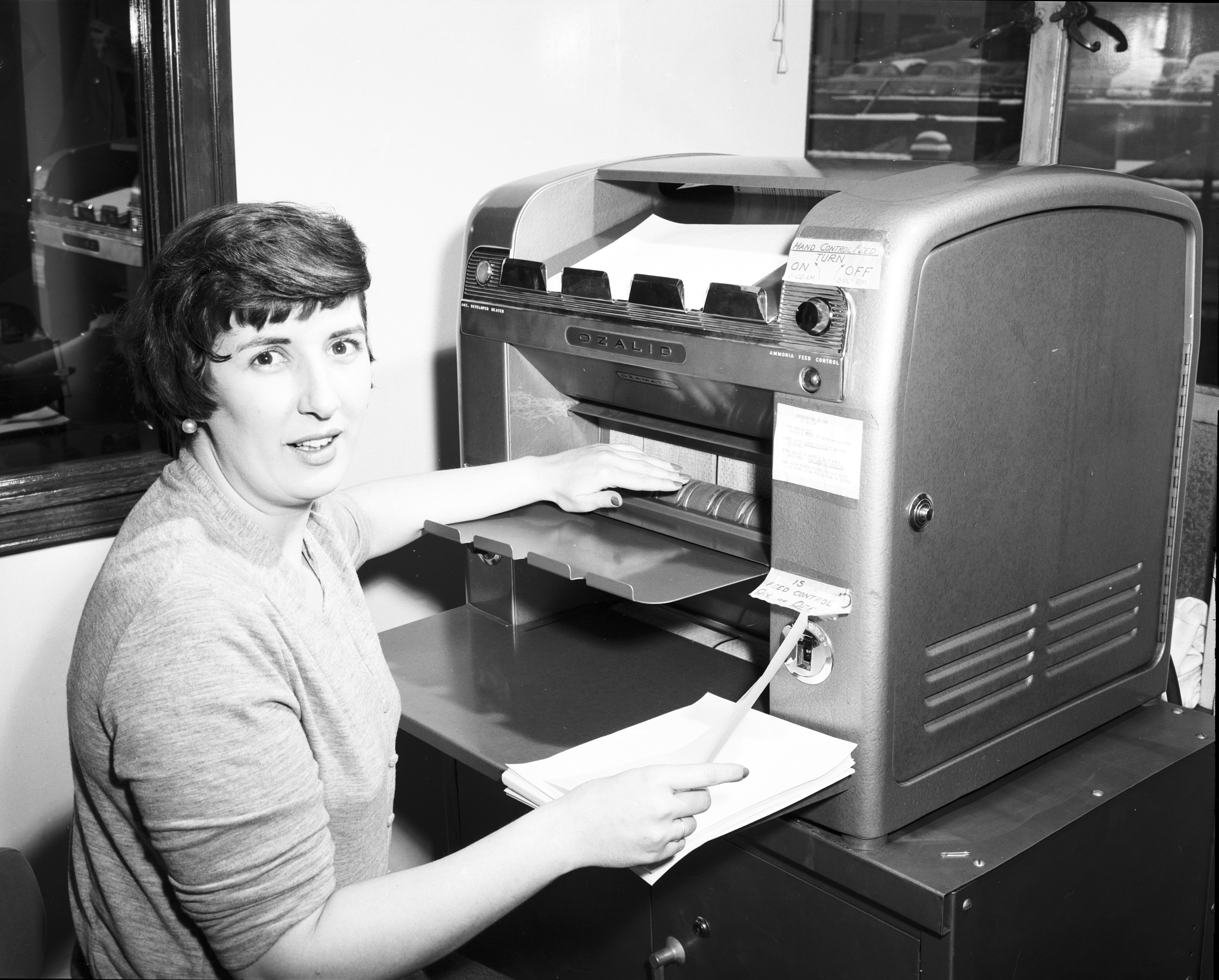
Ozalid machine in use with the City of Seattle, City Light office, circa 1954.

Ozalid is a registered trademark of a type of paper used for "test prints" in the monochrome classic offset process. The word "Ozalid" is an anagram of "diazol", the name of the substance that the company "Ozalid" used in the fabrication of this type of paper.

== Overview ==
OZALID was first federally registered in the United States as a trademark on February 5, 1929 as a brand for light-sensitive copying and photographic papers. The registration currently is owned by R.Q.O. Holding Company, Inc. of New York, and is related to the even earlier registration of October 11, 1923 in what is now the Federal Republic of Germany. The R.Q.O. Holding Company also owns a United States trademark registration for OZALID for "copying and reprographic machines, apparatus and parts thereof."

However, compound "Ozalid Process" appears never to have been registered as a trademark, and the use of OZALID specifically for the Ozalid process using diazo compound paper is not currently registered as a trademark at least in the United States. OZALID as a mark for "machines for diazo type prints" was first registered in the United States in 1938 and is now expired. Similarly, another registration for the use of OZALID for Light-Sensitive Diazotype Papers, Cloths, Films, etc., Machines for Photoprinting Thereon, Machines for Developing the Photoprints Thus Produced and Parts of Such Machines was first registered in the United States in 1942, and also has expired.

Accordingly, OZALID may have become descriptive of the Ozalid process, and no longer uniquely associated with any one source, at least in the United States. Trademark rights, may, however, continue in the United States on a state registration or common law unregistered basis, even after a federal registration expires.

== The Ozalid process ==
The Ozalid process is a process of printing positive images on paper from patterns on film or other translucent media. Its objective is the creation of a photogram, using chemically treated paper.

A transparent film with the pattern to be printed is placed on a diazo compound coated paper. This sandwich is exposed to ultraviolet light. After a 15 sec to 5 min exposure, ammonia vapours are used to develop the film image onto the paper.

Its main use was for making copies of electrical, mechanical and civil engineering drawings. It is still used widely in developing countries. It is also used for proofing, as it produces an image very close to the finished work.

This process produces a blue or black image on a white paper. It is a monochromatic copying process.
