= Defektor =

Studio album by Greg Camp
- Released: September 9, 2008
- Genre: Rock
- Label: Bar/None

Defektor is a solo album released by Greg Camp. It was released on September 9, 2008, during Camp's time away from Smash Mouth. The editorial staff of AllMusic Guide gave the album three out of five stars.

== Track listing ==
1. "Introduktion" – 1:05
2. "The Maid" – 4:09
3. "Cat's Game" – 4:03
4. "Zombies on Parade" – 4:07
5. "Gina Marie" – 3:17
6. "Wanna Go for a Ride" – 3:35
7. "The Armageddon Slide" – 3:14
8. "Baby Please Don't Go" – 2:57
9. "Rot with You" – 3:35
10. "Killer Bees" – 3:38
11. "Beautiful Disaster" – 2:55
12. "Deaf" – 3:34
13. "This Is Good, Right?" – 4:02
14. "Defektor" – 3:16
