= A Rainbow in Curved Air =

Studio album by Terry Riley
- Released: 1969
- Recorded: 1968
- Genres: Minimalism; electronic; psychedelia; ambient
- Length: 40:17
- Label: CBS Records
- Producer: David Behrman

Terry Riley chronology
| In C (1968) | A Rainbow in Curved Air (1969) | Church of Anthrax (1970) |

Reissue cover
- 1990 CD release cover, based on elements from the LP back cover.

Professional ratings
Review scores
| Source | Rating |
|---|---|
| AllMusic | 5/5 stars |
| Pitchfork | 9.1/10 |
| Rolling Stone | (favourable) |
| The Village Voice | A− |

A Rainbow in Curved Air is the third album by the American composer Terry Riley, released in 1969 on CBS Records. The title track consists of Riley's overdubbed improvisations on several keyboard and percussion instruments. The B-side "Poppy Nogood and the Phantom Band" is a saxophone-based drone piece featuring tape loops and edits, drawing on Riley's all-night improvisatory performances in the 1960s.

Riley's record deal with CBS was part of "Music of Our Time," a short-lived album series on American experimental music helmed by CBS employee David Behrman, who had also facilitated the release of Riley's 1968 album In C; these two were the most successful LPs in the series. The album subsequently influenced a number of rock and electronic productions.

== Background ==
In the late 1960s, composer David Behrman was working for CBS Records's Columbia imprint as an editor when he visited Terry Riley in his New York apartment, witnessing his use of tape loops as accompaniment for his saxophone playing (achieved via the use of two Revox tape recorders running into one another). Riley had previously used this tape loop approach for productions such as Music for The Gift (1963). In 1967, Behrman had received permission from CBS to curate a series of albums on the American experimental music scene titled "Music of Our Time," which would eventually include recordings by Steve Reich, Pauline Oliveros and Richard Maxfield. The first of Riley's releases on CBS was a 1968 recording of In C; the second would be A Rainbow in Curved Air. The latter was an early recording at CBS to utilize a professional eight-track recorder.

== Music ==
The largely improvisational nature of the work, based on modal scales, owes much to Riley's background in jazz improvisation and interest in Hindustani classical music. Jazz pianist Bill Evans, one of Riley's piano "heroes", had utilized overdubbing on his album Conversations with Myself five years earlier. Riley would intensify this overdubbing approach with added instrumentation. Using overdubbing, Riley plays all the instruments on the title track: electric organ, two electric harpsichords (a Baldwin electric harpsichord & a RMI Rock-Si-Chord), dumbec, and tambourine. The piece moves through several sections; following the opening theme and introduction of "placid chords," Riley introduces "an explosion, a procession of right-hand lines that flutter and pirouette over the pulsing rhythmic patterns." The calmer second half of the recording features shorter, high-register keyboard lines which syncopate with the music's modal base.

The B-side of the original LP is titled "Poppy Nogood and the Phantom Band." It is a saxophone-based drone piece featuring tape loops and jump cuts. The piece is a version of the performances given at Riley's "All-Night Flight" concerts in the late 1960s. It employs overdubbing and tape delay, with Riley again playing all instruments. Riley's saxophone playing on the track was inspired by that of John Coltrane. The titular "Phantom Band" refers to Riley's tape delay accompaniment. A note on the album explains that "The spatially separated mirror images were adapted for studio recording by Glen Kolotkin and resemble the sound Terry gets in his all-night concerts."

== Release and legacy ==
The original LP jacket includes a idealistic poem on the back cover, written by Riley, depicting a world in which the Pentagon is "turned on its side and painted purple, yellow & green within a plainly psychedelic environment" and "the concept of work was forgotten."

The album received a favorable review in Rolling Stone. Writing for The Village Voice, critic Robert Christgau opined that the title track "has to be a fair approximation of the music of the spheres."

The album inspired Mike Oldfield's Tubular Bells and Pete Townshend's organ parts on The Who's "Won't Get Fooled Again" and "Baba O'Riley," the latter named in tribute to Riley and Meher Baba. It also inspired English progressive rock band Soft Machine's instrumental piece "Out-Bloody-Rageous". A Rainbow in Curved Air has also had a significant impact on the developments of minimalism, ambient music, jazz fusion, new-age music, progressive rock, and subsequent electronic music. It foreshadows the later overdubbed instrumental works composed by Steve Reich. The English progressive rock band Curved Air named itself after this album.

The album was remastered and reissued by Esoteric Recordings in 2012.

== Appearances ==
Some of the music on this album was used as the background accompaniment of The Guide in the original BBC Radio 4 series of The Hitchhiker's Guide to the Galaxy by Douglas Adams.

It was sampled/copied as the sound effects for the 1980 arcade game Moon Cresta.

On April 26, 2007, Riley gave a live performance of A Rainbow in Curved Air (Revisited) with percussionist William Winant and keyboardist Mikhail Graham.

The album's title track is also featured in the 2008 video game Grand Theft Auto IV on the in-game radio station "The Journey."

In 2009 the track "Poppy Nogood and the Phantom Band" was featured in the BBC documentary Prog Rock Britannia: An Observation in Three Movements.

== Track listing ==
All compositions by Terry Riley.

1. "A Rainbow in Curved Air" – 18:39
2. "Poppy Nogood and the Phantom Band" – 21:38

== Personnel ==
Credits adapted from liner notes.

- Terry Riley – electric organ, electric harpsichord, Rocksichord, dumbec, tambourine, saxophone
- David Behrman – producer
- Glen Kolotkin – engineer, technician
- Roy Segal – engineer
- John Berg – artwork, front cover montage
- Virginia Team – back cover
