= Darryl Way =

English rock and classical musician (born 1948)

- Born: Richard Darryl Way; 17 December 1948 (age 77); Taunton, Somerset, England
- Genres: Progressive rock; folk; acid folk; classical
- Occupations: Songwriter; musician
- Instruments: Violin; keyboards
- Years active: 1968–present
- Label: Cherry Red Records
- Formerly of: Curved Air

Richard Darryl Way (born 17 December 1948 in Taunton, Somerset, England) is an English rock and classical musician who was a founding member of the progressive rock band Curved Air and co-writer of their albums from 1970 to 1976. He is best known as a violinist but also plays keyboards.

== Early life ==
Way began his musical training at Dartington College of Arts, and later studied at the Royal College of Music.

== Career ==
Way met Francis Monkman and they formed the band Sisyphus, which evolved into Curved Air.

After three albums and a hit single with Curved Air, Way left in 1972 and formed the band Darryl Way's Wolf, which also recorded three albums before splitting. His next band, Stark Naked & the Car Thieves, went on hiatus when Curved Air reformed in late 1974. After their Curved Air – Live album, the band split, only to be reformed by Way primarily using members of Stark Naked & the Car Thieves. He recorded two studio albums with this new incarnation of the group before leaving again.

Way played on two tracks on Jethro Tull's 1978 album Heavy Horses. He then went on to release several solo albums, including Concerto for Electric Violin, which premiered on The South Bank Show with the Royal Philharmonia Orchestra in 1978. There was a subsequent performance at Leeds Town Hall in the early 1980s which was broadcast live on BBC Radio Leeds.

Curved Air reunited briefly in 1990 and a live recording of their reunion concert was released in 2000.

In November 1996, Way's opera, The Russian Opera, premiered at The Place Theatre in London, and his songwriting work includes music set to lyrics by Steven Berkoff.

In 2008, Way took part in a series of Curved Air reunion concerts.

== Discography ==
=== With Curved Air ===
- Air Conditioning (1970) including Vivaldi
- Second Album (1971) on which he co-wrote their sole charting hit Back Street Luv
- Phantasmagoria (1972)
- Live (1975)
- Midnight Wire (1975)
- Airborne (1976)
- Renegade b/w We're Only Human (1984)
- Live At The BBC (1995)
- Alive, 1990 (2000)

=== With Darryl Way's Wolf ===
- Canis Lupus (1973)
- Saturation Point (1973)
- Five in the Morning b/w Bunch of Fives (1973)
- Night Music (1974)
- Darryl Way's Wolf (compilation from Canis Lupus and Saturation Point) (1974)

=== With Trace ===
- Birds (1975)

=== With Pierre Moerlen's Gong ===
- Expresso II (1978)

=== With Jethro Tull ===
- Heavy Horses (1978)

=== Solo ===
- Concerto for Electric Violin (1978) - Francis Monkman synthesizes an orchestra
- Little Plum b/w Sweet Dreams (1982) - produced by Martin Gordon for Snat Records
- As Long as There's a Spark... (1983) - EP
- Little Plum (remix) b/w Love Is The Driver (1984)
- Edge of the World (1984)
- The Human Condition: Suite for String Orchestra, Piano and Percussion (1987)
- Under the Soft (1991)
- Classical Rock (music for TV and Film) (2010)
- Ultra Violins (2013)
- Children Of The Cosmos (2014)
- Myths, Legends And Tales (2016)
- Vivaldi's Four Seasons In Rock (2018)
- Destinations (2019)
