= Francis Monkman =

English composer (1949–2023)

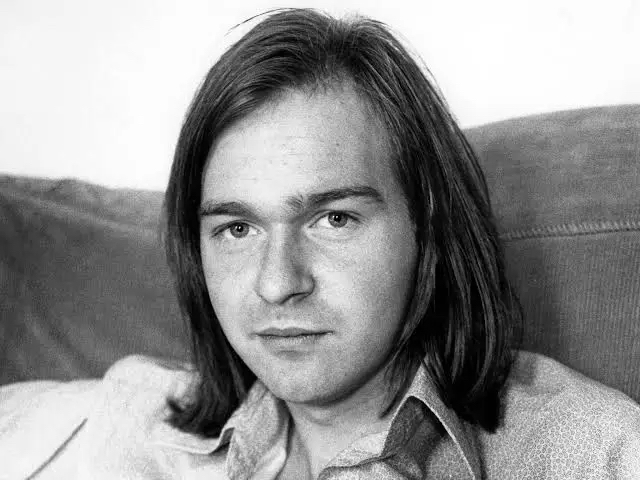
- Monkman in 1970s

Background information
- Born: Anthony Francis Keigwin Monkman; 9 June 1949; Hampstead, London, England
- Died: 12 May 2023 (aged 73)
- Genres: Progressive rock; classical music
- Occupations: Songwriter; musician; film score composer
- Instruments: Keyboards; guitar
- Years active: 1960s–2023
- Formerly of: Curved Air; Sky; 801; Matching Mole

Anthony Francis Keigwin Monkman (9 June 1949 – 12 May 2023) was an English rock, classical and film score composer, and a founding member of both the progressive rock band Curved Air and the classical/rock fusion band Sky.

== Life and career ==
=== Early years ===
Francis Monkman was the son of Kenneth Monkman, an authority on the writer Laurence Sterne, and his wife Vita (née Duncombe Mann). He was a pupil at Westminster School, where he studied organ and harpsichord, later studying at the Royal Academy of Music, winning the Raymond Russell prize for virtuosity on the harpsichord and becoming a member of the Academy of St Martin in the Fields. Wanting to experiment with more spontaneous music forms, Monkman learned how to play guitar and began to associate himself with rock music.

=== Curved Air ===
In the late 1960s Monkman co-founded the rock band Sisyphus, which evolved into the pioneering band Curved Air. Monkman played on their first three albums, doubling on keyboards and guitar and exploring his interest in jamming, overtones, natural harmonies and freer aspects of musicality. With group violinist Darryl Way, Monkman also contributed the bulk of the band's composing, although he and Way rarely collaborated. Differences of opinion with Way ultimately led to Monkman's departure from the band following the release of Phantasmagoria (1972). Curved Air singer Sonja Kristina has commented that "(Francis likes) jamming ... real 'out there' cosmic rock jamming. And that is not Darryl at all ... He's a very disciplined perfectionist, he likes things to be as precise and exquisite as possible. Whereas Francis is completely the opposite way; he just wants to play and things just come out of the cosmos". Monkman returned briefly to Curved Air for a 1974 tour intended to pay off the group's outstanding tax bill, which resulted in the release of the 1975 concert album Live, but departed again at the end of the tour.

=== Session years ===
After leaving Curved Air, Monkman contributed to the Renaissance album Prologue (1972), worked with Al Stewart, contributing to the album Past, Present and Future (1973) as well as with Lynsey de Paul on her Surprise album, and toured with the Shadows on their 20 Golden Greats Tour (1977). Also in 1977, he collaborated with Phil Manzanera and Brian Eno on the project 801. In 1978, he played all keyboards on Brian Bennett's solo album Voyage and during the summer contributed to Kate Bush's Lionheart album.

=== Sky and soundtracks ===
In 1978, Monkman became a member of classical/rock music fusion band Sky alongside guitarists John Williams and Kevin Peek, bass player Herbie Flowers and drummer/percussionist Tristan Fry. His keyboard work with Sky included extensive classical or classically inspired harpsichord playing (highlighted on the band's electric version of Bach's "Toccata", which reached number 5 in the UK singles chart, and secured Sky a Top of the Pops appearance), piano, and a variety of synthesizer approaches including progressive rock complexity and psychedelic drones.

During his time with Sky, Monkman was arguably the band's most prolific composer and arranger. For their debut album, he wrote the non-hit single "Cannonball" and the 20-minute long second-side composition "Where Opposites Meet" (which was intended to combine and display the band's diverse influences). On their second album, he performed a version of Jean-Philippe Rameau's "Gavotte & Variations" as an absolutely straight classical solo harpsichord rendition (further cementing the place of classical music in the band's repertoire) and composed a second side-long twenty-minute long-form composition ("FIFO", for which the title and musical structure was inspired by computer data processing, and on which Monkman also played distorted psychedelic guitar alongside the more formal parts performed by Peek and Williams).

During his time with Sky, Monkman had continued to release solo recordings which mingled original composition with film and television soundtracks and library music. His 1978 album Energism included the electronic "Achievements of Man", from which extracts were used as the theme to the BBC programme Think Again. He also composed the piece "Current Affairs", used by Channel 4 as the introduction to Engineering Announcements, provided by the IBA. He would also become known as a synthesizer demonstrator on programs such as the BBC's Tomorrow's World.

In 1980, Monkman's soundtrack to the British film The Long Good Friday was so successful that he opted to leave Sky. He had also become disenchanted with the band's developing direction: in an interview nineteen years later, he recalled:

there seemed to emerge (from where?) a need for Sky to re-invent itself, come the third album, as a 'true' MOR outfit. The seeds had been effectively sown with Herbie's piece 'Scipio' on the second album. (Without wishing to air personal grievances, I think I could say that I always felt this piece, which I refused point blank ever to play live, was motivated by a 'look, anyone can write a long piece' attitude). So, clearly outvoted in the dash for mediocrity that the third album, for me, represents, I quit.

In the same interview, Monkman mentioned having been approached again by Sky in "the late '80s" to compose "another long piece, in the manner of "Opposites" and "Fifo." The first movement of this work (which I determined to call "Another Dish for the Roof") exists in demo form... The other three movements were planned, but scarcely sketched."

=== Solo ===
Post-Sky, Monkman intended to concentrate mostly on television and soundtrack work (although at around the same time, he resumed performances of classical harpsichord music).

In 1981, Monkman released an art/progressive rock album called Dweller on the Threshold. This was the first album on which he had sung lead vocals; it also featured Camel's Andy Latimer (guitar) and former Whitesnake drummer Dave Dowle, as well as singers Graham Layden and Julia Rathbone.

Monkman's planned film score career was ultimately unsuccessful. In 1999, he reflected:

I feel somewhat short-changed on this one, as I always felt certainly after the success of 'The Long Good Friday', that I was something of a natural film composer. Possibly a little too good, you know? (After all, no director really wants the composer telling his own version of the story, right?) I did one more film for John McKenzie (director of 'LGF') called 'The Innocent', about a boy with epilepsy. It's very low-key, but worth seeing, I guess. After 'LGF,' Zoetrope (Coppola's studio) became interested for a while, but in response to a request for 'examples of my work,' I sent them a copy of 'Dweller on the Threshold' and, unsurprisingly I suppose, heard no more.

In the mid-1980s, Monkman had several reunions with Darryl Way (relating to the latter's Elektra Ensemble work, performing "amplified classical music". This included live shows (including the Glastonbury Festival classical tent) performing pieces such as "(the) Bach Concerto in D minor, Mozart Sonatas, Vivaldi, I did Beethoven's 'Pathetique' in a sort of fortepiano sound, on synth. All good stuff." In 1986, Monkman and Way joined forces with their original Curved Air inspiration Terry Riley, to perform the latter's "In C" at Sadlers Wells Theatre, although plans for a follow-up mini-tour of Italy fell through.

In 1990 Monkman returned to Curved Air for a one-off reunion concert at London's Town & Country alongside Sonja Kristina, Darryl Way and Florian Pilkington-Miksa (a recording of the concert was released a decade later on the Alive, 1990 album). Three-fifths of Curved Air's original lineup – Monkman, Pilkington-Miksa, and bass guitarist Rob Martin – jammed together in a set of 1991 session at the instigation of guitarist Mike Gore, the results eventually surfacing on Monkman's Jam album in 2002. In 2008, Monkman briefly rejoined Curved Air for yet another relaunch, but his time with the band was once again short-lived due to creative differences with Darryl Way, and he left the band during the early rehearsal sessions.

After a 20-year break, Monkman started to release further solo albums again at the start of the 21st century, beginning with 2001's 21st Century Blues.

Monkman died from cancer on 12 May 2023, at the age of 73.

== Instruments ==
Monkman played guitar as well as keyboards in Curved Air, switching between them when playing live. According to the sleeve notes for the second Sky album, Sky 2, he also played additional guitar parts on his composition "FIFO", alongside John Williams and Kevin Peek.

Keyboards

- 1977–1978: (tour with The Shadows)

Piano

== Discography ==
- Contemporary Impact (With Malcolm Ironton) (1978) (KPM Music, Denmark Street 21, London)
- Energism (1978) (Bruton Music Limited, London)
- Tempus Fugit (1978) (Bruton Music Limited, London)
- Pictures in the Mind (With Malcolm Ironton) (1978) (KPM Music, Denmark Street 21, London)
- Classical Concussion (1979) (KPM Music, Denmark Street 21, London)
- Predictions (Part 1) (1979) (KPM Music, Denmark Street 21, London)
- Predictions (Part 2) (1979) (KPM Music, Denmark Street 21, London)
- Classical Odyssey(1980) (KPM Music, Denmark Street 21, London)
- Dynamism (1980) (Bruton Music Limited, London)
- The Long Good Friday Soundtrack (1981) (Nimbus Custom) Recorded at CTS Studios 12, 18 and 20 December 1979.
- Dweller on the Threshold (1981) (Maya Records)
- 21st Century Blues (2001)
- Jam (2003)
- A Harpsichord Sampler (2003)
