= Florian Pilkington-Miksa =

British musician (1950–2021)

- Born: Florian Pilkington-Miksa; 3 June 1950
- Origin: Paddington, London, England
- Died: 20 May 2021 (aged 70)
- Genres: Rock, progressive rock
- Occupations: Musician, sculptor
- Instrument: Drums
- Years active: 1960s–2021

Florian M. Pilkington-Miksa (3 June 1950 – 20 May 2021) was an English rock drummer and a sculptor. He was best known as a member of both the original and reformed lineups of Curved Air. He also performed with Kiki Dee.

Pilkington-Miksa died in May 2021 after several bouts of pneumonia, at the age of 70.
