= D.S. Al Coda =

Studio album by National Health
- Released: 1982
- Recorded: October–November, 1981
- Genres: Jazz fusion, progressive rock, Canterbury scene
- Length: 46:14
- Label: Blueprint Records / Floating World
- Producers: National Health, Nick Bradford

National Health chronology
Of Queues and Cures (1978)	D.S. Al Coda (1982)

D.S. Al Coda is the third and final album by the progressive rock and jazz fusion group National Health. It is a tribute to former member Alan Gowen, who died of leukaemia in May 1981, and consists solely of compositions written by him. Most of these had not been recorded in the studio before, although "TNTFX" and "Arriving Twice" both appeared earlier on albums by Gowen's other band Gilgamesh.

== Track listing ==
All tracks are written by Alan Gowen.

No.	Title	Length
1.	"Portrait Of A Shrinking Man"	5:35
2.	"TNTFX"	3:12
3.	"Black Hat"	4:52
4.	"I Feel A Night Coming On"	6:37
5.	"Arriving Twice"	2:22
6.	"Shining Water"	8:52
7.	"Tales Of A Damson Knight"	1:56
8.	"Flanagan's People"	5:18
9.	"Toad Of Toad Hall"	7:30

== Personnel ==
National Health

- Dave Stewart - Synthesizer, organ, electric piano
- Phil Miller - Electric guitar, acoustic guitar
- John Greaves - Bass guitar
- Pip Pyle - Drums, electronic drums

Additional musicians

- Elton Dean - Saxello (1, 4)
- Ted Emmett - Trumpet (1)
- Barbara Gaskin - Vocals (7)
- Jimmy Hastings - Flute (3, 6, 9)
- Amanda Parsons - Vocals (7)
- Richard Sinclair - Vocals (3)
- Annie Whitehead - Trombone (1)
