= Live 1990 (Hatfield and the North album) =

Live album by Hatfield and the North

Live album by Hatfield and the North
- Released: November 28, 1993
- Recorded: March 30, 1990
- Venues: Nottingham, Nottinghamshire, England
- Genres: Progressive rock, Canterbury scene
- Length: 57:43
- Label: Demon

Hatfield and the North chronology
Afters (1980)	Live 1990 (1993)	Hatwise Choice: Archive Recordings 1973-1975, Volume 1 (2005)

Professional ratings
Review scores
Source	Rating
AllMusic	2/5 stars

Live 1990 is a 1993 live album released by a reformed line-up of Canterbury scene band Hatfield and the North. This marked the band's first manifestation since its 1975 break-up. Original keyboard player Dave Stewart declined to take part and was replaced by French jazz pianist Sophia Domancich, at the time a member of drummer Pip Pyle's band Equip'Out. This line-up's activity was limited to this one appearance on Central TV's "Bedrock" series. In addition to a number of tracks from the band's classic repertoire, a large part of the concert was devoted to more recent material. This was to be Hatfield's swan song until the 2005–06 reformation.

== Track listing ==
1. "Share It" (Sinclair, Pyle)
2. "Shipwrecked" (Pyle)
3. "Underdub" (Miller)
4. "Blott on the Landscape" (Domancich)
5. "Going for a Song" (Sinclair, Pyle)
6. "Cauliflower Ears" (Pyle)
7. "Halfway Between Heaven and Earth" (Sinclair)
8. "5/4 Intro" (Sinclair)
9. "Didn't Matter Anyway" (Sinclair)

== Personnel ==
Musicians

- Sophia Domancich – keyboards
- Phil Miller – guitar
- Richard Sinclair – bass, vocals
- Pip Pyle – drums

Production

- Will Ashurst – executive producer
- Duncan Smith – executive producer

Recorded in Nottingham, 30 March 1990. This was taken from a video shoot at a TV studio that also hosted a Gong Reunion around the same time.
