= Neil's Heavy Concept Album =

Studio album by Neil Wheedon Watkins Pye
- Released: 1984
- Recorded: 1982–1983
- Genre: Comedy
- Length: 41:37
- Label: WEA International
- Producer: Dave Stewart

Professional ratings
Review scores
Source	Rating
Allmusic	4.5/5 stars

Neil's Heavy Concept Album is a 1984 recording of songs and spoken comedy routines by British actor Nigel Planer, in character as the long-suffering hippie Neil from the BBC comedy series The Young Ones. Production, arrangements and keyboards are by Canterbury scene keyboardist Dave Stewart, who also plays guitar, bass and drums. Other players on the album include ex-members of bands Gong, Spooky Tooth and Level 42.

== Concept ==
The front of the album sleeve is a loose parody of The Rolling Stones' Their Satanic Majesties Request album sleeve. The rear parodies the Beatles' Sgt. Pepper's Lonely Hearts Club Band, with Neil wearing different outfits replacing the images of the four Beatles, and the text "A heavy time is guaranteed for all." replacing "A splendid time is guaranteed for all."

The album followed the success of the Neil single "Hole in My Shoe" — a cover version of Traffic's 1967 hit – which reached number 2 in the United Kingdom.

The album starts with a spoken apology ("Hello Vegetables") in which Neil says the album was "a hassle to make and there's much too much technology and commercial stuff on it". Additional spoken tracks include Neil having a conversation with a potato in a sewer, reciting a poem to his rubber plant Wayne ("your roots are in the ground, my roots are in Twickenham"), and experiencing a flashback in the track "Paranoid Remix" which features Beatles-esque backwards noises and voices, and ends with a parody of the last chord from "A Day in the Life". A parody horror movie commercial, which sees vegetarian Neil being turned into a carnivorous monster after accidentally eating a hamburger leads into the original Planer composition "Lentil Nightmare", a dark heavy metal number that commences as a pastiche of the eponymous title track of Black Sabbath's debut album Black Sabbath and which subsequently quotes briefly from King Crimson's "The Court of the Crimson King" and features Planer singing in an uncharacteristic wailing, high falsetto. In the disco/rap number "Bad Karma in the UK", Neil's mother (played by musician Barbara Gaskin) admonishes him to watch his I Ching, chew his food eleven times, and remember his expectorant. "God Save the Queen" is performed as a cabaret number by a bad American standup comic who sounds identical to the American "comedian" Dino, also played by Planer, in The Young Ones episode Bomb.

== Track listing ==
Side One
No.	Title	Writer(s)	Length
1.	"Hello Vegetables"	Nigel Planer	0:26
2.	"Hole in My Shoe" (Traffic cover)	Dave Mason	3:40
3.	"Heavy Potato Encounter"	Planer, D. L. Stewart	0:42
4.	"My White Bicycle" (Tomorrow cover)	Keith West, Ken Burgess	3:31
5.	"Neil the Barbarian" (narrated by Nigel Planer's brother Roger)	Planer, Stewart	1:12
6.	"Lentil Nightmare" (narrated by Stephen Fry)	Rik Mayall, Simon Brint, Rowland Rivron; additional music by Stewart	5:47
7.	"Computer Alarm"	Planer	0:36
8.	"Wayne"	Planer, Nick Revell	1:36
9.	"The Gnome" (Pink Floyd cover)	Syd Barrett	2:29
10.	"Cosmic Jam"	Stewart, Brint, Rivron	2:26

Side Two
No.	Title	Writer(s)	Length
1.	"Golf Girl" (Caravan cover) (featuring Dawn French as a not-so-nice fairy godmother)	Pye Hastings, Richard Coughlan, David Sinclair, Richard Sinclair	4:40
2.	"Bad Karma in the UK"	Planer, Rivron, Brint	2:17
3.	"Our Tune"	Planer, Stewart	1:13
4.	"Ken"	Planer	0:41
5.	"The End of the World Cabaret"	Planer	1:09
6.	"No Future (God Save the Queen)" (Sex Pistols cover)	Sex Pistols	2:12
7.	"Floating"	Stewart	1:39
8.	"Hurdy Gurdy Man" (Donovan cover – as covered by Steve Hillage)	Donovan	3:46
9.	"Paranoid Remix" (incorporating "Hole in my Shoe")	Stewart, Planer, Barbara Gaskin, Ted Hayton, Mason	1:59
10.	"The Amoeba Song (From 'A Very Cellular Song')" (Incredible String Band cover, from The Hangman's Beautiful Daughter)	Mike Heron	1:19

The European cassette version of the album is very similar but features the track "Cassette Jam" following "Cosmic Jam" where Neil, realising that the comedy of peanut butter coming around on the LP will not work on the cassette version, attempts to redo the track for cassette with an impression of the album being tangled on tape, followed by "Brown Sugar", in which Neil discovers some buskers performing the track by The Rolling Stones, assumes the song is about whole foods and joins in with them. After "The Amoeba Song", it features two additional tracks: "Go Away", where Neil tries to explain the album has finished, and the B-side of "Hole In My Shoe", titled "Hurdy Gurdy Mushroom Man". These tracks did not appear on the Australian release of the cassette. All four cassette bonuses were included on the 2014 CD reissue on Esoteric Recordings.

There is a title inconsistency on the listing of track 19. The LP lists "Paranoid Remix" but the vinyl cover has "Paranoia Remix".

There was a 12-inch version of "My White Bicycle" released which featured an "Extended Mix" on the A-side and a "Christmas Rip-Off Mix" on the B-side.

== Personnel ==
As listed and described on sleeve notes:

=== Horrible Electric Musicians ===
- Bryson Graham – heavy metal drummer
- Gavin Harrison – flash studio drummer
- Pip Pyle – drunken cabaret drummer
- Jakko Jakszyk – heavy and psychedelic guitarist
- Dave Stewart – keyboardist, heavy metal bassist, useless drummer and fifties guitarist
- Rick Biddulph – cabaret bass & Rickenbacker 12 string

=== Beautiful Acoustic Musicians ===
- Jimmy Hastings – flute, saxophone and piccolo
- Annie Whitehead – trombone
- Barbara Gaskin – backing vocals
- Ted Hayton – backing vocals on "Hole in My Shoe"
- Rick Biddulph – 12 string guitar
