= The National Health =

The National Health may refer to:

- The National Health (play), a 1969 British play written by Peter Nichols
  - The National Health (film), the 1973 movie adaptation of the play
- The National Health (album), a 2012 album by English band Maxïmo Park
- National Health, an English progressive rock band associated with the Canterbury scene
  - National Health (album), their debut album, 1978
- "National Health", a song by the Kinks from their 1979 album Low Budget

== See also ==
- National Health Service
