= The Best of Caravan – Canterbury Tales =

Canterbury Tales: The Best of Caravan

Greatest hits album by Caravan
- Released: 1976, 1994
- Genre: Progressive rock
- Label: Decca/Chronicles

Caravan chronology
Cool Water (1994)	Canterbury Tales: The Best of Caravan (1976)	The Battle of Hastings (1995)

Professional ratings
Review scores
Source	Rating
AllMusic	4.5/5 stars

Canterbury Tales: The Best of Caravan is the 1976 compilation album released by Caravan. It was expanded, repackaged and released in 1994.

== Track listing ==
Original release
No.	Title	Music	Length
1.	"If I Could Do It All Over Again, I'd Do It All Over You"	Coughlan, Hastings, Sinclair, Sinclair	03:07
2.	"Aristocracy"	Coughlan, Hastings, Sinclair	03:03
3.	"For Richard"	Coughlan, Hastings, Sinclair, Sinclair	17:05
4.	"Nine Feet Underground/Nigel Blows a Tune/Love's a Friend/Make It 76/Dance of the Seven Paper Hankies/Hold Grandad by the Nose/Honest I Did!/Disassociation/100% Proof"	Coughlan, Hastings, Sinclair, Sinclair	22:42
5.	"Golf Girl"	Coughlan, Hastings, Sinclair	05:00
6.	"Hoedown"	Coughlan, Hastings, Sinclair, Sinclair	03:20
7.	"The Love in Your Eye/to Catch Me a Brother/Subsultus/Debouchement/Tilbury K"	Coughlan, Hastings, Sinclair, Sinclair	12:32
8.	"Memory Lain, Hugh Headloss"	Hastings	09:23
9.	"Virgin on the Ridiculous"	Coughlan, Hastings, Sinclair, Sinclair	07:57
10.	"The Dog, the Dog, He's at It Again"	Hastings	05:58

1994 2CD rerelease
No.	Title	Music	Length
1.	"Place of My Own"	Coughlan, Hastings, Sinclair, Sinclair	04:04
2.	"Magic Man"	Coughlan, Hastings, Sinclair, Sinclair	04:04
3.	"Hello, Hello"	Coughlan, Hastings, Sinclair, Sinclair	03:47
4.	"If I Could Do It All over Again, I'd Do It All over You"	Coughlan, Hastings, Sinclair, Sinclair	03:07
5.	"And I Wish I Were Stoned/Don't Worry"	Coughlan, Hastings, Sinclair, Sinclair	08:18
6.	"Can't Be Long Now/Francoise/For Richard/Warlock"	Coughlan, Hastings, Sinclair, Sinclair	14:25
7.	"Love to Love You (And Tonight Pigs Will Fly)"	Coughlan, Hastings, Sinclair, Sinclair	03:06
8.	"Golf Girl"	Coughlan, Hastings, Sinclair, Sinclair	05:01
9.	"Nine Feet Underground"	Coughlan, Hastings, Sinclair, Sinclair	22:41
10.	"Songs and Signs"	Miller	03:38
11.	"The World Is Yours"	Coughlan, Hastings, Sinclair	03:37
12.	"Memory Lain Hugh"	Hastings	04:52
13.	"Headloss"	Hastings	04:22
14.	"The Dog The Dog, He's at It Again"	Hastings	05:57
15.	"Be All Right/Chance of a Lifetime"	Hastings	06:35
16.	"L' Auberge du Sanglier/A Hunting We Shall Go/Pengola/Backwards/A Hunting We Shall Go (Reprise)"	Hastings, Perry, Ratledge	10:04
17.	"The Love in Your Eye [Live]"	Coughlan, Hastings, Sinclair	12:12
18.	"For Richard [Live]"	Coughlan, Hastings, Sinclair, Sinclair	14:13
19.	"Stuck in a Hole"	Hastings	03:09
20.	"Lover/No Backstage Pass"	Wedgwood, Hastings	09:39
21.	"The Show of Our Lives"	Sinclair, Murphy	5:44

Notes: "For Richard" is the shortened name of "Can't Be Long Now/Francoise/For Richard/Warlock". The track that appears on the 1976 release of Canterbury Tales was recorded at Fairfield Halls in 1974. The CD issue replaces this version with the two other previously released versions: the original studio recording from If I Could Do It All Over Again, I'd Do It All Over You (1970), and a live version from Caravan and the New Symphonia (1974).

== Personnel ==
- Pye Hastings – vocals, guitar
- Geoff Richardson – viola
- David Sinclair – keyboards
- Steve Miller – keyboards
- Richard Sinclair – bass
- John G. Perry – bass guitar, vocals, percussion
- Richard Coughlan – drums, percussion, timpani

== Releases information ==
Year	Type	Label	Catalog #
1976	LP	Decca	81/82
1976	LP	Decca	DK-R 8/2
1994	CD	Decca/Chronicles	515522
