= Of Queues and Cures =

Studio album by National Health
- Released: December 1978
- Recorded: July 1978
- Studio: Ridge Farm Studio
- Genre: Progressive rock
- Length: 52:02
- Labels: Charly Records; Esoteric Recordings (reissue)
- Producer: Mike Dunne

National Health chronology
National Health (1978)	Of Queues and Cures (1978)	D.S. Al Coda (1982)

Of Queues and Cures (also identified as Of Queues & Cures) is the second album recorded by the progressive rock group National Health.

== Reception ==
Professional ratings
Review scores
Source	Rating
AllMusic	4.5/5 stars

The editors of AllMusic awarded the album 4 1/2 stars, and reviewer Dave Lynch praised the album's "complexity and quirkiness," writing: "Of Queues and Cures is one of the last and finest examples of the instrumental Canterbury sound on record during the 1970s."

John Kelman of All About Jazz stated that "there's a strength about the new line-up that makes its short-lived duration all the more unfortunate," and praised "The Bryden Two-Step (For Amphibians), Pt. 1," noting: "Episodic in construction, with more things going for its nine minutes than most entire albums have, it's brighter, more committed and more powerfully played than... anything on the group's first effort."

In his book 1,000 Recordings to Hear Before You Die, Tom Moon listed the album as a suggested follow-up to Robert Wyatt's Rock Bottom.

== Track listing ==
No.	Title	Writer(s)	Length
1.	"The Bryden Two-Step (For Amphibians), Pt. 1"	Dave Stewart	8:54
2.	"The Collapso"	Stewart	6:19
3.	"Squarer for Maud"	John Greaves	11:51
4.	"Dreams Wide Awake"	Phil Miller	8:50
5.	"Binoculars"	Pip Pyle	11:45
6.	"Phlâkatön"	Pyle	0:09
7.	"The Bryden Two-Step (For Amphibians), Pt. 2"	Stewart	5:31
8.	"Paracelsus (Excerpt)" (bonus track)
9.	"The Apocalypso" (bonus track)

== Personnel ==
- Dave Stewart - organ and electric piano (tracks 1–5, 7), piano (tracks 1–3, 7), minimoog (tracks 3–5, 7)
- Phil Miller - electric guitar (tracks 1–5, 7)
- John Greaves - bass guitar (tracks 1–5, 7), piano innards (track 3), crooning (track 5)
- Pip Pyle - drums (tracks 1–5, 7), breakage (track 2), percussion (track 3), handclaps (track 3)

Also:

- Selwyn Baptiste - steel drums (track 2)
- Rick Biddulph - bass guitar during 6/4 organ solo (track 4)
- Peter Blegvad - spoken word excerpt (track 3)
- Georgie Born - cellos (tracks 1, 3, 5, 7)
- Mike Dunne - engineer, producer
- Brian Gaylor - engineer
- Jimmy Hastings - clarinets (tracks 3, 5), bass clarinet (track 3), flute (track 5)
- Phil Minton - trumpet (track 1), trumpets (track 5)
- Paul Nieman - trombones (tracks 1, 5)
- Keith Thompson - oboe (tracks 3, 5)
