= Caravan of Dreams (band) =

British progressive rock band

Caravan of Dreams were a British progressive rock band from the Canterbury scene. Led by Richard Sinclair, it evolved from the short-lived Going Going.

== Going Going ==
Sinclair (vocals, bass) and Hugh Hopper (bass), both mainstays of the Canterbury scene, had played together in the Wilde Flowers 25 years previously. They were re-united in a band with Mark Hewins (guitar-synth), Andy Ward (drums, with whom Sinclair had played in Camel) and Vince Clarke (percussion, from the late 1970s RSVP line-up with Sinclair). Sinclair has said that they almost persuaded fellow former Wilde Flowers member Kevin Ayers to join too, "but he was busy with recording work."

Billed as Hugh Hopper & Friends, the band debuted at the Canterbury festival on 10 June 1990. Three further shows follow in October/November (with Clarke only playing the first). The name Going Going was chosen as they were supporting (an offshoot of) Gong, thus "Going, Going... Gong" as a pun on the phrase "going, going, gone".

The set list for the later shows was:

- "Where But For Caravan Would I"
- "In The Land Of Grey And Pink"
- "Keep On Caring"
- "Led It Lay" (a Hewins instrumental)
- "We Did It Again"
- "Miniluv"
- "Going For A Song"
- "Hope For Happiness"

== Caravan of Dreams ==
Sinclair had also joined a Caravan reunion in 1990, which inspired him to form a new band to play his material with two fellow members of Going Going. Caravan of Dreams was launched in 1991 as a trio with Sinclair (bass, vocals), Hewins (guitar) and Ward (drums). They played live twice that year.

Hewins left the band, busy with other projects, and Sinclair and Ward were joined by Rick Biddulph (a former roadie for Sinclair's earlier band Hatfield and the North) on bass, with Sinclair switching to guitar. Based around these three, the band continued until 1993, often joined by former Caravan members Dave Sinclair and Jimmy Hastings. An example set list from 27 April 1993 (with just R. Sinclair, Biddulph and Ward) is: "In The Land Of Grey And Pink", "Only The Brave/Plan It Earth", "Share It", "Videos", "Heather", "Keep On Caring", "Emily", "Felafel Shuffle", "Going for a Song", "Back to Front", "Cruising", "Halfway Between Heaven and Earth", "It Didn't Matter Anyway", "Golf Girl".

On their first album, Caravan of Dreams (1992), the band consisted of Richard Sinclair (guitar, vocals, bass on studio tracks), Dave Sinclair (keyboards), Jimmy Hastings (flute, saxophone), Andy Ward (drums), Rick Biddulph (live bass), Michael Heupel (flute) and Alan Clarke (harmonica). A double live album followed: An Evening Of Magic (1993), recorded in Italy.

Latterly in 1993, Sinclair moved on to his RSVP album project and the band broke up. Ward and Biddulph went on to join the Camel and Caravan spin-off Mirage.

== Richard Sinclair's Caravan ==
In the autumn of 1993, a new band toured, billed as Richard Sinclair's Caravan and initially consisting of Richard Sinclair, Hugh Hopper and two drummers, Andy Ward and Dave Cohen. Hopper was only able to make the first show on the tour, leaving the other three to continue as a trio.

== Discography ==
Year	Artist	Title
1992	Caravan of Dreams	Richard Sinclair's Caravan of Dreams
1993	Caravan of Dreams	An Evening of Magic
