= Shortwave (disambiguation) =

Shortwave may refer to:

Science

- Shortwave radio
  - Shortwave radio receiver
  - Shortwave listening
  - List of shortwave radio broadcasters
- Shortwave (meteorology)
- Shortwave radiation

Music

- Short Wave Live, the only album by Short Wave, a Canterbury scene band
