= Afters (album) =

Compilation album by Hatfield and the North
- Released: 1980
- Recorded: 1973–1975
- Genres: Progressive rock, Canterbury scene
- Length: 47:03
- Label: Virgin
- Producer: Hatfield and the North

Hatfield and the North chronology
The Rotters' Club (1975)	Afters (1980)	Live 1990 (1993)

Professional ratings
Review scores
Source	Rating
AllMusic	4/5 stars

Afters is a 1980 compilation album (LP only) by the English Canterbury scene rock band Hatfield and the North. Of the sixteen tracks, eleven are taken from the band's two studio albums Hatfield and the North and The Rotters' Club, three are live recordings, and the two remaining songs are the A- and B- sides of their 1974 single "Let's Eat (Real Soon)" / "Fitter Stoke Has a Bath".

== Track listing ==
Tracks 1 and 2 were released as the A- and B-sides respectively of a 1974 single released on Virgin Records. Tracks 3, 4, 5, 10, 11, 15 and 16 are songs from The Rotters' Club, tracks 6 to 9 inclusive are from Hatfield and the North, and tracks 12 to 14 inclusive are edited recordings of live performances in France, mixed by Peter Wade:

1. "Let's Eat (Real Soon)" – 3:14
2. "Fitter Stoke Has a Bath" – 4:33
3. "Mumps [edited]" – 8:14
4. "Share It" – 3:02
5. "Lounging There Trying" – 3:15
6. "The Stubbs Effect" – 0:23
7. "Big Jobs (Poo Poo Extract)" – 0:45
8. "Going Up to People and Tinkling" – 2:17
9. "Calyx" – 2:46
10. "(Big) John Wayne Socks Psychology on the Jaw" – 0:43
11. "Chaos at the Greasy Spoon" – 0:23
12. "Halfway Between Heaven and Earth" – 6:08
13. "Oh, Len's Nature! [aka Nan True's Hole]" – 2:00
14. "Lything and Gracing" – 3:48
15. "Prenut" – 3:55
16. "Your Majesty Is Like a Cream Donut (Loud)" – 1:37

== Personnel ==
Hatfield and the North

- Dave Stewart – keyboards
- Richard Sinclair – bass, vocals
- Phil Miller – guitar
- Pip Pyle – drums, noise

Additional musicians

- Jimmy Hastings – flutes (2-15), saxophone (16)
- Lindsay Cooper – oboe, bassoon (10)
- Tim Hodgkinson – clarinet (10)
- Mont Campbell – French horn (10-11)
- Barbara Gaskin – backing vocals (2-3-15-16)
- Amanda Parsons – backing vocals (2-3-15-16)
- Ann Rosenthal – backing vocals (2-3-15-16)
- Robert Wyatt – voice (9)
