= Waterloo Lily =

Studio album by Caravan
- Released: 19 May 1972
- Recorded: November 1971
- Studio: Tollington Park Studios, London, England
- Genre: Progressive rock; Canterbury scene; jazz rock
- Length: 40:06
- Label: Deram
- Producer: David Hitchcock

Caravan chronology
| In the Land of Grey and Pink (1971) | Waterloo Lily (1972) | For Girls Who Grow Plump in the Night (1973) |

Professional ratings
Review scores
| Source | Rating |
|---|---|
| AllMusic | 4/5 stars |

Waterloo Lily is the fourth album by Caravan, released in 1972 on the Deram label.

== Background ==
The album cover is detail from "The Tavern Scene" from A Rake's Progress by William Hogarth. The track "The Love in Your Eye" has been featured as a Caravan live track for many years.

== Recording ==
Waterloo Lily is the only album by Caravan with Steve Miller (brother of Phil Miller) as the keyboard player. Miller brought a more jazz-focused sound to the album than had been heard on the previous album through his stylings on the Wurlitzer piano rather than the Hammond organ favored by previous keyboardist Dave Sinclair. Guests Phil Miller and Lol Coxhill from Steve Miller's previous band Delivery play on "Nothing at all", an instrumental modeled after Miles Davis's "Right Off". Soon after Waterloo Lily, Richard Sinclair and Steve Miller left Caravan to play with Phil Miller and Coxhill in a re-formed Delivery, which led to the formation the band Hatfield and the North.

== Track listing ==
All compositions by Coughlan, Hastings, Sinclair except "It's Coming Soon" and "Songs and Signs" by Miller.

Side one
| No. | Title | Length |
|---|---|---|
| 1. | "Waterloo Lily" | 6:47 |
| 2. | "Nothing at All" "It's Coming Soon" "Nothing at All (Reprise)" | 10:25 |
| 3. | "Songs and Signs" | 3:39 |

Side two
| No. | Title | Length |
|---|---|---|
| 4. | "Aristocracy" | 3:03 |
| 5. | "The Love in Your Eye" "To Catch Me a Brother" "Subsultus" "Debouchement" "Tilbury Kecks" | 12:31 |
| 6. | "The World Is Yours" | 3:40 |

Bonus tracks on 2001 CD rerelease
| No. | Title | Length |
|---|---|---|
| 7. | "Pye's June Thing" | 2:58 |
| 8. | "Ferdinand" | 2:57 |
| 9. | "Looking Left, Looking Right" | 5:37 |
| 10. | "Pye's Loop" | 1:21 |

== Personnel ==
Caravan

- Pye Hastings – guitars & vocals
- Steve Miller – Wurlitzer electric piano, grand piano, Hammond organ, electric harpsichord
- Richard Sinclair – bass & vocals
- Richard Coughlan – drums

Additional personnel

- Lol Coxhill – soprano saxophone (1, 2)
- Phil Miller – second lead guitar (2)
- Jimmy Hastings – flute (5)
- Mike Cotton – trumpet (5)
- Barry Robinson – oboe (5)
