= In Cahoots =

British progressive rock band, formed 1982

In Cahoots was a Canterbury scene band led by guitarist Phil Miller, their main composer.

== History ==
The band was formed in November 1982 by Miller with Pip Pyle (drums), Richard Sinclair (bass) and Elton Dean (saxophone), as the Phil Miller Quartet. It was expanded to a quintet and given its definitive name when Peter Lemer (keyboards) joined in early 1983. Miller and Pyle had been working together in National Health and had been in Hatfield and the North with Sinclair before that, while Pyle and Dean were longstanding collaborators too, recently having worked together in the Weightwatchers (with pianist Keith Tippett) and Soft Heap. Early in 1985, Hugh Hopper replaced Sinclair. The band appeared on Miller's first solo album, Cutting Both Ways (released 1987).

In 1987, Steve Franklin replaced Lemer, and in 1988 Fred Baker replaced Hopper. This line-up appeared on Miller's solo album Split Seconds, while In Cahoots Live 86-89 was released in 1989 (released under the name Phil Miller/In Cahoots like all their albums). In 1990, Franklin left and the band was joined by Jim Dvorak on trumpet. Baker and Lemer appeared on Miller's Digging In (1991), which also had programmed drums by Pip Pyle.

In 1991, Miller and Pyle were reunited with Hopper in Short Wave. In Cahoots continued with a Japanese tour, including Lemer, documented on Live in Japan (1993). The next studio effort, Recent Discoveries, was recorded in 1993. Lemer rejoined the band in 1995 and they recorded Parallel (1996) and Out of the Blue (2001), which saw Caravan guitarist Doug Boyle sitting in on two tracks (he also took part in a brief European tour that year).

In 2002, Mark Fletcher replaced Pyle and the line-up of Miller, Fletcher, Dean, Dvorak, Baker and Lemer released All That in 2003. In 2004, Dean and Dvorak left and, since then, the brass section consists of Simon Picard on tenor sax, Simon Finch on trumpet, and occasionally Gail Brand on trombone. Former Short Wave collaborator Didier Malherbe, however, was the featured saxophonist on Miller's latest effort, 2006's Conspiracy Theories, which also included guest spots by Richard Sinclair, Dave Stewart and Doug Boyle.

== Discography ==
- 1991: Live 86-89 (Mantra Records)
- 1993: Live In Japan (Crescent Discs)
- 1994: Recent Discoveries (Crescent Discs)
- 1996: Parallel (Crescent Discs)
- 2001: Out Of The Blue (Crescent Discs)
- 2003: All That (Cuneiform Records)
- 2007: Conspiracy Theories (Crescent Discs)
- 2011: Mind Over Matter (Crescent Discs)

== Filmography ==
- 2015: Romantic Warriors III: Canterbury Tales (DVD)

== Sources ==
- Official website
- Calyx - the Canterbury scene website
- Family tree
