= The Rotters' Club =

The Rotters' Club may refer to:

- The Rotters' Club (album), a 1975 album by the Canterbury scene band Hatfield and the North
- The Rotters' Club (novel), a 2001 novel by Jonathan Coe
- The Rotters' Club (TV series), a 2005 television adaptation of the novel starring Rebecca Front
