= Cool Water (album) =

Studio album by Caravan
- Released: 17 October 1994
- Recorded: 1977
- Genre: Progressive rock
- Length: 52:18
- Label: Pony Canyon
- Producer: Julian Gordon Hastings

Caravan chronology
BBC Radio 1 Live in Concert (1991)	Cool Water (1994)	The Best of Caravan – Canterbury Tales (1994)

Professional ratings
Review scores
Source	Rating
AllMusic	3.0/5 stars

Cool Water is the eleventh album by English progressive rock band Caravan, released in 1994. It is a compilation of old recordings, including their unreleased second Arista album shelved in 1978.

== Track listing ==
All songs written by Pye Hastings

1. "Cool Water" – 4:07
2. "Just the Way You Are" – 3:43
3. "Tuesday Is Rock and Roll Nite" – 4:21
4. "The Crack of the Willow" – 5:35
5. "Ansaphone" – 4:59
6. "Cold Fright" – 5:21
7. "Side By Side" – 4:40
8. "You Won’t Get Me Up in One of Those" – 3:54
9. "To the Land of My Fathers" – 4:56
10. "Poor Molly" – 5:54
11. "Send Reinforcements" – 4:48

== Personnel ==
- Pye Hastings – acoustic guitar, guitars, arrangements, vocals
- Jan Schelhaas – organ, piano, keyboards, Minimoog (tracks 1–7)
- Richard Sinclair – bass guitar (tracks 1–7)
- Richard Coughlan – drums, percussion (tracks 1–7)
- Rod Edwards – keyboards (tracks 8–11)
- Jimmy Hastings – saxophone (tracks 8–11)
- John Gustafson – bass (tracks 8–11)
- Ian Mosley – drums (tracks 8–11)
- Produced by Julian Gordon Hastings, son of Pye Hastings
- Recorded by John Burns and Maurice Haylett

== Release information ==
- 1994: CD Pony Canyon PCCY-00613
- 1995: CD Magnum America 7
- 1998: CD Castle 18
- 2002: CD Sanctuary 335
- 2003: CD Classic Rock Legends 1007
