= Back to Front (Caravan album) =

Studio album by Caravan
- Released: July 1982
- Recorded: November 1981–January 1982
- Studios: Oak Studios, Herne Bay, Kent
- Genres: Progressive rock, Canterbury scene
- Length: 42:53
- Label: Kingdom
- Producer: Caravan

Caravan chronology
The Album (1980)	Back to Front (1982)	BBC Radio 1 (1991)

Professional ratings
Review scores
Source	Rating
AllMusic	3/5 stars

Back to Front is the tenth album by English progressive rock band Caravan, released in 1982. Back to Front featured the original lineup of Richard Coughlan, Pye Hastings, Richard Sinclair and David Sinclair after 1971's In the Land of Grey and Pink and is the last studio album to feature that lineup.

== Track listing ==
Side one
No.	Title	Writer(s)	Length
1.	"Back to Herne Bay Front"	Richard Sinclair	5:55
2.	"Bet You Wanna Take It All / Hold On, Hold On"	Pye Hastings	5:20
3.	"A.A. Man"	Richard Sinclair	5:02
4.	"Videos of Hollywood"	John Murphy, Dave Sinclair	5:11

Side two
No.	Title	Writer(s)	Length
1.	"Sally Don't Change It"	Dave Sinclair	4:06
2.	"All Aboard"	Hastings	4:08
3.	"Taken My Breath Away"	Hastings	4:52
4.	"Proper Job / Back to Front"	Dave Sinclair	8:19

== Personnel ==
Caravan

- Pye Hastings – lead vocals (tracks A2, B2–4), guitar; guitar solo (track B4)
- Dave Sinclair – piano, organ, Minimoog and Prophet synthesizers; lead vocals (track B1)
- Richard Sinclair – lead vocals (tracks A1, A3 & A4), bass guitar; guitar solo on "A.A. Man" (track A3)
- Richard Coughlan – drums and percussion; talking voice (track B4)

Additional personnel

- Saxophone solos by Mel Collins
- Recorded by Graeme Quinton-Jones and Jeremy Darby

== Release information ==
- LP Kingdom 5011 (1982)
- CD Eclectic 1010 (2004 remaster)
- CD Eclectic 230448 (2005 remaster)
