= Phil Miller =

English progressive rock/jazz guitarist (1949–2017)

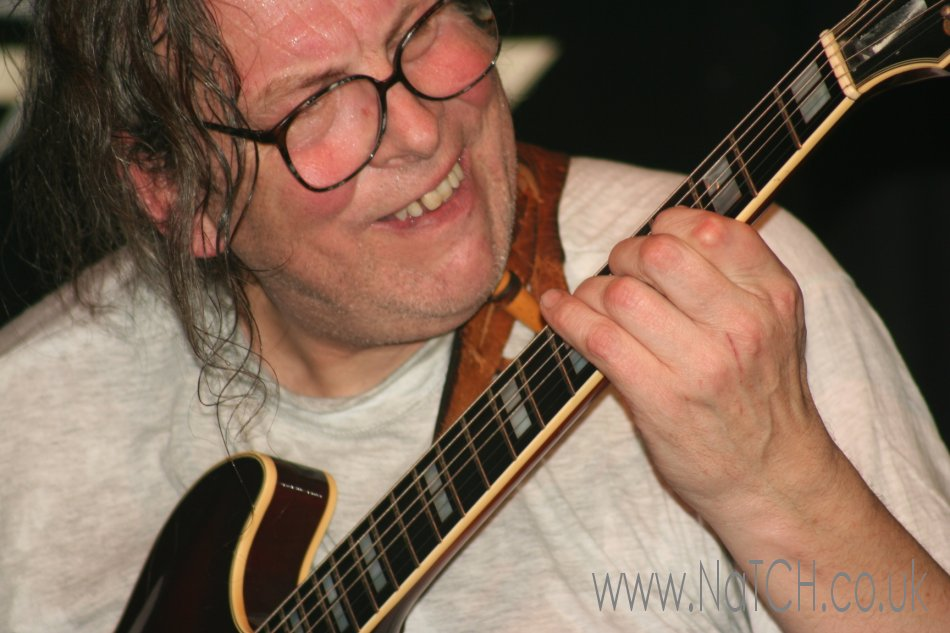
- Miller at The Vortex, London, October 2006

Background information
- Born: Philip Miller; 22 January 1949; Barnet, Hertfordshire, England
- Died: 18 October 2017 (aged 68)
- Genres: Jazz rock; progressive rock; experimental
- Occupation: Musician
- Instrument: Guitar

Philip Paul Brisco Miller (22 January 1949 – 18 October 2017) was an English progressive rock composer and guitarist and a central part of the Canterbury scene.

== Biography ==
Miller was born in Barnet, Hertfordshire. Self-taught on guitar, he formed his first band, Delivery, at age 17, which backed blues musicians playing at Ronnie Scott's Jazz Club in London. In the 1970s, he was a founding member of Matching Mole, Hatfield and the North and National Health.

In 1982, Miller formed his own band In Cahoots to play his own compositions. In the years between 1982 and 2011, he wrote 64 compositions for In Cahoots. His time, during these years, was mainly spent composing, rehearsing, recording and touring with this band. During its lifetime they recorded and contributed to ten of his records, toured extensively in the UK and Europe and played concerts in the US and Japan.

In later years he was a member of Short Wave (with Hugh Hopper, Pip Pyle, and Didier Malherbe), while continuing In Cahoots with Richard Sinclair, Elton Dean, Peter Lemer, and Pip Pyle. In 2005 and 2006, Miller toured with a re-united Hatfield and the North. Miller also performed and recorded extensively in solo projects.

Miller died on 18 October 2017 in London from cancer.

== Discography ==
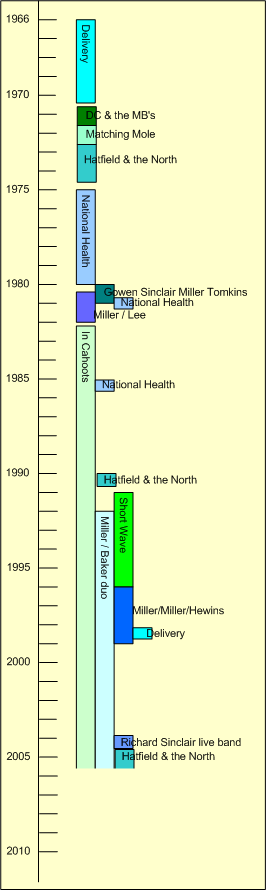
Bands and collaborations that Miller played in (1966–2005)

Year	Artist	Title
1970	Carol Grimes & Delivery	Fools Meeting
1972	Caravan	Waterloo Lily
1972	Matching Mole	Matching Mole
1972	Matching Mole	Little Red Record
1973	Coxhill/Miller	Miller/Coxhill
1974	Hatfield and the North	Hatfield & the North
1975	Hatfield and the North	The Rotters’ Club
1978	National Health	National Health
1978	National Health	Of Queues and Cures
1980	Hatfield and the North	Afters
1982	Gowen/Miller/Sinclair/Tomkins	Before A Word Is Said
1982	National Health	D.S. Al Coda
1986	Dave Stewart & Barbara Gaskin	Up from the Dark
1987	Phil Miller	Cutting Both Ways
1988	Geoff Leigh and Frank Wuyts	From Here to Drums
1988	Phil Miller	Split Seconds
1990	National Health	Complete
1991	Phil Miller/In Cahoots	Live 1986–1989
1991	Phil Miller	Digging In
1992	Phil Miller/Fred Baker	Double Up
1993	Phil Miller/In Cahoots	Live in Japan
1993	Hatfield and the North	Live 90
1993	Short Wave	Short Wave Live
1994	Phil Miller/In Cahoots	Recent Discoveries
1994	Matching Mole	BBC Radio 1 In Concert
1994	Robert Wyatt	Flotsam Jetsam (Matching Mole)
1995	Miller + Hopper	Unsettled Scores
1996	National Health	Missing Pieces
1996	Phil Miller/In Cahoots	Parallel
1998	Pip Pyle	7 Year Itch
1999	Mark Hewins	Rebela
2001	In Cahoots	Out of the Blue
2003	Phil Miller/In Cahoots	All That
2005	Hatfield and the North	Hatwise Choice
2006	Hatfield and the North	Hattitude
2006	Phil Miller/In Cahoots	Conspiracy Theories
2011	Phil Miller/In Cahoots	Mind Over Matter

== Filmography ==
- 2015: Romantic Warriors III: Canterbury Tales (DVD)
