= Fred Thelonious Baker =

English guitarist

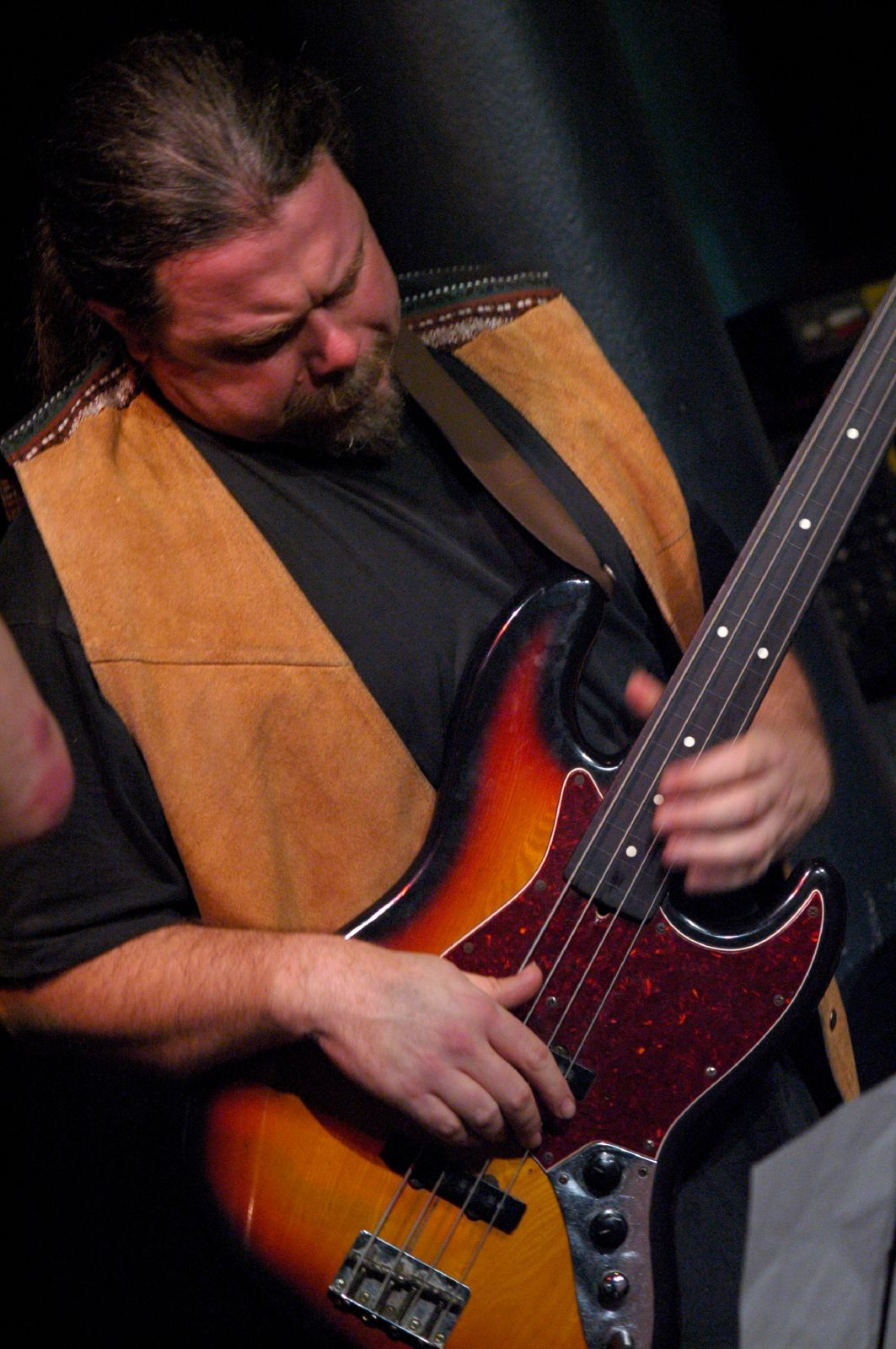
Fred Thelonious Baker in 2007

Fred Thelonious Baker (born 4 June 1960) is an English guitarist and jazz bass guitarist from Tibshelf, Derbyshire. He is known for playing in Phil Miller's Canterbury scene band In Cahoots.

Baker played the guitar until his mid-teens, at which point he began to take an interest in the bass as well. He played in The John Etheridge/Ric Sanders Group in the early 1980s. He has also worked with his own group, the Fred Thelonious Baker Group who recorded a self-titled album in 1984. Baker has recorded several albums with Harry Beckett. They have also made a concert tour in Europe together. Baker accompanied Beckett's band on a Charles Mingus tribute tour in the UK. Other artists Baker has worked with include Horace Parlan, Vikki Clayton and Elton Dean.

Baker joined In Cahoots in April 1988, replacing their bassist Hugh Hopper. He has toured and recorded six albums with them, and remains a key member of the band. He also works as a teacher at Birmingham Conservatoire and The University of Huddersfield.

Baker is the current bassist for Soft Machine, having been chosen by his predecessor Roy Babbington.

== Discography ==
Year	Artist	Title
1984	Fred Thelonious Baker	Fred Thelonious Baker Group (released 1988)
1987	Harry Beckett	Bremen Concert
1987	Harry Beckett	Live, Vol. 2
1988	Phil Miller	Split Seconds
1989	In Cahoots	In Cahoots Live 86–89
1991	Phil Miller	Digging In
1991	Harry Beckett	All Four One
1992	Phil Miller & Fred Baker	Double Up
1993	In Cahoots	In Cahoots Live in Japan
1993	various artists	A Moon of Roses
1993	Harry Beckett	Les Jardins Du Casino
1994	In Cahoots	Recent Discoveries
1994	Fred Thelonious Baker	Missing Link
1996	In Cahoots	Parallel
1998	Pip Pyle	7 Year Itch
1999	Fred Thelonious Baker	Basically Speaking
2001	In Cahoots	Out of the Blue
2003	In Cahoots	All That
2004	Pip Pyle's Bash!	Belle Illusion
2004	Pete Saberton	Rich Core
2007	In Cahoots	Conspiracy Theories
2010	Joe Sachse, John Marshall & Fred T. Baker	One Take
2010	Joe Sachse, John Marshall & Fred T. Baker	18. Chemnitzer Jazzfest (DVD of above, released 2013)
2011	Phil Miller In Cahoots	Mind Over Matter
2014	Fred Thelonious Baker	Life Suite
2023	Soft Machine	Other Doors
