= National Health (album) =

Studio album by National Health
- Released: February 1978
- Recorded: February – March 1977
- Studios: The Point, Victoria, London, on the Mobile Mobile; intro to "Elephants" recorded live at the M.L.T.S. (Tiel, Holland)
- Genres: Jazz fusion, progressive rock, avant-garde
- Length: 49:58
- Labels: Affinity Records, Esoteric Recordings (Reissue)
- Producer: Mike Dunne

National Health chronology
National Health (1978)	Of Queues and Cures (1978)

Professional ratings
Review scores
Source	Rating
AllMusic	4/5 stars
The Encyclopedia of Popular Music	3/5 stars

National Health is the first album recorded by the progressive rock and jazz fusion group National Health, one of the last representatives of the artistically prolific Canterbury scene.

== Critical reception ==
In a retrospective review, All About Jazz wrote that "revisiting the disc over 30 years later reveals a strength in composition, improvisation and orchestration/arrangement that makes it another high point in the careers of everyone involved." In his History of Progressive Rock, Paul Stump said that National Health "retains an askew charm, dominated by a wheezy, rough-and-reedy sound at odds with the amniotic sybaritism of most Progressive production jobs at the time." He opined that despite the album having been criticized for "excessive compositional rigour", the elaborate and inventive compositions actually enabled the soloists to be more adventurous. The Billboard Guide to Progressive Music called the album "easily the best of [National Health's] three releases."

== Track listing ==
No.	Title	Writer(s)	Length
1.	"Tenemos Roads"	Dave Stewart	14:43
2.	"Brujo"	Alan Gowen	10:19
3.	"Borogoves (Excerpt from Part Two)"	Stewart	4:16
4.	"Borogoves (Part One)"	Stewart	6:37
5.	"Elephants"	Gowen, Stewart	14:37

== Personnel ==
- Phil Miller – electric guitar
- Dave Stewart – acoustic piano, electric piano, organ (tracks 1, 2, 4, 5), Clavinet (track 3)
- Pip Pyle – drums, glockenspiel (tracks 2, 5), pixiphone (track 5), gong (track 1), cowbell (track 1), tambourine (track 1), finger cymbals (track 2), shakers (track 2), bells (track 2)
- Neil Murray – fretless bass guitar

with

- Alan Gowen – acoustic piano (tracks 2, 5), electric piano, Moog synthesizer
- Jimmy Hastings – flute (tracks 1–3, 5), clarinet (tracks 3, 4), bass clarinet (track 1)
- John Mitchell – percussion (track 1), güiro (track 2), temple block (track 2), conga (track 3)
- Amanda Parsons – vocals (tracks 1, 2, 4, 5)
