= Battle of Hastings (disambiguation) =

The Battle of Hastings was a battle that took place near Hastings, England, on 14 October 1066.

Battle of Hastings may also refer to:

- The Battle of Hastings (album), a 1995 album by Caravan
- The Battle of Hastings (play), a 1778 play by Richard Cumberland
- Battle of Hastings reenactment, a yearly reenactment of the Battle of Hastings, held at Battle Abbey in Battle, East Sussex, UK
