= Romantic Warriors III: Canterbury Tales =

2015 documentary film

- Directed by: Adele Schmidt; José Zegarra Holder
- Written by: Adele Schmidt; José Zegarra Holder
- Produced by: Adele Schmidt; José Zegarra Holder; Jonathan Jarrett; Jurriaan Hage
- Starring: Pye Hastings; Geoffrey Richardson; Dirk Mont Campbell; Brian Hopper; Dave Sinclair; Bill MacCormick; Robert Jan Stips; Didier Malherbe; Phil Miller; Roy Babbington; John Etheridge; Didier Thibault; Patrick Forgas; Benoît Moerlen; Theo Travis; Dave Newhouse; Richard Sinclair; Daevid Allen; Michel Delville; Marc Capel; Alfonzo Munloz; Vasco Trilla; Liam Magill; Joel Magill; Raven Bush; Fred Rother; Bruce Gallenter; Aymeric Leroy; Leonardo Pavkovic
- Cinematography: Adele Schmidt; José Zegarra Holder
- Edited by: Adele Schmidt
- Music by: Caravan; Delivery; Egg; Forgas Band Phenomena; Gilgamesh; Glass; Gong; Hatfield and the North; In Cahoots; Matching Mole; Moving Gelatine Plates; National Health; Nucleus; Planeta Imaginario; Quiet Sun; Soft Machine; Soft Machine Legacy; Supersister; Syd Arthur; The Muffins; The Wilde Flowers; The Wrong Object
- Distributed by: Zeitgeist Media
- Release date: April 17, 2015
- Running time: 118 minutes
- Country: United States
- Languages: English; French; Spanish

Romantic Warriors III: Canterbury Tales (2015) is the third in a series of feature-length documentaries about Progressive rock written and directed by Adele Schmidt and José Zegarra Holder. This one focuses on the music of the Canterbury scene.

The DVD was completed with the aid of an Indiegogo campaign in 2014.

== Background ==
Adele Schmidt and José Zegarra Holder are co-founders of Zeitgeist Media LLC, a video production company based in Washington, D.C. Schmidt has produced several films, including a documentary on Albert Schweitzer, Albert Schweitzer: Called to Africa (2006), which won the 2008 Gabriel Award and the 2009 Telly Award. Previous Progressive rock documentary films in the series include Romantic Warriors: A Progressive Music Saga (2010) and Romantic Warriors II: A Progressive Music Saga About Rock in Opposition (2012).

== Synopsis ==
Romantic Warriors III: Canterbury Tales begins with The Wilde Flowers, the archetypal Canterbury scene band. Rare period performance footage, still photos, and recordings are interspersed with contemporary interviews with almost all of the surviving musicians from this era. From The Wilde Flowers the story moves to Soft Machine which initially comprised four ex-members of The Wilde Flowers, Robert Wyatt, Kevin Ayers, Mike Ratledge and Daevid Allen. When Australian-born Allen was refused re-entry into the United Kingdom in 1967 after a gig in Saint-Tropez on the French Riviera, Soft Machine elected to continue as a 3-piece band and, at the suggestion of Jimi Hendrix, added a distortion pedal to the organ to make up for the missing guitar. Meanwhile in Paris, Allen formed Gong, with a spacier sound involving early synthesizers and echo units. Daevid was interviewed for this film just weeks before his death from cancer. Although obviously unwell, his sense of humor and playfulness remained forefront. Soft Machine subsequently replaced Ayers with bassist Hugh Hopper (also ex-The Wilde Flowers). Next Dave Sinclair introduces the band Caravan, consisting of the remaining members of The Wilde Flowers. Bands influenced by the original Canterbury scene began popping up around 1970 all over the world, including Moving Gelatine Plates (France) and Supersister (Netherlands). Their history is described by their main composers, with performance footage and images of their album covers. Next to be featured is Forgas Band Phenomena which came a little later but definitely is Canterbury-influenced.

Dirk Mont Campbell introduces the bands Uriel, Arzachel and Egg, with passing reference to Spirogyra (which had Canterbury roots). Soon all these bands would be lumped into the Canterbury scene as the players mixed with musicians from Canterbury to form Hatfield and the North, National Health and a host of other bands. Soft Machine’s evolution to a big band with the addition of the horn section from Keith Tippett’s band is put in context by Leonardo Pavkovic, with footage from a concert on French TV. Simultaneously Soft Machine was moving away from vocal music, causing Robert Wyatt to leave the band and form Matching Mole. Related bands Quiet Sun and Delivery are profiled and explained by Bill MacCormick and Phil Miller. Returning to Gong, David Allen explains that the theatrical look of the band was inspired by Peter Gabriel of Genesis, and the subsequent development of the band with percussionist Benoît Moerlen, guitarist Steve Hillage and synthesist Tim Blake. Caravan’s new lineup with violist Geoffrey Richardson is next, followed by the origin of Hatfield and the North, the “first Canterbury supergroup” (according to Bruce Gallenter of Downtown Music Gallery). With money in short supply Hatfield soon reconfigured into National Health with ex-members of Gilgamesh and Gong with John Greaves from Henry Cow.

By this time a number of bands outside of the original core were displaying heavy Canterbury influences, including Anaid (France), Machine and the Synergetic Nuts (Japan), Fulano (Chile), Phlox (Estonia), Amoeba Split (Spain), Violeta de Outono (Brazil), D.F.A. (Italy), Iceberg (Spain), Orquestra Mirasol (Spain) and Planeta Imaginario (Spain). The latter is shown rehearsing and discussing the music that inspired them. Michel Delville and his band The Wrong Object (Belgium) is featured next.

Returning to the continuing development of Soft Machine, ex-members of Nucleus joined including drummer John Marshall, bassist Roy Babbington and reed player, keyboardist & composer Karl Jenkins. TV footage from Germany shows the band in performance. Also about this time Daevid Allen left Gong sick of the business, and they continued on as Pierre Moerlen's Gong. Meanwhile Phil Miller formed In Cahoots and Soft Machine added Allan Holdsworth on guitar, their first guitarist since Daevid left in 1967. A quick check-in with Caravan today leads into a contemporary Canterbury band, Syd Arthur. Daevid and Dave Newhouse (from the Muffins) recall the genesis of New York Gong and Material in New York, which leads to the revitalization of the Gong name in the 1980s. A lengthy profile of The Muffins follows, with no direct Canterbury ties but extensive Canterbury influences. Other American Canterbury-influenced bands are then mentioned: Volare, Glass, However, Happy The Man, Master Cylinder. This leads to a discussion of the economics of CD releases in the late 1990s/early 2000s, and the reunion of Supersister and revitalization of the whole Progressive rock genre through reissues. The Progman Cometh festivals in Seattle celebrated Canterbury in 2002 and 2003. Soft Machine Legacy honors the spirit of Soft Machine with players from different eras of the band. Sadly many of the original Canterbury players have died recently — including the “unofficial narrator” of the film Daevid Allen — but the huge influence of the whole sprawling Canterbury scene carries on.

A companion 4 hour 48-minute DVD, entitled Got Canterbury? Romantic Warriors III: Special Features DVD, was released May 2, 2016 with additional unused interview footage, unused performance footage by Soft Machine Legacy, Dave Sinclair, Forgas Band Phenomena and The Wrong Object, plus special concerts to celebrate the RWIII DVD release by The Muffins on May 16, 2015 and Glass on February 14, 2016.

== Reception ==
- Progmistress Raffaella Berry says, "Canterbury Tales is a beautiful, deeply touching (though not depressing) piece of filmmaking, a warm-hearted tribute to those protagonists of the scene who are no longer with us. While the film’s subdued mood reflects the impermanence of things, the lasting legacy of the music created by that handful of young people from a provincial corner of England is given its due."
- Roger Farbey (All About Jazz) writes, "Whilst this two hour film suffers from a degree of overzealous jump-cutting from one group to another and even one era to another, there is much to commend it. A good balance of musical clips and interviews makes the film easily digestible particularly when the interviewees have previously been rarely seen or heard in a speaking role; David and Richard Sinclair, Didier Malherbe, Roy Babbington, Phil Miller and Daevid Allen are great examples of this. There is no voiceover narration, (such a clichéd and overused documentary device), and this happily allows the musicians and the music to speak eloquently for themselves. This is without doubt absolutely essential viewing for anyone interested in the Canterbury Scene, Progressive Rock or Jazz Rock."

== Romantic Warriors series ==
- Romantic Warriors: A Progressive Music Saga (2010)
- Romantic Warriors II: A Progressive Music Saga About Rock in Opposition (2012)
- Romantic Warriors III: Canterbury Tales (2015)
- Romantic Warriors IV: Krautrock (2019 three parts)
