= Afters =

Afters may refer to:

- the British slang for dessert
- Afters (1990 film), a 1990 British television film by Polly Teale
- Afters (album), a 1980 compilation album by Hatfield and the North
- The Afters, an American Christian rock group
