= Spirogyra (band) =

English progressive folk band (1971–1973)

- Spirogyra c. 1971. From left: Steve Borrill, Julian Cusack, Martin Cockerham, Barbara Gaskin

Background information
- Origin: Canterbury, England
- Genres: British folk rock; Acid folk
- Years active: 1967–1974, 2004–2018
- Labels: B&C Records; Pegasus Records; Polydor; Mooncrest Records; Castle Music; Brain Records; Si-Wan Records; Turning Round Records
- Past members: Martin Cockerham, Barbara Gaskin, Julian Cusack, Mark Francis, Steve Borrill

Spirogyra were a British folk rock/prog band that released three albums between 1971 and 1973. The group's most well-known members are co-founder, songwriter, and guitarist Martin Cockerham and singer Barbara Gaskin. Their sound has been described as "whimsically English" and their third album, Bells, Boots and Shambles, has come to be regarded as "a lost masterpiece". A later incarnation of the band was formed in the early 2000s, with further studio albums in 2009 and 2011. The band conclusively ceased to exist with Martin Cockerham's 2018 death.

== History ==
=== Formation (1967–1970) ===
Spirogyra was originally formed as a duo by Martin Cockerham (vocals/guitar) and Mark Francis in Bolton, Lancashire in the summer of 1967. This original incarnation of the band produced no recordings, and ended when Cockerham left to attend the University of Kent at Canterbury.

In December 1969, Cockerham recruited a number of fellow students for a reconceived Spirogyra. This iteration of the group was expansive, including over ten members. Eventually, the band was pared down to four members: Cockerham himself on vocals and guitar, plus Barbara Gaskin (vocals), Steve Borrill (bass guitar), and Julian Cusack (violin). The band was soon spotted by Max Hole, who offered to manage the group, and "used his position as Student Union Entertainment Secretary to set up gigs at universities throughout the country". They recorded demos at the music room of Keynes College, part of the University of Kent, which would be released on the Burn the Bridges compilation in 2000.

Unusually, the group was able to persuade university officials to allow the members, their manager, and a roadie to take a one-year leave of absence from their studies. The group played live frequently, opening for groups such as Traffic and completing two tours of the Netherlands. After nearly being signed to Apple Records, manager Max Hole arranged a three-album recording contract with B&C Records in the U.K. Meanwhile, a deal for European and American distribution with Polydor was announced, but apparently fell through; the albums were instead released in Germany on Brain, and were not available in the United States. On all three albums, Dave Mattacks of Fairport Convention played drums. Although all of the albums sold poorly at the time, they have developed a cult following in the decades since. Original copies of all three albums are rare and expensive today, but have been reissued several times.

=== St Radigunds (1971) ===
Spirogyra at Kent University, 1971.

Their debut album, St Radigunds, was recorded at Sound Techniques studio, produced by Robert Kirby and engineered by Jerry Boys. Named after the Canterbury street on which the members lived, its lyrics express the anti-capitalistic, anti-materialistic orientation of the band and of the broader Canterbury scene. The album has been described as "effectively a document of Spirogyra's well-honed live set". Released in September 1971, it received positive reviews in NME and other rock publications, and was supported by a 24-date tour of the United Kingdom.

A retrospective review in Record Collector said of St Radigunds: "Highly original in terms of songwriting and delivery, and grounded by the beautiful voice of Barbara Gaskin, they forged, on the back of this debut, a large cult following on the underground circuit".

=== Old Boot Wine (1972) ===
Its follow-up, 1972's Old Boot Wine, was produced by Max Hole and released on B&C's subsidiary imprint, Pegasus Records. This album showcased the group "with their rough edges removed and a slicker almost commercial sound", yet it is generally less well-regarded than their other releases. Part of the sound change owed to the reduced presence of violinist Julian Cusack, who had returned to university, and the return of original co-founder Mark Francis.

=== Bells, Boots and Shambles (1973) ===
Soon after the release of Old Boot Wine, the band was pared down to the duo of Cockerham and Gaskin, who were by now romantically involved. Their final album, Bells, Boots and Shambles, was recorded in Morgan Studios in London and produced once more by Max Hole. The album was issued by Polydor in 1973, B&C Records having gone out of business the previous year. The album featured several guest musicians, including former members Cusack and Borrill, and Henry Lowther on trumpet. Jeanette Leech wrote that this album "really marks [Spirogyra] out as a beacon of progressive folk. [...] Bells, Boots and Shambles bends away from the rockier elements of their first two albums toward weeping classicism and Eno-esque art-house soundtracks". With its "sense of hopelessness" and "existential angst," it has been described as a forerunner of Joy Division. Although the album sold poorly, it has come to be regarded as "a lost masterpiece".

=== Final tour (1974) ===
In March 1974, Spirogyra undertook their last tour, with Martin Cockerham (vocals and guitar), Barbara Gaskin (vocals and electric piano), Rick Biddulph (bass and guitars) and Jon Gifford (woodwinds). Cockerham has said that he considered this lineup to be the best of the classic period, and that his favorite Spirogyra song, "Sea Song", was written during this time.

Although no studio recordings of this lineup exist, a number of live recordings were made. Several of these were collected on a limited-run release called Swan Songs 69–74, self-released by Cockerham in 2008.

== Breakup and reunions ==
The band dissolved in 1974, when Martin Cockerham moved to Ireland. Cockerham lived abroad for many years, with stints in Ireland, India, Bali, California and Hawai'i.

After the breakup, Barbara Gaskin spent three years travelling in Asia, spending time in Japan, Java, Bali, and India, singing professionally and teaching English.

In 1981, Gaskin formed a duo with Dave Stewart, whom she had known from her time recording with Egg and Hatfield and the North in the early 1970s. The duo had a number one single that year in the UK with a cover version of the song "It's My Party". Subsequent singles "Busy Doing Nothing" (1983), and "The Locomotion" (1986) also entered the UK Singles Chart. Seven albums followed, released on the duo's own Broken Records label. Gaskin and Stewart continue to work together and occasionally play live concerts.

In the decades after the band's breakup, each of their three albums was rereleased on CD. Cockerham recalled that they sold better in this format than they ever had on vinyl. In 2000, Burn the Bridges was released, showcasing the band's original demos which had been recorded prior to St. Radigunds. 2005 saw the release of A Canterbury Tale, which included the band's three studio albums, their "I Hear You're Going Somewhere (Joe Really)" single, and several outtake recordings.

In 2006, Cockerham returned to England. He began to privately issue new editions of old Spirogyra material and some previously unreleased work. He had reunited with Mark Francis using their original Spirogyra name, and from 2004 to 2006 they recorded a new album which was released on CD in 2009, entitled Children's Earth. This was the first Spirogyra release to not feature Barbara Gaskin. At the same time another new album called Rainbow Empire, while officially a Martin Cockerham solo release, featured the same collaborations and is musically cognate.

On 6 June 2010, Spirogyra reunited for "A Psychedelic evening with Spirogyra" at The Union Chapel Islington, hosted by Ron Brand and Tiffany Vivienne Brown of Ron Brand Management.

The duo of Cockerham and Francis, with several colleagues, combined for another Spirogyra album in 2011, calling it Spirogyra 5. This album reunited Cockerham and the trumpeter Henry Lowther, who had earlier contributed to the Bells, Boots and Shambles album.

Martin Cockerham, who was born Martin Neil Cockerham on 27 August 1950, in Ottley, West Yorkshire, died on 5 April 2018 in Thailand, signalling a permanent end to the group.

== Discography ==
Date of Release	Title	Label
Albums
September 1971	St. Radigund's	B&C Records
June 1972	Old Boot Wine	Pegasus
April 1973	Bells, Boots and Shambles	Polydor
2009	Children's Earth	Self-released
2011	Spirogyra 5	Turning Round Records
Singles
April 1972	Dangerous Dave / Captain's Log	Pegasus
February 1973	I Hear You're Going Somewhere (Joe Really) / Old Boot Wine	Polydor
Compilations
June 1994	Spirogyra Box Set	Si-Wan Records
March 1999	We Were a Happy Crew	Mooncrest
September 2000	Burn the Bridges: The Demo Tapes 1970–1971	Repertoire
May 2005	A Canterbury Tale	Castle Music
