= Caravan (Caravan album) =

1968 music album by Caravan

Studio album by Caravan
- Released: January 1969 (UK); March 1969 (US)
- Recorded: September 1968
- Studio: Advision Studios, London
- Genre: Psychedelic rock; Canterbury scene
- Length: 34:04
- Label: Verve Forecast
- Producer: Tony Cox

Caravan chronology
Caravan (1969)	If I Could Do It All Over Again, I'd Do It All Over You (1970)

Professional ratings
Review scores
Source	Rating
AllMusic	4.5/5 stars
Uncut	3/5 stars

Caravan is the debut album by the British Canterbury scene and progressive rock band Caravan. It was released by Verve Forecast in January (UK) and March 1969 (US) and was the group's only album for the label.

== Background ==
The album was the result of the band borrowing equipment from Soft Machine (who were touring the U.S. at the time with Jimi Hendrix and using his backline), producing "an unusually mature musical statement". The album was released in stereo and mono, in both the United States and United Kingdom, but failed to reach chart hit status.

== Track listing ==
All tracks credited to Richard Coughlan, Pye Hastings, Dave Sinclair & Richard Sinclair except where noted.

Side one
No.	Title	Length
1.	"Place of My Own"	4:00
2.	"Ride"	3:41
3.	"Policeman"	2:45
4.	"Love Song with Flute"	4:09
5.	"Cecil Rons"	4:05

Side two
No.	Title	Writer(s)	Length
6.	"Magic Man"		4:01
7.	"Grandma's Lawn"		3:23
8.	"Where but for Caravan Would I?"	Coughlan, Hastings, D. Sinclair, R. Sinclair, Brian Hopper	9:01

== Re-release ==
The 2002 CD re-release included two full versions of the album, in its original mono and in stereo, and an extra track "Hello Hello" (3:12) which had originally been issued as a single.

== Personnel ==
Caravan

- Pye Hastings – lead vocals (1, 2, 4), co-lead vocals (5, 6, 8), guitars, bass guitar
- Richard Sinclair – lead vocals (3, 7), co-lead vocals (5, 6, 8), bass guitar, guitar
- Dave Sinclair – Hammond organ, backing vocals
- Richard Coughlan – drums

Additional personnel

- Jimmy Hastings – flute on "Love Song with Flute"
- Tony Cox – production
- Keith Davis of DBWX – sleeve design
