= Gilgamesh (band) =

British rock band

- Origin: United Kingdom
- Genres: Canterbury scene; jazz rock
- Years active: 1972–1975, 1977–1978
- Labels: Caroline Records, Charly Records, Cuneiform Records
- Past members: Alan Gowen; Mike Travis; Jeff Clyne; Phil Lee; Neil Murray; Mont Campbell; Hugh Hopper; Trevor Tomkins; Richard Sinclair

Gilgamesh (1972–1975, 1977–1978) were a British rock band active during the 1970s, led by the keyboardist Alan Gowen. The group were associated with the Canterbury scene.

== History ==
The original foundation of Gilgamesh was the collaboration between keyboardist Alan Gowen and drummer Mike Travis, who worked together on a band project with guitarist Rick Morcombe. The initial Gilgamesh line-up comprised Gowen, Travis, Morcombe, Jeff Clyne on bass, and Alan Wakeman on saxophone.

The band's line-up took some time to stabilise, with musicians such as Richard Sinclair deputising for Clyne during their debut performance in January 1973. Shortly thereafter, the line-up settled into a quartet featuring Gowen, Travis, Phil Lee on guitar (recommended by Travis), and Neil Murray on bass. Throughout 1973, the group performed regularly, including two notable co-headlining gigs with Hatfield and the North, which featured a "double-quartet" set based on a 40-minute composition by Gowen. During this period, the band also recorded a demo tape for use in securing gigs and a recording contract.

In late 1973, Murray was replaced by Steve Cook, but performances became increasingly infrequent despite the band recording several radio sessions for the BBC's jazz programmes. For one such session, the quartet was joined by a second keyboard player, Peter Lemer. In 1975, Gilgamesh secured a recording contract with Virgin's subsidiary label Caroline Records. Their debut album was recorded during studio downtime at the Virgin-owned Manor Studio, with Dave Stewart from Hatfield and the North co-producing.

Gowen and Stewart, having become friends, discussed potential collaboration. Stewart, however, was initially reluctant to join two bands simultaneously. After Hatfield and the North disbanded in mid-1975, Stewart briefly became an auxiliary member of Gilgamesh, participating in one gig and several radio sessions. During this time, plans for a Stewart-Gowen collaboration took shape, ultimately resulting in the formation of National Health, which also featured Gilgamesh guitarist Phil Lee for a short time. Gilgamesh themselves disbanded in late 1975 following the cancellation of a proposed Scottish tour.

After leaving National Health in 1977, Gowen reformed Gilgamesh as a rehearsal-focused group, featuring Neil Murray, Phil Lee, and drummer Trevor Tomkins (a longtime collaborator of Lee's). This line-up convened for occasional rehearsals. In June 1978, the band recorded their second album, Another Fine Tune You've Got Me Into, which was released in 1979 on Charly Records. The album featured Gowen, Lee, Tomkins, and bassist Hugh Hopper, but the band ceased to exist after the recording. Gowen died in 1981.

In 2000, Cuneiform Records released Arriving Twice, a collection of archival recordings by Gilgamesh. The album includes the 1973 demo and two radio sessions from 1974 to 1975, featuring various line-ups with Gowen, Lee, Mike Travis, Murray, Steve Cook, Jeff Clyne, and Peter Lemer. It also includes several previously unheard compositions, notably "Extract", which was part of the unrecorded Gilgamesh/Hatfield and the North double-quartet piece.

== Deaths ==
Keyboardist Alan Gowen died from leukaemia on 17 May 1981, at the age of 33.

Bassists Hugh Hopper and Jeff Clyne both died in 2009. Hopper died from leukaemia on 7 June, aged 64, while Clyne suffered a heart attack on 16 November, aged 72.

Drummer Trevor Tomkins died on 9 September 2022, at the age of 81, and drummer Mike Travis died in September 2023, aged 78.

Guitarist Phil Lee died May 2024.

== Discography ==
- Gilgamesh (1975)
- Another Fine Tune You've Got Me Into (1979)
- Arriving Twice (2000)

== Filmography ==
- 2015: Romantic Warriors III: Canterbury Tales (DVD)
