= If I Could Do It All Over Again, I'd Do It All Over You =

Studio album by Caravan
- Released: 4 September 1970
- Recorded: February 1970
- Studio: Tangerine (London)
- Genre: Progressive rock; Canterbury scene
- Length: 47:40
- Label: Decca
- Producer: Terry King

Caravan chronology
Caravan (1969)	If I Could Do It All Over Again, I'd Do It All Over You (1970)	In the Land of Grey and Pink (1971)

If I Could Do It All Over Again, I'd Do It All Over You is the second album by Canterbury scene band Caravan, released on 4 September 1970. The album is representative of the Canterbury scene genre, featuring representative organ solos and melodic vocals typical of the band's style. The album was released on Decca Records, as was the title track as a single release.

== Background ==
Caravan had released their debut album, Caravan, in 1969, achieving some live success and had appeared on UK and German television in early 1969. However, their label, Verve Records shut down their British operations and dropped the band. Guitarist Pye Hastings later recalled "that situation really left us in limbo". The band regrouped and continued performing live, eventually finding a manager Terry King. David Hitchcock, an employee of Decca Records' art department, saw the band perform at the London Lyceum and recommended that his boss, Hugh Mendl, sign them.

Sessions for the album started at Tangerine Studios on Balls Pond Road, Dalston, London in September 1969, with the band self-producing and Robin Sylvester engineering. Hastings recalled that this caused problems, as every member of the band wanted his instrument to be louder than the others. The band recorded a few tracks, but these were abandoned while the band went out on tour, having become popular on the university circuit in Britain and Europe. They regrouped in February the following year and recorded the songs on the album mostly live onto 8-track tape. The highlight of the sessions was a fourteen-minute jazz-rock piece assembled from various sections contributed by the band, called "Can't Be Long Now" (listed as "For Richard" in the 1973 live album Caravan and the New Symphonia). Keyboardist David Sinclair composed the basic structure, while bassist Richard Sinclair wrote the main tune. Hastings invited his brother Jimmy to guest on saxophone and flute, which would become a regular feature of Caravan's studio work.

The cover was photographed by David Jupe in Holland Park, London.

== Release and reception ==
Professional ratings
Review scores
Source	Rating
AllMusic	4/5 stars

"Hello Hello", backed with the title track, was released as a single in August 1970, which led to an appearance on the BBC's Top of the Pops. The album was released the following month in the UK, and in March 1971 in the US. According to AllMusic, "If I Could Do It All Over Again contains significant progressions over the first album."

"Can't Be Long Now," also known as "For Richard," became a staple of live Caravan shows and was typically the set closer. A fully orchestrated, live version can be heard on the 1974 release Caravan and the New Symphonia.

The CD was remastered in 2001, with the addition of bonus tracks, including the abandoned September 1969 sessions, and the outtake "A Day in the Life of Maurice Haylett", written about the band's road manager.

== Track listing ==
All songs by Richard Coughlan, Pye Hastings, Richard Sinclair and Dave Sinclair.

Side one
No.	Title	Lead vocals	Length
1.	"If I Could Do It All Over Again, I'd Do It All Over You"	Hastings and R. Sinclair	3:07
2.	"And I Wish I Were Stoned" "Don't Worry"	Hastings and R. Sinclair	8:20
3.	"As I Feel I Die"	Hastings	5:06
4.	"With an Ear to the Ground You Can Make It" "Martinian" "Only Cox" "Reprise"	Hastings	9:54

Side two
No.	Title	Lead vocals	Length
1.	"Hello Hello"	R. Sinclair	3:45
2.	"Asforteri"	Hastings	1:21
3.	"Can't Be Long Now" "Françoise" "For Richard" "Warlock"	Hastings	14:21
4.	"Limits"	Hastings	1:35

Bonus tracks on 2001 CD rerelease
No.	Title	Length
9.	"A Day in the Life of Maurice Haylett" (outtake)	5:07
10.	"Why? (And I Wish I Were Stoned)" (demo version)	4:22
11.	"Clipping the 8th (Hello Hello)" (demo version)	3:13
12.	"As I Feel I Die" (demo version)	4:39

== Personnel ==
Caravan

- Pye Hastings – vocals, 6- and 12-string electric guitars, 6 string acoustic guitar, claves, percussion (worn leather strap, ashtrays), voice (impersonation of a friendly gorilla)
- Richard Sinclair – vocals, bass guitar, tambourine, hedge clippers
- David Sinclair – Hammond organ, piano, harpsichord
- Richard Coughlan – drums, congas, bongos, maracas, finger cymbals

Additional personnel

- Jimmy Hastings – saxophone, flute
- Robin Sylvester – engineer
- David Jupe – photography and graphics
- Terry King – manager
- Maurice Haylett – road manager

== Sources ==
- Powell, Mark (2001). If I Could Do It All Over Again, I'd Do It All Over You (Media notes). Universal / Decca. 8829682.
