= BBC Radio 1 Live in Concert (Caravan album) =

Live album by Caravan
- Released: 27 April 1991
- Recorded: 21 March 1975
- Studios: Paris Theatre, London
- Genre: Progressive rock
- Length: 56:30
- Label: Windsong International

Caravan chronology
Back to Front (1982)	BBC Radio 1 Live in Concert (1991)	Cool Water (1994)

Professional ratings
Review scores
Source	Rating
AllMusic	3/5 stars

BBC Radio 1 Live in Concert is the 1991 album released by Caravan. It was recorded live on 21 March 1975 at the Paris Theatre, London.

== Track listing ==
1. "Radio Show Introduction" – 0:30
2. "The Love In Your Eye / To Catch Me A Brother / Subsultus / Debouchement / Tilbury Kecks" (Richard Coughlan, Pye Hastings, Richard Sinclair) – 15:42
3. "Can't Be Long Now / Françoise / For Richard / Warlock" (Coughlan, Hastings, Dave Sinclair, R. Sinclair) – 17:21
4. "The Dabsong Conshirtoe" (D. Sinclair, John Murphy) – 18:58
5. "Hoedown" (Hastings) – 5:28

== Personnel ==
Caravan

- Pye Hastings – guitar, vocals
- Geoff Richardson – violin, guitar
- David Sinclair – keyboards
- Mike Wedgwood – bass guitar
- Richard Coughlan – drums

== Releases information ==
- CD Windsong International WINCD 003
