= The Rotters' Club (album) =

Studio album by Hatfield and the North
- Released: 7 March 1975
- Recorded: January–February 1975
- Studios: Saturn, Worthing
- Genres: Canterbury scene; art rock
- Length: 50:15
- Label: Virgin
- Producers: Hatfield and the North

Hatfield and the North chronology
Hatfield and the North (1974)	The Rotters' Club (1975)	Afters (1980)

Professional ratings
Review scores
Source	Rating
AllMusic	4/5 stars

The Rotters' Club is the second album by the English Canterbury scene rock band Hatfield and the North, released in March 1975. It was in part an inspiration for the 2001 novel The Rotters' Club by Jonathan Coe.

== Track listing ==
No.	Title	Writer(s)	Length
1.	"Share It"	Richard Sinclair, Pip Pyle	3:03
2.	"Lounging There Trying"	Phil Miller	3:15
3.	"(Big) John Wayne Socks Psychology on the Jaw"	Dave Stewart	0:43
4.	"Chaos at the Greasy Spoon"	Sinclair, Pyle	0:30
5.	"The Yes No Interlude"	Pyle	7:01
6.	"Fitter Stoke Has a Bath"	Pyle	7:33
7.	"Didn't Matter Anyway"	Sinclair	3:33
8.	"Underdub"	Miller	4:02
9.	"Mumps": "Your Majesty Is Like a Cream Donut (Quiet)"; "Lumps"; "Prenut"; "Your Majesty Is Like a Cream Donut (Loud)"	Stewart	20:31 1:59 12:35 3:55 1:37

1987 reissue bonus tracks, previously only available on the compilation Afters (1980)
No.	Title	Writer(s)	Length
10.	"(Big) John Wayne Socks Psychology on the Jaw"	Stewart	0:43
11.	"Chaos at the Greasy Spoon"	Sinclair, Pyle	0:20
12.	"Halfway Between Heaven and Earth"	Sinclair	6:07
13.	"Oh, Len's Nature!" (aka "Nan True's Hole") (live 1975)	Miller	1:59
14.	"Lything and Gracing" (live 1974)	Miller	3:58

Notes: The first two are abridged versions of those on the original release of The Rotters' Club. "Halfway Between Heaven and Earth" was first released on "Over the Rainbow" – a various artists live album. This version is slightly shorter, the introduction is cross-faded with the preceding track. The last two tracks were first released on Afters.

== Personnel ==
- Phil Miller – guitar
- Dave Stewart – Fender Rhodes electric piano, Hammond organ, Minimoog, acoustic piano, tone generator
- Richard Sinclair – bass guitar, lead vocals; guitar (7)
- Pip Pyle – drums

== Guest musicians ==
- Jimmy Hastings – saxophone (5 & 9), flute (6–8 & 9) (guest)
- Barbara Gaskin, Amanda Parsons, Ann Rosenthal – backing vocals (6 & 9)
- Tim Hodgkinson – clarinet (3 & 5)
- Lindsay Cooper – bassoon (3 & 5)
- Mont Campbell – French horn (3 & 4)
