= Short Wave Live =

Live album by Short Wave
- Released: 1993
- Recorded: 1991/92
- Genre: Jazz / Rock
- Label: Gimini / Voiceprint
- Producer: ?

Short Wave Live is the only album by Short Wave, a UK band related to the Canterbury Scene, consisting of Hugh Hopper (bass), Didier Malherbe (sax), Phil Miller (guitar) and Pip Pyle (drums).

The band was formed in 1991. Miller and Pyle had been playing together in In Cahoots, which had previously also included Hopper.

In 1993, they released a live album that contains material from concerts in England, 1991 and France, 1992. Short Wave was short lived - all members were also busy in other projects and bands.

The album was reissued on CD in 2005 on Voiceprint Records.

== Track listing ==
1. "The Fox" (Miller)
2. "Saiseyes" (Pyle)
3. "Frankly Speaking" (Hopper)
4. "The Balladin" (Pyle)
5. "2 P.M." (Hopper)
6. "Partout" (Hopper)
7. "Midnight Judo" (Hopper)
8. "Shuffle Demons" (Hopper)
9. "Nan True's Hole" (Miller)
10. "VZG" (Malherbe)
11. "Et Alors..." (Malherbe)

== Personnel ==
- Didier Malherbe - tenor sax, alto sax, soprano sax, flute (formerly of Gong)
- Phil Miller - guitar, guitar synthesizer (formerly of Delivery and In Cahoots)
- Hugh Hopper - bass (formerly of Soft Machine)
- Pip Pyle - drums (also of Gong and In Cahoots)
