= The Battle of Hastings (album) =

Studio album by Caravan
- Released: 28 September 1995
- Recorded: April – May 1995
- Genres: Progressive rock; Canterbury scene; hard rock
- Length: 52:21
- Label: Castle
- Producer: Julian Gordon-Hastings

Caravan chronology
The Best of Caravan – Canterbury Tales (1994)	The Battle of Hastings (1995)	Travelling Man (1998)

Professional ratings
Review scores
Source	Rating
AllMusic	4.0/5 stars

The Battle of Hastings is the twelfth album by the British Canterbury scene progressive rock band Caravan, released in 1995.

== Track listing ==
1. "It's a Sad, Sad Affair" (Pye Hastings) – 3:23
2. "Somewhere in Your Heart" (Hastings) – 5:42
3. "Cold as Ice" (Hastings) – 4:09
4. "Liar" (Hastings) – 6:07
5. "Don't Want Love" (Pye Hastings, Jimmy Hastings) – 6:48
6. "Travelling Ways" (Dave Sinclair) – 3:51
7. "This Time" (Hastings) – 5:19
8. "If It Wasn't for Your Ego" (Hastings) – 3:36
9. "It's Not Real" (Hastings) – 5:29
10. "Wendy Wants Another 6" Mole" (Hastings) – 2:25
11. "I Know Why You're Laughing" (Hastings) – 5:32

== Personnel ==
Caravan

- Pye Hastings – lead vocals, acoustic & electric guitar, Leslie guitar, harmony vocals
- Geoff Richardson – viola, violin, clarinet, acoustic & electric guitar, mandolin, tambourine, wind, kalimba, shaker, amplifiers, harmony vocals
- Dave Sinclair – keyboards, harmony vocals
- Jim Leverton – bass guitar, harmony vocals; lead vocals on "Travelling Ways"
- Richard Coughlan – drums

Additional personnel

- Jimmy Hastings – flute, piccolo flute, alto flute, bass flute, clarinet, soprano sax, tenor sax

== Releases information ==
- 1999: Castle 520
- 1996: CD HTD 41
- 2002: CD Castle 72042
- 1995: CD Castle 41
