= Barbara Gaskin =

British singer (born 1950)

- Gaskin performing with Spirogyra in 1971

Background information
- Born: 5 June 1950 (age 75); Hatfield, Hertfordshire
- Origin: Hatfield, Hertfordshire, England
- Genres: Pop rock, folk, synth-pop
- Occupation: Singer
- Years active: 1969–present
- Labels: Broken, Stiff
- Website: Dave Stewart & Barbara Gaskin website

Barbara Gaskin (born 5 June 1950) is an English singer formerly associated with the UK Canterbury scene.

Gaskin was lead vocalist in British folk-prog band Spirogyra (1969–1974). From 1973 to 1976, she sang backing vocals with Dave Stewart's band Hatfield and the North, as one-third of the Northettes (with Ann Rosenthal and Amanda Parsons, both since retired from music). In 1981, she and Stewart formed a duo, and later in October of that year, they had a number one single in the UK with a cover of the Lesley Gore song "It's My Party". Subsequent singles "Busy Doing Nothing" (1983) and "The Locomotion" (1986) also entered the UK Singles Chart, without reaching the heights of their debut release. Seven albums followed, released on the duo's own Broken Records label. Gaskin and Stewart continue to work together and occasionally play live concerts with Andy Reynolds (guitar, 1990–2009), Beren Matthews (guitar, 2018 onwards) and drummer Gavin Harrison (Tokyo 2001 and London 2018 concerts). Gaskin has also sung with Egg (The Civil Surface), National Health, Peter Blegvad (The Naked Shakespeare), Phil Miller, Nigel Planer (Neil's Heavy Concept Album), Jane Wiedlin (Tangled), Rick Biddulph and Mont Campbell (Music from a Round Tower).

== History ==
Barbara Gaskin was born and grew up in Hatfield, Hertfordshire, England. She had formal training in piano and cello from the age of 10. In her early teens she taught herself very basic acoustic guitar (Lesson 1: The strings face outwards) and performed in local folk clubs.

In 1969, she moved from Hatfield to Canterbury to study for a degree in Philosophy and Literature at University of Kent at Canterbury, but immediately became involved in the Canterbury music scene, joining folk rock group Spirogyra as vocalist. Spirogyra quickly procured a recording contract and subsequently made 3 albums, namely:- 'St Radigunds' B & C Records (CAS 1042), 'Old Boot Wine' Pegasus Records (PEG 13), and 'Bells, Boots, & Shambles' Polydor (2310 246), while gigging extensively on the UK college circuit, as well as completing numerous successful tours of Europe. During the same period, Gaskin met guitarist Steve Hillage (also a student at Kent University) and via Hillage, the members of Canterbury band Caravan, and Hillage's old friend and musical colleague Dave Stewart. Gaskin guested both live and on record with Stewart's band 'Hatfield & The North', and was a member of the 'Ottawa Music Company', brainchild of Dave Stewart and 'Henry Cow' drummer Chris Cutler. The intricate, largely instrumental music of bands such as Egg, Hatfield & The North and Henry Cow, and by contrast, the more spontaneous, lyrically driven approach of Spirogyra, were both powerful formative musical influences on Gaskin during the six years she lived in Canterbury.

When Spirogyra split up, Gaskin left England to travel in Asia for nearly three years, following her interest in Eastern philosophy and culture while earning money by teaching English. She continued to sing – in Japan, professionally – and while living in Java and Bali became very interested in gamelan music. She also lived in India for a total of 18 months.

On returning to England, Gaskin was invited by drummer Germaine Dolan to play keyboards and sing in the all female band Red Roll On. Based in Canterbury, the band played in clubs and art colleges in the London area. But Gaskin also renewed her musical association with Dave Stewart by contributing vocals to his compositions on Bill Bruford's "Gradually Going Tornado" album. In 1981 Gaskin and Stewart joined forces and recorded the hit single "It's My Party". The collaboration has continued to this day with a series of singles and albums on their own Broken Records label and Rykodisc Records. After 40 years together, in 2021 Gaskin and Stewart were finally married.

== Discography ==
=== With Spirogyra ===
- St. Radigunds (B&C, 1971)
- Old Boot Wine (B&C, 1972)
- Bells, Boots and Shambles (B&C, 1973)
- Burn The Bridges (Repertoire, 2000)

=== With Hatfield and the North ===
- Hatfield and the North (Virgin, 1973)
- The Rotters' Club (Virgin, 1975)
- Afters (Virgin, 1980)
- Hatwise Choice (2005)
- Hattitude (2006)

=== With Egg ===
- The Civil Surface (Virgin, 1974)
- The Metronomical Society (2007)

=== With National Health ===
- D.S. Al Coda (1982)
- National Health Complete (1990)
- Missing Pieces (1994)

=== With Bill Bruford ===
- Gradually Going Tornado (Polydor, 1980)

=== With Peter Blegvad ===
- The Naked Shakespeare (Virgin, 1983)

=== With Nigel Planer ===
- Neil's Heavy Concept Album (1984)

=== With Phil Miller ===
- Cutting Both Ways (Cuneiform, 1989)

=== With Jane Wiedlin ===
- Tangled (1990)

=== With Rick Biddulph ===
- Second Nature (Voiceprint, 1994)

=== With Dirk Mont Campbell ===
- Music from a Round Tower (Resurgence, 1996)
- Music from a Walled Garden (MFA, 2009)

=== Singles / EPs with Dave Stewart ===
- "It's My Party" (Broken, 1981) (Note: Released with Stiff Records)
- "Johnny Rocco" (Broken, 1982)
- "Siamese Cat Song" (Broken, 1983)
- "Busy Doing Nothing" (Broken, 1983)
- "Leipzig" (Broken, 1983)
- "I'm in a Different World" (Broken, 1984)
- "The Locomotion" (Broken, 1986)
- "Walking the Dog" (Line (Germany) 1992)
- Hour Moon (EP) (Broken, 2009)

=== Albums with Dave Stewart ===
- Up from the Dark (compilation), Rykodisc (USA) RCD 10011 (1986)
- Broken Records – The Singles, MIDI Records (Japan) (1987)
- As Far as Dreams Can Go, MIDI Records (Japan) (1988)
- The Big Idea, Rykodisc RCD 20172 / MIDI Records (1989)
- Spin, Rykodisc RCD 20213 / MIDI Records (1991)
- Selected Tracks (compilation), Musidisc (France) / Disky (Holland) (1993)
- Green and Blue, Broken Records BRCDLP-05 (March 2009)
- The TLG Collection, Broken Records BRCDLP-06 (October 2009)
- Broken Records – The Singles (Special Edition), Broken Records BRCDLP-01 (November 2010)
- As Far as Dreams Can Go (Special Edition), Broken Records BRCDLP-02 (November 2010)
- The Big Idea (Special Edition), Broken Records BRCDLP-03 (December 2011)
- Spin (Special Edition), Broken Records BRCDLP-04 (December 2011)
- Star Clocks, Broken Records BRCDLP-07 (September 2018)
