= Hatfield and the North (album) =

Studio album by Hatfield and the North
- Released: 1 March 1974
- Recorded: October 1973 – January 1974
- Genre: Canterbury scene
- Length: 46:10
- Label: Virgin
- Producers: Hatfield and the North; Tom Newman

Hatfield and the North chronology
Hatfield and the North (1974)	The Rotters' Club (1975)

Professional ratings
Review scores
Source	Rating
AllMusic	4/5 stars

Hatfield and the North is the first album by the English Canterbury scene rock band Hatfield and the North, released on 1 March 1974.

In the Q & Mojo Classic Special Edition Pink Floyd & The Story of Prog Rock, the album came #34 in its list of "40 Cosmic Rock Albums". In 2025, French label Musea Records released a new vinyl reissue of the album, the first since 1982.

== Album cover ==
The cover of the original vinyl release was designed by Laurie Lewis. The front and back outer cover is a panoramic photograph of Reykjavík, with the sky on the right merged with a transparency of a 15th-16th century fresco in Orvieto Cathedral by Luca Signorelli, "The Damned". The inside gatefold is a collage that includes photographs of the personnel and guests involved in the music, the cast of the TV show Bonanza, together with a cropped photograph by Jacques Henri Lartigue of a man throwing a dog.

== Track listing ==
Side one
No.	Title	Writer(s)	Length
1.	"The Stubbs Effect"	Pip Pyle	0:22
2.	"Big Jobs (Poo Poo Extract)"	Richard Sinclair, Pyle	0:36
3.	"Going Up To People and Tinkling"	Dave Stewart	2:25
4.	"Calyx"	Phil Miller	2:45
5.	"Son of 'There's No Place Like Homerton'"	Stewart	10:10
6.	"Aigrette"	Miller	1:37
7.	"Rifferama"	Sinclair; arr. Hatfield and the North	2:56

Side two
No.	Title	Writer(s)	Length
8.	"Fol de Rol"	Sinclair, Robert Wyatt	3:07
9.	"Shaving Is Boring"	Pyle	8:45
10.	"Licks for the Ladies"	Sinclair, Pyle	2:37
11.	"Bossa Nochance"	Sinclair	0:40
12.	"Big Jobs No. 2 (By Poo and the Wee Wees)"	Sinclair, Pyle	2:14
13.	"Lobster in Cleavage Probe"	Stewart	3:57
14.	"Gigantic Land Crabs in Earth Takeover Bid"	Stewart	3:21
15.	"The Other Stubbs Effect"	Pyle	0:38

The 1987 CD re-release of the album added two bonus tracks, the A- and B-sides of a 1974 single, previously available on the 1980 compilation Afters:

1. "Let's Eat (Real Soon)" (Sinclair, Pyle) – 3:16
2. "Fitter Stoke Has a Bath" (Pyle) – 4:35

The 2009 Esoteric Recordings reissue (ECLEC2139) also included the above, along with a further bonus track:

1. "Your Majesty Is Like a Cream Donut Incorporating Oh What a Lonely Lifetime" – 6:08

Taken from the Virgin Records Sampler (VD 2502) from January 1975.

== Personnel ==
Hatfield and the North

- Phil Miller – electric guitar (2–14), acoustic guitars (6)
- Dave Stewart – Fender Rhodes electric piano (1–8, 10–15), Hammond organ (3–5, 7–9, 12–14), Hohner Pianet (1, 5, 7, 9, 13–15), piano (2–5, 8, 9), tone generator (5, 7–9, 12), Minimoog (9)
- Richard Sinclair – bass guitar (2–14), vocals (2, 4, 6, 8, 10–12)
- Pip Pyle – drums (2–9, 11–14), percussion (6, 7, 9), sound effects (7–9, 11)

Guest musicians

- Robert Wyatt – vocals (4, 12)
- Barbara Gaskin – vocals (5, 13)
- Amanda Parsons – vocals (5, 13)
- Ann Rosenthal – vocals (5, 13)
- Geoff Leigh – tenor saxophone (5), flute (5, 13)
- Didier Malherbe – tenor saxophone (7) (uncredited)
- Jeremy Baines – pixiephone (5), flute (13)
- Sam Ellidge – voice (7)
- Cyrille Ayers – vocals (8)
