= Phil Lee =

English jazz guitarist

Phillip Robert Lee (born 8 April 1943, London, England. Died 12 May 2024) was an English jazz guitarist.

Lee studied guitar with Ike Isaacs as a teenager and was a member of the National Youth Jazz Orchestra, including for their performance at the 1960 Antibes Jazz Festival. Later in the 1960s he played with John C. Williams and Graham Collier and in a band that included Bob Stuckey, Dudu Pukwana, and John Marshall.

During the 1970s, he played in jazz-rock bands such as Gilgamesh and Axel with Tony Coe and with Michael Garrick, Henry Lowther, and John Stevens. He recorded Twice Upon a Time (1987) with Jeff Clyne. Later in his career he worked with Gordon Beck, Andres Boiarsky, Benny Goodman, Lena Horne, Marian Montgomery, Annie Ross, and the London Jazz Orchestra.

== Other sources ==
- Mark Gilbert, "Phil Lee". The New Grove Dictionary of Jazz. Second edition, ed. Barry Kernfeld.
