= National Health =

English progressive rock band

- Origin: Canterbury, England
- Genres: Progressive rock, Canterbury scene
- Years active: 1975–1980, 1981, 1983
- Past members: Dave Stewart; Alan Gowen; Amanda Parsons; Phil Miller; Phil Lee; Mont Campbell; Bill Bruford; Steve Hillage; John Mitchell; Neil Murray; Pip Pyle; John Greaves; Georgie Born; Lindsay Cooper

National Health were an English progressive rock band associated with the Canterbury scene. Founded in 1975, the band featured members of keyboardist Dave Stewart's band Hatfield and the North and Alan Gowen's band Gilgamesh, including guitarists Phil Miller and Phil Lee and bassist Mont Campbell as original members. The band was named after Stewart's National Health spectacles. Bill Bruford (previously of Yes and King Crimson) was the initial drummer, soon replaced by Pip Pyle. Campbell was replaced by Neil Murray and then John Greaves. Alan Gowen left the group before its first album (although he appeared on it as a guest musician), but returned for their final tours, replacing Dave Stewart, who resigned after their second album. Amanda Parsons sang with the group in its original line-up but also appeared on the first album only as a guest; the group never had another full-time vocalist, although Richard Sinclair sang a few times, and Greaves sang on one track of the second album and occasionally in concerts. Guitarist Phil Miller was National Health's only constant member.

They toured extensively and released their first album, National Health, in 1978. Although it was created during the rise of punk rock, the album is characterized by lengthy, mostly instrumental compositions. National Health continued performing live until winter 1980, but disbanded after recording only two studio albums.

After the May 1981 death of Gowen, the Queues lineup of Stewart, Miller, Greaves and Pyle reunited to record the album D.S. Al Coda, a set of compositions by Gowen, most previously unrecorded. The original albums and additional archival material have subsequently been released on CD.

The intro of National Health's "Binoculars" was used as a sample on American rock band Deftones' "Black Moon".

== Line-ups ==
July – September 1975	October – December 1975	December 1975 – January 1976	January – March 1976
Dave Stewart – keyboards; Alan Gowen – keyboards; Phil Miller – guitar; Phil Lee – guitar; Mont Campbell – bass; Amanda Parsons – vocals	Dave Stewart – keyboards; Alan Gowen – keyboards; Phil Miller – guitar; Phil Lee – guitar; Mont Campbell – bass; Amanda Parsons – vocals; Bill Bruford – drums, percussion	Dave Stewart – keyboards; Alan Gowen – keyboards; Phil Miller – guitar; Mont Campbell – bass; Amanda Parsons – vocals; Richard Burgess – drums, percussion	Dave Stewart – keyboards; Alan Gowen – keyboards; Phil Miller – guitar; Mont Campbell – bass; Amanda Parsons – vocals; Steve Hillage – guitar; Bill Bruford – drums, percussion
March – June 1976	July 1976 – January 1977	January – March 1977	March 1977 – January 1978
Dave Stewart – keyboards; Alan Gowen – keyboards; Phil Miller – guitar; Mont Campbell – bass; Amanda Parsons – vocals; John Mitchell – drums, percussion	Dave Stewart – keyboards; Alan Gowen – keyboards; Phil Miller – guitar; Amanda Parsons – vocals; Bill Bruford – drums percussion; Neil Murray – bass	Dave Stewart – keyboards; Alan Gowen – keyboards; Phil Miller – guitar; Amanda Parsons – vocals; Neil Murray – bass; Pip Pyle – drums, percussion	Dave Stewart – keyboards; Phil Miller – guitar; Neil Murray – bass; Pip Pyle – drums, percussion
January – September 1978	September – October 1978	January 1979 – March 1980	March 1980 – October 1981
Dave Stewart – keyboards; Phil Miller – guitar; Pip Pyle – drums, percussion; John Greaves – bass	Dave Stewart – keyboards; Phil Miller – guitar; Pip Pyle – drums, percussion; John Greaves – bass; Georgie Born – cello; Lindsay Cooper – bassoon	Phil Miller – guitar; Pip Pyle – drums, percussion; John Greaves – bass; Alan Gowen – keyboards; Dave Stewart took part in a performance of "The Collapso" on BBC's The Old Grey Whistle Test in January 1979, before being replaced by Alan Gowen.	Disbanded
October – November 1981	November 1981 – August 1983	August 1983
Phil Miller – guitar; Pip Pyle – drums; John Greaves – bass; Dave Stewart – keyboards	Disbanded	Phil Miller – guitar; Pip Pyle – drums; John Greaves – bass; Dave Stewart – keyboards; Guests: Elton Dean – saxophone; Jimmy Hastings – flute; Barbara Gaskin – vocals

== Discography ==
=== Studio albums ===
- National Health (1978)
- Of Queues and Cures (1978)
- D.S. Al Coda (1982)

=== Other releases ===
- Complete (1990; all three studio albums plus bonus tracks)
- Missing Pieces (1996; archival material)
- Playtime (2001; live recordings from 1979)
- Dreams Wide Awake (2005; all tracks from the first two studio albums)

== Filmography ==
- 2015: Romantic Warriors III: Canterbury Tales (DVD)
