= Alan Gowen =

British musician (1947–1981)

Alan Gowen (19 August 1947 – 17 May 1981) was an English fusion/progressive rock keyboardist, best known for his work in Gilgamesh and National Health.

== History ==
Gowen was born in Hampstead, northwest London. He joined Assagai in 1971 before going on to found Sunship in 1972 with Jamie Muir (drums, also from Assagai) and Laurie Baker (bass). The band also included Allan Holdsworth on guitar.

He formed Gilgamesh in 1973 and started a collaboration with Hatfield and the North, eventually founding National Health with Hatfield and the North's keyboardist Dave Stewart in 1975. Gowen left National Health in 1977, though returned briefly for the recording sessions of their first album.

In 1978, Gowen formed Soft Heap with Elton Dean, Hugh Hopper, and Pip Pyle. With Dave Sheen replacing Pyle, the band toured as Soft Head in the summer of 1978. He also recorded a second Gilgamesh album that year.

Gowen re-joined National Health in 1979-1980 and also continued with Soft Heap in this period. Before a Word is Said (1981), recorded with Richard Sinclair (bass, briefly in Gilgamesh), Phil Miller (guitar, from National Health) and Trevor Tomkins (drums, from Gilgamesh), was the last album Gowen recorded before his death from leukaemia in 1981.

== Discography ==
- 1975 Gilgamesh - Gilgamesh
- 1978 National Health - National Health
- 1978 Soft Head - Rogue Element
- 1978 Gilgamesh - Another Fine Tune You've Got Me Into
- 1979 Soft Heap - Soft Heap
- 1980 Hugh Hopper & Alan Gowen - Two Rainbows Daily (CD reissue includes one half of 1980 live recording with Nigel Morris)
- 1981 Alan Gowen, Phil Miller, Richard Sinclair, Trevor Tomkins - Before A Word Is Said
- 1982 National Health - D.S. al Coda (tribute album featuring Gowen compositions)
- 1995 National Health - Missing Pieces (1975-6 recordings)
- 1996 Alan Gowen & Hugh Hopper - Bracknell-Bresse Improvisations (duo recordings from 1978; also contains remainder of above-mentioned 1980 live recording)
- 2000 Gilgamesh - Arriving Twice (1973-5 recordings)
- 2001 National Health - Playtime (1979 recordings)
- 2008 Soft Heap - Al Dente (1978 live recording)

== Sources ==
- Calyx on Alan Gowen
