= Pip Pyle =

English drummer (1950–2006)

Phillip "Pip" Pyle (4 April 1950 – 28 August 2006) was an English-born drummer from Sawbridgeworth, Hertfordshire, who later resided in France. He is best known for his work in the Canterbury scene bands Gong, Hatfield and the North and National Health.

== Biography ==
Pyle joined Phil Miller, a friend from kindergarten, and Phil's brother Steve, in forming Bruno's Blues Band, which rapidly evolved into Delivery. However, Pyle left the band in 1970 after arguing with singer Carol Grimes. He briefly played in blues band Chicken Shack and Steve Hillage's band Khan.

In 1971, drummer Robert Wyatt asked Pyle to play instead of him on one track of Daevid Allen's solo album Banana Moon. From this, Pyle joined Allen in Gong. While only in the band for eight months, Pyle played on both Camembert Électrique and Continental Circus. Pyle was replaced by Laurie Allan, but rejoined Gong in 1989.

In 1972, Pyle worked with Paul Jones (who had been singing with Manfred Mann) and with British singer Bridget St John, before founding Hatfield and the North with the Miller brothers and Richard Sinclair in 1972. Steve Miller was soon replaced by Dave Sinclair (Richard's cousin, from the band Caravan) before finalizing on the lineup of Pyle, Phil Miller, Richard Sinclair and keyboardist Dave Stewart. Hatfield and the North was released in 1974, while a second album, The Rotters' Club, followed the next year. As well as drumming, Pyle wrote many of the band's lyrics.

Following Hatfield, Pyle joined Miller and Stewart in National Health as well as playing in other projects, including Soft Heap with Hugh Hopper, Elton Dean and Alan Gowen. He also played on Neil's Heavy Concept Album (1984), a spin-off from the television series The Young Ones with which Stewart was involved.

In 1984, Pyle met Sophia Domancich and the two had a relationship until 1990. Pyle also started his own band, Pip Pyle's Equip'Out, including Domancich. Equip'Out released Equip'Out, Up! and Instants. He released one solo album, Seven Year Itch, in 1998 with guests including Miller, Sinclair, Stewart, Dean (saxello), Hopper (bass), Jakko Jakszyk, Barbara Gaskin, John Greaves (vocals), François Ovide, Fred T. Baker (bass), Paul Rogers (double bass), Lydia Domancich (piano, Sophia's sister) and Didier Malherbe (alto sax). Pyle also played in Miller's band In Cahoots from 1982 to 2001, appearing on Cutting Both Ways, Split Seconds, Live 86-89, Live in Japan, Recent Discoveries, Parallel and Out of the Blue.

His last projects were his group Bash!, featuring the French guitarist Patrice Meyer, Fred Baker on bass and Alex Maguire on keyboards, and a Hatfield and the North reunion (also with Maguire). Bash! released the live album Belle Illusion (Cuneiform Records), but only played five live shows in total (including Progman Cometh), finding it difficult to attract interest from venues.

In 2005 Pyle joined Phil Miller and Richard Sinclair in a re-formation of Hatfield and the North, with Alex Maguire handling the keyboards. On 29 January, all three were reunited for the first time in fifteen years when Pyle sat in with the Richard Sinclair Band for a few old numbers ("Above And Below", "Share It", "Halfway Between Heaven And Earth" and "Didn't Matter Anyway") during a gig at Whitstable's Horsebridge Arts Centre. The rejuvenated Hatfield made its official live debut on 18 March 2005 at the Mean Fiddler in London, and a brief tour of Europe followed in June. More international touring followed in 2005–06, including dates in Japan, Mexico, the US and Europe. On 26 August 2006 Pyle played his last gig in Feerwerd (Groningen), Netherlands.

He died in Paris on 28 August 2006.

== Solo Discography ==
- 1986: L'Équipe Out (52e Rue Est)
- 1991: Equip' Out Up! (NTI Music 3 TMR 301)
- 1998: 7 Year Itch (Voiceprint VP198CD)
- 1999: Pip Pyle's Equipe Out (Voiceprint VP213CD) (re-issue of 1st album)
- 2004: Belle Illusion (Cuneiform Rune 193) (partially recorded at Progman Cometh)
- 2004: Instants (Hux 062)

== Chronology ==
- 1966 - 1971 Delivery
- 1971 - 1971 Chicken Shack
- 1971 - 1971 Khan
- 1971 - 1971 Gong
- 1972 - 1975 Hatfield and the North
- 1975 - 1976 The Weightwatchers (with Elton Dean and Keith Tippett)
- 1977 - 1983 National Health
- 1977 - 1988 Soft Heap
- 1980 - 1981 Rapid Eye Movement
- 1982 - 2002 In Cahoots
- 1984 - 1995 Pip Pyle's Equip'Out
- 1989 - 1996 Gong reformed
- 1991 - 1996 Short Wave
- 1999 - 2006 Absolute Zero
- 2002 - 2006 Pip Pyle's Bash!
- 2005 - 2006 Hatfield and the North reformed

== Filmography ==
- 2015: Romantic Warriors III: Canterbury Tales (DVD)
