= Hatwise Choice: Archive Recordings 1973–1975, Volume 1 =

Compilation album by Hatfield and the North
- Released: January 2005
- Recorded: 1973–1975
- Genres: Progressive rock, Canterbury scene
- Length: 1:08:47
- Label: Hatco/Burning Shed

Hatfield and the North chronology
Live 1990 (1993)	Hatwise Choice: Archive Recordings 1973–1975, Volume 1 (2005)	Hattitude: Archive Recordings 1973-1975, Volume 2 (2006)

Hatwise Choice: Archive Recordings 1973–1975, Volume 1 is a 2005 compilation album by Canterbury scene band Hatfield and the North. The compilation features a mixture of on-stage live recordings, performances for radio, and a demo.

== Track listing ==
No.	Title	Writer(s)	Show	Length
1.	"Absolutely Wholesome"	Sinclair	John Peel Show 1974	3:16
2.	"La barbe est la barbe"	Sinclair	Top Gear 1974	6:51
3.	"Sober Song"	Sinclair	Top Gear 1974	2:59
4.	"Hatitude"	Sinclair, Stewart, Miller, Pyle	John Peel Show 1974	3:13
5.	"Strand on the Green"	Stewart	John Peel Show 1974	1:02
6.	"Hotel Luna"	Stewart	John Peel Show 1974	3:34
7.	"The Lonely Bubbling Song"	Sinclair	John Peel Show 1974	1:20
8.	"Stay Jung and Beautiful"	Stewart	John Peel Show 1974	0:56
9.	"Dave Intro"	Stewart	Live - London 1975	1:55
10.	"Take Your Pick"	Sinclair	Live - London 1975	8:09
11.	"Son Of Plate Smashing Dog"	Sinclair, Stewart, Miller, Pyle	Live - Emmen 1974	1:16
12.	"Thanks Mont!"	Stewart	Live - Emmen 1974	2:27
13.	"Amsterdamage 11/19"	Stewart	Live - Amsterdam 1974	6:20
14.	"May The Farce Be With You"	Sinclair, Stewart, Miller, Pyle	Live - Paris 1973	0:39
15.	"Finesse is for Fairies"	Miller	Sounds of the 70s 1973	1:28
16.	"Ethanol Nurse"	Miller	Sounds of the 70s 1973	2:56
17.	"Writhing and Grimacing"	Miller	Sounds of the 70s 1973	3:42
18.	"For Robert"	Sinclair	Top Gear 1973	2:09
19.	"Blane over Paris"	Sinclair, Stewart, Miller, Pyle	Live - Paris 1973	6:20
20.	"Laundry Soup"	Stewart	Top Gear 1974	0:57
21.	"Effing Mad Aincha"	Sinclair, Stewart, Miller, Pyle	Live - Rotterdam 1973	2:58
22.	"Top Gear Commercial"	Stewart	Top Gear 1974	1:22
23.	"K Licks"	Miller	Demo - Summer 1973	2:58
