= Hatfield and the North =

English rock band

- Origin: Canterbury, England
- Genres: Canterbury scene
- Years active: 1972–1975; 1990; 2005–2006
- Spinoff of: Delivery
- Past members: Phil Miller; Pip Pyle; Richard Sinclair; Steve Miller; Dave Sinclair; Dave Stewart

Hatfield and the North were an experimental Canterbury scene rock band that lasted from October 1972 to June 1975, with some reunions thereafter.

== Career ==
In mid 1972, the band grew out of a line-up of ex-members of blues/jazz/rock band Delivery, Pip Pyle (drums, who had since played with Gong), Phil Miller (guitar, who had joined Matching Mole), and Phil's brother Steve Miller (Wurlitzer electronic piano, who had joined Caravan). Replacing Roy Babbington on bass was Richard Sinclair (who played with Steve Miller in Caravan). This line-up moved away from the blues idiom of the early Delivery towards pieces based on riffs in odd time signatures and protracted melodies associated with the Canterbury style.

The band played a few live shows between July and September that year, and gained their first record contract with Virgin Records with the 'Sinclair cousins'...as Steve Miller was replaced by Dave Sinclair (Hammond organ, also from Matching Mole and Caravan), the band soon changed their name to Hatfield and the North.

Delivery reunited for a BBC session in November 1972 with Steve Miller, Phil Miller, Lol Coxhill, Roy Babbington (bass), Pip Pyle, and Richard Sinclair on vocals. (Steve Miller went on to release a couple of duo albums with Coxhill in 1973/74.)

Dave Sinclair left in January 1973, shortly after the band's appearance (with Robert Wyatt on guest vocals) on the French TV programme Rockenstock, and was replaced by Dave Stewart (from Egg) before the band's first recordings were made.

The band recorded two albums: Hatfield and the North (1974) and The Rotters' Club (1975). Backing vocals on the two albums were sung by The Northettes: Amanda Parsons, Barbara Gaskin (who was born in Hatfield, the town in Hertfordshire referred to in the group's name), and Ann Rosenthal. On the autumn 1974 "Crisis Tour", which Hatfield co-headlined with Kevin Coyne, the opening act was a duo of Steve Miller and Lol Coxhill (also previously of Delivery) and Coxhill usually guested with Hatfield on the jamming sections of "Mumps".

After disbanding, Dave Stewart formed National Health with Alan Gowen from Gilgamesh; Phil Miller was a member throughout that band's existence, and Pyle joined in 1977. (Richard Sinclair also sat in on a couple of gigs and a BBC radio session that year.) Hatfield and the North and Gilgamesh had played a couple of shows together in late 1973, including a joint "double quartet" set, in some ways the prototype for National Health. Miller, Stewart, Pyle, and Sinclair also worked together in various combinations on other projects.

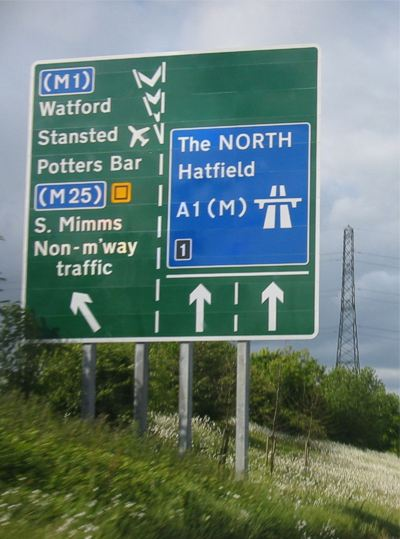
2002 roadsign marking "The NORTH, Hatfield"

The name of the band was inspired by the road signage on the main A1 road heading north from London, where there are a succession of signs (such as that formerly at the junction outside the Odeon cinema in Barnet) referred to the first major town, and the overall direction, as 'A1 Hatfield & the North'. This style of sign from the 1970s has now been replaced by a slightly different variant, reading "The NORTH, Hatfield".

== Reunions and archival releases ==
In March 1990, the group reformed to record a television programme at Central Studios, Nottingham on 30 March, with Phil Miller, Richard Sinclair, and Pip Pyle joined by Sophia Domancich (keyboards, Pyle's then-girlfriend and bandmate in Equip'Out). A live album from that show, titled Live 1990, was released in November 1993.

In January 2005, the band reformed again with Alex Maguire (from Pip Pyle's Bash!) on keyboards and toured between 2005 and 2006 (notable appearances included a short Japanese tour in late 2005, and the Baja Prog and NEARfest festivals in North America). On a small number of European dates in June 2005, Mark Fletcher (from Miller's In Cahoots band) reinforced the band while Pyle was recuperating from a back operation and only played on part of each gig. Pyle died in August 2006 after travelling back from a Hatfield show in Groningen. Following Pyle's death, Hatfield played two previously booked gigs with Mark Fletcher on drums, including the Canterbury Festival in October 2006.

In 2005/2006, the band released two archival collections, Hatwise Choice: Archive Recordings 1973–1975, Volume 1 and Hattitude: Archive Recordings 1973–1975, Volume 2, featuring the classic Miller/Pyle/Sinclair/Stewart line-up, distributed by the UK label Burning Shed. Both releases contained a mixture of BBC radio sessions and live recordings, along with the odd demo, which are still available on CD and support the musicians and family of Pip Pyle.

In 2007, Cuneiform Records re-released two albums by Steve Miller and Lol Coxhill with bonus material including 20 minutes of material by the proto-Hatfield and the North line-up of Delivery playing "God Song", "Bossa Nochance/Big Jobs", and "Betty" (a variation on some of the Sinclair bass riffs that also produced Hatfield's "Rifferama").

Jonathan Coe's 2001 novel The Rotters' Club takes its title from the band's second album. The novel also mentions them several times.

Saint Etienne also reference the band in the track "Popmaster" on their 2017 album Home Counties.

In 2022, Richard Sinclair assembled a tribute band of Hatfield and the North, with a particular dedication to Phil Miller and Pip Pyle. The group that made its debut in Palermo on 10 December 2022 was called the HAT Band, and included Richard Sinclair (vocals and bass), Alex Maguire (electric piano), Mezz Gacano (guitar and backing vocals), and Giulio Scavuzzo (drums).

== Discography ==
- Hatfield and the North (studio LP, Virgin 1974; CD, Virgin 1990)
- Let's Eat (Real Soon) / Fitter Stoke Has a Bath (single, Virgin VS116, 1974)
- The Rotters' Club (studio LP, Virgin 1975; CD, Virgin 1990) – UK No. 43
- Afters (Virgin, 1980)
- Live 1990 (live CD, Demon, 1993)
- Hatwise Choice: Archive Recordings 1973–1975, Volume 1 (Hatco CD73-7501, distributed by Burning Shed, 2005)
- Hattitude: Archive Recordings 1973–1975, Volume 2 (Hatco CD73-7502, distributed by Burning Shed, 2006)
- Hatfield and the North (vinyl reissue, Musea Records, 2025)
- Live in Japan 2005 ～ The Rotters' Live Box (VIVID SOUND, 2025)

== Filmography ==
- 2015: Romantic Warriors III: Canterbury Tales (DVD)
