= Richard Sinclair =

English bassist, guitarist, and vocalist (born 1948)

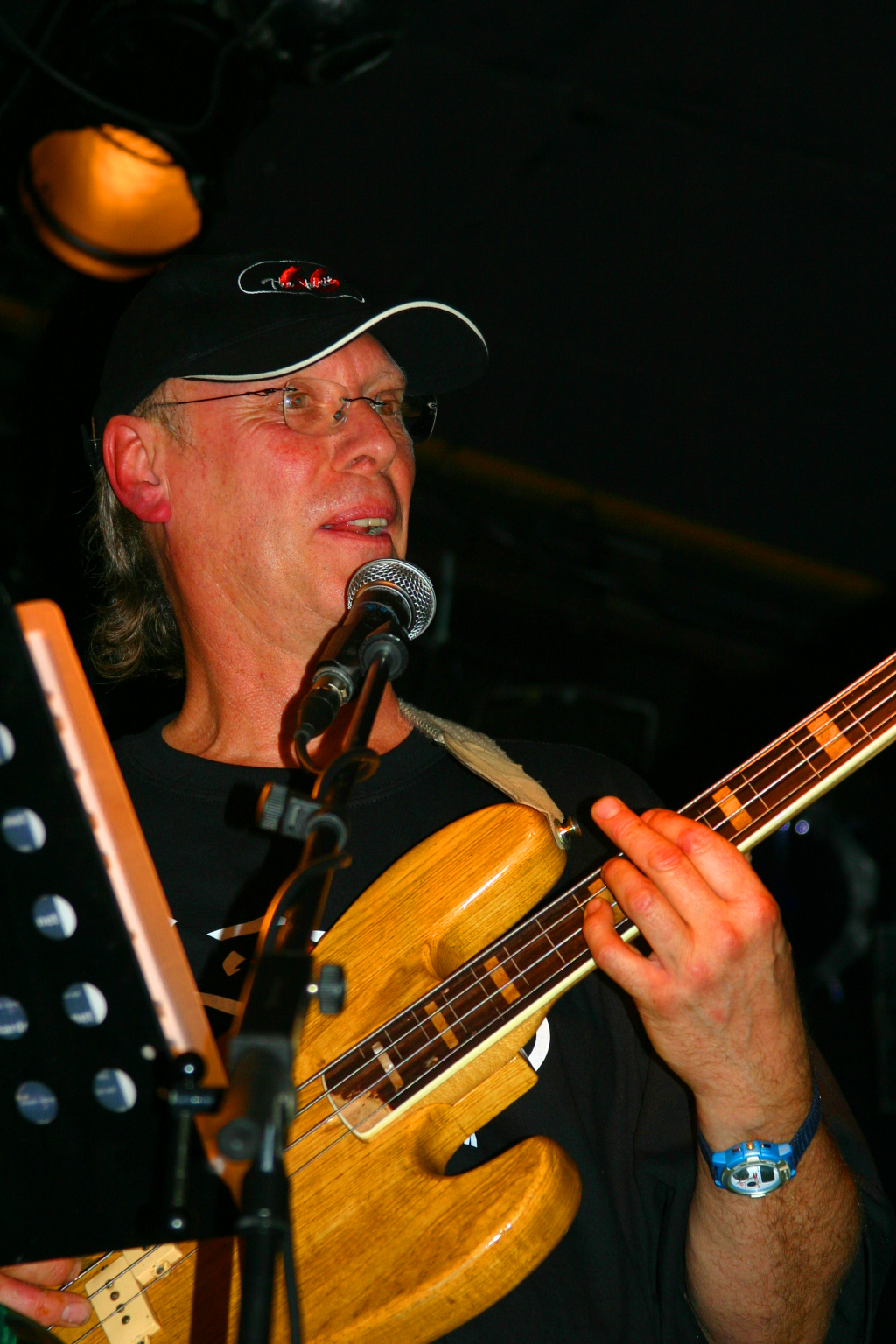

Background information
- Born: Richard Stephen Sinclair; 6 June 1948 (age 78)
- Origin: Canterbury, England
- Genres: Progressive rock, Canterbury scene
- Instruments: Bass guitar, vocals, guitar
- Years active: 1963–present
- Website: Richard Sinclair BandCamp

Richard Stephen Sinclair (born 6 June 1948) is an English progressive rock bassist, guitarist, and vocalist who has been a member of several bands of the Canterbury scene.

== Biography ==
Born in Canterbury, England, both his father (Dick Sinclair) and grandfather (also named Dick Sinclair) were musical entertainers around Canterbury. Richard was introduced to the ukulele at age 3 and the guitar at 6, and was only 15 when he met Hugh and Brian Hopper when they came to see his dad's danceband. By the following year Sinclair was playing guitar (and occasionally singing) in the root Canterbury band The Wilde Flowers. In 1968 he became a founding member of Caravan, switching to bass guitar and sharing lead vocals with Pye Hastings. His compositional output came to the fore on the band's third album, the classic In the Land of Grey and Pink, on which he wrote and sang the title track, "Golf Girl" and the epic "Winter Wine". Sinclair left Caravan in 1972 to form Hatfield and the North with ex-Delivery members Phil Miller and Pip Pyle, lending his distinctive, quintessentially English voice and increasingly impressive bass playing skills to their two albums, and writing some of their best-loved songs, "Share It", "Let's Eat (Real Soon)" (both with lyrics by Pip Pyle) and "Halfway Between Heaven and Earth".

In 1974, he participated in Rock Bottom, the second solo album by former Soft Machine drummer Robert Wyatt. The album was produced by Pink Floyd's drummer Nick Mason.

After Hatfield broke up in 1975, Sinclair moved back to Canterbury, starting a carpentry/kitchen-fitting business while maintaining low-key musical activities, often under the humorous moniker Sinclair & The South. He came out of this semi-retirement in 1977 when he was asked by Camel to replace their departed bass player. This stint lasted for two studio albums, a world tour, and half of the live set A Live Record.

In the 1980s, his activities were sporadic. He recorded a collaborative album with Phil Miller and Alan Gowen, Before a Word Is Said, in 1981, reunited with Caravan for the 1982 reunion effort Back to Front, sang on one track of National Health's swansong D.S. Al Coda (also 1982), and joined Phil Miller's In Cahoots, for a residency at the London jazz club the Bull & Gate and, in 1984, a European tour. He left before the band undertook its first official recordings (though studio demos have surfaced). His voice or bass were barely heard until the end of the decade, save for a low-key Dutch tour in 1986 and a guest spot of Phil Miller's album Split Seconds (1989). In 1990, there was a one-off reformation of Hatfield and the North and a longer-term reunion of the original Caravan line-up in 1990-91.

At this point, Sinclair formed his own group Caravan of Dreams, with ex-Camel drummer Andy Ward and former Hatfield roadie Rick Biddulph on bass (live gigs only), plus occasional participation from cousin Dave Sinclair and sax/flautist Jimmy Hastings. Sinclair released the project's eponymous album in 1992. Sinclair's next effort, R.S.V.P. (1994), was recorded with a fluctuating line-up including Pip Pyle, Tony Coe and former Happy the Man keyboardist Kit Watkins. Regular touring stopped in 1996 as Sinclair moved to the Netherlands for a few years. He reappeared in 2002 with occasional concerts and archival live releases, but the most exposure came with the reunion of Hatfield and the North in 2005-06, which came to an abrupt end when Pip Pyle died in August 2006. Shortly after that, he left his longtime Canterbury home to move permanently to Italy, living in a trullo in Martina Franca. In 2010, he joined the trio douBt (Alex Maguire, Michel Delville and Tony Bianco) on the album Never Pet a Burning Dog (Moonjune Records) and toured Japan and Europe with the band. In 2013-2014 he toured Italy with the Italian band PropheXy, recording two live bonus tracks (Disassociation, Golf Girl) for their album Improvviso.

In 2023 Richard listed his entire catalog on BandCamp, including many previously unreleased recordings from Caravan, Camel, and Hatfield and the North.

== Discography ==
| Year | Artist | Title |
| 1962 | various artists | Canterburied Sounds (four volumes, released 1998) |
| 1965 | The Wilde Flowers | The Wilde Flowers (released 1994) |
| 1969 | Caravan | Caravan |
| 1970 | Caravan | If I Could Do It All Over Again, I'd Do It All Over You |
| 1971 | Caravan | In the Land of Grey and Pink |
| 1972 | Caravan | Waterloo Lily |
| 1974 | Hatfield and the North | Hatfield and the North |
| 1974 | Robert Wyatt | Rock Bottom |
| 1975 | Hatfield and the North | The Rotters' Club |
| 1977 | Camel | Rain Dances |
| 1977 | Camel | Unevensongs |
| 1978 | Camel | Breathless |
| 1978 | Camel | A Live Record |
| 1980 | Hatfield and the North | Afters |
| 1981 | Alan Gowen, Phil Miller, Richard Sinclair & Trevor Tomkins | Before a Word Is Said |
| 1982 | National Health | D.S. al coda |
| 1982 | Caravan | Back to Front |
| 1983 | Hugh Hopper & Richard Sinclair | Somewhere in France (released 1996) |
| 1988 | Skaboosh | Freetown |
| 1989 | Phil Miller | Split Seconds |
| 1990 | Hatfield and the North | Live 1990 (one-off reunion, with Sophia Domancich subbing for Dave Stewart |
| 1990 | Hatfield and the North | Classic Rock Legends (DVD) (same show as above) |
| 1990 | Caravan | Classic Rock Legends (DVD) |
| 1992 | Richard Sinclair's Caravan of Dreams | Richard Sinclair's Caravan of Dreams |
| 1993 | Caravan of Dreams | An Evening of Magic |
| 1994 | Richard Sinclair | R.S.V.P. |
| 1996 | Richard Sinclair, David Rees & Tony Coe | What in the World |
| 1998 | Pip Pyle | 7 Year Itch |
| 2002 | Richard Sinclair | Live Tracks |
| 2003 | Camel | Live Tracks |
| 2003 | Dave Sinclair | Full Circle |
| 2003 | Dave Sinclair | Into the Sun |
| 2003 | Theo Travis | Earth to Ether |
| 2005 | Hatfield and the North | Hatwise Choice: Archive Recordings 1973—1975, Volume 1 |
| 2006 | Hatfield and the North | Hattitude: Archive Recordings 1973-1975, Volume 2 |
| 2006 | In Cahoots | Conspiracy Theories |
| 2010 | Doubt | Never pet a burning dog |

== Bandology ==
- 1964–1965 The Wilde Flowers (with Kevin Ayers, Robert Wyatt, Hugh Hopper et al.)
- 1968–1972, 1982 Caravan
- 1972–1975 Hatfield and the North
- 1976 Sinclair and the South
- 1977–1979 Camel
- 1977 National Health
- 1982–1984 In Cahoots
- 1988 Skaboosh
- 1991–93 Caravan of Dreams
- 1994–1996 R.S.V.P. (with Pip Pyle, Didier Malherbe and Patrice Meyer)
- 1995– ? Richard Sinclair Band with Tony Coe and David Rees Williams
- 2005–2006 Hatfield and the North reformed

== Filmography ==
- 2015: Romantic Warriors III: Canterbury Tales (DVD)
- 2001: ‘’Classic Rock Legends: Hatfield & the North’’ (DVD)
- 2001: ‘’Classic Rock Legends: Caravan’’ (DVD)

== External ==
- Richard Sinclair at AllMusic
- Biography at calyx-canterbury.fr
