= Canterbury scene =

British musical scene

- Stylistic origins: Progressive rock; jazz fusion; avant-garde; psychedelic rock; experimental rock
- Cultural origins: Late 1960s, Canterbury, England

Other topics
- Rock in Opposition

The Canterbury scene (or Canterbury sound) is a musical scene that originated in the city of Canterbury, Kent, England during the late 1960s and early 1970s. Associated with progressive rock, the term describes a loosely defined, improvisational style that blended elements of jazz, rock, and psychedelia.

The Canterbury scene was born from the ashes of The Wilde Flowers, a psych-pop outfit active in the mid to late 60s. After the band broke up in 1969, its members soon went on to play together in numerous bands (e.g. Soft Machine, Caravan, Gong, Hatfield and the North, Egg, and National Health), with ever-changing and overlapping personnel, creating some similarities in their musical output. Many prominent British avant-garde or fusion musicians began their career in Canterbury bands, including Hugh Hopper, Steve Hillage, Dave Stewart, Robert Wyatt, Kevin Ayers, Richard Sinclair, Tony Coe, Daevid Allen, and Mike Ratledge.

== Definition and history ==
The Canterbury scene is largely defined by a set of musicians and bands with intertwined members. These are not tied by very strong musical similarities, but a certain whimsicality, touches of psychedelia, rather abstruse lyrics, and a use of improvisation derived from jazz are common elements in their work. "The real essence of 'Canterbury Sound' is the tension between complicated harmonies, extended improvisations, and the sincere desire to write catchy pop songs." "In the very best Canterbury music...the musically silly and the musically serious are juxtaposed in an amusing and endearing way."

There is variation within the scene, for example from pop/rock like early Soft Machine and much Caravan to avant-garde composed pieces as with early National Health to improvised jazz as with later Soft Machine or In Cahoots. Didier Malherbe (of Gong) has defined the scene as having "certain chord changes, in particular the use of minor second chords, certain harmonic combinations, and a great clarity in the aesthetics, and a way of improvising that is very different from what is done in jazz."

There is debate about the existence and definition of the scene. Dave Stewart has complained at the nomenclature as he and many other musicians identified with the Canterbury scene never had anything to do with Canterbury, the place. The former Soft Machine bassist Hugh Hopper, who lived in Whitstable, near Canterbury, said: "I think it's a rather artificial label, a journalistic thing... I don't mind it, but people like Robert [Wyatt], he in fact hates that idea, because he was born somewhere else and just happened to go to school here. In the time when the Wilde Flowers started we hardly ever worked in Canterbury. It wasn't until Robert and Daevid [Allen] went to London to start Soft Machine that anything happened at all. They weren't really a Canterbury band [...] if it helps people understand or listen to more music then it is fine."

In the 21st century, the Canterbury group Syd Arthur have been seen as latter-day practitioners.

== Others ==
Poet, painter, and singer Lady June was regarded an "honorary member" of the Canterbury scene for having performed and recorded with some of the members, and being a "landlady" to many in her flat in Maida Vale, London.
