= List of Whitesnake members =

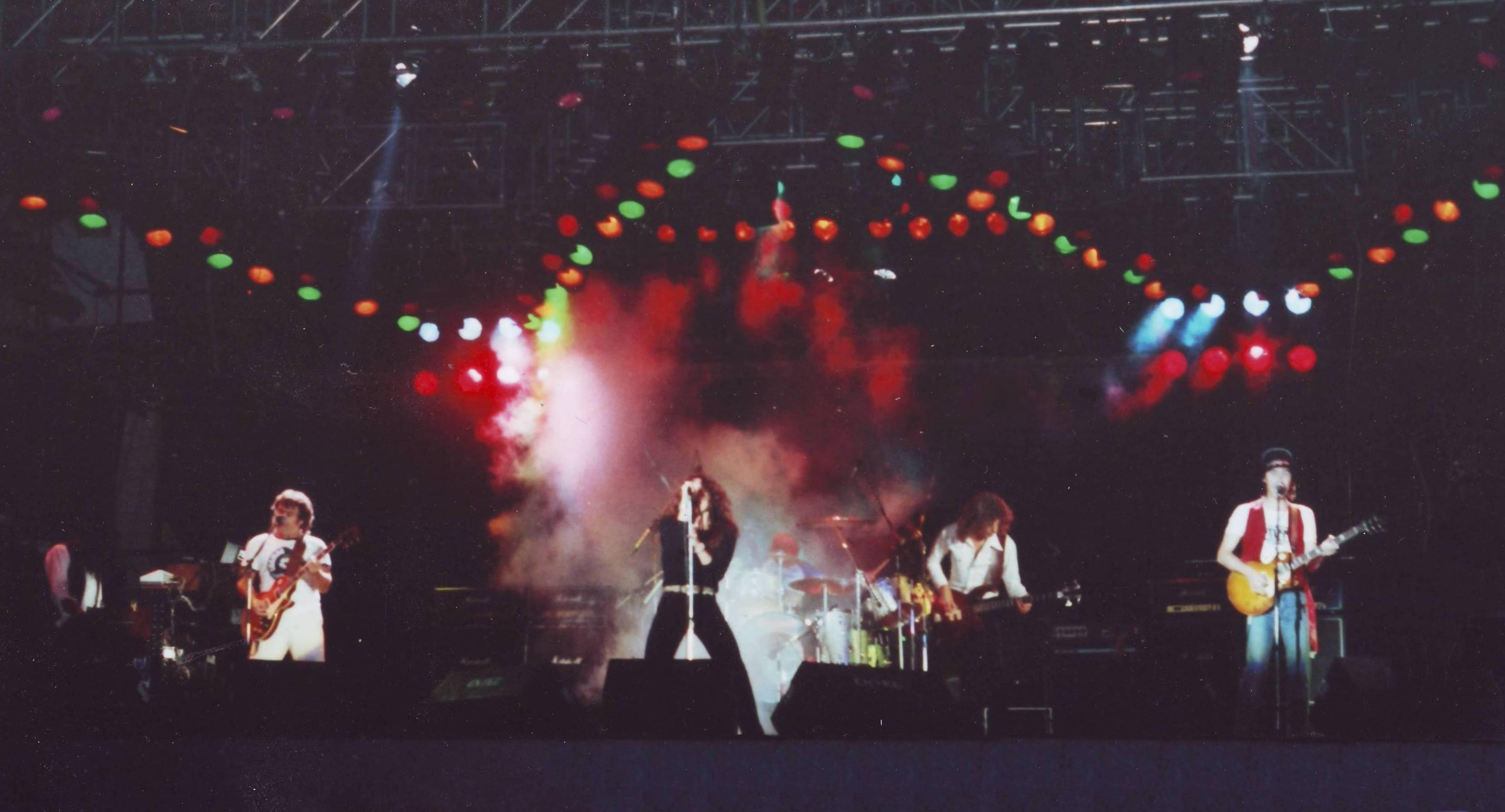
(from left to right) Jon Lord, Bernie Marsden, David Coverdale, Ian Paice (on drums), Neil Murray and Micky Moody

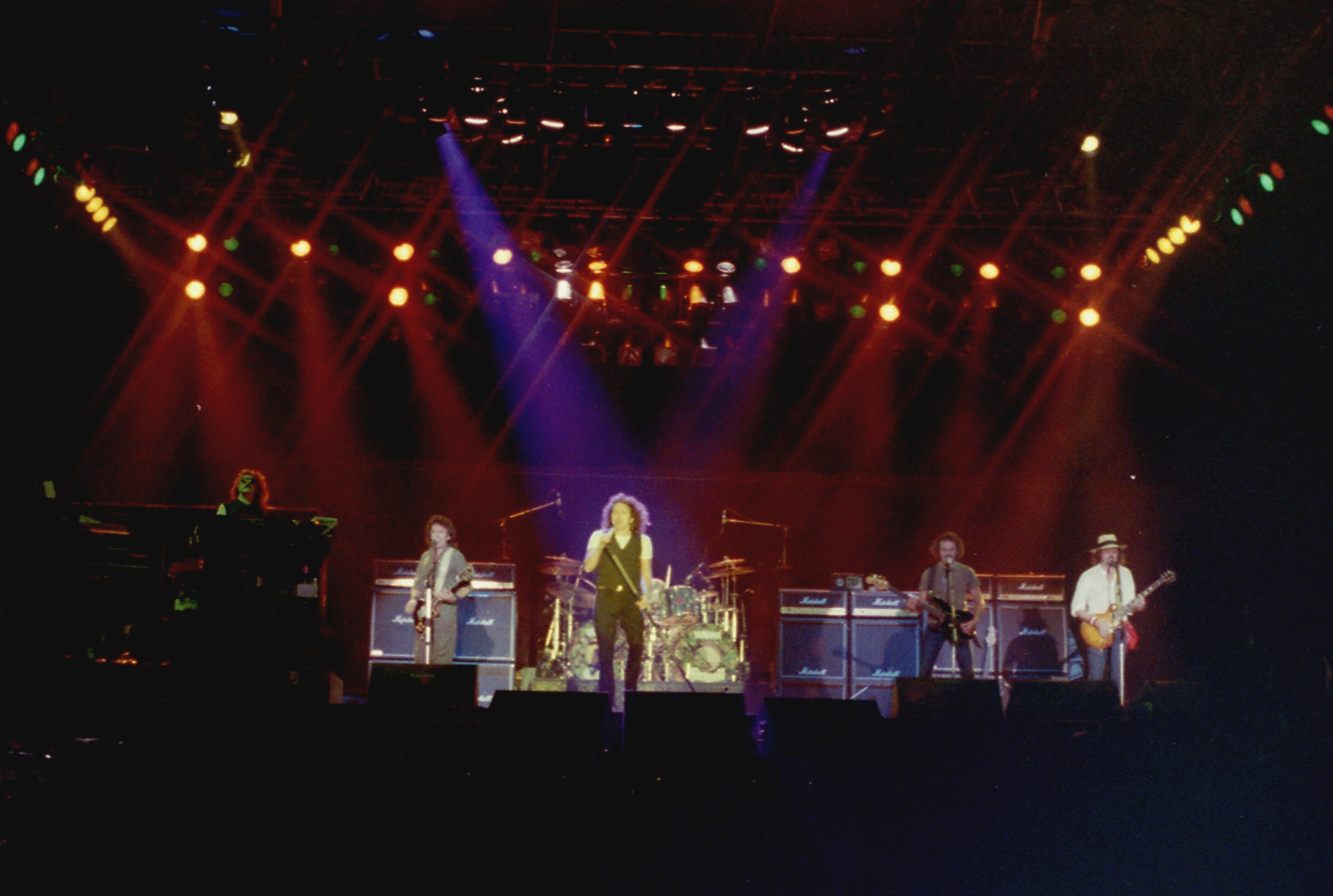
(from left to right) Jon Lord, Mel Galley, David Coverdale, Cozy Powell (on drums), Colin Hodgkinson and Micky Moody

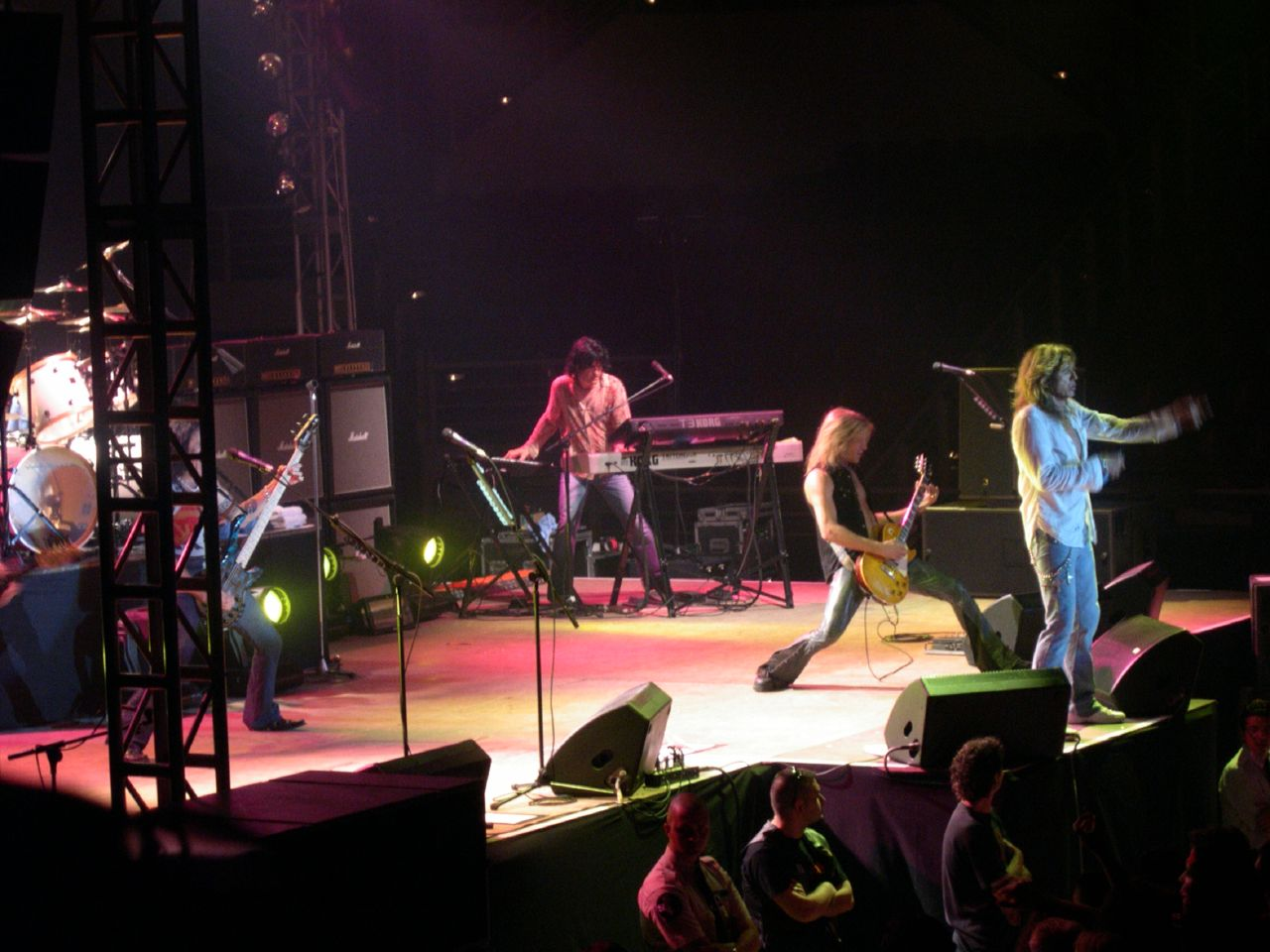
(from left to right) Tommy Aldridge (on drums off picture), Marco Mendoza, Timothy Drury, Doug Aldrich and David Coverdale (Reb Beach not shown)

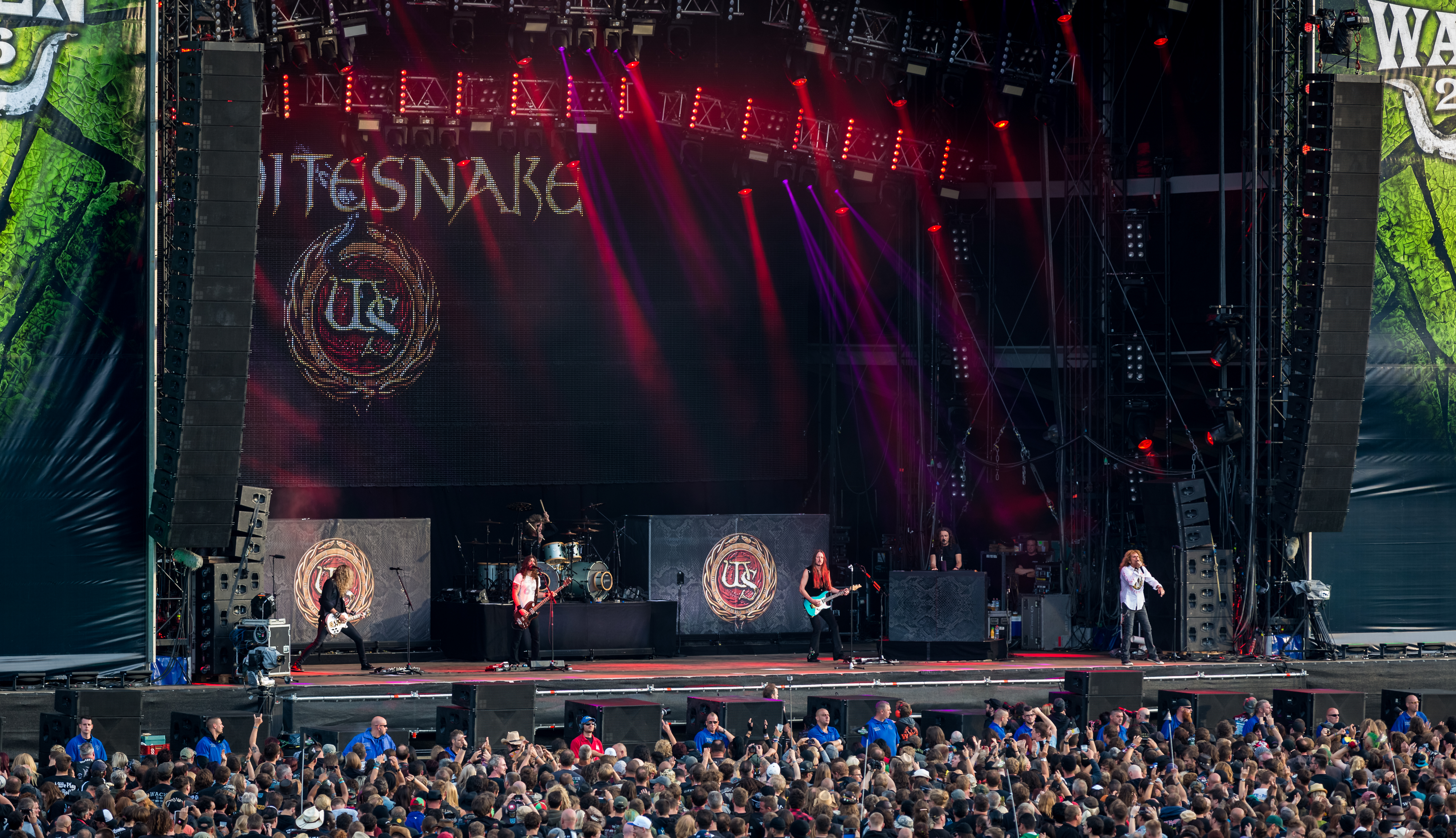
(from left to right) Joel Hoekstra, Michael Devin, Tommy Aldridge, Reb Beach, Michele Luppi and David Coverdale

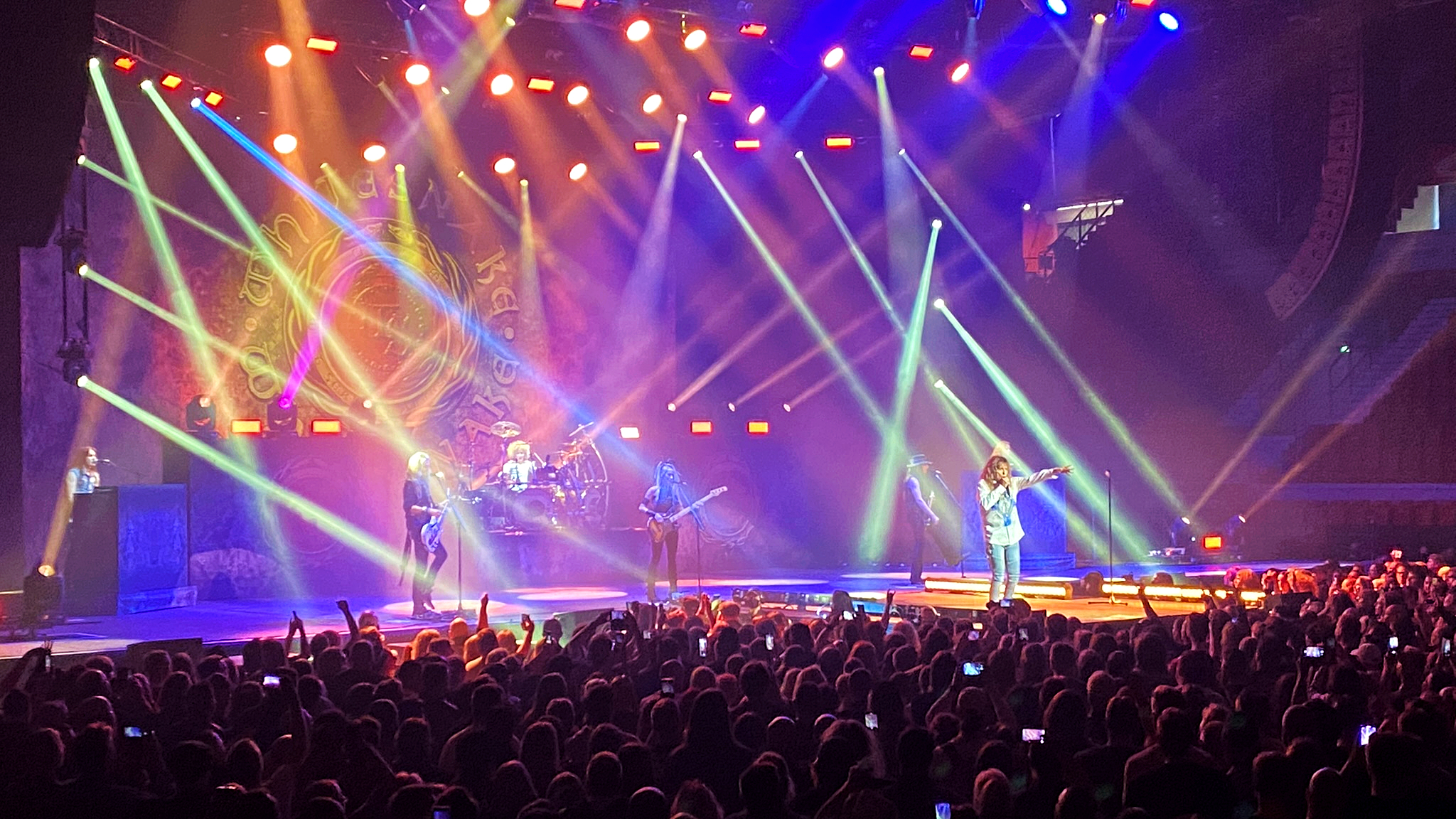
Dino Jelusick, Reb Beach, Tommy Aldridge, Tanya O'Callaghan, Michele Luppi and David Coverdale

Whitesnake performing in 1980 (first), 1983 (second), 2003 (third), 2016 (fourth), and 2022 (fifth)

Whitesnake were a British hard rock band originally from London. Formed in 1978, the group originally consisted of vocalist David Coverdale, guitarists Micky Moody and Bernie Marsden, bassist Neil Murray, drummer Dave Dowle and keyboardist Brian Johnston. The final lineup of the band included Coverdale, drummer Tommy Aldridge (from 1987 to 1990, 2003 to 2007, and since 2013), guitarists Reb Beach and Joel Hoekstra (since 2003 and 2014, respectively), keyboardists Michele Luppi and Dino Jelusick (since 2015 and 2021, respectively) and bassist Tanya O'Callaghan (also since 2021).

== History ==
=== 1978–1986 ===
Following the release and promotion of his debut solo album White Snake in 1977, vocalist David Coverdale formed the band of the same name the following February, with the original lineup including guitarists Micky Moody and Bernie Marsden, bassist Neil Murray, drummer Dave "Duck" Dowle and touring keyboardist Brian Johnston. After their first few shows, the group replaced Johnston with Peter Solley (although he was still credited as a "special guest", rather than a full member) and recorded their debut EP Snakebite. By August, Solley had also been replaced by Jon Lord, Coverdale's former bandmate in Deep Purple, in time for the recording of their debut album Trouble. Dowle was replaced in July 1979 after the recording of Lovehunter by Ian Paice, another Deep Purple alumnus. After Ready an' Willing and Come an' Get It, Whitesnake were placed on hiatus by Coverdale in early 1982, during which time Marsden, Murray and Paice all left the band for other projects.

Coverdale reformed the group in October 1982, with Moody and Lord joined by new members guitarist Mel Galley, bassist Colin Hodgkinson and drummer Cozy Powell. After the recording of Slide It In, Moody and Hodgkinson left in December 1983, with John Sykes and the returning Neil Murray taking their places. Both new members featured on the US reissue of the album, which featured re-recorded tracks. A few dates into the subsequent tour, Galley broke his arm and was forced to leave the band, who completed the shows as a five-piece. Lord also left in April, to rejoin his former bandmates in reforming Deep Purple. Whitesnake subsequently continued performing as a four-piece, adding Richard Bailey as a touring keyboardist throughout the rest of the year. After two Rock in Rio performances in January 1985, Powell also left to form Emerson, Lake & Powell. A few months later, the band started recording their self-titled album with new drummer Aynsley Dunbar and session keyboardist Don Airey.

=== 1987–1997 ===
After it was completed the previous year, Whitesnake was released in 1987. Shortly before its release, Coverdale put together an all-new lineup which included former Dio guitarist Vivian Campbell, former Vandenberg guitarist Adrian Vandenberg, and former Ozzy Osbourne bassist and drummer Rudy Sarzo and Tommy Aldridge. After the end of the album's touring cycle, Campbell left the band. He was replaced the next April by Steve Vai, formerly of David Lee Roth's solo band. Vai performed all guitars on the group's next album Slip of the Tongue, after Vandenberg suffered a wrist injury that prevented him from playing. For the album's touring cycle, Rick Seratte joined on live keyboards and vocals. At the end of the tour in late September 1990, Coverdale chose to disband Whitesnake.

In 1994, Coverdale reunited Whitesnake following the breakup of Coverdale–Page, touring between June and October 1994, in promotion of the Greatest Hits album. The band's lineup included returning members Vandenberg and Sarzo, in addition to Ratt guitarist Warren DeMartini, former Coverdale–Page drummer Denny Carmassi, and keyboardist Paul Mirkovich. At the end of the tour, the band's deal with Geffen Records expired and they disbanded again. A second reunion followed in 1997, when Coverdale, Vandenberg and Carmassi reunited alongside former Coverdale–Page touring members Guy Pratt (bass) and Brett Tuggle (keyboards) for Restless Heart. The album was initially intended to be released as Coverdale's solo album, however due to pressure from his new label EMI Records, it was released as a Whitesnake album. The tour, which ran from September to December 1997, featured Vandenberg and Carmassi, plus guitarist Steve Farris, bassist Tony Franklin and keyboardist Derek Hilland.

=== 2003-2025 ===
After a five-year hiatus, it was announced in January 2003 that Whitesnake would reform for a tour the same year, with drummer Tommy Aldridge returning, alongside new members Doug Aldrich and Reb Beach on guitars, Marco Mendoza on bass, and Timothy Drury on keyboards. In April 2005, Mendoza left to pursue "other musical avenues", with Uriah Duffy taking his place the following month. In December 2007, it was also announced that Aldridge had departed, with Chris Frazier having replaced him, to record drums for Good to Be Bad, Whitesnake's first studio album since 1997. Both Frazier and Duffy had left by June 2010, with Brian Tichy and Michael Devin taking their places, respectively. Drury left to pursue a solo career in September, with his place taken on the Forevermore touring cycle by Brian Ruedy. After two years of touring, Tichy left in January 2013 and was replaced by Aldridge a few weeks later. Aldrich later left in May 2014, citing a desire to start a solo career.

Aldrich's place in the band was taken by Night Ranger guitarist Joel Hoekstra in August 2014. The following year saw the release of The Purple Album, a collection of recordings of tracks from Coverdale's time in Deep Purple. Shortly after the album's release, Michele Luppi was enlisted as Whitesnake's new keyboardist. Flesh & Blood followed in 2019. In July 2021, Whitesnake recruited Dino Jelusick for their 2022 farewell tour, turning Whitesnake into a septet for the first time. Later that November, Michael Devin parted ways with the band. He was replaced by Tanya O'Callaghan. In 2025, Coverdale announced his retirement, effectively disbanding Whitesnake.

== Members ==
=== Final lineup ===
Image	Name	Years active	Instruments	Release contributions
	David Coverdale	1978–1990; 1994; 1997; 2003–2022	lead and backing vocals	all Whitesnake releases
	Reb Beach	2003–2022	guitar; backing vocals	Live... in the Still of the Night (2006); Live: In the Shadow of the Blues (2006); Good to Be Bad (2008); Forevermore (2011); Made in Japan (2013); Made in Britain/The World Record (2013); all Whitesnake releases from The Purple Album (2015) onwards
	Joel Hoekstra	2014–2022	guitar; backing vocals	all Whitesnake releases from The Purple Album (2015) The Purple Tour (2018) Flesh & Blood (2019) Restless Heart (2021 Remix) (1997)
	Tommy Aldridge	1987–1990; 2003–2007; 2013–2022	drums	Slip of the Tongue (1989); Live... in the Still of the Night (2006); Live: In the Shadow of the Blues (2006); Live at Donington 1990 (2011); The Purple Tour (2018); Flesh & Blood (2019)
	Michele Luppi	2015–2022	keyboards; piano; backing vocals	The Purple Tour (2018); Flesh & Blood (2019)
	Dino Jelusick	2021–2022	keyboards; guitar; backing vocals	none
	Tanya O' Callaghan	2021–2022	bass; backing vocals	none

=== Former members ===
Image	Name	Years active	Instruments	Release contributions
	Bernie Marsden	1978–1982 (died 2023)	guitar; backing and occasional lead vocals	all Whitesnake releases from Snakebite (1978) to Saints & Sinners (1982)
	Neil Murray	1978–1982; 1983–1987	bass; occasional backing vocals	all Whitesnake releases from Snakebite (1978) to Whitesnake (1987) except Whitesnake Commandos (1983) and Slide It In US version (1984); Live in '84: Back to the Bone (2014)
	Jon Lord	1978–1984 (died 2012)	keyboards	all Whitesnake releases from Trouble (1978) to Slide It In (1984); Live in '84: Back to the Bone (2014)
	Micky Moody	1978–1981; 1982–1983	guitar; backing vocals	all Whitesnake releases from Snakebite (1978) to Slide It In (1984)
	Dave "Duck" Dowle	1978–1979	drums	all Whitesnake releases from Snakebite (1978) to Live at Hammersmith (1980)
	Ian Paice	1979–1982	drums	all Whitesnake releases from Ready an' Willing (1980) to Saints & Sinners (1982)
	Cozy Powell	1982–1985 (died 1998)	drums	Whitesnake Commandos (1983); Slide It In (1984); Live in '84: Back to the Bone (2014)
	Mel Galley	1982–1984 (died 2008)	guitar; backing vocals	Saints & Sinners (1982); Whitesnake Commandos (1983); Slide It In (1984); Live in '84: Back to the Bone (2014)
	Colin Hodgkinson	1982–1983	bass; backing vocals	Whitesnake Commandos (1983); Slide It In UK version (1984)
	John Sykes	1983–1986 (died 2024)	guitar; backing vocals	Slide It In (US reissue) (1984); Whitesnake (1987); Live in '84: Back to the Bone (2014)
	Aynsley Dunbar	1985–1986	drums	Whitesnake (1987)
	Adrian Vandenberg	1987–1990; 1994; 1997	guitar; backing vocals	Whitesnake (1987); Slip of the Tongue (1989); Restless Heart (1997); Starkers in Tokyo (1997); Live at Donington 1990 (2011); Unzipped (2018)
	Vivian Campbell	1987–1988	guitar; backing vocals	"Give Me All Your Love" (single version) (1988)
	Rudy Sarzo	1987–1990; 1994	bass; backing vocals	Slip of the Tongue (1989); Live at Donington 1990 (2011)
	Steve Vai	1989–1990	guitar; backing vocals	Slip of the Tongue (1989); Live at Donington 1990 (2011)
	Denny Carmassi	1994; 1997	drums; percussion	session credit on "Here I Go Again" (single version) (1987); Restless Heart (1997); Unzipped (2018)
	Warren DeMartini	1994	guitar; backing vocals	none
	Paul Mirkovich	1994	keyboards; backing vocals	none
	Brett Tuggle	1997 (died 2022)	keyboards; backing vocals	Restless Heart (1997)
	Guy Pratt	1997	bass	
	Steve Farris	1997	guitar; backing vocals	none
	Tony Franklin	1997	bass; backing vocals	none
	Derek Hilland	1997	keyboards	The Purple Album (2015)
	Doug Aldrich	2003–2014	guitar; backing vocals	Live... in the Still of the Night (2006); Live: In the Shadow of the Blues (2006); Good to Be Bad (2008); Forevermore (2011); Made in Japan (2013); Made in Britain/The World Record (2013); Unzipped (2018)
	Timothy Drury	2003–2010	keyboards; backing vocals	Live... in the Still of the Night (2006); Live: In the Shadow of the Blues (2006); Good to Be Bad (2008); session credit on Forevermore (2011); Unzipped (2018)
	Marco Mendoza	2003–2005	bass; backing vocals	Live... in the Still of the Night (2006); Unzipped (2018)
	Uriah Duffy	2005–2010	bass; backing vocals	Live: In the Shadow of the Blues (2006); Good to Be Bad (2008); Unzipped (2018)
	Chris Frazier	2007–2010	drums	Good to Be Bad (2008); Unzipped (2018)
	Brian Tichy	2010–2013	drums; backing vocals	Forevermore (2011); Made in Japan (2013); Made in Britain/The World Record (2013); Unzipped (2018)
	Michael Devin	2010–2021	bass; harmonica; backing vocals	Forevermore (2011); Made in Japan (2013); Made in Britain/The World Record (2013); The Purple Album (2015); The Purple Tour (2018); Flesh & Blood (2019)

=== Session/touring musicians ===
Image	Name	Years active	Instruments	Details
	Brian Johnston	1978	keyboards	Johnston was the keyboardist for Whitesnake's first few shows, but was not credited as a full band member.
	Peter Solley	1978 (died 2023)	keyboards	Solley replaced Johnston and performed on Snakebite, but was still credited as a "special guest" performer.
	Richard Bailey	1984–1985	keyboards	Following the departure of Jon Lord in April 1984, Whitesnake enlisted Richard Bailey to take his place on tour.
	Rick Seratte	1989–1990	keyboards	In the absence of a full-time keyboardist, Seratte performed on the tour promoting 1989's Slip of the Tongue.
	Brian Ruedy	2011–2013	keyboards; backing vocals	Following the departure of Timothy Drury in September 2010, Ruedy performed on the Forevermore tour.

=== Session musicians ===
Image	Name	Years active	Instruments	Release contributions
	Bill Cuomo	1983; 1985–1986	keyboards	Slide It In (1984); Whitesnake (1987)
	Don Airey	1985–1986; 1988–1989	keyboards	Whitesnake (1987); Slip of the Tongue (1989)
	Tommy Funderburk	1985–1986; 1988–1989; 1997	backing vocals	Whitesnake (1987); Slip of the Tongue (1989); Restless Heart (1997)
	Dann Huff	1985–1986	guitar	"Here I Go Again" (single version) (1987)
	Mark Andes	1985–1986	bass	"Here I Go Again" (single version) (1987)
	Claude Gaudette	1988–1989	keyboards	Slip of the Tongue (1989)
	Glenn Hughes	1988–1989	backing vocals	Slip of the Tongue (1989)
	Richard Page	1988–1989	backing vocals	Slip of the Tongue (1989)
	Beth Anderson	1997	backing vocals	Restless Heart (1997)
	Maxine Waters	1997	backing vocals	Restless Heart (1997)
	Elk Thunder	1997	harmonica	Restless Heart (1997)
	Chris Whitemyer	1997	percussion	Restless Heart (1997)
	Jasper Coverdale	2010	backing vocals	Forevermore (2011)
	Derek Sherinian	2020	keyboards	Sherinian performed on remixed versions of Slip of the Tongue and Restless Heart.
	Christopher Collier	2021	percussion; backing vocals	Restless Heart (1997) (2021 remix)

== Lineups ==
Period	Members	Releases
February – March 1978	David Coverdale – lead vocals; Micky Moody – guitar, backing vocals; Bernie Marsden – guitar, backing and lead vocals; Neil Murray – bass; Dave "Duck" Dowle – drums; Brian Johnston – keyboards (touring)	none – live performances only
April – July 1978	David Coverdale – lead vocals; Micky Moody – guitar, backing vocals; Bernie Marsden – guitar, backing and lead vocals; Neil Murray – bass; Dave "Duck" Dowle – drums; Peter Solley – keyboards (session/touring)	Snakebite (1978)
August 1978 – July 1979	David Coverdale – lead vocals; Micky Moody – guitar, backing vocals; Bernie Marsden – guitar, backing and lead vocals; Neil Murray – bass; Dave "Duck" Dowle – drums; Jon Lord – keyboards	Trouble (1978); Lovehunter (1979); Live... in the Heart of the City (1980)
July 1979 – January 1982	David Coverdale – lead vocals; Micky Moody – guitar, backing vocals; Bernie Marsden – guitar, backing and lead vocals; Neil Murray – bass; Jon Lord – keyboards; Ian Paice – drums	Ready an' Willing (1980); Live... in the Heart of the City (1980); Come an' Get It (1981); Saints & Sinners (1982)
October 1982 – December 1983	David Coverdale – lead vocals; Micky Moody – guitar, backing vocals; Jon Lord – keyboards; Cozy Powell – drums; Mel Galley – guitar, backing vocals; Colin Hodgkinson – bass, backing vocals	Slide It In (1984)
December 1983 – March 1984	David Coverdale – lead vocals; Jon Lord – keyboards; Cozy Powell – drums; Mel Galley – guitar, backing vocals; John Sykes – guitar, backing vocals; Neil Murray – bass	Slide It In (US edition) (1984)
March – April 1984	David Coverdale – lead vocals; Jon Lord – keyboards; Cozy Powell – drums; John Sykes – guitar, backing vocals; Neil Murray – bass, backing vocals	Live in '84: Back to the Bone (2014)
April 1984 – January 1985	David Coverdale – lead vocals; Cozy Powell – drums; John Sykes – guitar, backing vocals; Neil Murray – bass, backing vocals; Richard Bailey – keyboards (touring)	Live in '84: Back to the Bone (2014)
August 1985 – April 1986	David Coverdale – lead vocals; John Sykes – guitar, backing vocals; Neil Murray – bass; Aynsley Dunbar – drums	Whitesnake (1987); 1987 Versions (1987)
April 1987 – December 1988	David Coverdale – lead vocals; Adrian Vandenberg – guitar, backing vocals; Vivian Campbell – guitar, backing vocals; Rudy Sarzo – bass, backing vocals; Tommy Aldridge – drums	none – live performances only
April 1989 – September 1990	David Coverdale – lead vocals; Adrian Vandenberg – guitar, backing vocals; Rudy Sarzo – bass, backing vocals; Tommy Aldridge – drums; Steve Vai – guitar, backing vocals; Rick Seratte – keyboards (touring)	Slip of the Tongue (1989); Live at Donington 1990 (2011)
Band inactive September 1990 – June 1994
June – October 1994	David Coverdale – lead vocals; Adrian Vandenberg – guitar, backing vocals; Rudy Sarzo – bass; Denny Carmassi – drums; Warren DeMartini – guitar, backing vocals; Paul Mirkovich – keyboards, backing vocals	none – live performances only
Band inactive October 1994 – March 1997
March – September 1997	David Coverdale – lead vocals; Adrian Vandenberg – guitar, backing vocals; Denny Carmassi – drums; Guy Pratt – bass; Brett Tuggle – keyboards, backing vocals	Restless Heart (1997); Starkers in Tokyo (1997) (Coverdale and Vandenberg only)
September – December 1997	David Coverdale – lead vocals; Adrian Vandenberg – guitar, backing vocals; Denny Carmassi – drums; Steve Farris – guitar, backing vocals; Tony Franklin – bass, backing vocals; Derek Hilland – keyboards	none – live performances only
Band inactive December 1997 – December 2002
December 2002 – April 2005	David Coverdale – lead vocals; Doug Aldrich – guitar, backing vocals; Reb Beach – guitar, backing vocals; Timothy Drury – keyboards, backing vocals; Marco Mendoza – bass, backing vocals; Tommy Aldridge – drums	Live... in the Still of the Night (2006)
May 2005 – December 2007	David Coverdale – lead vocals; Doug Aldrich – guitar, backing vocals; Reb Beach – guitar, backing vocals; Timothy Drury – keyboards, backing vocals; Tommy Aldridge – drums; Uriah Duffy – bass, backing vocals	Live: In the Shadow of the Blues (2006)
December 2007 – June 2010	David Coverdale – lead vocals; Doug Aldrich – guitar, backing vocals; Reb Beach – guitar, backing vocals; Timothy Drury – keyboards, backing vocals; Uriah Duffy – bass, backing vocals; Chris Frazier – drums	Good to Be Bad (2008); Unzipped: Starkers in New York (2018)
August – September 2010	David Coverdale – lead vocals; Doug Aldrich – guitar, backing vocals; Reb Beach – guitar, backing vocals; Timothy Drury – keyboards, backing vocals; Michael Devin – bass, harmonica, backing vocals; Brian Tichy – drums, backing vocals	Forevermore (2011)
March 2011 – January 2013	David Coverdale – lead vocals; Doug Aldrich – guitar, backing vocals; Reb Beach – guitar, backing vocals; Michael Devin – bass, harmonica, backing vocals; Brian Tichy – drums, backing vocals; Brian Ruedy – keyboards, backing vocals (touring/session)	Made in Japan (2013); Made in Britain/The World Record (2013)
January 2013 – May 2014	David Coverdale – lead vocals; Doug Aldrich – guitar, backing vocals; Reb Beach – guitar, backing vocals; Michael Devin – bass, harmonica, backing vocals; Tommy Aldridge – drums; Brian Ruedy – keyboards, backing vocals (touring)	none – live performances only
August 2014 – April 2015	David Coverdale – lead vocals; Reb Beach – guitar, backing vocals; Michael Devin – bass, harmonica, backing vocals; Tommy Aldridge – drums; Joel Hoekstra – guitar, backing vocals	The Purple Album (2015)
April 2015 – July 2021	David Coverdale – lead vocals; Reb Beach – guitar, backing vocals; Michael Devin – bass, harmonica, backing vocals; Tommy Aldridge – drums; Joel Hoekstra – guitar, backing vocals; Michele Luppi – keyboards, backing vocals	The Purple Tour (2018); Flesh & Blood (2019)
July – November 2021	David Coverdale – lead vocals; Reb Beach – guitar, backing vocals; Michael Devin – bass, harmonica, backing vocals; Tommy Aldridge – drums; Joel Hoekstra – guitar, backing vocals; Michele Luppi – keyboards, backing vocals; Dino Jelusick – keyboards, backing vocals	none
November 2021 – June 2022	David Coverdale – lead vocals; Reb Beach – guitar, backing vocals; Tommy Aldridge – drums; Joel Hoekstra – guitar, backing vocals; Michele Luppi – keyboards, backing vocals; Dino Jelusick – keyboards, guitar, backing vocals; Tanya O'Callaghan – bass, backing vocals	none
