= List of band members in David Coverdale's bands =

David Coverdale is best known for his band Whitesnake. Whitesnake emerged when Coverdale wanted to name his backing band on tour, before becoming a device for him to promote himself with though it remained his backing band and not a band in its own right. Later Coverdale would return to solo work and would also work with Jimmy Page on one album. Aside from Coverdale himself, there was a number of other overlaps in membership of these various groups. To construct an accurate chronology of his backing band therefore, the lineups for Coverdale's backing band, Whitesnake and Coverdale–Page have been included.

== Deep Purple (1973–1976) ==
The first lineup of Deep Purple with David Coverdale and Glenn Hughes, released two studio albums – Burn and Stormbringer, both in 1974 – before founding member Ritchie Blackmore left the band, mainly due to the new influences of funk rock, presented by Coverdale and Hughes. The Mark IV lineup of the band, featuring Tommy Bolin in place of Blackmore, released their only album Come Taste the Band in 1975, before the band broke up, the following year.

Lineup	Years	Members	Studio albums
Mark III	1973–1975	David Coverdale – lead vocals; Ritchie Blackmore – guitar; Glenn Hughes – bass, vocals; Jon Lord – keyboards; Ian Paice – drums, percussion	Burn (1974); Stormbringer (1974)
Mark IV	1975–1976	David Coverdale – lead vocals; Tommy Bolin – guitar, vocals; Glenn Hughes – bass, vocals; Jon Lord – keyboards; Ian Paice – drums, percussion	Come Taste the Band (1975)

== David Coverdale backing bands - transformed into Whitesnake (1976–1978) ==
Whitesnake wasn't so much formed, as evolved. The band was put together, during the process of Coverdale's post-Deep Purple solo career. He began to work with one of the original Whitesnake guitarists Micky Moody, on both of his solo albums. The touring band in 1978, that Coverdale used (to support his Northwinds album) was the band that would become Whitesnake, very shortly.

Period	Lineup	Releases
David Coverdale Band (1976–1977)	David Coverdale - vocals; Micky Moody - guitar; Roger Glover - bass; Tim Hinkley - keyboards; with: DeLisle Harper - bass; Simon Phillips - drums; Ron Aspery - saxophone	White Snake (1977)
David Coverdale Band (1977)	David Coverdale - vocals; Micky Moody - guitar; Alan Spenner - bass; Tim Hinkley - keyboards; Tony Newman - drums	Northwinds (1978)
David Coverdale Band/Whitesnake (1978)	David Coverdale - lead vocals; Micky Moody - guitar, backing vocals; Bernie Marsden - guitar, backing vocals; Neil Murray - bass; Brian Johnston - keyboards; Dave Dowle - drums	

== First Whitesnake era (1978–1990) ==
When reforming Whitesnake in October 1982 after a brief hiatus, Coverdale only brought back Moody and Lord, and the band was hurriedly put together, while it changed as it settled. The session musicians required to complete Whitesnake's self-titled album in 1987, only played on the song Here I Go Again 87 (other than the keyboards), because this song was unfinished, when the other band members were fired by Coverdale.

Period	Lineup	Releases	Tours
David Coverdale's Whitesnake (1978)	David Coverdale – lead vocals; Micky Moody – guitar, backing vocals; Bernie Marsden – guitar, backing vocals; Neil Murray – bass; Dave "Duck" Dowle – drums; Brian Johnston – keyboards (touring)	Snakebite (1978)	
Whitesnake (1978–1979)	David Coverdale – lead vocals; Micky Moody – guitar, backing vocals; Bernie Marsden – guitar, backing vocals; Neil Murray – bass; Dave "Duck" Dowle – drums; Peter Solley – keyboards (session/touring)	Trouble (1978); Lovehunter (1979); Live at Hammersmith (1980)	Trouble Tour (1978–1979)
Whitesnake (1979–1982)	David Coverdale – lead vocals; Micky Moody – guitar, backing vocals; Bernie Marsden – guitar, backing vocals; Neil Murray – bass; Ian Paice – drums; Jon Lord – keyboards	Ready an' Willing (1980); Live...in the Heart of the City (1980); Come an' Get It (1981); Saints & Sinners (1982); Box 'o' Snakes: the Sunburst Years 1978–1982 Disc 8:Live At The Reading Rock Festival 1979 (2011); Box 'o' Snakes: the Sunburst Years 1978–1982 Disc 9: Live At The Reading Rock Festival 1980 (2011)	Love Hunter Tour (1979); Ready an' Willing Tour (1980); Come an' Get It Tour (1981)
Whitesnake (1982–1983)	David Coverdale – lead vocals; Micky Moody – guitar, backing vocals; Mel Galley – guitar, backing vocals; Colin Hodgkinson – bass; Cozy Powell – drums; Jon Lord – keyboards	Live At Donington 1983 (Whitesnake Commandos); Slide It In - UK version (1984)	Saints & Sinners Tour (1982–1983)
Whitesnake (1983–1984)	David Coverdale – lead vocals; John Sykes – guitar, backing vocals; Mel Galley – guitar, backing vocals; Neil Murray – bass; Cozy Powell – drums; Jon Lord –keyboards	Slide It In - US version (1984)	Slide It In Tour (1984–1985)
Whitesnake (1984)	David Coverdale – lead vocals; Mel Galley – guitar, backing vocals; John Sykes – guitar, backing vocals; Neil Murray – bass; Cozy Powell – drums; Jon Lord – keyboards		Slide It In Tour (1984–1985)
Whitesnake (1984–1985)	David Coverdale – lead vocals; John Sykes – guitar, backing vocals; Neil Murray – bass, backing vocals; Cozy Powell – drums; Jon Lord – keyboards	Live In 1984: Back To The Bone (2014)	Slide It In Tour (1984–1985)
Whitesnake (1985–1987)	David Coverdale – lead vocals; John Sykes – guitar, backing vocals; Neil Murray – bass; Aynsley Dunbar – drums; Don Airey – keyboards (touring)	Whitesnake (1987)	
Whitesnake (1988–1989)	David Coverdale – lead vocals; Vivian Campbell – guitar, backing vocals; Adrian Vandenberg – guitar, backing vocals; Rudy Sarzo – bass; Tommy Aldridge – drums	"Give Me All Your Love" '88 Mix (1988)	Whitesnake 1987–1988 World Tour (1987–1988)
Whitesnake (1989–1990)	David Coverdale – lead vocals; Adrian Vandenberg – guitar, backing vocals; Steve Vai – guitar, backing vocals; Rudy Sarzo – bass; Tommy Aldridge – drums; Rick Seratte – keyboards (touring)	Slip of the Tongue (1989); Live at Donington 1990 (2011)	Slip of the Tongue Tour (1990)

== Coverdale embarks on Coverdale•Page collaboration (1990–1993) ==
When Coverdale disbanded Whitesnake in 1990, to work with Jimmy Page, he worked with drummer Denny Carmassi (who had done a little session work in 1987, for Whitesnake), bassist Guy Pratt and keyboardist Brett Tuggle. Carmassi played on both the album and tour in support of Coverdale–Page while Pratt and Tuggle, only played on the tour.

Period	Lineup	Releases
Coverdale•Page (1990–1993)	David Coverdale - lead vocals; Jimmy Page - guitars, bass, dulcimer; Jorge Casas - bass; Ricky Phillips - bass; Lester Mendel - keyboards, percussion; Denny Carmassi - drums, percussion; Tommy Fanderburk - backing vocals; John Sambataro - backing vocals; John Harris - harmonica	Coverdale–Page (1993)
Coverdale•Page (1993) Coverdale•Page Tour	David Coverdale - lead vocals; Jimmy Page - guitars; Guy Pratt - bass, backing vocals; Brett Tuggle - keyboards, backing vocals; Denny Carmassi - drums, percussion	

== Second Whitesnake era: temporary reunions (1994–1997) ==
Carmassi would join Whitesnake for the 1994 Greatest Hits reunion tour, which was organised shortly after Coverdale put the new compilation album together. Carmassi, Pratt and Tuggle would later join Coverdale and Vanderberg in 1997, for the album Restless Heart (though this was initially meant to be released as a David Coverdale solo album, and Pratt and Tuggle left, before the supporting tour).

Period	Lineup	Releases	Tours
Whitesnake (1994)	David Coverdale - vocals; Warren DeMartini - guitar; Adrian Vandenberg – guitar; Rudy Sarzo - bass; Denny Carmassi - drums; Paul Mirkovich - keyboards		Greatest Hits Tour (1994)
David Coverdale & Whitesnake (1995–1997)	David Coverdale – lead vocals; Adrian Vandenberg – guitar; Guy Pratt – bass; Brett Tuggle – keyboards, backing vocals; Denny Carmassi - drums	Restless Heart (1997)	
Whitesnake Unplugged (5 July 1997)	David Coverdale – vocals; Adrian Vandenberg – guitar	Starkers in Tokyo (1998)	
Whitesnake (1997)	David Coverdale – vocals; Adrian Vandenberg – guitar; Steve Farris - guitar; Tony Franklin – bass; Denny Carmassi - drums; Derek Hilland – keyboards		Restless Heart Reunion Tour / Farewell Tour (1997)
Band split (1997)		Coverdale takes time off after hectic tour	

== David Coverdale returns to solo work and tours (1998–2002) ==
Hilland, Franklin, and Carmassi all joined Coverdale, for his 2000 solo album Into the Light. Earl Slick, Doug Bossi, Mike Finnigan and future Whitesnake member Marco Mendoza also contributed.

== Third era Whitesnake: 25th anniversary re-formation (2003–2025) ==
In 2003, Whitesnake fully re-formed. Unlike the reunions of the mid-1990s, this was a full-time lineup, just like the band had existed previously in the late 1970s, 1980s and early 1990s. Coverdale announced his retirement in 2025, putting the end to Whitesnake.

Period	Lineup	Releases	Tours
Whitesnake 25th Anniversary Reformation (2003–2005)	David Coverdale - lead vocals; Doug Aldrich - guitar, backing vocals; Reb Beach - guitar, backing vocals; Marco Mendoza - bass, backing vocals; Timothy Drury - keyboards, backing vocals; Tommy Aldridge - drums	Live... in the Still of the Night (2006)	VH1 Classic Presents "mmm...Nice Package Tour" (2003); Monsters of Rock (Europe) Tour (2003); Rock Never Stops (USA) Tour (2003); 25th Anniversary Greatest Hits Tour Japan 03 (2003); Live...In the Still of the Night - European Tour (2004)
Whitesnake (2005–2007)	David Coverdale - lead vocals; Doug Aldrich - guitar, backing vocals; Reb Beach - guitar, backing vocals; Uriah Duffy - bass, backing vocals; Timothy Drury - keyboards, backing vocals; Tommy Aldridge - drums	Live... in the Shadow of the Blues (2006)	The Rock & Roll, Rhythm & Blues Show Tour (2005); Live... In the Shadow of the Blues Tour (2006)
Whitesnake (2007–2010)	David Coverdale - lead vocals; Doug Aldrich - guitar, backing vocals; Reb Beach - guitar, backing vocals; Uriah Duffy - bass, backing vocals; Timothy Drury - keyboards, backing vocals; Chris Frazier - drums	Good to Be Bad (2008)	Good to Be Bad World Tour (2008–2009)
Whitesnake (2010–2011)	David Coverdale - lead vocals; Doug Aldrich - guitar, backing vocals; Reb Beach - guitar, backing vocals; Michael Devin - bass, backing vocals; Brian Tichy - drums, backing vocals; with: Timothy Drury - keyboards (session musician)	Forevermore (2011)	
Whitesnake (2011–2013)	David Coverdale - lead vocals; Doug Aldrich - guitar, backing vocals; Reb Beach - guitar, backing vocals; Michael Devin - bass, backing vocals; Brian Tichy - drums, backing vocals; Brian Ruedy - keyboards, backing vocals	Made In Japan (2013); Made In Britain/The World Record (2013)	Forevermore World Tour (2011)
Whitesnake (2013–2014)	David Coverdale - lead vocals; Doug Aldrich - guitar, backing vocals; Reb Beach - guitar, backing vocals; Michael Devin - bass, backing vocals; Tommy Aldridge - drums; Brian Ruedy - keyboards, backing vocals		UK Tour with Journey (2013); Year Of The Snake Tour (2013); Globar Warming Tour with Aerosmith (2013)
Whitesnake (2014–2015)	David Coverdale - lead vocals; Joel Hoekstra - guitar, backing vocals; Reb Beach - guitar, backing vocals; Michael Devin - bass, backing vocals; Tommy Aldridge - drums; with: Derek Hilland - keyboards (session musician)	The Purple Album (2015)	
Whitesnake (2015–2021)	David Coverdale - lead vocals; Joel Hoekstra - guitar, backing vocals; Reb Beach - guitar, backing vocals; Michael Devin - bass, backing vocals; Tommy Aldridge - drums; Michele Luppi – keyboards, backing vocals	Flesh & Blood (2019)	The Purple Tour (2015); The Greatest Hits Tour (2016); The Purple Tour (2018)
Whitesnake (2021–2025)	David Coverdale – lead vocals; Reb Beach – guitar, backing vocals; Joel Hoekstra – guitar, backing vocals; Tanya O'Callaghan – bass, backing vocals; Tommy Aldridge – drums; Michele Luppi – keyboards, backing vocals; Dino Jelusick – keyboards, guitar, backing vocals		
