= Long Way from Home (EP) =

EP by Whitesnake
- Released: 26 October 1979
- Recorded: 1979
- Genre: Hard rock, blues rock
- Length: 16:27
- Label: United Artists
- Producer: Martin Birch

Whitesnake chronology
The Time Is Right for Love (1979)	Long Way from Home (1979)	Fool for Your Loving (1980)

Music video
- "Long Way from Home" on YouTube

Long Way from Home is a 1979 EP by British hard rock band Whitesnake. The titular song was written by lead singer David Coverdale, and "Trouble" and "Ain't No Love in the Heart of the City" are the B-side tracks. The song was taken from the band's album Lovehunter, and was the lead-off track. The song charted at number 55 on the UK Singles Chart in 1979.

The Japanese release was the single, and its B-side was "Walking in the Shadow of the Blues".

== Lyrics ==
The song uses the lyric "long, long way from home" in its chorus, but the song itself only has one "Long" in the title. This was likely done to avoid confusion with Foreigner's similarly titled 1977 hit, Long, Long Way from Home.

== Track listing ==
UK EP

1. "Long Way from Home" - 4:56
2. "Trouble" – 5:00 (live at Hammersmith 1978)
3. "Ain't No Love in the Heart of the City" – 6:36 (live at Hammersmith 1978)

Japanese release

1. "Long Way from Home" - 4:56
2. "Walking in the Shadow of the Blues" - 4:24

== Personnel ==
- David Coverdale – lead vocals
- Micky Moody – guitars, backing vocals
- Bernie Marsden – guitars, lead vocals
- Neil Murray – bass
- Dave Dowle – drums
- Jon Lord – keyboards
- Martin Birch - producer

== Charts ==
Year	Title	Chart	Position
1979	"Long Way from Home"	UK Singles Chart	55
