= Lazarus (Japanese TV series) =

Japanese anime television series

- Key visual for the series, featuring the Lazarus team
- Genre: Action; Science fiction
- Created by: Shinichirō Watanabe
- Written by: Shinichirō Watanabe; Dai Satō; Takahiro Ozawa; Tsukasa Kondō
- Directed by: Shinichirō Watanabe
- Voices of: Mamoru Miyano; Makoto Furukawa; Maaya Uchida; Yuma Uchida; Manaka Iwami; Megumi Hayashibara; Akio Otsuka; Koichi Yamadera
- Music by: Kamasi Washington; Bonobo; Floating Points
- Opening theme: "Vortex" by Kamasi Washington
- Ending theme: "Lazarus" by the Boo Radleys
- Countries of origin: Japan; United States
- Original language: Japanese (Note: Sentai Studios was commissioned to produce the English dub and sub.)
- No. of seasons: 1
- No. of episodes: 13

Production
- Executive producer: Jason DeMarco
- Producer: Joseph Chou
- Cinematography: Mitsuhiro Sato
- Animator: MAPPA
- Editor: Kumiko Sakamoto
- Running time: 24 minutes
- Production companies: Sola Entertainment; Williams Street (Note: Executive production)

Original release
- Network: TV Tokyo (JP); Adult Swim (US)
- Release: April 6 – June 29, 2025

Lazarus (Japanese: LAZARUS ラザロ, Hepburn: Razaro) is an anime television series produced by MAPPA and Sola Entertainment for Cartoon Network's nighttime programming block Adult Swim. It was created and directed by Shinichirō Watanabe. The series aired near-simultaneously in Japan on TV Tokyo and its affiliates and in the United States on Adult Swim's Toonami programming block (along with an Adult Swim Canada simulcast) from April to June 2025.

== Plot ==
In the utopian year 2049, the world-renowned neuroscientist Dr. Skinner has discovered a miracle analgesic drug known as "Hapna" that completely relieves the user of any pain, shortly before disappearing off the face of the Earth. Three years later in October 2052, Skinner resurfaces to the public in an online video to announce the drug has a three-year half-life and that soon, everyone who took it will die.

A task force of five agents, called "Lazarus", is assembled to locate Skinner within 30 days and get him to divulge a vaccine before the first wave of Hapna users die.

== Characters ==
The Lazarus team from left to right: Eleina, Christine "Chris" Blake, Axel Gilberto, Douglas "Doug" Hadine, and Leland Astor

=== Lazarus ===
==== Members ====
Axel Gilberto (アクセル・ギルベルト, Akuseru Giruberuto)
Voiced by: Mamoru Miyano (Japanese); Jack Stansbury (English)
A 23-year-old Brazilian man who was originally in jail for three years on a minor charge, but has since racked up several life sentences totaling 888 years due to his habit of finding ways to break out of whatever prison he is sent to. Incredibly agile and seemingly fearless, he can use his wits and his physical parkour abilities to escape almost any situation. He is a straightforward and friendly person, but he also exudes a somewhat solitary persona.
Douglas "Doug" Hadine (ダグラス・"ダグ"・ハディン, Dagurasu "Dagu" Hadin)
Voiced by: Makoto Furukawa (Japanese); Jovan Jackson (English)
A 23-year-old Nigerian man who is intellectual and the coordinator of the Lazarus team. He has great physical abilities and stays calm and collected under pressure. He is sensitive and delicate, paying attention to the small details. He also has a high level of pride. In college, he majored in physics as a student and once looked up to Dr. Skinner as a role model before the Hapna revelation. During his collaboration within Lazarus, he develops a friendly, playful relationship with Axel, even jokingly rejecting him during one of the dialogues.
Christine "Chris" Blake (クリスティン・"クリス"・ブレイク, Kurisutin "Kurisu" Bureiku)
Voiced by: Maaya Uchida (Japanese); Luci Christian (English)
A young Russian woman who is generally cheerful and frank, talking to anyone in a friendly manner. She is a gun specialist skilled in many kinds of firearms. Chris drinks a lot, is optimistic, and has a rough big-sister type personality that does not flatter men nor women. Her original name was Alexandra (アレクサンドラ, Arekusandora), but she changed her identity after faking her death to escape a Russian special forces unit and to protect her former lover Inga from potential execution for betraying her homeland. Chris was affectionately referred to by Inga as Sashenka (サーシェンカ). In the second half of the show, it seems that Chris developed some feelings for Axel after he protected and saved her, giving him a kiss as a final wish when she and the other characters were almost resigned to the death of the world.
Leland Astor (リーランド・アスター, Rīrando Asutā)
Voiced by: Yuma Uchida (Japanese); Bryson Baugus (English)
A 16-year-old teenage boy from Canada who is skilled in piloting drones. He reads the situation and speaks accordingly, but he does not say what he really thinks. He also does not like to talk about his family due to his complicated background. One of his hobbies is egosurfing. He is the sole surviving male heir to the prominent Astor family estate.
Eleina (エレイナ, Ereina)
Voiced by: Manaka Iwami (Japanese); Annie Wild (English)
A 15-year-old teenage girl from Hong Kong who has communication issues and has trouble joining in with people's conversations, but is also one of three world-famous covert hackers known as the Mad Screamer (マッドスクリーマー, Maddo Sukurīmā). As the story progresses, she becomes more open and bold, also developing a friendly rivalry with the Maldivian hacker Popcorn Wizard.

==== Associates ====
Hersch Lindemann (ハーシュ・リンデマン, Hāshu Rindeman)
Voiced by: Megumi Hayashibara (Japanese); Jade Kelly (English)
The commanding leader of the Lazarus team, an older woman who acts as their point of contact with the U.S. government. She has many connections with large corporations and national organizations. She is efficient and does her job without being swayed by emotions. She can be frightening when angry.
Abel Anderson (アベル・アンダーソン, Aberu Andāson)
Voiced by: Akio Otsuka (Japanese); Sean Patrick Judge (English)
The current director of the National Security Agency (NSA) and founder of Lazarus. He is unfazed and always remains calm. His overly rational way of thinking has led to his colleagues spreading rumors that he is actually a human AI.
Elizabeth "Liz" (エリザベス・"リズ", Erizabesu "Rizu")
Voiced by: Aoi Tada^{Ep. 7 credits} (Japanese); Kelly Greenshield^{Ep. 7 credits} (English)
The current deputy director of the NSA. Liz assists Abel with the operations of Lazarus.

=== Key antagonists ===
Dr. Deniz Skinner (デニズ・スキナー博士, Denizu Sukinā-hakase)
Voiced by: Koichi Yamadera (Japanese); David Matranga (English)
A three-time Nobel Prize recipient neuroscientist from Turkey, who has deceived humanity with his seemingly cure-all wonder drug, Hapna, which is later revealed to be a deadly poison that will kill everyone who has taken it after three years. He claims that the first wave of people will die in approximately 30 days following his announcement, unless they can track him down.
Schneider (シュナイダー, Shunaidā)
Voiced by: Kensho Ono^{Ep. 9 credits} (Japanese); N/A (English)
A lieutenant in the U.S. Army Intelligence and Security Command (INSCOM), he is deeply involved in the development of Hapna for use as a bioweapon and is secretly planning to disrupt Lazarus' activities and eliminate Axel, a key figure in the project and the lone survivor of INSCOM's confidential Hapna clinical trial on inmates at an Arizona prison. He personally hires a ghost assassin known as Soryu to kill Axel.
Soryu / HQ (双竜 / HQ)
Voiced by: Koki Uchiyama^{Ep. 9 credits} (Japanese); Scott Gibbs^{Ep. 9 credits} (English)
Soryu is an assassin known as the Ghost Assassin (幻の殺し屋, Maboroshino Koroshi-ya), and HQ is his agent who negotiates with clients. In reality, they are actually the same person suffering from dissociative identity disorder due to the Hundun Program that was conducted on him back in his homeland of China. He accepts Schneider's murder-for-hire request of killing Axel for US$30 million. Some of the weapons he uses on the job are string, throwing knives, grenades and rocket launchers.

=== Other characters ===
Kobayashi (小林)
Voiced by: Yōji Ueda^{Ep. 2 credits} (Japanese); Jay Hickman^{Ep. 2 credits} (English)
A businessman who owns survival bunkers in the U.S. state of Arizona and whose company, Kobayashi Shelter Sales, owes a lot of money.
Jill (ジル, Jiru)
Voiced by: Yuichi Nakamura^{Ep. 3 credits} (Japanese); Kiba Walker^{Ep. 3 credits} (English)
A transgender woman who was an acquaintance of Axel's during their time in prison. After her release, she adopted a female appearance and now runs a homeless village.
Claude Klein (クロード・クライン, Kurōdo Kurain)
Voiced by: Yutaka Nakano^{Ep. 3 credits} (Japanese); N/A (English)
Doug's mentor in college. He collaborated with Skinner, but became jealous of Skinner's talent and fabricated research results, leading to his firing as a professor and his eventual homelessness.
Billinda (ビリンダ, Birinda)
Voiced by: Toshiko Sawada^{Ep. 3 credits} (Japanese); Marcy Bannor^{Ep. 3 credits} (English)
Skinner's grandmother who lives in Istanbul. She raised Skinner after he lost his parents. She is known for her baklava, a baked confectionery.
Sam Stephenson (サム・スティーブンソン, Samu Sutībunson)
Voiced by: Tomokazu Sugita^{Ep. 4 credits} (Japanese); Brandon Hearnsberger^{Ep. 4 credits} (English)
A private investor who made a huge profits by selling off Delta Medicinal stock before they crashed during the Hapna scandal. A party animal who enjoys messing around with women at the nightclubs he owns.
Donald McDonald / Visionary (ドナルド・マクドナルド / ヴィジョナリー, Donarudo Makudonarudo / Vuijonarī)
Voiced by: Shōya Chiba^{Ep. 4 credits} (Japanese); Nathan Wilson^{Ep. 4 credits} (English)
On the surface, he is a popular DJ known as Visionary, but his true identity is the big-time hacker Doctor 909 (ドクター909, Dokutā Kyuhyaku-kyu), who hacked and leaked insider information from Delta Medicinal to Sam so they could both make money. He later makes a plea deal with the NSA and cooperates in discovering the true identity of the mysterious assassin known as Soryu.
Ahmed Rahman (アーメッド・ラフマン, Āmeddo Rafuman)
Voiced by: Daisuke Ono^{Ep. 5 credits} (Japanese); Luis Galindo^{Ep. 5 credits} (English)
The CEO of Delta Medicinal, which conducted clinical trials of Hapna on monkeys and humans. He has been suffering from sleep deprivation since Skinner revealed the true nature of Hapna to the world. He cooperates with Lazarus in orchestrating a fake Hapna vaccine launch at an emergency conference in an attempt to lure Skinner out.
Lynn (リン, Rin)
Voiced by: Neeko^{Ep. 5 credits} (Japanese); Brittney Karbowski^{Ep. 5 credits} (English)
A big-time hacker who calls herself Popcorn Wizard (ポップコーン・ウィザード, Poppukōn Uizādo). She infiltrates Delta Medicinal's internal network and engages in a hacking battle with Eleina, with whom she eventually befriends by the end of the series. She is originally from the Maldives, which is now submerged due to rising sea levels caused by global warming, and suffers from analgesia along with some other former Maldives residents. Lynn feels indebted to help Skinner in any way possible due to him buying up all the islands so that its local residents, including herself, could afford relocating.
Billy (ビリー, Birī)
Voiced by: Satoshi Hino^{Ep. 6 credits} (Japanese); N/A (English)
Head representative of the new age religion known as the Tower of Truth, which worships Naga as a deity. He was an associate professor at MIT, but was so fascinated with Naga that he stole him from the lab and founded the Tower of Truth commune.
Hanna (ハンナ)
Voiced by: Shion Wakayama^{Ep. 6 credits} (Japanese); N/A (English)
A childhood friend of Eleina, who was born and raised within the Tower of Truth commune. She secretly envied Eleina, who ventured out all on her own into the outside world at a young age.
Naga (ナーガ)
Voiced by: Kazuhiko Inoue^{Ep. 6 credits} (Japanese); N/A (English)
An artificial intelligence beyond the singularity and supreme deity of the Tower of Truth commune. Developed at MIT and based on Skinner's neural network, it is programmed with a desire for dominance and recognition.
Inga (インガ)
Voiced by: Sumire Uesaka^{Ep. 8 credits} (Japanese); Katelyn Barr^{Ep. 8 credits} (English)
The leader of a Russian special forces unit. Alexandra (Chris), a former comrade, was her same-sex lover. When she recognizes Chris in Fiji, she kidnaps her and takes her hostage to a Russian oil rig in the Arctic Ocean.
Sergei (セルゲイ, Serugei)
Voiced by: Hidenori Takahashi^{Ep. 8 credits} (Japanese); Jeremy Gee^{Ep. 8 credits} (English)
Inga's subordinate who physically assaults Chris in anger due to her abandonment of the Russian motherland at the oil rig hideout in the Arctic Ocean.
Hayes (ヘイズ, Heizu)
Voiced by: Kenji Hamada^{Ep. 9 credits} (Japanese); Shawn Hamilton^{Ep. 9 credits} (English)
A captain at INSCOM and fellow Green Beret of Abel's. He was involved in concealing the secrets of the development of the Hapna bioweapon together with Schneider, but was killed by Schneider after he was about to snitch him out to the colonel due to Soryu failing in his mission to eliminate Axel.
Isabella (イザベラ, Izabera)
Voiced by: Ayane Sakura^{Ep. 10 credits} (Japanese); N/A (English)
Leland's older sister and member of the Astor family. She has mixed feelings towards Leland, who left the Astor household due to being an illegitimate heir born from his father's mistress. She could not inherit the Astor family's estate due to being a woman.
Millie (ミリー, Mirī)
Voiced by: Yoshiko Sakakibara^{Ep. 10 credits} (Japanese); Jasmine Renee Thomas^{Ep. 10 credits} (English)
A physician who works for a private medical society for the privileged and wealthy. She once performed artificial heart surgery on Skinner.

== Production and release ==
The series was announced by Adult Swim in July 2023, and was directed by Shinichirō Watanabe, most notable for directing the Cowboy Bebop anime series. Chad Stahelski, who is notable for directing the John Wick film franchise, designed the action sequences. For music composition, the series features a score by jazz saxophonist Kamasi Washington, and producers, DJs, and musicians Bonobo and Floating Points. Animation for the series was done by MAPPA, while Sola Entertainment handled general production.

A teaser trailer for the series was shown at Adult Swim's "Toonami on the Green" panel at San Diego Comic-Con two days later on July 22. In July 2024, it was announced that the series would air in 2025.

In an interview conducted in October 2024, Watanabe said that the opioid crisis was one of the inspirations he had for creating the anime. The effects of climate change also played a major role in the series.

Watanabe also talks about how the production team worked closely with Stahelski so that they could be provided with fight scene choreographies and on how the team needed to recruit animators outside Japan due to a lack of experienced domestic animators that could animate such sequences. In a November 2024 interview, Watanabe mentioned that he held the John Wick films in high regard on how the fight scenes were choreographed.

In December 2024, a new visual was released along with the announcement that Kamasi Washington performed the opening theme song "Vortex", while the Boo Radleys performed the ending theme song "Lazarus". "Dark Will Fall", performed by Bonobo featuring Jacob Lusk, and "Beyond the Sky", performed by Bonobo featuring Nicole Miglis, are used as insert songs at the beginnings of the first and ninth episodes, respectively. "Dark Will Fall" is also used as the ending theme for the final episode.

In January 2025, it was announced that the series would broadcast in Japan beginning in April 2025 on TV Tokyo and its affiliates, accompanied by the release of a new visual. Adult Swim followed up with an announcement shortly thereafter on Instagram that the series would also air the same month on its network. In February 2025, it was announced the series would air on April 6, 2025, in near-simultaneous broadcasts in both Japan and the United States. (Note: Adult Swim listed the series premiere as airing on April 5 at midnight (24:00) EDT/PDT, which is effectively April 6.)

In an interview with Cocotame in April 2025, Watanabe mentioned that his plans for the anime started back in 2018 after working on Carole & Tuesday, with actual production starting in 2021. Watanabe states that during most of their remote meetings they were shown action sequences, which were shot with the help of stuntmen for scenes that Watanabe wanted to animate. Otherwise, hand-drawn and CGI were used as alternatives. Early into production, Keiko Nobumoto, who was originally set to be a co-creator and writer, died due to esophageal cancer on December 1, 2021. Watanabe noted that her spirit lived on during production for the series, which was ultimately done as a tribute to her.

Each episode title is directly named after music albums, singles or extended plays from around the second half of the 20th century.

=== Episodes ===
No.	Title	Directed by	Written by	Storyboarded by	Chief animation directed by	Original release date
1	"Goodbye Cruel World"	Kazuo Miyake & Youhei Tsuchiya	Shinichirō Watanabe	Shinichirō Watanabe	Akemi Hayashi	April 6, 2025
Opening monologue by: Doug Inmate Axel Gilberto is visited in prison by a woman named Hersch, who fills him in on the current situation: after disappearing without a trace three years ago, the genius neuroscientist Dr. Skinner has resurfaced in an online video to reveal that his miracle painkiller "Hapna" will kill everyone who has taken it three years after the first dose, with the first wave of victims set to come in approximately 30 days. While the U.S. government tries desperately to find a cure, the only sure way to prevent the medication's massacre is to find Dr. Skinner himself and force him to reverse the effects of Hapna before the 30 days have passed. However, Axel is uninterested, instead using Hersch's visit as an opportunity to escape prison. While the world is currently in chaos following Dr. Skinner's announcement, Axel uses the confusion to escape, but finds himself hunted down by a team of pursuers, one of whom manages to incapacitate him with a high-tech electroshock bracelet. One day later, Axel wakes up in an abandoned barbershop, where Hersch tells him via video chat that he has been selected to join her team, codenamed "Lazarus". 29 Days Left...
2	"Life in the Fast Lane"	Tsuyoshi Tobita	Tsukasa Kondō	Tensai Okamura	Akemi Hayashi & Keiichi Kondō	April 13, 2025
Opening monologue by: Leland Every Lazarus member, including Axel, has gotten into trouble with law enforcement and are donning tracking bracelets that will burn if they attempt to take them off. Axel holds Lazarus member Chris at gunpoint and demands that Hersch remove his bracelet. She refuses, knowing that he will not pull the trigger. Axel gives up and joins Lazarus in their search for Dr. Skinner. After learning that Skinner purchased a survival bunker in Arizona eight years before, Axel and Chris head there while Lazarus members Doug and Leland go to the office of the company that produced the bunkers. Inside the bunker, Axel and Chris encounter a man sitting in a chair before getting shot at by Mexican and Russian agents, while Doug and Leland are held at gunpoint by two men at the office. After the FBI and DEA arrive in the bunker, it is revealed that the man in the chair is actually the site's owner, Mr. Kobayashi, who was hiding in Skinner's bunker to avoid debt collectors back at his office. Meanwhile, Lazarus member Eleina uses facial recognition technology to look for Skinner, but his face is being digitally edited onto thousands of other people's bodies. 28 Days Left...
3	"Long Way From Home"	Youhei Tsuchiya	Takahiro Ozawa	Kazuo Miyake & Shigeyuki Miya	Eriko Itō	April 20, 2025
Opening monologue by: Chris According to Eleina, only three hackers can fool facial recognition technology, including herself. While she constructs bait for these hackers, Axel and Doug talk to Claude Klein, the latter's university mentor who previously worked with Skinner. Klein is now homeless and mentions that Skinner's grandmother Billinda lives in Istanbul and supposedly makes the best baklavas. Meanwhile, Chris and Leland visit Skinner's house to search for possible clues under the guise of cleaners. The team eventually regroups and sends Axel and Leland to Istanbul to try to locate Billinda. After a confrontation with a mob there, the two manage to find her house after clearing up a misunderstanding. They meet Billinda, who raised Skinner after his parents' death. Billinda states that she has not had much contact with him since he became a world-renowned neuroscientist. Under the assumption that Skinner would want to make sure Billinda is safe, Axel finds a hidden camera in the house and tells it that he is coming after him. Meanwhile, Dr. 909 falls for Eleina's digital bait. 26 Days Left...
4	"Don't Stop the Dance"	Kazuo Miyake	Dai Satō	Akihiko Yamashita	Hiroyuki Aoyama (Note: De facto via animation director credits)	April 27, 2025
Opening monologue by: Eleina Eleina manages to hack into Dr. 909's hidden wallet and discovers that he is working with Sam Stephenson, an investor who sold off all his Hapna stock before Skinner's announcement. The Lazarus team deduces that Dr. 909 helped Skinner disappear in return for information about Hapna. With Sam being their only link to Dr. 909, the team decides to infiltrate one of his exclusive club parties. Meanwhile, Eleina continues to investigate the deposits made to the wallet, as they originate from physical ATMs located around the world, and discovers that Dr. 909's true identity is the world-famous DJ Visionary, who also happens to be performing at the party. The team attempts to apprehend both Sam and Dr. 909, who flee the club via helicopter. Aided by one of Leland's drones, Axel is able to shoot the helicopter down. Axel interrogates both men, but neither of them seems to have any connection with Skinner. It is then revealed that Dr. 909 uncovered Hapna's true nature after hacking pharmaceutical company Delta Medicinal, proving that they knew about Hapna's dangers while also suggesting that they colluded with Skinner. Elsewhere, a monkey among many kept in a lab dies. 24 Days Left...
5	"Pretty Vacant"	Kazuo Miyake	Tsukasa Kondō	Iwao Teraoka	Tadashi Hiramatsu & Kojikoji	May 4, 2025
Opening monologue by: Axel The Lazarus team discovers that Delta Medical has been covertly distributing data for the Hapna clinical trials to Skinner via SoundCloud in an audio file format and directly confront the company's CEO, Dr. Ahmed Rahman. Rahman claims that he had no prior knowledge that Hapna was dangerous and that he does not know where Skinner is either. He confirms that Skinner's claims about Hapna are real, as the monkey test subjects that had taken Hapna prior to human trials have already begun to die, leaving a constellation-like pattern in their eyes. Tired of trying to chase after Skinner, Axel suggests that they try to lure him out into the open, and Rahman agrees to host a conference claiming that the company found a cure to Hapna as bait. Despite heavy security, the master hacker Popcorn Wizard penetrates Delta Medicinal's internal network and steals information on the antidote, discovering that it is indeed fake. Eleina tracks Popcorn Wizard's location to the Pakistan Stock Exchange building complex, but she manages to evade local authorities and escape via van. Popcorn Wizard proceeds to call Eleina and compliment her for being the individual who came the closest to catching her. 21 Days Left...
6	"Heaven is a Place on Earth"	Eiji Abiko	Takahiro Ozawa	Nobutake Ito	Tadashi Hiramatsu	May 11, 2025
15 years before, Skinner visited a religious cult commune that worships Naga, an AI completely disconnected from the outside world within a remote compound called "The Tower of the Truth". Eleina was raised there and can use her past connections to infiltrate the site. She returns to the commune with Leland, who poses as new convert. While the rest of Lazarus standby at a nearby motel, Doug learns that Naga uses Skinner's brain scan as its base model. Billy, the commune's leader, is one of Naga's former MIT researchers. He stole the AI and founded the commune to foster its development. Later that night, Eleina and Leland are caught trying to hack into Naga and are sentenced to be burned to death the following day, while the rest of the commune plans to also die the same way in a mass suicide. During the ceremony, Eleina's old friend Hanna sets off a smoke bomb that signals the rest of Lazarus into action. The FBI also commences their own raid on the commune, and everybody is rescued except for Billy, who seemingly dies when Naga collapses on him during the fire. Lazarus recovers Naga's memory bank for analyzation. 17 Days Left...
7	"Almost Blue"	Ka Hee Im & Heihachiro Haitani	Takahiro Ozawa	Tensai Okamura	Akemi Hayashi & Tadashi Hiramatsu	May 18, 2025
The last ice floe in the Arctic melts due to global warming. Lazarus remembers that Skinner predicted this event exactly three years before. Naga's memory bank analyzation is completed and outputs four oceanic coordinates in or near Manila Bay, the Maldives, the Sakishima Islands, and Tuvalu. Skinner purchased land from these coordinates shortly before they were submerged by rising sea levels a decade before. Doug goes to Manila, Axel goes to the Maldives, Leland goes to Sakishima, and Chris goes to Tuvalu. All four locations have something in common: most of the local residents suffered from a genetic form of analgesia; they cannot feel any pain. Skinner bought their islands to give them the money needed to relocate before they fully submerged. Eleina traces the money back to the defunct Hague Institute, where Hersch used to work under Skinner. Elsewhere, Hersch meets with Abel, who warns her that the U.S. Army Intelligence Corps is searching for Axel. Hersch believes that Skinner left a trail of clues because he wants to be found. Returning back to land in Fiji, Chris encounters a woman she recognizes who calls her out by her real name, Alexandra. 14 Days Left...
8	"Unforgettable Fire"	Youhei Tsuchiya	Tsukasa Kondō	Akihiko Yamashita	Manabu Akita & Akemi Hayashi	May 25, 2025
Chris is taken prisoner by the Russian spy team she was once part of, led by agent Inga. At headquarters, the rest of Lazarus confronts Hersch about her past ties with Skinner. She admits her connection to Skinner and that she also was recruited by the NSA. To rescue Chris, the team heads out to the oil rig in the Barents Sea that she is being held captive on. Axel infiltrates the rig and helps Eleina gain access to its systems, while Doug rams a remote-controlled tanker into the rig to provide a distraction, which also ignites a fire. Taking advantage of the chaos, Chris escapes her captors and reunites with Axel. As Axel departs to neutralize some of Inga's men, Inga confronts Chris. Chris admits that she faked her own death because it was the only way to escape Russia without having Inga also branded as a traitor and executed. Chris and Inga were lovers. Chris is willing to let Inga kill her. Inga, however, hesitates. One of Inga's men arrives and attempts to kill Chris, causing Inga to sacrifice herself by taking the bullet instead. Axel and Chris manage to escape the enflamed rig as it begins to collapse. 12 Days Left...
9	"Death on Two Legs"	Sayaka Morikawa	Dai Satō	Youhei Tsuchiya	Tadashi Hiramatsu	June 1, 2025
As Chris recovers from her injuries, Doug privately converses with Axel about the possibility of Lazarus being erased as a loose end if they complete their mission. Meanwhile, Abel and Hersch attend a committee hearing at the Pentagon where their superiors criticize Lazarus's lack of progress in finding Skinner, as well as the public incidents that their missions caused. One of Abel's rivals, Schneider from INSCOM, brings in Leland as a witness to testify against Lazarus, but he instead ends up defending the group. During the hearing, Skinner releases a second video, lamenting that humanity does not appear to be interested in finding him. As the first human test subject, he will be the first to die from Hapna in ten days. Because of the video, Abel earns a ten-day extension to resume Lazarus' activities. Abel and Hersch suspect foul play from INSCOM, while Chris recalls a pill she recovered from Skinner's home and asks Doug to analyze it. Schneider suspects that Abel is covering up Axel's past and hires assassin Soryu to eliminate him. As a test, Schneider sends a U.S. Army Special Forces unit after Soryu, who kills them all. 10 Days Left...
10	"I Can't Tell You Why"	Kazuo Miyake	Takahiro Ozawa	Akihiko Yamashita	Akemi Hayashi	June 8, 2025
Hospitals experience surges in fever patients, prompting government stay-at-home warnings. Chris' earlier discovery of a pill at Skinner's home is identified as medication for artificial heart recipients. Lazarus suspects Skinner had a transplant, but Eleina finds no medical records. Hersch recalls rumors of a private clinic performing confidential surgeries. Leland offers help and brings Axel and Doug to his estranged family's mansion. His sister Isabella agrees to grant access to the clinic if Leland spends the weekend with her. At the clinic, Millie, Leland's late father's physician, confirms Skinner had an artificial heart, though its telemetry was encrypted post-surgery. She gives them a flash drive containing the device's firmware. Meanwhile, Abel shows Hersch leaked footage from Schiphol Airport in Amsterdam, where a gaseous Hapna prototype carried by Skinner accidentally released after Delta Force shot through his briefcase. Abel links this prototype to a confidential trial at an Arizona prison. Axel, the survivor of those trials, is assigned to locate the prison doctor. Meanwhile, telemetry data reveals the artificial heart is being monitored from Pakistan, home of Popcorn Wizard. Doug agrees to go there with Eleina. Axel's mission is interrupted by a grenade explosion and traffic jam, just before Soryu approaches. 6 Days Left...
11	"Runnin' with the Devil"	Youhei Tsuchiya & Yasutomo Okamoto	Tsukasa Kondō	Akihiko Yamashita	Manabu Akita	June 15, 2025
Hersch goes to INSCOM headquarters to meet with Schneider to get him to call off his men by blackmailing him about the Hapna prototype clinical trials in the Arizona prison, but it backfires and she is detained on the grounds of treason. Doug and an increasingly ill Eleina arrive in Pakistan but are soon tailed by U.S. Army men sent by INSCOM. Doug pretends to surrender to the men so that Eleina can escape via scooter. In the ensuing struggle, Doug is injured by a buttstroke before stopping one of the men attempting to chase after Eleina. Eleina locates Popcorn Wizard before collapsing from her fever. In the U.S., Soryu fights Axel. Abel gives Chris clearance to use a rifle to help Axel as he goes to rescue Hersch, leaving Leland behind at headquarters. Axel and Soryu's fight ends on a boat. During it, Soryu is distracted by a winged pendant that Axel wears around his neck, as it reminds him of the myth of the Hundun that was told to him during his violent upbringing as an assassin. Soryu spears Axel with a harpoon on a dock before escaping into the river's waters due to Chris' arrival. 5 Days Left...
12	"Close to the Edge"	Eiji Abiko	Shinichirō Watanabe	Akihiko Yamashita	Tadashi Hiramatsu	June 22, 2025
A gravely injured Axel is brought to Millie's clinic for treatment and discovers that the witness he was supposed to secure has been killed. Eleina awakes to find herself under the care of Popcorn Wizard, whose real name is Lynn. Lynn is one of the former Maldives residents suffering from analgesia and is helping Skinner hide due to him helping her community escape the sinking islands. Following Skinner's instructions, Lynn reveals that he is hiding in a homeless community camp in Babylonia City. Abel recruits Dr. 909 to investigate Soryu. Abel convinces the ill U.S. president to give an executive order for the NSA to raid INSCOM. Abel then goes to confront Schneider. Meanwhile, Doug finds himself in a Pakistani hospital under the custody of the men who assaulted him. Eleina and Lynn help him escape the hospital and the pair rush back to Babylonia City. Axel admits to Chris that he likes being part of Lazarus after spending most of his life alone after losing friends as a child. Lazarus discovers that Soryu is suffering from dissociative identity disorder due to being part of the Hundun Program. While recovering from his injuries, Axel receives a cryptic text message. 1 Day Left...
13	"The World Is Yours"	Kazuo Miyake	Shinichirō Watanabe	Akihiko Yamashita	Akemi Hayashi	June 29, 2025
Axel deciphers the message as a challenge from Soryu and leaves the clinic. Meanwhile, Abel arrests Schneider for developing a bioweapon derived from Hapna and frees Hersch, who sets out to find Skinner. Axel and Soryu face off atop Babylonia Tower, which ends in Soryu being crushed to death by falling debris caused from the tower's statue collapsing. Chris retrieves Axel and the team assembles at the homeless camp to confront Skinner. Abel reveals Skinner knew about INSCOM's Hapna-based bioweapon and attempted to smuggle out a sample. During Delta Force's confrontation at Schiphol Airport, the sample accidentally released, killing many present. All core Lazarus members survived that incident, rendering them immune to Hapna. Skinner hands over the cure's structural formula to Hersch, but confesses he lost faith in humanity after the airport incident and asks Axel if the world deserves saving. Axel responds that, while flawed, the world still holds things worth protecting. Skinner then succumbs to Hapna. Abel relieves Lazarus of their duties and grants them full pardons before offering them the choice of continuing to work together to solve the world's problems. They all accept the invitation to stay. The Hapna cure is quickly mass produced and distributed globally. 0 Days Left For Us.

== Reception ==
=== Critical response ===
Lazarus received mostly positive reviews. On review aggregator website Rotten Tomatoes, the series holds an approval rating of 92% based on 24 reviews. The site's critics consensus reads, "Recalling the entrancing atmosphere of Shinichirō Watanabe's past works if not quite matching their high bar for originality, Lazarus is a kinetic anime with no shortage of provocative ideas." The series was on the top 10 streaming charts worldwide, with its Netflix Japan streaming peaking at sixth place. The series was also in the top 10 on Amazon Prime Video Japan, HBO Max in several international countries, and Vidio in Indonesia.

Ryan Gaur of IGN gave the first five episodes of the series a score of 5/10. He described the anime as a disappointing directorial return for Watanabe, as he felt the series was deprived of the energy and joy of his previous directorial works. He criticized the lead characters as acting too unbothered and invulnerable to the dangers they faced at that point. However, he also stated that the apocalyptic stakes provided an intriguing concept, and that the action scenes showed a few instances of creativity, leaving the door open for a possible revised opinion once all the episodes were released.

=== Accolades ===
On July 16, 2025, Lazarus was nominated at the 77th Primetime Emmy Awards for "Outstanding Original Main Title Theme Music". In 2026, the series won "Best Original Anime" at the 10th Crunchyroll Anime Awards. The series' composers Kamasi Washington, Bonobo, and Floating Points won "Best Original Score for Animation" at the Music Awards Japan in the same year. The series was nominated in the Daruma for Best Anime, Suspense Anime, and Original Soundtrack categories at the Japan Expo Awards in the same year.

== Potential sequel ==
Despite Adult Swim promoting the final episode as the series finale, Watanabe mentioned the possibility of a potential sequel in July 2025, stating "Since there are still many problems left in the world, the team will continue to be active. Their story is far from over."
