= Live... in the Heart of the City =

Live...in the Heart of the City
- Cover art by Jeff Cummins

Live album by Whitesnake
- Released: 3 November 1980
- Recorded: 23 November 1978; 23 and 24 June 1980
- Venue: Hammersmith Odeon, London
- Genre: Hard rock; blues rock
- Length: 80:22
- Label: Liberty/EMI (UK and Germany); Mirage/Atlantic (North America); Polydor (Japan); United Artists (Rest of the world)
- Producer: Martin Birch

Whitesnake chronology
Ready an' Willing (1980)	Live...in the Heart of the City (1980)	Come an' Get It (1981)

Live at Hammersmith cover
- 1980 Japanese live LP.

Singles from Live...in the Heart of the City
- 1. "Ain't No Love in the Heart of the City" Released: 7 November 1980

Professional ratings
Review scores
Source	Rating
AllMusic	3/5 stars
Classic Rock	4.5/5 stars
Collector's Guide to Heavy Metal	5/10
MusicHound Rock	3/5 stars

Live...in the Heart of the City is a 1980 live album by British rock band Whitesnake. Originally released as a double-vinyl album, and double-play cassette, it utilises recordings made in 1978 and 1980. The album charted at number 5 on the UK Albums Chart with Platinum certification, and number 146 on the Billboard 200. The Classic Rock magazine in 2011 and 2023 placed it among the best live albums ever.

== Release ==
Sides one and two of the vinyl are recordings made with the Rolling Stones Mobile Studio at the Hammersmith Odeon, during the band's 1980 World Tour.

Sides three and four are from a 1978 recording, previously released in Japan in March 1980 as Live at Hammersmith.

In North America, the album was released as a single record, excluding the live material from 1978.

The first UK CD version (EMI CZD 94) was a double set, issued in 1988, in what is now known as a 'fat-boy' double-CD case. Sides one and two of the 2-LP set were CD1; sides three and four were CD2.

The later 1994 release was a single CD version, the 1978 recording of "Come On" being dropped to match the restrictive running time of the single CD.

Live...in the Heart of the City has since been remastered and was released in March 2007 as a 2-CD set (in a slimline double-CD case), once again featuring all the tracks of the original album, plus a 1980 recording of "Ain't No Love in the Heart of the City". In February 2011 it was released as a red vinyl 2-LP.

The 1978 performance of Might Just Take Your Life, originally recorded by singer David Coverdale and keyboardist Jon Lord as members of Deep Purple in 1974, featured guitarist Bernie Marsden singing the middle eight part as originally sung by Glenn Hughes on the Deep Purple recording.

The sleeve art is by British artist Jeff Cummins.

"We were sent on some silly promotional stunt for the album that involved a circus elephant," recalled David Coverdale. "Yes, an elephant, not a snake. Lord knows why".

== Reception ==
In a 2023 retrospective "Album Of The Week Club review", Classic Rock gave it a 4.5/5 stars, considering it a great live album, one of band's masterpieces that has stood well the test of time. The same magazine in 2011 included it on the list of "Live Albums That Changed the World", and in 2023 placed it as 38th out of 50 on the list of best live albums ever.

== Track listing ==
=== Live in the Heart of the City (23/24 June 1980) ===
Side one
No.	Title	Writer(s)	From the album	Length
1.	"Come On"	David Coverdale, Bernie Marsden	Snakebite (1978)	3:38
2.	"Sweet Talker"	Coverdale, Marsden	Ready an' Willing (1980)	4:16
3.	"Walking in the Shadow of the Blues"	Coverdale, Marsden	Lovehunter (1979)	5:00
4.	"Love Hunter"	Coverdale, Micky Moody, Marsden	Lovehunter	10:41

Side two
No.	Title	Writer(s)	From the album	Length
5.	"Fool for Your Loving"	Coverdale, Moody, Marsden	Ready an' Willing	4:58
6.	"Ain't Gonna Cry No More"	Coverdale, Moody	Ready an' Willing	6:21
7.	"Ready an' Willing"	Coverdale, Moody, Neil Murray, Jon Lord, Ian Paice	Ready an' Willing	4:46
8.	"Take Me with You"	Coverdale, Moody	Trouble (1978)	6:28

=== Live at Hammersmith (23 November 1978) ===
Side three
No.	Title	Writer(s)	From the album	Length
1.	"Come On"	Coverdale, Marsden	Snakebite	3:32
2.	"Might Just Take Your Life" (Deep Purple cover)	Coverdale, Ritchie Blackmore, Lord, Paice	Burn (1974)	4:55
3.	"Lie Down"	Coverdale, Moody	Trouble	3:33
4.	"Ain't No Love in the Heart of the City" (Bobby Bland cover)	Michael Price, Dan Walsh	Snakebite	6:38

Side four
No.	Title	Writer(s)	From the album	Length
5.	"Trouble"	Coverdale, Marsden	Trouble	4:56
6.	"Mistreated" (Deep Purple cover)	Coverdale, Blackmore	Burn	10:40

=== Single CD version ===
No.	Title	Length
1.	"Come On"	3:38
2.	"Sweet Talker"	4:16
3.	"Walking in the Shadow of the Blues"	5:00
4.	"Love Hunter"	10:41
5.	"Fool for Your Loving"	4:58
6.	"Ain't Gonna Cry No More"	6:21
7.	"Ready an' Willing"	4:46
8.	"Might Just Take Your Life"	5:35
9.	"Ain't No Love in the Heart of the City"	6:03
10.	"Mistreated"	10:49
Total length:		62:07

=== Double CD version ===
Remastered Edition 2007 – Disc one
No.	Title	Length
1.	"Come On"	3:38
2.	"Sweet Talker"	4:16
3.	"Walking in the Shadow of the Blues"	5:00
4.	"Love Hunter"	10:41
5.	"Ain't No Love in the Heart of the City"	7:21
6.	"Fool for Your Loving"	4:58
7.	"Ain't Gonna Cry No More"	6:21
8.	"Ready an' Willing"	4:46
9.	"Take Me with You"	6:28
Total length:		53:29

Remastered Edition 2007 – Disc two
No.	Title	Length
1.	"Come On"	3:22
2.	"Might Just Take Your Life"	5:35
3.	"Lie Down"	4:41
4.	"Ain't No Love in the Heart of the City"	6:03
5.	"Trouble"	4:51
6.	"Mistreated"	10:49
Total length:		35:21

- 2011 red vinyl 2-LP is 2007's edition but "Take Me with You" is on 2nd LP.

== Personnel ==
=== Whitesnake ===
- David Coverdale – vocals
- Micky Moody – guitar, backing vocals
- Bernie Marsden – guitar, backing vocals, additional lead vocal on Might Just Take Your Life
- Neil Murray – bass guitar
- Ian Paice – drums on disc 1 recordings from 1980
- Dave Dowle – drums on disc 2 recordings from 1978 (not credited in the original printing)
- Jon Lord – keyboards

=== Production ===
- Martin Birch – producer, engineer

== Charts ==
Chart (1980–81)	Peak position
German Albums (Offizielle Top 100)	56
Japanese Albums (Oricon)	53
UK Albums (OCC)	5
US Billboard 200	146

== Certifications ==
Region	Certification	Certified units/sales
United Kingdom (BPI)	Platinum	300,000^{^}
^{^} Shipments figures based on certification alone.
