= Trouble (Whitesnake album) =

- Original UK sleeve

Studio album by Whitesnake
- Released: October 1978
- Recorded: July–August 1978
- Studio: Central Recorders (London)
- Genre: Hard rock; blues rock
- Length: 38:20
- Label: EMI International (UK); Harvest/Sunburst (Europe); United Artists/Sunburst (North America); Polydor (Japan)
- Producer: Martin Birch

Whitesnake chronology
Snakebite (1978)	Trouble (1978)	Lovehunter (1979)

Alternative cover
- Original US cover

Singles from Trouble
- 1. "Lie Down (A Modern Love Song)" Released: 29 September 1978; 2. "Day Tripper" Released: 1 December 1978 (Ger.); 3. "The Time Is Right for Love" Released: 2 March 1979

Professional ratings
Review scores
Source	Rating
AllMusic	3/5 stars
Collector's Guide to Heavy Metal	6/10

Trouble is the debut studio album from British rock band Whitesnake, led by former Deep Purple vocalist David Coverdale released in October 1978. It reached No. 50 on the UK Albums Chart. This followed the four-track Snakebite EP, later available in the US as an import album from continental Europe. It received a CD release on 8 April 1988 in the UK. EMI remastered the album in 2007, adding six bonus tracks, mainly rough mixes. The album later received a reissue by EMI/Parlophone in 2006, containing bonus tracks from their previous EP (not counting four David Coverdale's Northwinds tracks previously on the double EP version).

== Background ==
In March 1976, David Coverdale had left the English hard rock group Deep Purple and retreated to record two of his solo albums, White Snake and Northwinds. One of Coverdale's solo albums featured former Snafu guitarist Micky Moody, whom Coverdale had known since the late 1960s. Moody was the first to join Coverdale's backing band, which he began assembling in London. As stated by Coverdale, "Whitesnake were actually formed to promote Northwinds on a one-off promotional tour". Moody suggested bringing in a second guitarist, with the spot ultimately going to Bernie Marsden, formerly of UFO and Paice Ashton Lord. With his help, the band recruited bassist Neil Murray, who had played with Marsden in Cozy Powell's Hammer. The group's initial line-up was rounded out by drummer Dave "Duck" Dowle and keyboardist Brian Johnston, who had played together in Streetwalkers. Other early candidates for the band were drummers Cozy Powell and Dave Holland, as well as guitarist Mel Galley, with Powell and Galley eventually joining in 1982.

The band, dubbed David Coverdale's Whitesnake, played their first show at Lincoln Technical College on 3 March 1978. Their live debut had originally been scheduled for 23 February at the Sky Bird Club in Nottingham, but the show was cancelled. Originally, the band’s name was titled “David Coverdale’s Whitesnake” due to Coverdale’s popularity over Deep Purple. In a 2009 interview with Metro, Coverdale jokingly stated that the name "Whitesnake" was a euphemism for his penis, which came from the title of his first solo album.

After completing a small UK club tour, the band adjourned to a rehearsal place in London's West End to begin writing new songs. They soon caught the attention of EMI International's Robbie Dennis, who wanted to sign the group. According to Bernie Marsden, however, his higher-ups were not ready to commit to a full album. Thus, the band entered London's Central Recorders Studio in April 1978 to record an EP. By this point, original keyboardist Brian Johnston had been replaced by Pete Solley. Martin Birch, who had worked with Coverdale during his time in Deep Purple, was chosen to produce.

The resulting record, Snakebite, was released in June 1978. When Snakebite reached number 61 on the UK Singles Chart, the band were signed to EMI.

== Production & composition ==
In July 1978, the band entered Central Recorders in London to begin work on their first proper studio album with Martin Birch producing. The recording and mixing only took ten days. In the sessions, Bernie Marsden and Micky Moody provided guitar parts and solos separately while also performing the backing vocals. On the contrary, Marsden does the lead vocals, “Free Flight” for that instance, which shot him on his following 1979 solo album “And About Time Too”. Neil Murray, who was a member since the incarnation of the band performed bass tracks. Dave Dowle recorded the drumming parts on that record, featuring his first appearance on the latter before he was replaced by Ian Paice in 1980. Towards the end of the sessions, Pete Solley's keyboard parts were completely replaced by Coverdale's former Deep Purple bandmate Jon Lord, who agreed to join Whitesnake after much coaxing from Coverdale. Colin Towns and Tony Ashton had also been approached, having previously played with fellow Deep Purple offshoots the Ian Gillan Band and Paice Ashton Lord, respectively.

On the lyrics, the writing was mostly commenced by Coverdale, except "Day Tripper" (written by John Lennon and Paul McCartney) while Moody and Marsden contributed to some of the writing towards the tracks. All of the band's lineup wrote "Don't Mess With Me", which labeled the band as the credits themselves.

According to Coverdale, one of the reasons the album was called "Trouble", was that his first child was born during the album's recording.

== Album cover ==
The original album cover for Trouble features a graphic design of a snake. Although the design was uncredited, Marsden speculated in a 2011 interview that Coverdale was "almost solely responsible" for the cover art. Coverdale himself studied graphic design in college, which he felt that "all the artsy fartsy stuff appeals to me... I have great energy for it." He wanted Whitesnake to have "strong logos" that would eventually place them in worldwide fame. He also said that Whitesnake art covers is "the initial seduction to grab your attention when you walk in the record store."

On the American releases, the sleeve was created by United Artists Records's illustrator Bill Imhoff and designer Bill Burks. It resembled a snake being born from a purple egg. Coverdale said that another cover was produced because the band's American label wanted a different cover art, which he referred to as the American design, to be more interesting. Marsden liked the cover art in that latter, because "it was an American idea."

== Track listing ==
Side one
No.	Title	Writer(s)	Length
1.	"Take Me with You"	David Coverdale, Micky Moody	4:45
2.	"Love to Keep You Warm"	Coverdale	3:44
3.	"Lie Down (A Modern Love Song)"	Coverdale, Moody	3:14
4.	"Day Tripper"	John Lennon, Paul McCartney	3:47
5.	"Nighthawk (Vampire Blues)"	Coverdale, Bernie Marsden	3:39

Side two
No.	Title	Writer(s)	Length
6.	"The Time Is Right for Love"	Coverdale, Marsden, Moody	3:26
7.	"Trouble"	Coverdale, Marsden	4:48
8.	"Belgian Tom's Hat Trick (Instrumental)"	Moody	3:26
9.	"Free Flight"	Coverdale, Marsden	4:06
10.	"Don't Mess with Me"	Coverdale, Moody, Marsden, Neil Murray, Jon Lord, Dave Dowle	3:25

2006 bonus tracks (Snakebite EP)
No.	Title	Writer(s)	Length
11.	"Come On"	Coverdale, Marsden	3:32
12.	"Bloody Mary"	Coverdale, Moody, Marsden, Murray, Lord, Paice	3:21
13.	"Steal Away"	Coverdale, Moody, Marsden, Murray, Pete Solley, Dowle	4:19
14.	"Ain't No Love in the Heart of the City"	Michael Price, Dan Walsh	5:06

== Personnel ==
Credits are adapted from the album's liner notes.

Whitesnake

- David Coverdale – lead vocals (all but 9)
- Micky Moody – guitar, backing vocals
- Bernie Marsden – guitar, backing vocals, additional lead vocal (3), lead vocals (9)
- Neil Murray – bass guitar
- Dave Dowle – drums
- Jon Lord – keyboards

Technical

- Martin Birch – producer, recorder

Design

- Bill Burks – art direction, design (USA Cover)
- Bill Imhoff – illustration (USA Cover)

Reissue

- Greg Fulginiti – remastering (at Artisan Sound Recorders) (1987 Geffen Records reissue)

== Charts ==
Chart (1978)	Peak position
UK Albums (OCC)	50

Chart (2006)	Peak position
Japanese Albums (Oricon)	215
