= Lovehunter =

- Cover art by Chris Achilleos

Studio album by Whitesnake
- Released: 21 September 1979
- Recorded: May 1979
- Studio: Rolling Stones Mobile, Clearwell Castle, Gloucestershire
- Genre: Hard rock; blues rock
- Length: 41:15
- Label: United Artists; Polydor (Japan)
- Producer: Martin Birch

Whitesnake chronology
Trouble (1978)	Lovehunter (1979)	Ready an' Willing (1980)

Singles from Lovehunter
- 1. "Long Way from Home" Released: 26 October 1979

Lovehunter is the second studio album by the British rock band Whitesnake, released on 21 September 1979. It was the bands first UK Top 30 album, charting at No. 29 on the UK Albums Chart. "Long Way from Home", the leading track on the album reached No. 55 on the UK charts, while "Walking in the Shadow of the Blues" is one of the most popular and praised Whitesnake-songs from their early years. The album became controversial because of its cover art.

== Background ==
The band worked on the album at Clearwell Castle. Like their two previous recordings it was also produced by Martin Birch. It was the group's last album to feature Dave Dowle, before being replaced by ex-Purple drummer Ian Paice.

Marsden recalled that at the time band members argued in "a good, healthy, positive" way and "because of that the band got better and more successful with Ready An' Willing (1980) and Come an' Get It (1981)". He considered it a good record, a sentiment Coverdale didn't share and would have rather released it as an EP.

Both Coverdale and Marsden considered "Walking in the Shadow of the Blues" as one of their best compositions, with Coverdale stating that the song "really summed up my musical approach of the time. It was very much my feeling, my perspective and probably my life's philosophy back then ... Bernie and I put the music together very quickly. It was obviously meant to be as a song. I'm very proud of that one". Eduardo Rivadavia writing for AllMusic described it as combining "near-perfect songwriting with one of Coverdale's maturest and most compelling lyrics".

== Cover art ==
Lovehunter's controversial cover art, showing a naked woman straddling a large snake and blood on her hand from a snake bite, was created by fantasy artist Chris Achilleos. Coverdale recalls such an idea was made as response to the critics, "just to piss them off even more". Actually, it did spur more journalistic criticism for sexism, and the cover was "banned" at the time in the USA (woman was partly covered with a sticker; album sold "in a brown paper bag") and Argentina (woman was partly airbrushed with a "chain-mail bikini bottom").

It was the last album cover Achilleos designed for many years, until 2003 and Gary Hughes' rock opera Once and Future King Part I. The original Lovehunter artwork was stolen in the 1980s.

== Critical reception ==
Professional ratings
Review scores
Source	Rating
AllMusic	3/5 stars
Collector's Guide to Heavy Metal	7/10
The Rolling Stone Album Guide	2/5 stars

The Rolling Stone Album Guide noted that "the playing is as good as on any early-'70s Deep Purple album."

== Track listing ==
Side one

1. "Long Way from Home" (David Coverdale) – 4:58
2. "Walking in the Shadow of the Blues" (Coverdale, Bernie Marsden) – 4:26
3. "Help Me Thro' the Day" (Leon Russell) – 4:40
4. "Medicine Man" (Coverdale) – 4:00
5. "You 'n' Me" (Coverdale, Marsden) – 3:25

Side two

6. "Mean Business" (Coverdale, Micky Moody, Marsden, Neil Murray, Jon Lord, Dave Dowle) – 3:49
7. "Love Hunter" (Coverdale, Moody, Marsden) – 5:38
8. "Outlaw" (Coverdale, Marsden, Lord) – 4:04
9. "Rock 'n' Roll Women" (Coverdale, Moody) – 4:44
10. "We Wish You Well" (Coverdale) – 1:39

=== Bonus tracks ===
Lovehunter was remastered and reissued in 2006 with several bonus tracks taken from Andy Peebles BBC Radio 1 sessions recorded 29 March 1979 (tracks originally from the band's debut album Trouble).

11. "Belgian Tom's Hat Trick" (Moody) – 3:40
12. "Love to Keep You Warm" (Coverdale) – 3:30
13. "Ain't No Love in the Heart of the City" (Michael Price, Dan Walsh) – 4:54
14. "Trouble" (Coverdale, Marsden) – 4:30

== Personnel ==
Whitesnake

- David Coverdale – lead vocals (all but track 8), backing vocals
- Micky Moody – slide guitar, guitars, backing vocals
- Bernie Marsden – guitars, backing vocals, lead vocals on track 8
- Neil Murray – bass
- Dave Dowle – drums
- Jon Lord – keyboards

Production

- Martin Birch – producer, engineer, mixing at Central Recorders Studio, London
- Chris Achilleos – LP artwork

== Charts ==
Chart (1979)	Peak position
UK Albums (Official Charts)	29

Chart (2006)	Peak position
Japanese Albums (Oricon)	194
