= Snakebite (EP) =

- Original 4 track EP sleeve

EP by Whitesnake
- Released: 2 June 1978
- Recorded: 7–13 April 1978
- Studio: AIR and Central Recorders, London, UK
- Genre: Hard rock, blues rock
- Length: 16:01
- Label: United Artists (North America); EMI International (Rest of the world)
- Producer: 1–4 by Martin Birch, 5–8 by Roger Glover

Whitesnake chronology
Northwinds (1978)	Snakebite (1978)	Trouble (1978)

LP cover

Professional ratings
Review scores
Source	Rating
AllMusic	2/5 stars
Collector's Guide to Heavy Metal	5/10
MusicHound Rock	2.5/5 stars

Snakebite is the first official release by the British rock band Whitesnake. The original EP initially featured only four tracks and was released primarily in the UK in June 1978.

Snakebite was repackaged in September 1978 as an album for markets outside the UK, containing four extra studio tracks taken from David Coverdale's second solo album Northwinds. The EP sleeve is entitled David Coverdale's Whitesnake and features photographs of the live band in concert. All tracks from the original EP also were used as bonus tracks on the 2006 remaster of Whitesnake's debut studio album Trouble.

== Background and writing ==
Shortly after producing and then touring in support of Northwinds, Coverdale found that his new band was already producing and testing new material. Thus they returned to the studio to capture this newfound energy.

The resulting mini-album (Snakebite EP) features the cover song "Ain't No Love in the Heart of the City", originally performed by Bobby Bland. Although it is now considered a classic Whitesnake song, according to Coverdale it wasn't planned that way: "Originally I had no plans to actually record 'Ain’t No Love in the Heart of the City'… if you can you believe it… a song that connects so deeply with so many that I still play it today, 25 years later."

Some of the songs from this album would be captured later in 1978 and released on the 1980 Live...In the Heart of the City live album.

== Track listing ==
=== Side A ===
1. "Bloody Mary" (David Coverdale) – 3:16
2. "Steal Away" (Coverdale, Micky Moody, Bernie Marsden, Neil Murray, Peter Solley, Dave Dowle) – 4:15

=== Side B ===
1. "Ain't No Love in the Heart of the City" (Michael Price, Dan Walsh) – 5:05
2. "Come On" (Coverdale, Marsden) – 3:25

=== David Coverdale's Whitesnake – Snakebite ===
1. "Come On" (Coverdale, Marsden) – 3:31
2. "Bloody Mary" (Coverdale) – 3:18
3. "Ain't No Love in the Heart of the City" (Price, Walsh) – 5:07
4. "Steal Away" (Coverdale, Moody, Marsden, Murray, Solley, Dowle) – 4:16
5. "Keep on Giving Me Love" (Coverdale, Moody) – 5:13
6. "Queen of Hearts" (Coverdale, Moody) – 5:15
7. "Only My Soul" (Coverdale) – 4:33
8. "Breakdown" (Coverdale, Moody) – 5:12
- Tracks 1–4 are from the original EP, recorded 7–13 April 1978 at Central Recorders, London.
- Tracks 5–8 are from the Northwinds album, recorded 10–19 April 1977 at AIR Studios, London.

== Personnel ==
=== Tracks 1–4 ===
- David Coverdale – lead vocals
- Micky Moody – guitar, backing vocals
- Bernie Marsden – guitar, backing vocals
- Neil Murray – bass guitar
- Dave Dowle – drums
- Pete Solley – keyboards

=== Tracks 5–8 ===
- David Coverdale – lead vocals
- Micky Moody – guitar, backing vocals (track 6)
- Tim Hinkley – piano (tracks 5, 6), keyboards (track 7), organ (track 8)
- Alan Spenner – bass
- Tony Newman – drums
- Lee Brilleaux – harmonica (track 5)
- Roger Glover – clavinet (track 5), cowbell (track 5), Arp 2600 (track 7)
- Graham Preskett – violin (tracks 7, 8)

== Charts ==
Chart (1978)	Peak position
UK Albums Chart	61
