= Ain't No Love in the Heart of the City =

1974 song by Michael Price and Dan Walsh

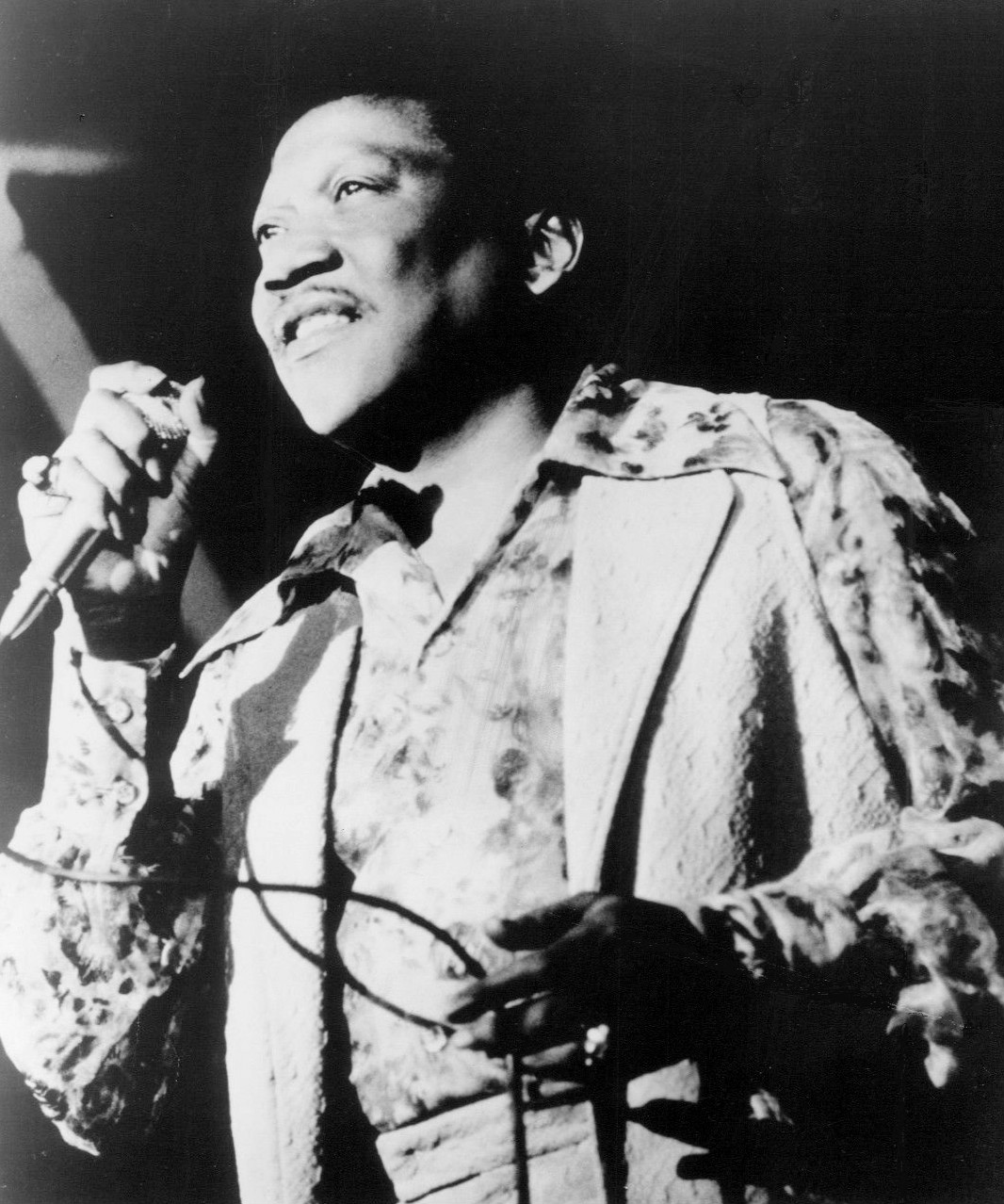
Bobby Bland in 1974

"Ain't No Love in the Heart of the City" is a 1974 R&B song written by Michael Price and Dan Walsh, and first recorded by Bobby "Blue" Bland for his Dreamer album on the ABC Dunhill label.

== Background ==
While it is ostensibly a love song, some critics and fans have also heard it as a lament on urban poverty and hopelessness, as well as a lament upon the struggle to achieve one's goals in life in the absence of external support. "Ain't No Love in the Heart of the City" remains a cult favorite, and is considered a classic.

== Chart performance ==
In the US, Bland scored a top ten hit on the Hot Soul Singles chart, where it peaked at number 9, as well as peaking at number 91 on the Hot 100.

== Cover versions and samples ==
"Ain't No Love in the Heart of the City"

Single by Whitesnake

from the album Snakebite and Live...in the Heart of the City
- B-side: "Bloody Mary" "Take Me with You" (live)
- Released: 2 June 1978 (EP); 3 November 1980 (live single)
- Recorded: April 1978; 23 November 1978 (live)
- Genre: Hard rock, blues rock
- Length: 5:07; 8:18 (live)
- Label: United Artists, Geffen, EMI (studio); Liberty, Sunburst (live)
- Songwriters: Michael Price; Dan Walsh
- Producer: Martin Birch(both versions)

Whitesnake singles chronology
"Ain't No Love in the Heart of the City" (1978)	"Lie Down (A Modern Love Song)" (1978)

Music video
- "Ain't No Love in the Heart of the City" on YouTube

It is known through several cover versions and samples:

- A well-known cover of the song is by the hard rock band Whitesnake, who included it on their 1978 debut EP, Snakebite, and again as a live recording on Live...in the Heart of the City (1980). The cover was the band's first single, and it became a staple of their live set.
- For his 2001 album The Blueprint, rapper Jay-Z recorded the song "Heart of the City (Ain't No Love)", a Kanye West-produced track built around a sample of Bobby Bland's chartmaking rendition.

Other notable cover versions have been recorded by:

- Bobby Bazini - on his sophomore album, Where I Belong (folk/soul, 2014)
- The cover version by reggae singer Al Brown even changes most of the lyrics to magnify the emphasis of the lyrics.
- Barrett Strong (R&B, 1976)
- Café Jacques - on the album Round the Back' (rock, 1977)
- Grady Tate (jazz, 1977)
- Long John Baldry (blues, 1977)
- Kate Taylor (rock, 1979)
- Crystal Gayle (country, 1980)
- Herman Brood (rock, Bühnensucht, live recording, 1985)
- Chris Farlowe (R&B, 1985)
- Walter "Wolfman" Washington (New Orleans R&B, on 1991 album, Sada)
- The Good Earth (pop/rock, 1994)
- Mick Abrahams (rock, 1996)
- Jørn Lande (hard rock, The Snakes Live in Europe, 1998)
- Paul Weller (rock, 1998)
- Willie Clayton (R&B, 1998, as "Heart of the City")
- Jay Z (on the album The Blueprint, as "Heart of City (Ain't No Love)", 2001)
- Mary Coughlan (jazz, 2002)
- Joey Tempest (rock/metal, 2003)
- Maggie Bell (rock, 2004, live recording)
- Vaya Con Dios (rock, 2004)
- YTcracker (From the STC Is the Greatest album, track number 16, "Spamcity", 2004)
- Joe Budden (Rap, 2007)
- Paul Carrack (blue-eyed soul, pop/rock, 2008)
- Allman Brothers Band (blues, 2009 live recording on Beacon Box Set)
- Nicky Moore (blues rock, 2009)
- GRiZ (sampled on the song "Where's The Love" on the album Mad Liberation, 2012)
- Lukas Graham (blue-eyed soul, 2012 as "Daddy, Now That You're Gone (Ain't No Love)")
- Dana Fuchs (On album Broken Down, acoustic sessions 2015)
- Supersonic Blues Machine (On the album West of Flushing South of Frisco, 2016)
- Zeshan B (On album, Vetted, 2017)
- Black Pumas (On the album Black Pumas Deluxe Edition Exclusive 2LP+7", released 2020)
- Gov't Mule (on the album Heavy Load Blues, released 2021)
- Horace Andy (on album Midnight Scorchers, released 2022)

== Popular culture ==
- Jay-Z's version of the song was used in the trailer for the 2007 film American Gangster, in a 2011 Chrysler commercial, as the theme song for the CBS series NYC 22 and a Crown Royal commercial in 2013.
- Kanye West sampled drums from the song in Jesus Walks, from the album The College Dropout (2004).
- The song is featured in the 2009 video game DJ Hero, in "mashed-up" form.
- The song is played over the opening credits of the 2019 Norwegian time-travel fantasy comedy-drama television series, Beforeigners.
- The song is featured on the soundtracks to the 2009 film Fighting, the 2011 crime drama The Lincoln Lawyer and is also featured in the 2017 movie The Hitman's Bodyguard.
- The song is featured in episode 5 of Sex Education.
- The song is also featured in season five of the Netflix series, Last Chance U (2020), which focuses on the lives of Laney College football players and staff within Oakland, California.
- DJ Khaled samples the song in the intro track "THANKFUL", on the album Khaled Khaled (2021).
- In Spider-Man: Across the Spider-Verse (2023), Aaron Davis of Earth-42 plays a Bobby Bland LP with this song on it.
- The original version of the song is featured in the South Korean crime drama, The Frog (2024).

== Charts ==
1980-1981 chart performance for "Ain't No Love in the Heart of the City"
Chart (1980)	Peak position
UK Singles (OCC)	51

Chart (1981)	Peak position
US Billboard Bubbling Under Hot 100	9
US Billboard Hot 100	109
