= Come an' Get It =

Studio album by Whitesnake
- Released: 6 April 1981
- Recorded: July – September 1980, January 1981
- Studio: Startling Studios, Tittenhurst Park, Ascot, England
- Genre: Hard rock; blues rock
- Length: 40:24
- Label: Mirage/Atlantic (North America); Polydor (Japan); Liberty (Rest of the world)
- Producer: Martin Birch

Whitesnake chronology
Live...in the Heart of the City (1980)	Come an' Get It (1981)	Saints & Sinners (1982)

Singles from Come an' Get It
- 1. "Don't Break My Heart Again" Released: 20 March 1981; 2. "Would I Lie to You" Released: 22 May 1981

Alternative cover
- 2007 EMI reissued cover

Professional ratings
Review scores
Source	Rating
AllMusic	2.5/5 stars
Collector's Guide to Heavy Metal	7/10

Come an' Get It is the fourth studio album by the British rock band Whitesnake, released in 1981. It was, at the time, Whitesnake's highest-charting release in the UK, hitting No. 2 and being kept off the top spot by Adam and the Ants' Kings of the Wild Frontier.

"Don't Break My Heart Again" and "Would I Lie to You" were released as singles, the former making the UK Top 20.

The album received a CD release on 8 April 1988 in the UK. EMI remastered the album in 2007, adding six bonus tracks, mainly rough mixes.

== Cover art ==
Come an' Get It's cover art was designed and created by British artist Malcolm Horton. Horton had been contacted by an old friend John Ward, who was at the time road manager for Whitesnake. He explained that the band did not like any of the ideas for the album cover their record label EMI had come up with, so he suggested getting Horton involved. The final artwork shows a white snake trapped inside a glass apple on the front cover, while on the reverse, the apple is shattered and the snake has escaped, representing the power of seduction/temptation becoming too strong. The snake's open mouth shows its tongue, which is painted to look like a vulva. Horton has addressed the album's "explicit" cover, saying:

One thing I always get asked about is the snake's mouth. At the time it just felt right to give it, how should I say, “a sexual element”. I felt some apprehension at first to how it would be received and if it would be acceptable. I felt that in the context of all the elements “Come An' Get It," apple, temptation, seduction it all seemed to work. Thankfully it worked and gave the piece an edge. The American market though thought differently and apparently, the mouth was airbrushed out!!

However, it did not stir as much controversy as the infamous cover of the band's second album, Lovehunter (1979). The 2007 EMI reissue redesigned the tongue to more closely resemble a regular snake's tongue.

== Commercial performance ==
At its debut, Come an' Get It debuted at No. 2 in the UK chart, the highest debut in the band's discography ever in their native country, but was prevented from the top spot over Adam and the Ants' Kings of the Wild Frontier. It eventually stayed 23 weeks up in the charts. The album charted on 7 countries, with Finland charting on No. 3, Germany on No. 20, Japan on No. 41, Norway on No. 26, and Sweden on No. 24. In the US, it only debuted on the Billboard 200 chart at No. 151 and kept showing for 6 weeks, unlike the moderate successes of their previous album 'Ready an' Willing' that formerly stayed for a total of 16 weeks at that time in 1980.

The album was certified by BPI within silver status on 27 April 1981, then gold on 16 September 1981, eventually reaching platinum (300,000 copies). The album also received a gold award by RIAJ in 1981.

== Touring ==
The band first embarked on a promotional supporting tour on 14 April 1981. The act headlined Billy Squier's 1981 "Don't Say No" album at that time. They were then joined by headlining British heavy metal band Judas Priest, "World Wide Blitz Tour" alongside other acts with Iron Maiden and Foghat in July through August, respectively. The tour also included their very first appearance in Monsters of Rock performance at Castle Donington on 22 August 1981 headlined by AC/DC. The tour would come to an end on 12 December 1981 at Stadthalle Freiburg located at Freiburg im Breisgau, Germany, lasting for an approximate five months.

== Track listing ==
Side one
No.	Title	Writer(s)	Length
1.	"Come an' Get It"	David Coverdale	3:59
2.	"Hot Stuff"	Coverdale, Micky Moody	3:22
3.	"Don't Break My Heart Again"	Coverdale	4:03
4.	"Lonely Days, Lonely Nights"	Coverdale	4:16
5.	"Wine, Women an' Song"	Coverdale, Moody, Bernie Marsden, Neil Murray, Jon Lord, Ian Paice	3:45

Side two
No.	Title	Writer(s)	Length
6.	"Child of Babylon"	Coverdale, Marsden	4:48
7.	"Would I Lie to You"	Coverdale, Moody, Marsden	4:29
8.	"Girl"	Coverdale, Marsden, Murray	3:55
9.	"Hit an' Run"	Coverdale, Moody, Marsden	3:23
10.	"Till the Day I Die"	Coverdale	4:23

2007 remastered bonus tracks
No.	Title	Writer(s)	Length
11.	"Child of Babylon" (Alternate rough mix)	Coverdale, Marsden	4:28
12.	"Girl" (Alternate version/rough mix)	Coverdale, Marsden, Murray	4:07
13.	"Come an' Get It" (Rough mix)	Coverdale	3:59
14.	"Lonely Days, Lonely Nights" (Alternate version/rough mix)	Coverdale	4:13
15.	"Till the Day I Die" (Rough mix)	Coverdale	4:44
16.	"Hit an' Run" (Backing track)	Coverdale, Moody, Marsden	3:18

== Personnel ==
Credits are adapted from the album's liner notes.

Whitesnake

- David Coverdale – vocals
- Bernie Marsden – guitar, backing vocals, voice box (Hit an' Run), acoustic guitar (Till the Day I Die)
- Micky Moody – guitar, backing vocals
- Neil Murray – bass guitar
- Ian Paice – drums
- Jon Lord – keyboards

Technical

- Martin "Sir Larry" Birch – producer, engineer, mixing
- Greg Fulginiti – remastering (at Artisan Sound Recorders) (1987 Geffen Records reissue)

Design

- Malcolm "Magnet" Horton – illustration, album art, cover concept development, artwork co-ordination
- Fin Costello – photography

Reissue

- David Coverdale & Michael McIntyre – producer
- Jo Brooks, Libby Jones, & Nigel Reeve – project and A&R co-ordination (in retrospect for EMI)
- Koh Hasebe & Paul Cox – additional photos
- Geoff Barton – sleeve notes
- Hugh Gilmour – artwork remastering
- Peter Mew – remastering (at Abbey Road Studios in London)

== Charts ==
Chart (1981)	Peak position
Finnish Albums (The Official Finnish Charts)	3
German Albums (Offizielle Top 100)	20
Japanese Albums (Oricon)	41
Norwegian Albums (VG-lista)	26
Swedish Albums (Sverigetopplistan)	24
UK Albums (OCC)	2
US Billboard 200	151

Chart (2007)	Peak position
Japanese Albums (Oricon)	143

== Certifications ==
Region	Certification	Certified units/sales
Japan (RIAJ)	Gold	100,000^{^}
United Kingdom (BPI)	Gold	100,000^{^}
Yugoslavia	Silver	
^{^} Shipments figures based on certification alone.
