= Dave Dowle =

English drummer

David 'Duck' Dowle is an English drummer who has played with Brian Auger's Oblivion Express, Streetwalkers, Whitesnake, Runner, Midnight Flyer, and Bernie Marsden.

== Discography ==
=== With Brian Auger's Oblivion Express ===
- Reinforcements (1975)

=== With Streetwalkers ===
- Vicious But Fair (1977)

=== With Whitesnake ===
- Snakebite (1978)
- Trouble (1978)
- Lovehunter (1979)
- Live at Hammersmith (1980)

=== With Runner ===
- Runner (1979)

=== With Mark Zed ===
- My Calculator's Right (1980)

=== With Midnight Flyer ===
- Midnight Flyer (1981)
- Rock 'n' Roll Party (1981)
