= Bernie Marsden =

British guitarist (1951–2023)

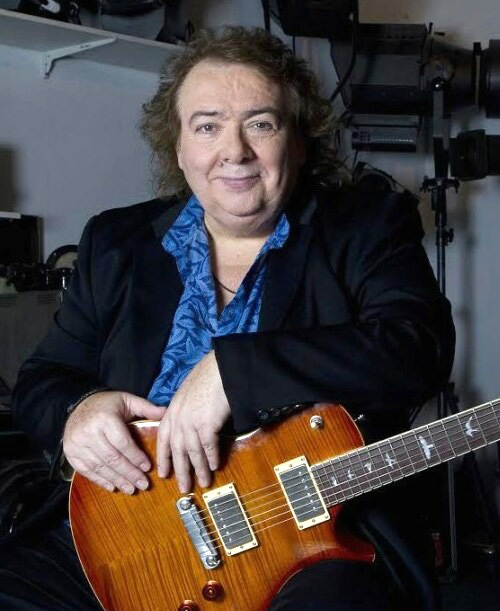
- Marsden in 2014

Background information
- Born: Bernard John Marsden; 7 May 1951; Buckingham, Buckinghamshire, England
- Died: 24 August 2023 (aged 72) England
- Genres: Rock; blues-rock; blues; heavy metal
- Occupations: Musician; songwriter; producer
- Instruments: Guitar
- Years active: 1968–2023
- Labels: RAK; Chrysalis; EMI; Parlophone; Warner Bros.; United Artists; Capitol; SPV; Mascot; Provogue; Little House; Conquest
- Formerly of: UFO, Wild Turkey, Cozy Powell's Hammer, Babe Ruth, Paice Ashton Lord, Whitesnake, Jon Lord, Ian Gillan, Alaska, Moody Marsden Band, The Company of Snakes, Elkie Brooks, Joe Bonamassa, Warren Haynes, Jack Bruce, Ginger Baker, Living Colour.
- Website: berniemarsden.com

Bernard John Marsden (7 May 1951 – 24 August 2023) was an English rock and blues guitarist. He is primarily known for his work with Whitesnake, having written or co-written with David Coverdale many of the group's hit songs, such as "Fool for Your Loving", "Walking in the Shadow of the Blues", "Ready an' Willing", "Lovehunter", "Trouble", and "Here I Go Again".

== Career ==
=== Early career ===
After playing with local Buckingham-based groups, including Clockwork Mousetrap (previously The Daystroms), Marsden formed Skinny Cat at the age of 17.

Marsden got his first professional gig with UFO in 1972. He next played with Glenn Cornick's Wild Turkey in 1973, before joining drummer Cozy Powell's band, Cozy Powell's Hammer. He then joined Babe Ruth in 1975 and played on two Capitol Records releases, Stealin' Home (1975) and Kid's Stuff (1976). During his time with Babe Ruth, Cozy Powell recommended him to Jon Lord, who was forming a post Deep Purple band with Ian Paice, Paice Ashton Lord, in 1976, with Tony Ashton.

During his time recording the Malice in Wonderland album with Paice Ashton Lord, Marsden worked alongside saxophonist Howie Casey, who recommended he join Paul McCartney's Wings, but the position never materialised, as Whitesnake was being formed at the same time.

=== Paice Ashton Lord ===
Paice Ashton Lord was the band formed by Jon Lord and Ian Paice after the demise of Deep Purple. Long-time associate and keyboard player Tony Ashton made up the third part. Cozy Powell recommended Marsden, who auditioned alongside bassist Paul Martinez. There was much anticipation for the band, but after one album and only five gigs, the band folded during sessions for a second album in Munich, a momentous period because it was in Munich that Marsden met David Coverdale for the first time.

=== Whitesnake ===
After Paice Ashton Lord folded in 1978, Marsden formed a new band with former Deep Purple vocalist David Coverdale and guitarist Micky Moody. The band started as David Coverdale's White Snake, which then became Whitesnake. Marsden played on the first EP, first five albums and a live album: Snakebite (1978), Trouble (1978), Lovehunter (1979), Ready an' Willing (1980), Live... in the Heart of the City (1980), Come an' Get It (1981) and Saints & Sinners (1982), contributing many of the songs with David Coverdale and sometimes Moody. Marsden and Coverdale went on to create Whitesnake's anthem "Here I Go Again" in 1982.

=== Post-Whitesnake bands ===
Following his departure from Whitesnake, Marsden formed a short-lived band called Bernie Marsden's SOS. Not long after, Bernie Marsden formed the band Alaska with Robert Hawthorne on vocals and Richard Bailey on keyboards. Alaska released two melodic rock albums in two years, Heart of the Storm (1984) and The Pack (1985), before splitting. In 1986, he put together MGM with former Whitesnake members Neil Murray and his replacement guitarist in Whitesnake, Mel Galley. The band, briefly, also included former Toto vocalist, Bobby Kimball. Recordings were made but remain unreleased.

In 1989, Marsden reunited with Whitesnake guitarist Moody to form The Moody Marsden band, recording an acoustic live album in Norway called Live In Hell and an electric live album recorded in England, Never Turn Our Back on the Blues, that featured Zak Starkey on drums. Marsden & Moody toured throughout Europe and recorded one studio album called Real Faith in 1994. They later formed a new band called "The Snakes" with Norwegian vocalist Jørn Lande focused on only playing songs from their time in Whitesnake, releasing a studio album (Once Bitten) and a live record (Live in Europe), both in 1998. Following the departure of Lande, bassist Sid Ringsby and drummer Willy Bendiksen, the band shifted its name to The Company Of Snakes, welcoming keyboardist Don Airey, bassist Neil Murray, drummer John Lingwood and former Bad Company vocalist Robert Hart. As it turned out, the name was a little misleading as though Robert Hart recorded the double live album Here They Go Again (2002), his vocals were replaced by those of Stefan Berggren, and a year later the Berggren line up produced a single studio album Burst The Bubble. Eventually the band changed its name once again to "M3". This revamped line up included Marsden, Moody, Murray, Berggren, the drummer Jimmy Copley and keyboard player Mark Stanway. M3 produced a triple-CD DVD called Rough 'n' Ready which again features the songs from their Whitesnake's legacy, now with former Rainbow member Doogie White as special guest sharing the vocal duties, and another live album, Classic Snake Live Vol I, in 2006 with former Black Sabbath member Tony Martin replacing Berggren and White. The band ended in the same year with Marsden, Moody and Murray going their separate ways.

=== Solo career ===
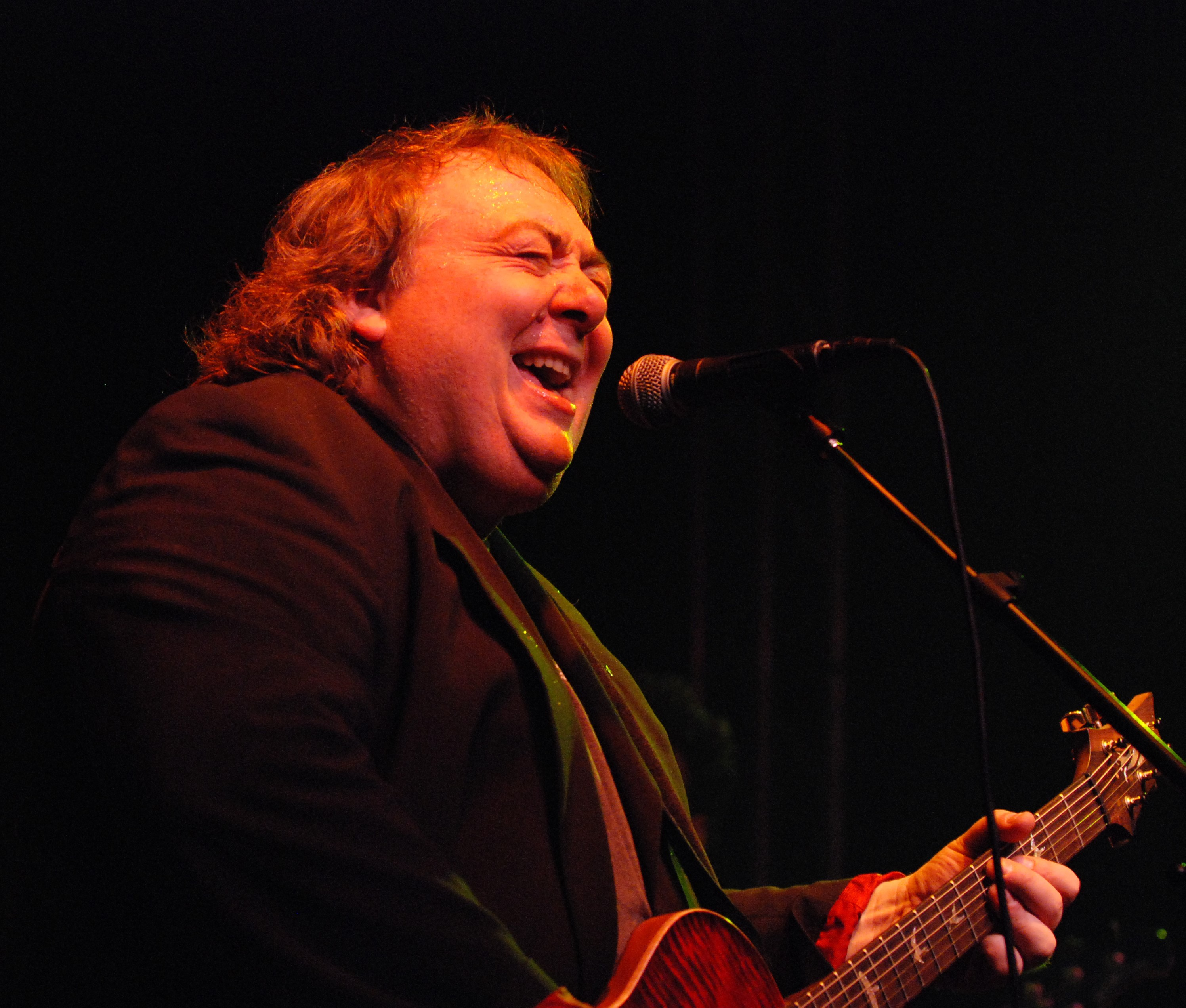
Marsden performing in 2007

Marsden released two solo albums during his time in Whitesnake. First released in Japan on the Japanese label Trash/Trio in 1979, And About Time Too, became the number one import into the UK. EMI Records soon picked up the rights to the album and released it in Europe shortly before the release of Marsden's second solo album, Look At Me Now, in 1981. Both of these LPs were on the Parlophone label; at the time only Marsden and The Beatles were on the label. His BBC Friday Rock Show solo sessions were released on CD; these featured David Coverdale and Toto drummer Simon Phillips. No more solo albums appeared until the release of his Green and Blues in 1994. This album is his tribute to guitarists in the John Mayall & the Bluesbreakers allowing him to thank Eric Clapton, Peter Green, and Mick Taylor, but most of all John Mayall.

Marsden recorded two soundtrack CDs; his music has featured in many US TV shows.

Marsden produced his own documentary blues-based DVD, filmed in Mississippi. Concentrating on the Clarksdale area, it features some wonderful stories and playing, especially with James 'Super Chikan' Johnson, Morgan Freeman appears, dancing in the Ground Zero Club in Clarksdale as Marsden plays with his band. His continuing fascination with blues music led to him producing USA artist Larry Johnson's Blues From Harlem CD, and forming close relationships with Honey Boy Edwards, John Jackson and Louisiana Red, playing with all of them as well.

Into the 2000s, he produced his Big Boy Blue double-CD, Stacks, featuring Jimmy Copley, Big Boy Blue Live, and Bernie Plays Rory, a double CD of Rory Gallagher's material. A live acoustic recording, Going To My Hometown, was recorded at The Radcliffe Centre in Buckingham. Castle Communications released a definitive compilation double CD called Blues and Scales which features songs from almost all the bands of his career.

Marsden played guitar with Elkie Brooks, a singer he long admired; with The Diesel Band with John Coghlan; worked at The National Theatre in two Shakespeare productions with Sir Nicholas Hytner; wrote for Joe Bonamassa; and played with Warren Haynes of the Allman Brothers Band; joining the band on stage at the Beacon Theatre in New York. A personal highlight of his long career was playing guitar in the Ringo Starr Band; with shows in Monaco and in the UK.

In 2014, Marsden was signed to the Dutch record label Mascot Provogue and released Shine. The album featured David Coverdale singing the Whitesnake classic "Trouble", Joe Bonamassa on guitar on the title track "Shine", Don Airey on keyboards and both Ian Paice and Jimmy Copley on drums.

Marsden released his autobiography Where's My Guitar in 2017. The book was updated and reissued by HarperCollins in November 2019.

In 2021, Bernie Marsden teamed up with Conquest Music to release his next solo album, Kings, a tribute to Albert King, Freddie King and B.B. King. Kings reached number 18 in the UK Albums Chart and was followed quickly by the release of Chess, inspired by the Chicago based Chess label.

== Later years and death ==
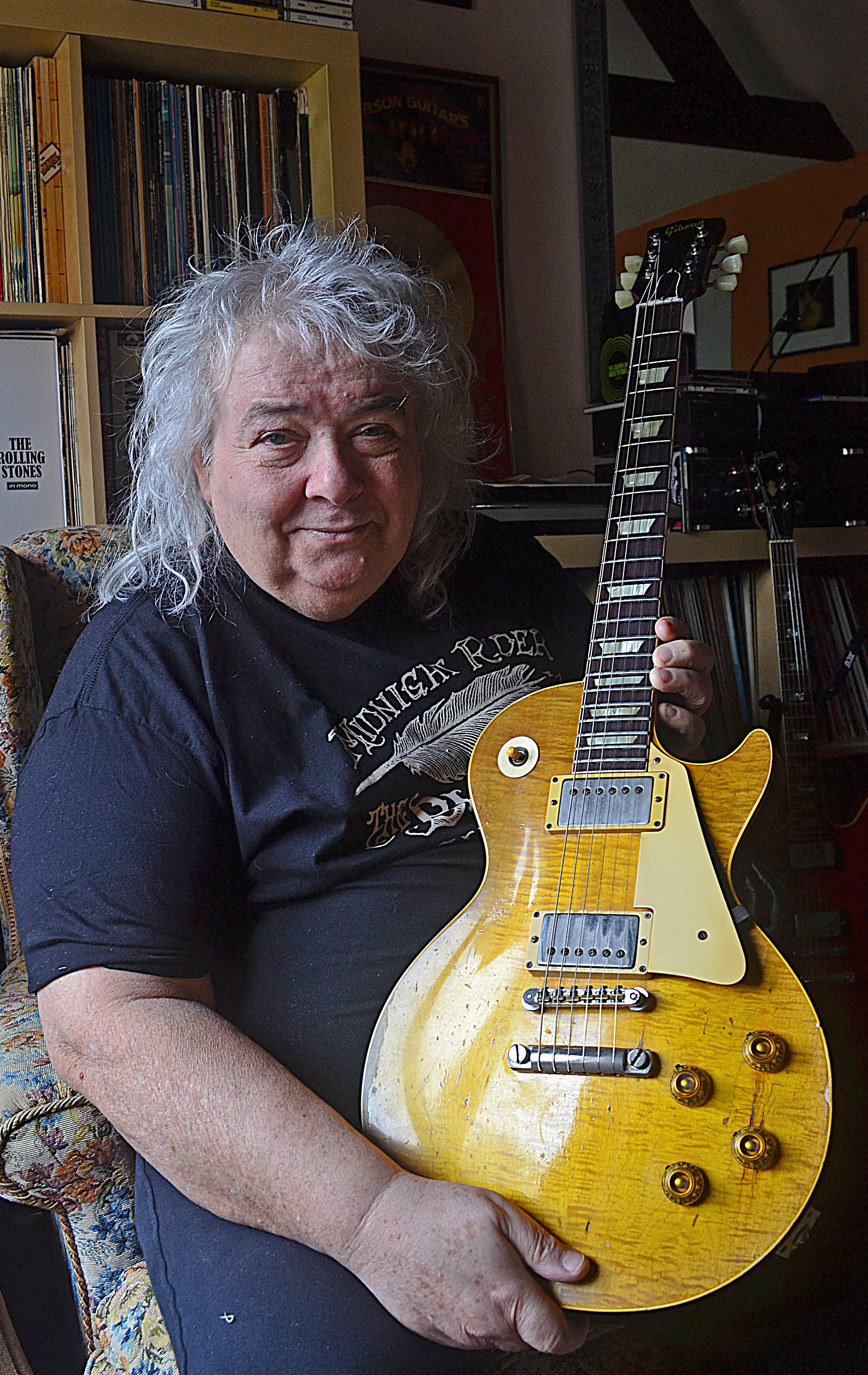
Bernie and "The Beast" in 2022

His inaugural Guitar Mojo Experience was held at Arts at Stowe School in Buckinghamshire in 2018 and 2019. A third Mojo was scheduled for July 2020.

In 2015, the University of Buckingham granted Bernie Marsden an honorary Master of Arts degree.

In 2021, Marsden was crowned The Lord of The Blues at the HRH Awards.

Marsden continued to play solo shows, mainly festivals in Europe and the UK, joining Joe Bonamassa's Blues Cruises, and also took a show on the road playing the Whitesnake album Ready an' Willing in its entirety in the autumn of 2019.

On the evening of 24 August 2023, Marsden died after an illness with his wife and two daughters at his side. He was 72. Marsden's former bandmate, David Coverdale, expressed his condolences on his Twitter (X) account.

== Guitar related ==
PRS Guitars released a Bernie Marsden Signature Edition guitar, and Gibson Guitars made a limited edition number of his Gibson Les Paul guitar known as "The Beast". His second book, released in 2018, is Tales of Tone and Volume and is a large tome featuring his guitar collection. Marsden contributed a column to Guitarist magazine in 2018–19.

== Discography ==
With UFO

- 1973 The Dave Edmunds Rockfield Demos

With Cozy Powell's Hammer

- 1974 Na Na Na/ Mistral (RAK single) + BBC Radio Recordings

With Wild Turkey

- 1974 BBC Radio Sessions
- 2002 Rarest Turkey Audio Archive label
- 2003 Rare Turkey BBC and rarities Audio Archive

With Babe Ruth

- 1975 – Stealin' Home
- 1976 – Kid's Stuff

With Paice Ashton Lord

- 1977 – Malice in Wonderland
- 1993 – BBC Radio 1 Live in Concert '77
- 2007 – Live in London '77 (DVD)

With Whitesnake

- 1978 – Snakebite
- 1978 – Trouble
- 1979 – Lovehunter
- 1980 – Ready an' Willing
- 1980 – Live...in the Heart of the City
- 1981 – Come an' Get It
- 1982 – Saints & Sinners

With Alaska

- 1984 – Heart of the Storm (as Bernie Marsden's Alaska)
- 1985 – The Pack
- 1986 – Alive (VHS, DVD – 2005)
- 2002 – Live Baked Alaska
- 2003 – Anthology 1

With the Moody Marsden Band

- 1992 – Never Turn Our Back on the Blues
- 1994 – Live in Hell – Unplugged
- 1994 – The Time Is Right for Live (the two above albums released as one)
- 1994 – Real Faith

With the Snakes / The Company of Snakes

- 1998 – Once Bitten (Japan only)
- 1998 – Live in Europe
- 2001 – Here They Go Again
- 2002 – Burst the Bubble

with M3

- 2005 – Classic Snake Live
- 2005/2007 – Rough an' Ready (CD/DVD)
- 2007 – Rough An' Ready CD Castle

With the Little House Band

- 2000 Christmas 2000 (COS line up as The Little House Band) Unreleased Promo, Cover Versions

With The Majesticaires

- 2001 Solid Rock (COS line up as the Majesticaires) Unreleased Promo, Cover Versions

Solo recordings

- 1979 – And About Time Too! (reissue: 2000)
- 1981 – Look at Me Now (reissue: 2000)
- 1992 – The Friday Rock Show Sessions '81
- 1995 – Tribute to Peter Green: Green and Blues
- 2002 – Blues Rock (Bad Ass'd Boogie Driven Hot Licks) Industry Only Sampler
- 2003 – Big Boy Blue (Advance Edition)
- 2003 – Big Boy Blue (2CD Edition)
- 2005 – Live at the Granary
- 2005 – Stacks
- 2006 – Blues 'n' Scales: A Snakeman's Odyssey 1970–2004 (compilation)
- 2007 – Big Boy Blue... Live (live album)
- 2009 – Bernie Plays Rory
- 2009 – Going to My Hometown (live acoustic album)
- 2010 – Remix of Bernie plays Rory
- 2011 – Ballyshannon Blues
- 2012 – Very Local Boy (compilation)
- 2013 – Jam with Bernie (Guitar Help)
- 2014 – Shine
- 2015 – The Rory Gallagher Sessions 2 CD
- 2017 – Tales of Tone and Volume CD (Only with book)
- 2021 – Kings (Conquest Music)
- 2021 – Chess (Conquest Music)
- 2022 – Trios (Conquest Music)
- 2023 – Working Man (Conquest Music)
- 2025 – Icons (Conquest Music)

Other recordings

- 1971 Speedy Keene Island LP
- 1973 You & Me Chrysalis LP (Chick Churchill)
- 1973 Matthew Fisher RCA LP
- 1974 Jumblequeen Chrysalis LP (Bridget St John)
- 1979 Over the Top (Cozy Powell)
- 1980 Why (K2)
- 1981 Tilt (Cozy Powell)
- 1982 Before I Forget (Jon Lord)
- 1982 Reading Rock '82 (VA)
- 1988 Guitar Speak 2 (VA)
- 1988 "South Africa" (Ian Gillan, songwriter)
- 1990 Perfect Crime (Blonde on Blonde, as producer only)
- 1991 Forcefield IV: Let the Wild Run Free (Forcefield)
- 1992 Instrumentals (Forcefield)
- 1994 Tellin' Stories (Walter Trout Band)
- 1994 Line Up (Borderline)
- 1995 Frankie – Soundtrack
- 1998 Still Crazy – Soundtrack
- 2000 Snakebites – The Music of Whitesnake (Tribute)
- 2000 Popmodel (Mama's Jasje)
- 2002 Blues for Harlem (Larry Johnson)
- 2002 I Eat Them for Breakfast (Micky Moody)
- 2003 Freak Out! (Chris Catena)
- 2007 Booze, Brawds and Rockin' Hard (Chris Catena)
- 2007 Human Spirit (Gary Fletcher)
- 2007 Ian Paice and Friends Live in Reading 2006 (DVD)
- 2007 Little Hard Blues (Andrea Ranfagni, "Everybody Knows", "May Day", "New Baby", "Easy Woman")
- 2008 The Original – The Audiolab Sessions 2002 (Les Castle)
- 2008 Slap My Hand (Jimmy Copley)
- 2009 Endangered Species – Live at Abbey Road 2000 (CD/DVD, Tony Ashton & Friends)
- 2011 All Out (Don Airey)
- 2014 Where Blues Meets Rock ("Linin'" Track)
- 2014 Silver Rails (Jack Bruce)
- 2014 Celebrating Jon Lord (VA)
- 2016 Cream Revisited (VA) Audio and DVD

== Film and television appearances ==
- 1989 Runaway Dreams (musical director)
- 1989 The Paradise Club BBC Television
- 1995 Rock Family Trees (interviewee)
- 1995 Frankie – Liebe, Laster, Rock 'n' Roll (German youth series as piano player Big Ed)
- 1998 Still Crazy (performer, song "A Woman Like That")
- 2006 Heavy Metal – Louder Than Life (interviewee)
- 2013 Dance with the Devil: The Cozy Powell Story (interviewee)
- 2013 A Day in the Delta (host)
- 2014 Play It Loud: The Story of Marshall (interviewee)
