= 30th Anniversary Collection (Whitesnake album) =

Box set by Whitesnake
- Released: 2008
- Genre: Hard rock, blues rock
- Label: EMI

Whitesnake chronology
Good to Be Bad (2008)	30th Anniversary Collection (2008)	Forevermore (2011)

Professional ratings
Review scores
Source	Rating
Metal Hammer (Germany)	6/7

The 30th Anniversary Collection is a triple CD collection released in 2008, celebrating the 30th anniversary of Whitesnake. It was released by EMI and charted at number 38 on the UK Albums Chart.

== Background ==
In 2003 the compilation album The Silver Anniversary Collection was released featuring two CDs to celebrate the band's 25th Anniversary, but this compilation celebrating the band's 30th Anniversary features as a box set compilation consisting of three CDs. Disc one is essentially the same as the compilation The Early Years, and disc two and three are "updated" versions of the two-disc compilation The Silver Anniversary Collection.

== Track listing ==
Disc one
No.	Title	Length
1.	"Walking in the Shadow of the Blues" (from Lovehunter, 1979)	4:20
2.	"Sweet Talker" (from Ready an' Willing, 1980)	3:37
3.	"Would I Lie to You" (from Come an' Get It, 1981)	4:29
4.	"Trouble" (from Trouble, 1978)	4:48
5.	"Gambler" (from Slide It In, 1984)	3:56
6.	"Love Hunter" (from Lovehunter, 1979)	5:32
7.	"Ready an' Willing" (from Ready an' Willing, 1980)	3:42
8.	"Child of Babylon" (from Come an' Get It, 1981)	4:48
9.	"Here I Go Again" (from Saints & Sinners, 1982)	4:59
10.	"Carry Your Load" (from Ready an' Willing, 1980)	4:05
11.	"Crying in the Rain" (from Saints & Sinners, 1982)	6:00
12.	"Rough an' Ready" (from Saints & Sinners, 1982)	2:57
13.	"Wine, Women an' Song" (from Come an' Get It, 1981)	3:44
14.	"Lie Down... I Think I Love You (A Modern Love Song)" (from Trouble, 1978)	3:09
15.	"Ain't No Love in the Heart of the City (live)" (from Live...in the Heart of the City, 1980)	6:13
16.	"Fool for Your Loving (live)" (from Live... in the Heart of the City, 1980)	4:32
17.	"Take Me with You (live)" (from Live... in the Heart of the City, 1980)	6:24

Disc two
No.	Title	Length
1.	"Fool for Your Loving" (from Ready an' Willing, 1980)	4:16
2.	"Don't Break My Heart Again" (from Come an' Get It, 1981)	4:02
3.	"Hit an' Run" (from Come an' Get It, 1981)	3:23
4.	"The Time Is Right for Love" (from Trouble, 1978)	3:27
5.	"Love Ain't No Stranger" (from Slide It In, 1984)	4:10
6.	"Too Many Tears" (from Restless Heart, 1997)	5:47
7.	"Pride and Joy (Coverdale-Page)" (from Coverdale Page, 1993)	3:31
8.	"Victim of Love" (from Saints & Sinners, 1982)	3:34
9.	"Judgement Day" (from Slip of the Tongue, 1989)	5:15
10.	"Is This Love" (from 1987)	4:44
11.	"Take a Look at Yourself (Coverdale-Page)" (from Coverdale Page, 1993)	5:03
12.	"Straight for the Heart" (from 1987)	3:42
13.	"Now You're Gone" (US remix)" (from Slip of the Tongue, 1989)	4:11
14.	"Looking for Love" (from 1987)	6:33
15.	"Sailing Ships (live)" (from Starkers in Tokyo, 1998)	4:09
16.	"Soldier of Fortune" (live)" (from Starkers in Tokyo, 1998)	3:35
17.	"Walking in the Shadow of the Blues (live)" (from Live... in the Heart of the City, 1980)	4:49
18.	"Ready an' Willing (live)" (from Live... in the Heart of the City, 1980)	4:45

Disc three
No.	Title	Length
1.	"Slow an' Easy" (from Slide It In, 1984)	6:07
2.	"Shake My Tree (Coverdale-Page)" (from Coverdale Page, 1993)	4:53
3.	"Guilty of Love" (from Slide It In, 1984)	3:21
4.	"The Deeper the Love" (from Slip of the Tongue, 1989)	4:21
5.	"Blindman" (from Ready an' Willing, 1980)	5:07
6.	"Love to Keep You Warm" (from Trouble, 1978)	3:45
7.	"Love Is Blind (David Coverdale)" (from Into the Light, 2000)	5:45
8.	"Ain't Gonna Cry No More" (from Ready an' Willing, 1980)	5:48
9.	"Slave (David Coverdale)" (from Into the Light, 2000)	4:54
10.	"Lonely Days, Lonely Nights" (from Come an' Get It, 1981)	4:15
11.	"Give Me All Your Love" (from 1987)	3:30
12.	"Till the Day I Die" (from Come an' Get It, 1981)	4:28
13.	"Here I Go Again '87" (from 1987)	4:33
14.	"Still of the Night" (from 1987)	6:39
15.	"If You Want Me" (from Live: In the Shadow of the Blues, 2006)	4:09
16.	"Best Years" (from Good to Be Bad, 2008)	5:16
17.	"We Wish You Well" (from Lovehunter, 1979)	1:36

== Charts ==
Chart (2008)	Position
UK Albums Chart	38
UK Rock & Metal Albums (OCC)	6
