= The Silver Anniversary Collection =

Compilation album by Whitesnake
- Released: 20 May 2003
- Recorded: 1978–1997
- Genres: Hard rock, blues rock, heavy metal
- Length: 155:52
- Label: EMI

Whitesnake chronology
20th Century Masters – The Millennium Collection: The Best of Whitesnake (2000)	The Silver Anniversary Collection (2003)	The Early Years (2004)

Professional ratings
Review scores
Source	Rating
AllMusic	4/5 stars
Noise.fi	4/5 stars
Soundi	4/5 stars

The Silver Anniversary Collection is a 2CD compilation by the British-American rock band Whitesnake, released in 2003. The album also features solo material by the bands leader/singer David Coverdale and material from his collaboration with Jimmy Page. The album is the 25th anniversary celebration for Whitesnake (hence the name "Silver").

== Release ==
A single disc version also released in 2003 was simply titled Best of Whitesnake and charted at No. 44 on the UK Albums Chart.

In 2008 a similar compilation album was released, titled The 30th Anniversary Collection, which features three discs.

== Track listing ==
Disc one
No.	Title	Writer(s)	From the album	Length
1.	"Fool for Your Loving"	David Coverdale, Bernie Marsden, Micky Moody	Ready an' Willing (1980)	4:17
2.	"Don't Break My Heart Again"	Coverdale	Come an' Get It (1981)	4:04
3.	"Hit an' Run"	Coverdale, Marsden, Moody	Come an' Get It	3:23
4.	"The Time Is Right for Love"	Coverdale, Marsden, Moody	Trouble (1978)	3:28
5.	"Love Ain't No Stranger"	Coverdale, Mel Galley	Slide It In (1984)	4:14
6.	"Too Many Tears"	Coverdale, Adrian Vandenberg	Restless Heart (1997)	5:48
7.	"Pride and Joy"	Coverdale, Jimmy Page	Coverdale•Page (1993)	3:34
8.	"Victim of Love"	Coverdale	Saints & Sinners (1982)	3:35
9.	"Judgment Day"	Coverdale, Vandenberg	Slip of the Tongue (1989)	5:14
10.	"Is This Love"	Coverdale, John Sykes	Whitesnake (1987)	4:43
11.	"Take a Look at Yourself"	Coverdale, Page	Coverdale•Page	4:40
12.	"Straight for the Heart"	Coverdale, Sykes	Whitesnake	3:38
13.	"Now You're Gone"	Coverdale, Vandenberg	Slip of the Tongue	4:11
14.	"Looking for Love"	Coverdale, Sykes	Whitesnake	6:30
15.	"Sailing Ships" (live)	Coverdale, Vandenberg	Starkers in Tokyo (1997)	4:08
16.	"Soldier of Fortune" (live)	Coverdale, Ritchie Blackmore	Starkers in Tokyo	3:31
17.	"Walking in the Shadow of the Blues" (live)	Coverdale, Marsden	Live...in the Heart of the City (1980)	4:49
18.	"Ready an' Willing" (live)	Coverdale, Moody, Neil Murray, Ian Paice, Jon Lord	Live...in the Heart of the City	4:51

Disc two
No.	Title	Writer(s)	From the album	Length
1.	"…Into the Light"	Coverdale	Into the Light (2000)	1:16
2.	"Slow an' Easy"	Coverdale, Moody	Slide It In	5:49
3.	"She Give Me…"	Coverdale	Into the Light	4:13
4.	"Shake My Tree"	Coverdale, Page	Coverdale•Page	4:53
5.	"Guilty of Love"	Coverdale	Slide It In	3:25
6.	"The Deeper the Love"	Coverdale, Vandenberg	Slip of the Tongue	4:20
7.	"Blindman"	Coverdale	Ready an’ Willing	5:08
8.	"Love to Keep You Warm"	Coverdale	Trouble	3:46
9.	"Love Is Blind"	Coverdale, Earl Slick	Into the Light	5:45
10.	"Ain't Gonna Cry No More"	Coverdale, Moody	Ready an’ Willing	5:51
11.	"Slave"	Coverdale, Slick	Into the Light	4:54
12.	"Lonely Days, Lonely Nights"	Coverdale	Come an’ Get It	3:58
13.	"Give Me All Your Love"	Coverdale, Sykes	Whitesnake	3:29
14.	"Till the Day I Die"	Coverdale	Come an’ Get It	4:29
15.	"Ain't No Love in the Heart of the City"	Dan Walsh, Michael Price	Snakebite (1978)	5:07
16.	"Here I Go Again '87"	Coverdale, Marsden	Whitesnake	4:33
17.	"Still of the Night"	Coverdale, Sykes	Whitesnake	6:38
18.	"We Wish You Well"	Coverdale	Lovehunter (1979)	1:34

== Charts ==
Chart (2004)	Peak position
Finland	26
UK Rock & Metal Albums (Official Charts)	26
