= Greatest Hits (Whitesnake album) =

Whitesnake's Greatest Hits
- European Cover

Greatest hits album by Whitesnake
- Released: 4 July 1994
- Recorded: 1983–1989
- Genre: Hard rock; glam metal; blues rock
- Length: 68:02
- Label: EMI; Geffen
- Producer: Martin Birch; Mike Stone; Keith Olsen; Mike Clink

Whitesnake chronology
Slip of the Tongue (1989)	Whitesnake's Greatest Hits (1994)	Restless Heart (1997)

Singles from Whitesnake's Greatest Hits
- 1. "Is This Love" Released: 25 July 1994
The Blues Album (2021)	Greatest Hits: Revisited, Remixed, Remastered (2022)	The Purple Album: Special Gold Edition (2023)

Alternative cover
- Reissued album cover

Whitesnake's Greatest Hits is the universally first greatest hits album by the British-American rock band Whitesnake, first released on 4 July in Europe and 19 July 1994 in the North America, by EMI Records and Geffen Records. The compilation features the group's well-known hits from a various amount of countries, predominately the success of their singles in North America, containing nine singles and two tracks from their previous recorded albums—Slide It In (1984), Whitesnake (also known as 1987), and Slip of the Tongue (1989)—as well as three tracks that were either previously unavailable in the United States or were released as B-sides.

Upon release, Whitesnake's Greatest Hits received positive reviews from music critics. It reached number four on the UK Albums Chart and was certified gold by the British Phonographic Industry (BPI). However, it had minimal success in the United States, where it reached number 161 on the US Billboard 200 chart, but was eventually certified platinum by the Recording Industry Association of America (RIAA). After the conclusion of the band's Greatest Hits tour, they were dropped by Geffen, and Whitesnake did not release another album in North America until 2008. The compilation was reissued in 2022 in its remixed form featuring a different track listing.

== Background ==
In 1990, lead singer David Coverdale put the group on a hiatus after the Slip of the Tongue tour and withdrew from the public eye to reflect on his career. Three years later, he resurfaced by forming a collaboration with Jimmy Page. The album Coverdale–Page was released in March 1993, opening at number five in the US and number four in the UK. They played six concerts in Japan. The duo ended up selling more than one million copies worldwide.

During rehearsals for the Coverdale—Page tour, Coverdale was informed by Geffen Records, the group's North American label at the time, were planning to release a greatest hits compilation, titled Whitesnake's Greatest Hits. The project initially featured recent songs that were successful in North America. Coverdale questioned the way the songs were going to be arranged. Meanwhile, the band's European label, EMI Records also planned to get hold of the upcoming title from Geffen and issue the compilation. Coverdale then envisioned a greatest hits album that would be conceived as two volumes, known as 'Volume I' and 'Volume II'—the first highlighting early blues rock, and the second containing hard rock and glam metal sound that brought them to a worldwide success, which Geffen had already assembled. The idea was done "so people would have the choice," Coverdale explained, given that Whitesnake had various successes in different regions. EMI had agreed to assemble his request but the original recordings that were meant for the 'Volume I' set could not be located at that time. He then wanted to do a set that contained Whitesnake's most successful albums ranging from 1984 to 1990, saying that he "wanted some good old Rock 'n' Roll bollocks at the bottom."

== Release and promotion ==
To promote Whitesnake's Greatest Hits, EMI planned a "heavily advertised" campaign and promotion starting off with other countries "one area at a time", involving local TV advertising, radio adverts, in-store window displays, and nationwide street poster campaign, followed by multiple publications, including Daily Mail and Daily Mirror. The goal was to keep the albums sales consistent throughout the summer, followed by "a one-week cool down period between each burst of activity." The compilation was released on 4 July 1994 and received a positive response from the public. Rod MacSween from EMI convinced Coverdale to tour as Whitesnake. Although reluctant, Coverdale agreed and decided to reform the group.

The compilation consists fourteen digitally remastered tracks — six from the Whitesnake/1987 album, three from Slide It In, and four from Slip of the Tongue — as well as a B-side, "Sweet Lady Luck", that originally appeared in "The Deeper the Love" single. Two tracks that were featured in European release on the 1987 album — "Looking for Love" and "You're Gonna Break My Heart Again" — were originally not released in North America because Geffen's A&R John Kalodner didn't want those tracks due to vinyl constraints. Upon release, track listings for European, American, and Japanese releases is universally similar but features different mixes from Slide It In across different regions — where the American remix was released in North America and Japan, while the original mix was released in Europe. Kerrang! magazine initially reported "Don't Break My Heart Again", a 1981 track from Come an' Get It, was originally slated to be featured in the compilation but was later omitted due to undisclosed reasons.

"Is This Love" was re-released as a promo in the United Kingdom on 20 June 1994, then comercally available on 25 July. It peaked at number 25 in the UK Singles Chart and spent four weeks inside that chart.

== Critical reception ==
Professional ratings
Review scores
Source	Rating
AllMusic	4.5/5 stars
Collector's Guide to Heavy Metal	7/10
MusicHound Rock	3.5/5 stars
Music Week	3/5 stars

Whitesnake's Greatest Hits received positive reviews from music critics and contemporary accolades.

== Commercial performance ==
In the band's main country, Whitesnake's Greatest Hits debuted at number four on the UK Albums Chart on 16 July 1994. This was the group's second highest charting position since their 1981 Come an' Get It album last peaked at number two. It went on to spend 12 weeks inside the chart and received a gold certification by the British Phonographic Industry (BPI). The album debuted at the top spot for two weeks on the Rock & Metal Albums chart. According to Coverdale, the album had already reached over 100,000 copies in the UK within two days after its release.

Whitesnake's Greatest Hits also was successful in multiple countries. In Japan, the album peaked at number 27 and charted for six weeks. Five years later, the Recording Industry Association of Japan (RIAJ) certified it gold for shipment of 100,000 copies. Across Europe, the album charted within the top twenty in multiple countries such as Portugal, Sweden, and Switzerland, while peaking at number 13 on the pancontinental European Top 100 Albums chart. In Finland, the album peaked at number six and was certified gold for shipments of 21,755 copies.

In Germany, Whitesnake's Greatest Hits reached number 51 on that chart and charted for 8 weeks. Despite having a successful cult following in that country, where all of the group's studio albums since Come an' Get It peaked inside the Top 30, the compilation failed to match its previous efforts. In Australia, it peaked at number 34 and spent four weeks in that chart. Nearly twelve years later, the album only peaked at number 95 in Spain. In the United States, the compilation was a commercial failure on the US Billboard 200 chart, where it only peaked at number 161 and stayed for two weeks inside the chart. On 7 November 1995, the Recording Industry Association of America (RIAA) certified it gold for sales of 500,000 units, and was eventually certified platinum for one million on 28 September 1998.

=== Reissue ===
On 6 May 2022, vocalist David Coverdale and RHINO Entertainment released the new remix for the Greatest Hits album (under the alias, Greatest Hits: Revisited, Remixed, Remastered), remixed by Chris Collier. It featured three new tracks in the tracklist: "Give Me All Your Love", "Guilty of Love", and the band's 2011 album title track, "Forevermore", with the only track "Looking for Love" removed from the remixed version.

The reissue charted on sub-genres of the UK Albums Chart, peaking at number 37 on the UK Rock & Metal Albums Chart running for a consecutive seven weeks, number 39 on Physical Albums, number 47 on Album Sales, number 98 on Album Downloads, and number 33 on the Scottish Albums chart.

== Track listing ==
No.	Title	Writer(s)	From	Length
1.	"Still of the Night"	David Coverdale, John Sykes	Whitesnake, 1987	6:38
2.	"Here I Go Again" (1987 Radio Mix)	Coverdale, Bernie Marsden	Whitesnake	3:53
3.	"Is This Love"	Coverdale, Sykes	Whitesnake	4:44
4.	"Love Ain't No Stranger"	Coverdale, Mel Galley	Slide It In, 1984	4:17
5.	"Looking for Love"	Coverdale, Sykes	1987 (Whitesnake European version)	6:31
6.	"Now You're Gone"	Coverdale, Adrian Vandenberg	Slip of the Tongue, 1989	4:12
7.	"Slide It In"	Coverdale	Slide It In	3:20
8.	"Slow an' Easy"	Coverdale, Micky Moody	Slide It In	6:09
9.	"Judgement Day"	Coverdale, Vandenberg	Slip of the Tongue	5:16
10.	"You're Gonna Break My Heart Again"	Coverdale, Sykes	1987	4:11
11.	"The Deeper the Love"	Coverdale, Vandenberg	Slip of the Tongue	4:22
12.	"Crying in the Rain" ('87 version)	Coverdale	Whitesnake	5:36
13.	"Fool for Your Loving '89" (re-recorded version)	Coverdale, Marsden, Moody	Slip of the Tongue	4:11
14.	"Sweet Lady Luck"	Coverdale, Vandenberg	B-Side of 12" single"The Deeper the Love/Judgment Day", 1990	4:34

=== Greatest Hits: Revisited, Remixed, Remastered (2022) ===
The tracklist of the 2022 remix has a different setlist of songs from the preceding 1994 Greatest Hits album.

No.	Title	Writer(s)	From	Length
1.	"Still of the Night" (2022 Remix)		Whitesnake	6:50
2.	"Here I Go Again" (2022 Remix)		Whitesnake	4:32
3.	"Is This Love" (2022 Remix)		Whitesnake	5:03
4.	"Give Me All Your Love" (2022 Remix)	Coverdale, Sykes	Whitesnake	3:13
5.	"Love Ain't No Stranger" (2022 Remix)		Slide It In	4:19
6.	"Slide It In" (2022 Remix)		Slide It In	3:19
7.	"Slow an' Easy" (2022 Remix)		Slide It In	6:10
8.	"Guilty of Love" (2022 Remix)	Coverdale	Slide It In	3:23
9.	"Fool for Your Loving" (2022 Remix)		Slip of the Tongue	4:11
10.	"Judgement Day" (2022 Remix)		Slip of the Tongue	5:23
11.	"The Deeper the Love" (2022 Remix)		Slip of the Tongue	4:09
12.	"Now You're Gone" (2022 Remix)		Slip of the Tongue	4:10
13.	"Sweet Lady Luck" (2022 Remix)		B-Side of "The Deeper the Love"	4:36
14.	"You're Gonna Break My Heart Again" (2022 Remix)		Whitesnake (European Version)	4:16
15.	"Crying in the Rain" (2022 Remix)		Whitesnake	5:48
16.	"Forevermore" (2022 Remix)	Coverdale, Aldrich	Forevermore	7:06

== Personnel ==
Credits are adapted from the compilation album's liner notes. For original song album credits, see Slide It In, Whitesnake and Slip of the Tongue.

Management

- John Kalodner – A&R
- Debra Shallman – A&R Coordination
- Jeff Magid – project coordination
- Howard Kaufman – management

Design

- Hugh Syme – art direction, emblem design, cover concept development
- Bernard Boudreau – photography
- Sal Manna – liner notes

Technical

- George Marino – remastering
- David J. Donnelly – mastering supervisor

== Charts ==
=== Album ===
Chart (1994)	Peak position
Australian Albums (ARIA)	34
European Albums (Top 100)	13
Finnish Albums (The Official Finnish Charts)	6
German Albums (Offizielle Top 100)	51
Japanese Albums (Oricon)	27
Portuguese Albums (AFP)	13
Scottish Albums (OCC)	5
Spanish Albums (Promusicae)	95
Swedish Albums (Sverigetopplistan)	17
Swiss Albums (Schweizer Hitparade)	12
UK Albums (OCC)	4
UK Rock & Metal Albums (OCC)	1
US Billboard 200	161

Chart (2006)	Peak position
Spanish Albums (Promusicae)	95

Chart (2022)	Peak position
Japanese Albums (Oricon)	39
Japanese Hot Albums (Billboard Japan)	45
UK Rock & Metal Albums (OCC)	3

=== Singles ===
Year	Single	Chart	Position
1994	"Is This Love"	UK Singles Chart	25

== Certifications and sales ==
Region	Certification	Certified units/sales
Finland (Musiikkituottajat)	Gold	21,755
Japan (RIAJ)	Gold	100,000^{^}
Japan 2022 release	—	1,906
United Kingdom (BPI)	Gold	100,000^{^}
United States (RIAA)	Platinum	1,000,000^{^}
^{^} Shipments figures based on certification alone.

== Release history ==
Release formats for Whitesnake's Greatest Hits
Region	Date	Label	Format	Catalogue	Edition	Ref.
Europe	4 July 1994	EMI	LP; cassette; CD	EMD 1065	Standard	
North America	19 July 1994	Geffen	cassette; CD	GEFD 24620	Standard	
Japan	21 July 1994	Sony Music Entertainment Japan	CD; MiniDisc	SRCS 7440	Standard	
Worldwide	6 May 2022 (Digital); 17 June 2022 (Physical); 17 July 2022 (CD/Blu-ray Set)	Rhino; Warner Music	Digital download; Streaming; CD; LP; Blu-ray; SHM-CD	R1680917 (Vinyl); R2680916 (CD)	Revisited, Remixed, Remastered Edition	
Japan	6 May 2022 (Digital); 17 June 2022 (Physical); 17 July 2022 (CD/Blu-ray Set)	Rhino; Warner Music	Digital download; Streaming; CD; LP; Blu-ray; SHM-CD	WPZR-18528 (CD); WPZR-30928/9 (CD/Blu-Ray)	Revisited, Remixed, Remastered Edition	
