= The Early Years (Whitesnake album) =

Compilation album by Whitesnake
- Released: 2004
- Recorded: 1978–83
- Genres: Hard rock, blues rock, heavy metal
- Length: 75:15
- Label: EMI

Whitesnake chronology
The Silver Anniversary Collection (2003)	The Early Years (2004)	The Definitive Collection (2006)

Professional ratings
Review scores
Source	Rating
AllMusic	3.5/5 stars

The Early Years is a compilation album by British-American rock band Whitesnake, released in 2004. The album's track listing was compiled by David Coverdale, spanning 1978's Trouble to 1984's Slide It In.

== Track listing ==
1. "Walking in the Shadow of the Blues" - 4:19 (from Lovehunter)
2. "Sweet Talker" - 3:35 (from Ready an' Willing)
3. "Would I Lie to You" - 4:27 (from Come an' Get It)
4. "Trouble" - 4:41 (from Trouble)
5. "Gambler" - 3:59 (from Slide It In)
6. "Lovehunter" - 5:31 (from Lovehunter)
7. "Don't Break My Heart Again" - 4:00 (from Come an' Get It)
8. "Ready an' Willing" - 3:15 (Ready an Willing)
9. "Child of Babylon" - 4:22 (from Come an' Get It)
10. "Here I Go Again" - 4:58 (from Saints & Sinners)
11. "Carry Your Load" - 4:00 (from Ready an' Willing)
12. "Rough an' Ready" - 2:54 (from Saints & Sinners)
13. "Wine, Women an' Song" - 3:23 (from Come an' Get It)
14. "Lie Down... I Think I Love You" - 3:09 (from Trouble)
15. "Ain't No Love in the Heart of the City" - 6:12 (from Live at Hammersmith)
16. "Fool for Your Loving" - 4:31 (from Live...in the Heart of the City)
17. "Take Me with You" - 6:22 (from Live...in the Heart of the City)
18. "We Wish You Well" - 1:37 (from Lovehunter)
