= Soldier of Fortune (Deep Purple song) =

Song by Deep Purple

from the album Stormbringer
- Released: December 1974
- Recorded: August 1974
- Genre: Blues rock
- Length: 3:13
- Label: EMI/Purple
- Songwriters: David Coverdale, Ritchie Blackmore

"Soldier of Fortune" is a rock ballad written by Ritchie Blackmore and David Coverdale and originally released on Deep Purple's 1974 album Stormbringer. Although Deep Purple have never released the song as a single and it has never placed on the record charts, it has developed a cult following over the years and has been covered by many artists and bands.

== Other releases ==
"Soldier of Fortune" has featured on several albums since Stormbringer:

- Last Concert in Japan (1977)
- Fireworks (Italy-only compilation) (1985)
- This Time Around: Live in Tokyo (2001)
- The Platinum Collection (2005)
- Deepest Purple: The Very Best of Deep Purple 30th Anniversary Edition (2010)

== Cover versions ==
- Whitesnake's version first appeared on the 1997 live album Starkers in Tokyo, then later on The Silver Anniversary Collection (2003), 30th Anniversary Collection (2008) and Made in Britain/World Record (Live) (2013), then in a studio version on their 2015 album The Purple Album, which was also released as a single.
- Opeth's version was first released as a bonus track on the Special Edition of their 2005 album Ghost Reveries, then as a single on 6 March 2007. Roadrunner Records lists Opeth's version among the label's 13 "wildest covers", calling it a faithful cover and noting the band's guitarist/vocalist Mikael Åkerfeldt's "unexpectedly soulful vocals".
- Black Majesty on the 2007 album Tomorrowland.
- Bosquito on the 2003 album Cocktail Molotov.
- Blackmore's Night on the 2002 album Past Times with Good Company.
- Topi Sorsakoski in a Finnish version on his 2002 album under the title Luotu lähtemään ("Born to depart")
- Gyula Vikidál in a Hungarian version on his 1985 solo album under the title Szerencse katonája.
- Jiří Schelinger in a Czech version in 1977 under the title Šípková Růženka ("Sleeping Beauty").
