= The Purple Album (Whitesnake album) =

Studio album by Whitesnake
- Released: 29 April 2015
- Recorded: 2014–2015
- Studios: Hook City, Reno, Nevada
- Genre: Hard rock
- Length: 66:01
- Labels: Frontiers; Rhino/Warner (Reissue)
- Producers: David Coverdale, Michael McIntyre, Reb Beach

Whitesnake chronology
Made in Japan (2013)	The Purple Album (2015)	Flesh & Blood (2019)

Singles from The Purple Album
- 1. "Stormbringer" Released: 25 February 2015; 2. "Burn" Released: 24 March 2015; 3. "Lay Down Stay Down" Released: 7 April 2015; 4. "Soldier of Fortune" Released: 22 April 2015; 5. "Mistreated" Released: 10 January 2016
Greatest Hits: Revisited, Remixed, Remastered (2022)	The Purple Album: Special Gold Edition (2023)	Into the Light: The Solo Albums (2024)

Alternative cover
- 2023 Reissue Special Gold Edition

The Purple Album is the twelfth studio album by British-American rock band Whitesnake. It contains remakes of songs from Deep Purple band lineups Mark III and Mark IV, when Whitesnake lead singer David Coverdale was a member of that band. It was released on 29 April in Japan, 15 May in Europe, 18 May in the UK and 19 May 2015 in the US through Frontiers Records. On 13 October 2023, Whitesnake and RHINO reissued The Purple Album: Special Gold Edition in celebration of Coverdale's 50th anniversary of joining the Deep Purple, besides remixing and remastering, "features previously unreleased recordings, including the very demo that secured Coverdale's spot with Deep Purple".

== Background ==
A collection of re-recorded songs from Coverdale's time in Deep Purple, the idea sprang from talks he and Jon Lord had about a possible Mark III reunion a few years earlier. After Lord's death in 2012, Coverdale discussed the idea with Ritchie Blackmore, but they were unable to come to an agreement on the nature of the undertaking. Coverdale then decided to move forward with the project under the Whitesnake banner. Originally, the idea was acclaimed by Coverdale's wife, Cindy, "who suggested I (David) consider it as a Whitesnake project" in late 2013. He described the resulting record as a tribute to his time in Deep Purple.

== Recording ==
Coverdale worked on his project at the recently built Hook City Studios in Reno, Nevada. Guitarist Joel Hoekstra joined Whitesnake for the first time to record with them since Doug Aldrich's departure in 2014. Drummer Tommy Aldridge had also recently returned to the group after his departure in 2007. This was Aldrige's second studio recording with the group since 1989, where he last played Slip of the Tongue.

Beach mentioned that his guitar solos were enforceably have to be approved by Coverdale for the entire album.

== Touring ==
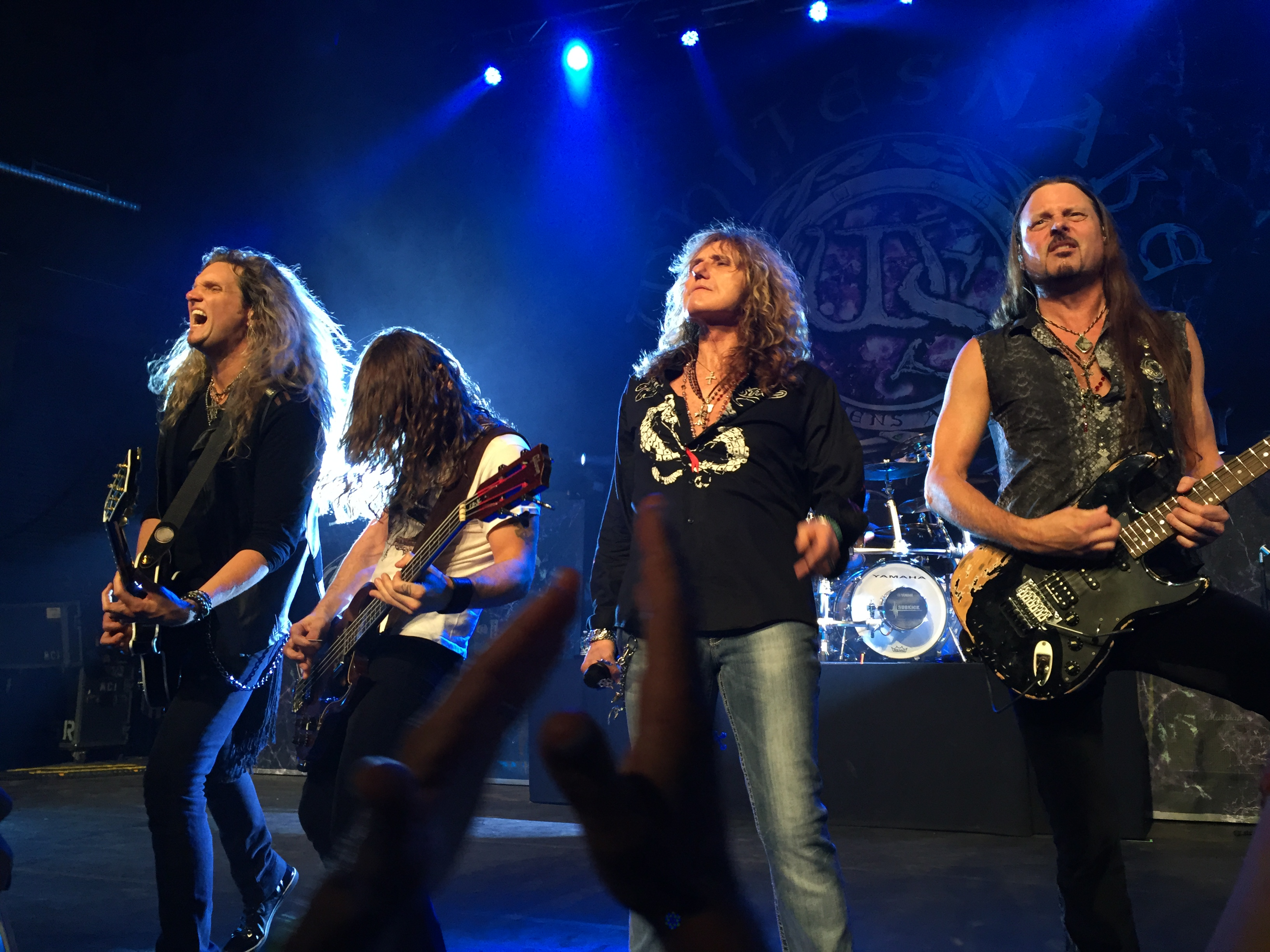
Whitesnake performing at College Street Music Hall in New Haven, Connecticut, July 2015.

Whitesnake kicked off the North American leg of The Purple Tour in May 2015. Joining the band was new keyboardist Michele Luppi. At a show in California, they were joined onstage by Coverdale's former Deep Purple bandmate, Glenn Hughes. They also held Japanese tour dates on October and November.

== Reception ==
=== Commercial performance ===
The album reached number 18 on the UK Albums Chart and peaked at 2nd position on the UK Rock & Metal Albums Chart, while in the US it peaked at number 87 on Billboard 200 with first week sales of around 6,900 units. On the Billboard's Independent Albums chart it reached number nine, and number eight on Japanese Oricon Albums Chart.

=== Critical reception ===
Professional ratings
Review scores
Source	Rating
The Herald-Standard	(favourable)
KNAC	4/5 stars
The New York Times	(favourable)
New Noise Magazine	(favourable)
Metal Hammer (Germany)	6/7
Classic Rock	1/5 stars
laut.de	1/5 stars

The album was met with mostly favourable reviews, but altogether polarized critics. Among the favourable reviews, Associated Press as reported by The New York Times concluded that "it's good to hear someone dust off these tracks and breathe some life into them", Rick Ecker of New Noise Magazine said about the songs that "you get the feeling of love and reverence that Coverdale has for them and the time he spent with Deep Purple. The performance of the band is fantastic with the power and sweetness of the songs present, of course it sounds more modern, but it doesn't take away from the beauty of these songs". Duane Vickers in 4/5 review for KNAC concluded that "out of the past, comes something new, done big and done right. We see so many cover albums coming out and we usually come away thinking that they should've just left that alone. The fact that a band influenced an artist doesn't always translate to that artist being able to do the song justice by covering it. No worries with Mr. Coverdale, these were his songs and Whitesnake rocks them proud". Matthias Mineur in a 6/7 review for Germany's Metal Hammer also praised that Coverdale gave songs new arrangements.

However, other reviews weren't in-between yet very unfavourable. Dave Everley for Classic Rock gave it a 1/5 review arguing that it is "not hard to love the 13 songs here – it's impossible", although "let's be clear here. Whitesnake are one of the great British bands of the past 40 years, and Coverdale is one of the finest blue-eyed soul singers, full-stop" but "this wrong-headed travesty of an album won't just have Jon Lord spinning in his grave, it'll have Ritchie Blackmore making like a Catherine Wheel too". Ulf Kubanke of laut.de also gave it a 1/5 score and considered it is "very posy, but without any charisma", such a "sad picture" that "so far, John Fogerty has held the record for the most consistent self-mutilation of his own work with his equally anemic Wrote a Song for Everyone. Whitesnake top this golden raspberry with surprisingly suicidal ease".

Responding to the negative criticism, Coverdale proclaimed: "I've no space in my life for haters or negaters. [...] I owe those people nothing. Such opinions mean nothing to me."

== Track listing ==
No.	Title	Writer(s)	Original album	Length
1.	"Burn"	Ritchie Blackmore, David Coverdale, Glenn Hughes, Jon Lord, Ian Paice	Burn (1974)	6:56
2.	"You Fool No One" (interpolating "Itchy Fingers")	Blackmore, Coverdale, Hughes, Lord, Paice	Burn	6:23
3.	"Love Child"	Tommy Bolin, Coverdale	Come Taste the Band (1975)	4:13
4.	"Sail Away" (featuring "Elegy for Jon")	Blackmore, Coverdale	Burn	4:53
5.	"The Gypsy"	Blackmore, Coverdale, Hughes, Lord, Paice	Stormbringer (1974)	5:29
6.	"Lady Double Dealer"	Blackmore, Coverdale	Stormbringer	3:59
7.	"Mistreated"	Blackmore, Coverdale	Burn	7:39
8.	"Holy Man"	Coverdale, Hughes, Lord	Stormbringer	4:42
9.	"Might Just Take Your Life"	Blackmore, Coverdale, Hughes, Lord, Paice	Burn	4:14
10.	"You Keep On Moving"	Coverdale, Hughes	Come Taste the Band	5:06
11.	"Soldier of Fortune"	Blackmore, Coverdale	Stormbringer	3:18
12.	"Lay Down Stay Down"	Blackmore, Coverdale, Hughes, Lord, Paice	Burn	3:52
13.	"Stormbringer"	Blackmore, Coverdale	Stormbringer	5:17

Deluxe edition bonus tracks
No.	Title	Writer(s)	Original album	Length
14.	"Lady Luck"	Jeff Cook, Coverdale	Come Taste the Band	3:02
15.	"Comin' Home"	Bolin, Coverdale, Paice	Come Taste the Band	4:15

Japanese edition bonus track
No.	Title	Writer(s)	Original album	Length
16.	"Soldier of Fortune" (alternate mix)	Blackmore, Coverdale	Stormbringer	3:18

The Purple Album: Special Gold Edition (2023 Remix)
No.	Title	Length
1.	"Burn"	6:50
2.	"Lay Down, Stay Down"	3:56
3.	"Love Child"	4:13
4.	"Holy Man"	4:48
5.	"The Gypsy"	5:29
6.	"Lady Double Dealer"	3:56
7.	"Might Just Take Your Life"	4:36
8.	"Mistreated"	7:37
9.	"Stormbringer"	5:19
10.	"Sail Away"	4:51
11.	"You Keep On Moving"	5:11
12.	"Lady Luck"	3:03
13.	"Coming Home"	4:19
14.	"You Fool No One"	6:41
15.	"Soldier of Fortune"	3:21

Disc two: 2017 The Purple Tour Five Live (2023 Remix) [Tracks 1–5]^{[†]}
No.	Title	Length
1.	"Burn (Live)"	8:13
2.	"The Gypsy (Live)"	5:21
3.	"Mistreated (Live)"	7:55
4.	"You Fool No One (Live)"	9:39
5.	"Soldier of Fortune"	3:53

Disc two: Alternate Mixes (2023 Remix) [Tracks 6–11]*
No.	Title	Length
6.	"Holy Man (Unzipped)"	3:44
7.	"Stormbringer (Punch in the Nuts Mix)"	5:19
8.	"Love Child (Alternate Mix)"	4:13
9.	"Soldier of Fortune (feat. Joel Hoekstra & The Hook City Strings)"	3:19
10.	"Soldier of Fortune (feat. The Hook City Strings)"	3:18
11.	"Soldier of Fortune (feat. The Hook City Strings) [Instrumental]"	3:18

Disc two: David Coverdale's Demo Tapes [Tracks 12–16]*
No.	Title	Length
12.	"Everybody's Talkin'"	2:45
13.	"Get Ready"	2:34
14.	"Lonely Town, Lonely Street"	3:14
15.	"Dancing in the Street"	4:32
16.	"1974 DC Demo Ideas for the Stormbringer Album"	5:57

- - previously unreleased tracks

† Recorded at Genting Arena, Birmingham, England on 12 December 2015

== Personnel ==
All credits are adapted from Tidal, Apple Music, and its liner notes.

Whitesnake

- David Coverdale – vocals
- Reb Beach – guitars, backing vocals
- Joel Hoekstra – guitars, acoustic guitar ("Sail Away", "Soldier of Fortune"), backing vocals
- Michael Devin – bass, harmonica, backing vocals
- Tommy Aldridge – drums

Additional musicians

- Derek Hilland – keyboards
- Jasper Coverdale – backing vocals ("Stormbringer")
- Jessica Coverdale – backing vocals ("Stormbringer")
- Jack Hoekstra – backing vocals ("Stormbringer")

Technical

- David Coverdale – producer, mixing assistant
- Michael McIntyre – producer, engineer, mixing
- Reb Beach – producer, mixing assistant
- David Donnelly – mastering (at DNA Studios, Los Angeles)

Design

- Hugh Gilmour – artwork, design
- Ash Newell – band photography

Management

- Davis Weise – business management
- Debbi Bogle – business management
- Erin Kalbron – business management
- Andrea Botts – business management
- Terri Beverford – business management
- Jon Payne – business management
- Rod MacSween – business management, business agent
- Glenn Davis – business management
- Gery Buck – business agent

Reissue

- David Coverdale – executive producer
- Tom Gordon – producer, percussion
- Reb Beach – producer
- Derek Sherinian – keyboards (2023 remix)
- Michele Luppi – keyboards (2023 remix)
- Chris Collier – remixing (2023 remix)
- Scott Hull – remastering (at Masterdisk, New York)
- Hugh Gilmour – artwork, design, A&R
- Alex Breckenridge – engineer
- Jeremiah Luke Wynn – engineer
- Wayne Kamemoto – business management
- Rob Gross – product manager
- Andrew Campbell – production manager
- Ruth Lenz – violin (Hook City Strings)
- Olga Archdekin – violin (Hook City Strings)
- Virginia Evans – viola (Hook City Strings)
- Luciana Gallo – cello (Hook City Strings)

== Charts ==
In 2015 the vinyl LP charted on the UK Official Vinyl Albums Chart at the 16th position.

Chart (2015)	Peak position
Austrian Albums (Ö3 Austria)	28
Belgian Albums (Ultratop Flanders)	40
Belgian Albums (Ultratop Wallonia)	70
Dutch Albums (Album Top 100)	24
Finnish Albums (Suomen virallinen lista)	2
French Albums (SNEP)	150
German Albums (Offizielle Top 100)	13
Hungarian Albums (MAHASZ)	9
Italian Albums (FIMI)	91
Japanese Albums (Oricon)	8
Norwegian Albums (VG-lista)	32
Scottish Albums (Official Charts)	16
Swedish Albums (Sverigetopplistan)	17
Swiss Albums (Schweizer Hitparade)	11
UK Albums (Official Charts)	18
UK Rock & Metal Albums (Official Charts)	2
UK Independent Albums (Official Charts)	12
US Billboard 200	87
US Independent Albums (Billboard)	9
US Top Hard Rock Albums (Billboard)	6
US Indie Store Album Sales (Billboard)	16
US Top Rock Albums (Billboard)	25

Chart (2023)	Peak position
Japanese Albums (Oricon)	48
Japanese Rock Albums (Billboard Japan)	8
Japanese Hot Albums (Billboard Japan	55
UK Rock & Metal Albums (Official Charts)	7
