= After Midnight (2014 film) =

2014 film by Fred Olen Ray

- Film poster
- Directed by: Fred Olen Ray
- Written by: Andrew Helm; Fred Olen Ray
- Produced by: Dan Golden; Fred Olen Ray
- Starring: Tawny Kitaen; Catherine Annette; Tim Abell; Jeneta St. Clair; Bobby Rice; Richard Grieco
- Cinematography: Theo Angell
- Edited by: Randy Carter
- Music by: Matt Jantzen
- Production company: Retromedia Entertainment
- Distributed by: BayView Entertainment
- Release date: October 28, 2014
- Running time: 86 minutes
- Country: United States
- Language: English

After Midnight (also known as Naked After Midnight) is a 2014 American erotic mystery/horror thriller film directed by Fred Olen Ray and starring Richard Grieco and Tawny Kitaen in her final film role.

== Premise ==
After the murder of an exotic dancer at a strip club, her sister goes undercover to catch the killer. To get revenge, she must race against the clock and find the killer, as everyone is a suspect.

== Cast ==
- Richard Grieco as Dr. Sam Hubbard
- Tawny Kitaen as Rikki
- Catherine Annette as Constance
- Tim Abell as John
- Jeneta St. Clair as Duffy / Ann
- Bobby Rice as Julian
- Tiffany Tynes as Misty
- Erika Jordan as Tina
- Christine Nguyen as Zoey

== Production ==
The film's promotion tried to capitalize on the notoriety of Grieco and Kitaen.

== Release ==
The film was released via VOD on October 28, 2014. A DVD version was released in 2015, and a Blu-ray in 2016.

== Reception ==
The website Irish Film Critic was extremely critical of the film, to the point of finding that it was "chock-full of some of the worst acting in cinematic history", while a review at Nerdly, also rather negative, stated: "To cut a long story short, After Midnight is Law and Order: Showgirls, only with a strange supernatural twist. Totally ridiculous and ridiculously bad."
