= The Last Note of Freedom =

Single by David Coverdale

from the album Days of Thunder
- B-side: "Gimme Some Lovin'" by Terry Reid; "Car Building" by Hans Zimmer
- Released: 24 September 1990
- Genre: Hard rock
- Length: 5:44
- Label: Epic
- Composers: David Coverdale; Hans Zimmer
- Lyricists: David Coverdale; Billy Idol
- Producer: Trevor Horn

David Coverdale singles chronology
"Breakdown" (1978)	"The Last Note of Freedom" (1990)	"Take Me for a Little While" (1993)

"The Last Note of Freedom" is a song by British rock singer David Coverdale, released in 1990 as part of the soundtrack to the American film Days of Thunder. The song was written by Hans Zimmer, Billy Idol and Coverdale, and produced by Trevor Horn.

Issued by Epic Records, the single represented one of Coverdale's few solo recordings outside of his work with Whitesnake at the time. It reached number 78 on the UK Singles Chart.

== Background and release ==
The track was recorded during sessions for Days of Thunder. It was the opening track on the soundtrack.

== Chart performance ==
The single debuted and peaked at number 78 in the UK Singles Chart on 6 October 1990.

Chart (1990)	Peak position
UK Singles (Official Charts)	78
