= Tawny Kitaen =

American actress (1961–2021)

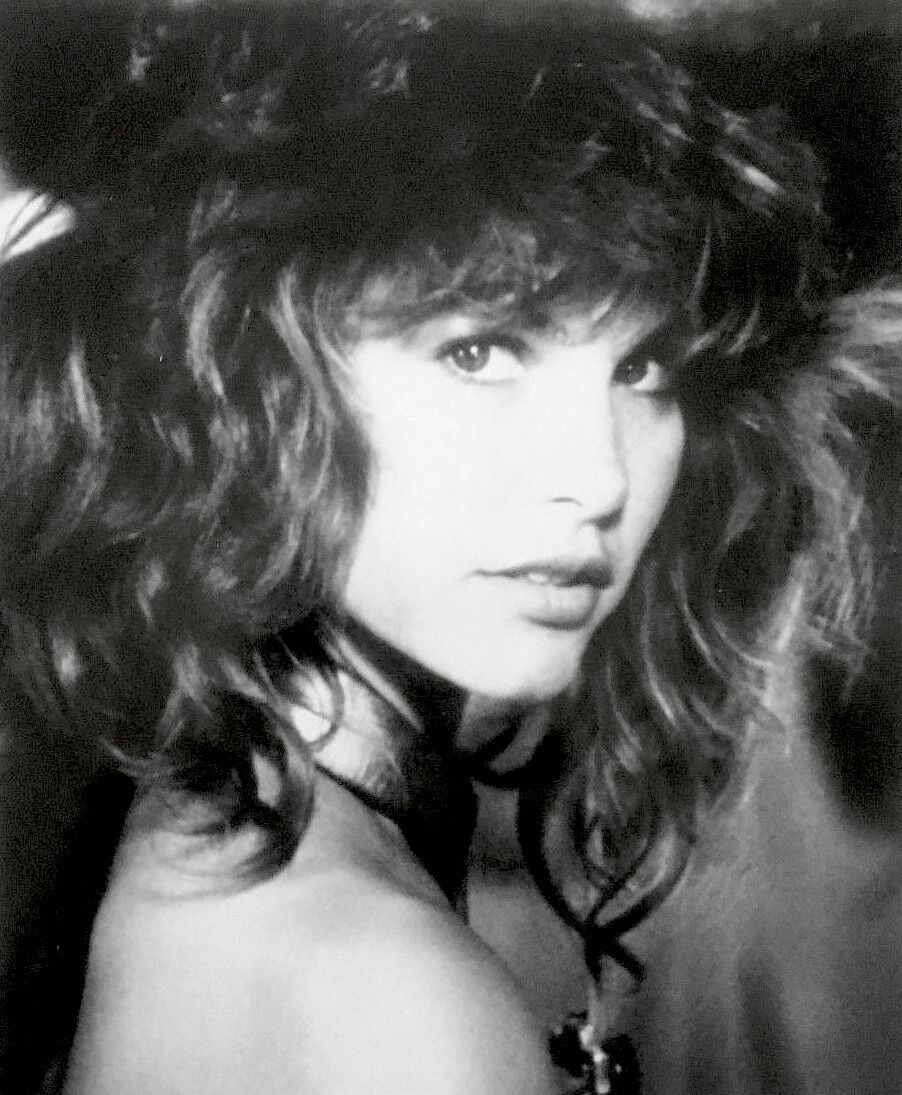
- Kitaen in 1984
- Born: Julie Ellen Kitaen; August 5, 1961; San Diego, California, U.S.
- Died: May 7, 2021 (aged 59); Newport Beach, California, U.S.
- Occupation: Actress
- Years active: 1976–2017
- Spouses: David Coverdale (m. 1989; div. 1991) Chuck Finley (m. 1997; div. 2002)
- Children: 2

Julie Ellen "Tawny" Kitaen (/kɪˈteɪn/ ki-TAYN; August 5, 1961 – May 7, 2021) was an American actress. She began her career as a television actress, appearing in the television films Malibu (1983) and California Girls (1985). She also starred in the comedies The Perils of Gwendoline in the Land of the Yik-Yak and Bachelor Party (both 1984), and the horror film Witchboard (1986).

Kitaen garnered widespread recognition for her appearances in a number of music videos, including Ratt's "Back for More" (1984) and Whitesnake's "Still of the Night", "Is This Love" and "Here I Go Again" (all 1987).

In the 2000s, Kitaen began appearing on reality television series, including The Surreal Life (2006) and Celebrity Rehab with Dr. Drew (2008), the latter of which documented Kitaen's issues with substance abuse.

== Early life ==
Julie Ellen Kitaen was born in San Diego, California on August 5, 1961. She was the eldest of three children born to Linda Kitaen (née Taylor), a housewife and one-time beauty pageant participant, and Terry Kitaen, an employee of a neon sign company. Kitaen's mother was of Irish and Scottish descent, while her father was of Russian-Jewish heritage. Kitaen was raised in her father's Jewish faith.

She began using the nickname "Tawny" at the age of 12 on her own initiative. As a child, she struggled with dyslexia, which led to her dropping out of Mission Bay High School. At the age of 14, with backstage passes after a Peter Frampton concert at Balboa Stadium, she witnessed the VIP treatment afforded to Frampton's girlfriend Penny and aspired to attain it for herself.

== Career ==
Kitaen modeled and appeared in television commercials for Jack LaLanne's European Health Spas in the early 1980s. In a January 2021 Instagram post a few months before her death, she claimed the experience inspired her to become an actress.

Kitaen appeared on the cover of Ratt's debut EP Ratt (1983) and the band's debut studio album Out of the Cellar (1984). She was dating the band's guitarist Robbin Crosby at the time.

Kitaen began her acting career in 1983 with a minor role in the television movie Malibu. In 1984, she starred as the title character of the erotic adventure movie The Perils of Gwendoline in the Land of the Yik-Yak, also called Gwendoline. Her other film appearances include Bachelor Party (1984) as the bride-to-be of Tom Hanks' character, and starring roles in Witchboard (1986), White Hot (1988), and Dead Tides (1996).

She appeared in several music videos in the 1980s for the band Whitesnake, including the hits "Here I Go Again", "Still of the Night", "Is This Love", and "The Deeper the Love". She also appeared in Ratt's "Back for More" music video.

From February to July 1989, she appeared as Lisa DiNapoli on the daytime serial Santa Barbara. She appeared on Seinfeld as Jerry's girlfriend in the 1991 episode "The Nose Job." She appeared in 19 episodes of the TV series The New WKRP in Cincinnati from 1991 to 1993 as nighttime DJ Mona Loveland, who has a show titled Mona Til Midnight. She also had recurring parts in Hercules: The Legendary Journeys and co-hosted America's Funniest People from 1992 to 1994.

Kitaen joined the cast of the sixth edition of the reality television show The Surreal Life, which began airing in March 2006. She also appeared in the second season of the VH1 reality TV show Celebrity Rehab with Dr. Drew, which began in October 2008. She appeared on Botched, requesting that her breast implants be removed.

== Personal life and death ==
Kitaen dated Ratt guitarist Robbin Crosby during and after high school. They lived together as teenagers when Crosby was in the band Phenomenon.

She married Whitesnake singer David Coverdale in 1989; they divorced in 1991.

Kitaen had a year-long affair with football player, actor, and media personality O.J. Simpson when he was married to Nicole Brown Simpson. The affair was revealed at Simpson's 1997 civil trial for wrongful death.

Kitaen was married to baseball player Chuck Finley from 1997 to 2002, with whom she had two daughters. In 2002 she was charged with domestic violence for an incident involving Finley; in a plea bargain, she agreed to enter a spousal battery counseling program and avoid contact with Finley. Three days later, Finley filed for divorce.

In November 2006, prosecutors charged Kitaen with possessing 15 grams of cocaine in her home in Orange County, California. The authorities said her two children were home at the time and that she had granted deputies permission for the search. In December 2006, Kitaen entered a six-month rehabilitation program in exchange for the dismissal of a drug-possession charge.

On September 26, 2009, Kitaen was arrested for driving under the influence in Newport Beach, California. The following July, she pleaded no contest to misdemeanor DUI and was sentenced to two days in jail, ordered to attend a first-offender alcohol program and required to perform 64 hours of community service.

On July 22, 2019, Kitaen was again arrested for DUI in Newport Beach. She was charged with a misdemeanor related to the arrest on October 22 of that year. Kitaen pleaded not guilty and was scheduled for a pretrial hearing on May 18, 2021. However, she died before the hearing could take place. If convicted, Kitaen could have been incarcerated.

=== Death ===
Kitaen died at her home in Newport Beach on May 7, 2021, at the age of 59, from heart issues and drug ingestion. She had been working with author and historian Colin Heaton on her memoirs for the past year. Kitaen's death was confirmed to the New York Times by her daughter, who told the paper that the cause of death was not immediately known. Police reported that nothing at the scene indicated alcohol or drugs as a factor in the death. The Orange County coroner's office declared it a "residential death", without further details.

In October 2021, the Orange County coroner's office announced Kitaen's official cause of death was dilated cardiomyopathy, a common type of heart disease. Other contributing factors to her death included mild coronary atherosclerosis and drug ingestion, including mirtazapine, alprazolam, acetaminophen, pregabalin, and hydrocodone.

== Filmography ==
=== Film ===
| Year | Title | Role | Notes | Ref. |
|---|---|---|---|---|
| 1984 | The Perils of Gwendoline in the Land of the Yik-Yak | Gwendoline | | |
| 1984 | Bachelor Party | Debbie Thompson | | |
| 1986 | Witchboard | Linda Brewster | | |
| 1986 | Crystal Heart | Alley Daniels | | |
| 1986 | Instant Justice | Virginia | | |
| 1987 | Happy Hour | Misty Roberts | | |
| 1988 | White Hot | Vanessa | | |
| 1993 | Three of Hearts | Woman in Bar | | |
| 1996 | Playback | Sara Burgess | | |
| 1996 | Dead Tides | Nola | | |
| 2009 | Tom Cool | | Unreleased | |
| 2011 | Here We Go Again | Herself | Short film | |
| 2014 | After Midnight | Rikki | | |
| 2015 | Come Simi | Dee Dee | | |

=== Television ===
| Year | Title | Role | Notes | Ref. |
|---|---|---|---|---|
| 1976 | To Tell the Truth | Herself | Game show | |
| 1983 | Malibu | Mahoney's girlfriend | TV film | |
| 1985 | California Girls | Karen Malone | TV film | |
| 1986–1987 | Capitol | Meredith Ross | TV series | |
| 1987 | Glory Years | Melinda Murphy | TV film | |
| 1989 | Santa Barbara | Lisa DiNapoli | Appeared between February 28, 1989, and July 21, 1989 | |
| 1989 | Booker | Skylar Samperton | Episode: "Someone Stole Lucille" | |
| 1991 | They Came from Outer Space | Monica Bates | Episode: "Sex, Lies & UFOs: Part 2" | |
| 1991 | Veronica Clare | | Guest appearance | |
| 1991 | Seinfeld | Isabel | Episode: "The Nose Job" | |
| 1991–1993 | The New WKRP in Cincinnati | Mona Loveland | Main role (19 episodes) | |
| 1992–1994 | America's Funniest People | Co-host | Succeeded Arleen Sorkin | |
| 1992–1996 | Eek! The Cat | Annabelle (voice) | Main role (39 episodes) | |
| 1994 | Married... with Children | Dominique | Episode: "Shoeway to Heaven" | |
| 1994 | Hercules and the Circle of Fire | Deianeira | TV film | |
| 1994 | Hercules in the Underworld | Deianeira | TV film | |
| 1994 | Hercules in the Maze of the Minotaur | Deianeira | TV film | |
| 1995 | The Naked Truth | Herself | Episode: "Real Life Henry Higgins Turns Dork into Duke!" | |
| 1995 | Burke's Law | Rhonda Dooley | Episode: "Who Killed Cock-a-Doodle Dooley?" | |
| 1995 | Hercules: The Legendary Journeys | Deianeira | Episodes: "The Wrong Path", "The Other Side" | |
| 1997 | Hercules: The Legendary Journeys | Deianeira | Episode: "When a Man Loves a Woman" | |
| 2006 | The Surreal Life | Herself | | |
| 2006 | Behind the Music | Herself | Episode: "Ratt" | |
| 2008 | Celebrity Rehab with Dr. Drew | Herself | | |
| 2011 | CSI: Crime Scene Investigation | Lydia Kole | Episode: "Father of the Bride" | |
| 2012 | Life@Large | Diane Kaplan | Web miniseries | |
| 2017 | Botched | Herself | Episode: "Boob Trains and Big Butts" | |

=== Music videos ===
| Year | Title | Artist | Ref. |
|---|---|---|---|
| 1984 | "Back for More" | Ratt | |
| 1987 | "Still of the Night" | Whitesnake | |
| 1987 | "Here I Go Again" | Whitesnake | |
| 1987 | "Is This Love" | Whitesnake | |
| 1989 | "Fool for Your Loving" | Whitesnake | |
| 1990 | "The Deeper the Love" | Whitesnake | |
| 2006 | "Story of My Life" | Smash Mouth | |
