= Slip of the Tongue =

Studio album by Whitesnake
- Released: 7 November 1989
- Recorded: August 1988–1989
- Studio: Record Plant (Los Angeles)
- Genres: Glam metal; hard rock
- Length: 46:47
- Labels: Geffen; EMI
- Producers: Mike Clink; Keith Olsen

Whitesnake chronology
| Whitesnake (1987) | Slip of the Tongue (1989) | Whitesnake's Greatest Hits (1994) |

Alternative cover
- 20th Anniversary CD release

Alternative cover
- 30th Anniversary release

Singles from Slip of the Tongue
- 1. "Fool for Your Loving '89" Released: 13 November 1989 (Note: First released on 17 October 1989 in the US.); 2. "The Deeper the Love" Released: 26 February 1990 (Note: First released on January 1990 in the US and 21 February in Japan.); 3. "Now You're Gone" Released: 13 August 1990 (Note: First released on 21 May 1990 in Japan.)

David Coverdale chronology
| Whitesnake (1987) | Slip of the Tongue (1989) | Coverdale–Page (1993) |

Slip of the Tongue is the eighth studio album by the British-American hard rock band Whitesnake, released on 7 November 1989 in the US, by Geffen Records and six days later in Europe, by EMI. The album marked a continuation of the band's commercial success, following their multi-platinum performance of their 1987 self-titled release. Known for its polished production and a shift toward a more technical, virtuosic guitar style, the album features guitarist Steve Vai, who recorded the majority after guitarist Adrian Vandenberg was sidelined by a wrist injury. This was Keith Olsen's second and final appearance producing the group's release, while Mike Clink received the only co-producing credit for the group.

Slip of the Tongue became the group's second consecutive album to go on to the top ten of the Billboard 200 chart in the United States and the sixth consecutive in the UK Albums Chart, both peaking at number ten. The album managed to peak at number one in Finland, making it the only album in Whitesnake's discography to ever top the chart. It managed to achieve platinum status by the Recording Industry Association of America (RIAA) in the US and gold by the British Phonographic Industry (BPI) in the UK and has sold over four million worldwide. Despite the considerable sales, it received mixed critical reception, with some reviewers praising Vai’s musicianship while others felt it diverged from the band's blues-based roots. The album spawned several singles: "Fool for Your Loving" (a re-recording of the band's 1980 hit), "The Deeper the Love," and "Now You're Gone"—all of which received substantial radio and MTV music video airplay. It was the final studio album to be released through Geffen as they were dropped from the label after the Greatest Hits tour by the end of 1994.

The album was supported by an extensive Liquor & Poker world tour, during which the band shared stages with acts such as Aerosmith and Bad English. Over the years, Slip of the Tongue has become a subject of debate among fans and critics alike, regarding over Coverdale's collaboration with Vai regarding their "radio-friendly" approach on sound. Lyrically, the album establishes to the band's usual trademark themes of passion, usage of sexual innuendos, and sensuality. Tracks like "The Deeper the Love" explore emotional intimacy and longing, while songs such as "Fool for Your Loving" and "Now You're Gone" reflect on romantic disillusionment and resilience.

== Background ==
After touring with their previous multi-platinum eponymous album in August 1988, guitarist Vivian Campbell was having problems with the band due to musical differences. According to David Coverdale, Campbell's wife had a "falling out" with Tawny Kitaen, who was Coverdale's fianceé at that time, causing tensions between the two. Originally, lead and primary guitarist, Adrian Vandenberg, had wanted to be the sole guitarist. This led to speculation, that he did not want Campbell in the band. However, that theory was debunked by Vandenberg's assertion that he had nothing to do with Campbell's departure and he confirmed that Coverdale's statements, about Campbell's dismissal were true. Coverdale then announced that the next supporting album, was going to be written by him and Vandenberg, who had established a fruitful working relationship, at that time.

== Songwriting and production ==
Singer David Coverdale and guitarist Adrian Vandenberg began assembling the album Slip of the Tongue at Lake Tahoe utilizing material, including the title track, written while on tour and lyrics previously composed by Coverdale in Bora Bora. After approximately a month of writing, the band regrouped for three weeks of rehearsals. Campbell departed a short time later, in December 1988.

The band originally planned to work on the album with producer Bruce Fairbairn in Vancouver; this did not materialise, however, due to scheduling difficulties. Instead, producers Mike Clink and Keith Olsen were hired; Clink recorded the basic tracks while Olsen did the overdubs including vocals and keyboards.

Adrian Vandenberg had planned to record for the album, but the worsening of an existing injury made it painful for him to play, requiring surgery. Thus, they wound up recording basic rhythm tracks with session guitarist Kevin Russell as a stand-in for Vandenberg. Eventually, Coverdale chose ex-Frank Zappa and David Lee Roth guitarist Steve Vai. Coverdale was unfamiliar with Vai's work with Zappa or Roth, but had seen him in the 1986 film Crossroads, in which Vai had greatly impressed him. At Vai's request, Coverdale gave him complete freedom over the guitar parts, which the former recorded at his home studio to the existing basic track tapes alongside producer Clink. Adrian Vandenberg revealed in several interviews that he thought Vai's flamboyant guitar playing was somewhat inappropriate, and that a more bluesy approach would have suited the album better. Vandenberg was credited as a major co-songwriter, while Vai was credited with "fulfilling all guitar responsibilities" on the album, and appeared in all the band's music videos. Vandenberg would not appear to play in any recording of Whitesnake albums, except "Here I Go Again", until his only appearance on the next release, 1997s Restless Heart.

Most of the backing vocals are by Tommy Funderburk and Mr. Mister lead singer Richard Page; Coverdale's friend and former Deep Purple bandmate Glenn Hughes, contributed backing vocals to three songs. Once again, keyboardist Don Airey, along with session musicians Claude Gaudette and David Rosenthal, was brought in to do some keyboard parts, but just like with Hughes, much of his material didn't make the final cut of the album. Out of the ten tracks in the album, nine were recorded in an analogue format while one was recorded digitally.

Shay Baby, who was credited as an assistant engineer, noted that the project "was just an incredible experience", and Coverdale "intended for it to be a reference point for a new decade, something truly great. We wanted a Sergeant Pep-per-type situation where we took care in making everything sound absolutely wonderful."

== Release and promotion ==
The album was hit by a majority of US-based radio stations leaking the album tracks before its intended release. In the late evening of 20 October, a local Santa Barbara radio contemporary station, KHTY, known as "Y97", obtained an unauthorised copy of Slip of the Tongue and broadcast it in its entirety. Reports claim that around 10:30 P.M, the station's disc jockey allegedly aired the full album with the intent of encouraging listeners "to get your [sic] tape recorders ready because KHTY had an exclusive and was about to play a hot new album." Geffen Records president, Eddie Rosenblatt, was at Santa Barbara and had heard KHTY's broadcast. Seven days later, a lawsuit was filed in the US District Court against the station and their owner, Pinnacle Communications, issuing a court order to prohibit them from playing all Warner Bros. Records-related releases prior to their release date and seeking at least $500,000 in damages. It was later revealed to be settled, but the label proceeded to continue with the lawsuit. KHTY's general manager, William Johnson Jr., claimed that they have received a copy from "an unknown source". At that time, the acting program director, Darren Stone "didn't understand" the consequences before playing an unauthorised release. In another incident, a Detroit AOR station WLLZ also illegally played a majority of tracks from the album, at the same time when KHTY was broadcasting the album, but no lawsuit was filed due to a lack of rival stations reporting the illegal broadcast.

Reports of the original release date were anticipated on 10 October 1989 but were moved to a month later. Slip of the Tongue was released on 7 November 1989 in the United States through Geffen Records, then was released internationally six days later through EMI. It later received a Japanese release on 18 November 1989 through CBS/Sony.

== Commercial performance ==
Reports of the album are predicted to sell high, but went below expectations. According to different sources, Slip of the Tongue had sold as far as 2.6 million by February 1990, or 4 million copies domestically, which was considered a commercial disappointment compared to the group's previous efforts. This was considerably lower than their effort of their previous release, which had sold more than 25 million. Commenting on this, Coverdale explained that he had years to write and experiment in peace before Whitesnake/1987, which were already all consistent in sales he was comfortable with, whereas Slip of the Tongue was written and recorded under greater pressure. He also blamed the album's lack of performance on radio and TV stations, saying they were "really dance-oriented at the moment", favouring artists like Janet Jackson, Paula Abdul, and Bobby Brown.

Slip of the Tongue debuted at number ten in their native UK Albums Chart and was certified silver by the British Phonographic Industry (BPI) within four days after its UK release, selling over 100,000 copies. This was the group's seventh top ten appearance in the chart. It ran for a consecutive eight weeks among its initial release, but eventually re-charted at number 67 at the beginning of September 1990 for another two weeks, which was attributed by the group's recent headline at the 1990 Monsters of Rock festival.

The album peaked at number ten on the US Billboard 200 chart and spent 34 weeks there. It was made as a US second top ten and the final album hit for the group. In Coverdale's account, the album shipped over 1.2 million copies within four days. Two months later, the Recording Industry Association of America (RIAA) certified Slip of the Tongue platinum on 17 January 1990, denoting more than 1 million units shipped. In Canada, Slip of the Tongue debuted at number 20 on the RPM chart, ultimately peaking at number 18, and staying on the charts for 33 weeks. In Japan, the album peaked at number 12 in Oricon Albums Chart and stayed on the charts for five weeks. Three years later, it certified gold by the (RIAJ) for shipments of 100,000 copies.

Across the pancontinental Europe, the album had similar successes to other countries, peaking at number 17. Among the Scandinavian market, the album fared very well in the region. In Finland, Slip of the Tongue reached at number one, which made the only album in the group's discography to ever chart there. In Norway, the album peaked at number nine. This was the group's highest peak position among their previous releases until their 2008 release Good to Be Bad peaked at number 5 in that country. In the Swedish Albums Chart, it reached number 11. On the Australian Albums Chart, it peaked at number 39. This was the group's third appearance but their second-peaking in that region since 1987, which reached number 23. In New Zealand, it performed poorly than their previous effort, which peaked at number two, only to be charting at number 35.

Within the 2019 reissue of Slip of the Tongue, it re-charted in the UK consecutively, at number seven on the Rock & Metal Albums chart, number 43 in Scotland, number 55 on Album Sales, and number 50 on Physical Albums. The reissue also reached number 41 in Oricon Albums Chart and number 73 on the Japanese Billboard chart. It peaked in Hungary at number nine. Combined since its 1989 release, the album charted in 18 countries.

== Singles ==
Three singles were spawned from the album. "Fool for Your Loving '89" was released in October 1989 while "The Deeper the Love" and "Now You're Gone" were released in 1990. "Judgement Day" did not receive a single release, rather, it was made solely as a radio airplay. The single B-Side of the album, "Sweet Lady Luck" was released in 1990, only to be re-released in 1994 for the Greatest Hits promotion.

Slip of the Tongue received a reissue in May 2009 as a two-disc remastered version with a slightly modified running order and ten bonus tracks to commemorate its 20th anniversary through EMI and Geffen. Despite UMG having Whitesnake listed as one of the artists to have their multi-track masters lost in a 2008 Universal Studios fire, specifically Geffen material, it was revealed that it was found safe at the Iron Mountain Storage Facility in Pennsylvania. Rhino Entertainment released a separate CD version of the 2009 reissue, after Whitesnake was signed to the Rhino catalogue for reissues in 2017. The album later an expanded reissue by Rhino in October 2019, including a newly remastered version of the album as well as other recordings and videos, including a re-sequenced tracklist. "Sweet Lady Luck" received a promotional video release before the album's second reissue.

On 25 June 2026, Craft Recordings announced its vinyl counterpart reissue along with Slide It In and Whitesnake, which is set to be released on 18 September.

== Touring ==
The Liquor & Poker world tour for the album was the biggest the band had undertaken yet, including their third appearance & second headlining of the famous Castle Donington Monsters of Rock festival on 18 August 1990. The performance was later released as Live at Donington 1990 on 20 May 2011 on Frontiers. The band embarked on the tour at Fairfax Patriot Center (later named EagleBank Arena), Fairfax, Virginia on 2 February 1990. The tour came to an end on 26 September 1990, at Nippon Budokan, Tokyo, Japan, at which point Coverdale have given notice to his band members two or three days before the tour launched, to consider putting the band on hold. When the news broke, many of the members knew the era of the group was ending.

Coverdale suffered from disillusionment with the band's glam metal image and the current divorce proceedings from Kitaen. After the last leg of the tour, "I gave all my stage clothes to Cathy, my wardrobe assistant, and said: "Burn 'em, get rid of 'em, I'm done," which marked his final performance at that time. He commented that he was not enjoying much of the clout he received despite the ongoing success of the group, commenting, "Is this still fulfilling to me? Is this what I want to do?"

Whitesnake was disbanded indefinitely and became out of the public eye for three years. Coverdale became reclusive after the disbandment and resurfaced in the following year. At this point, he collaborated with Jimmy Page, which resulted in the album Coverdale–Page, released in 1993.

== Critical reception ==
Professional ratings
Review scores
| Source | Rating |
|---|---|
| AllMusic | 3/5 stars |
| Christgau's Record Guide | D |
| Collector's Guide to Heavy Metal | 7/10 |
| MusicHound Rock | 1.5/5 stars |
| New Musical Express | 4/10 |
| Rock Hard | 8/10 |
| Rolling Stone | 2/5 stars |

Unlike the band's previous album, which received widespread critical acclaim, Slip of the Tongue was met with mixed reactions, with many saying the album's sound was too far from the original Whitesnake sound. Mainly, musical outlets and magazines questioned the collaboration of Coverdale and Vai, raising doubts about the band's longevity and the musical style the band was fit for.

Robert Christgau gave the album a negative review, saying: "They got lucky, and they don't intend to let go. With fast-gun-for-hire Steve Vai operating all guitars and who knows what other geegaws, they've consolidated their sound into essence of arena: all pomp, flash, male posturing, and sentimentality, this is now the Worst Band in the World. So you just move over, Journey."

Kim Neelt, writing for Rolling Stone, called the album out as "not passionate enough to evoke pleasure" and "dull" as it can be. Understanding the album's context across tracks like Now You're Gone being compared to Flashdance, she questioned the reactions by summing out the rest of nothing "heartfelt" or "a tad too radio-friendly". Furthermore, she negatively slammed Vai about fulfilling the guitar arrangements from Vandenberg responding that Vai "couldn't step into the spotlight and sparkle without leaving his shoes behind." Admitting that the album has "its moments," she ended her commentary on the record saying that it "won't leave you feeling exhilarated, and it won't leave you feeling disgusted."

David Coverdale himself, also saw the album as one of the weakest in the band's catalogue, but has since, found somewhat of an appreciation for it. He summed up his feelings by saying:

For a long time, I felt the album lacked a certain Whitesnake feel in the music, but, countless people thro' the years have assured me that they enjoyed and enjoy the album, nonetheless. So, now I happily accept it as a significant part of the Whitesnake catalogue and to be honest, I enjoy it more now than I did back then. It was an album plagued with challenges and obstacles for me, personally, from many avenues, but hey...nobody said being successful is supposed to be easy!

Metal Rules ranked the album #38 on their list of the Top 50 Glam Metal Albums.

Billboard named the 2019 reissue at number 9 as one of the best reissues of that year.

== Composition and lyrics ==
Accessing the album's Coverdale revealed the opening track for Slip of the Tongue was originally titled, "Dominatrix Blues."

To speak about how the title got changed and came through its main idea for the title of the record, David Coverdale stated:

"I think the first time that Adrian and I sat down, all we did is we looked at what we felt, Whitesnake was missing, in terms of tempos and styles. Adrian was a "snake" fan and has been from the beginning, his finger on the pulse of what Whitesnake was about [...] we needed an "a hundred miles an hour" track, you know for the live show. The idea of the lyric is this very powerful woman instead of the man being, all that butch stuff that usually hard rock and heavy metal purports to be. This is the women is stronger, they fare very well on this album."

=== Cheap an' Nasty ===
Coverdale then talks behind the meaning of Cheap an' Nasty saying:

"'Cheap an' Nasty' was a kind of marriage of Slide It In & "Slow Poke Music", a very sexy little piece of Whitesnake stuff I think, and that's one of the major tongue-in-cheek. [...] We've been coming off very strong, very positively, it's a very optimistic & positive album, even the blues is temperate (moderate) in the dark, darker side."

He then mentioned that it was Kitaen's favorite track on the album.

=== Fool for Your Loving ===
In retrospect of the re-recording for Fool for Your Loving, according to the 20th-anniversary liner notes of the album, Coverdale comments:

"I was mortified when I allowed myself to be talked into letting Geffen release the re-recorded version of "Fool for Your Loving", instead of "Judgement Day" as the first one out of the box to promote the album... I knew radio would be all over "Judgement Day" just from the market research we did back then... but, Kalodner, Rosenblatt, Marco Babineau, my manager and some of our radio people, all people whose opinions I trusted, came down to the Record Plant when I was finishing off the album and all confronted me with what they felt was the way to go... that it would be a mistake to go with Judgement Day... Not only I but the band were really upset about that decision... I've regretted it ever since... I have no doubt it was Kalodner's idea, thinking we could achieve the same as we'd had with the re-recorded "Here I Go Again"... Anyway...they were wrong and so was I to go along with it... Another hard lesson learned... Stick to your guns if you believe in it...It's the only way..."

David Coverdale revealed that the band did attempt to re-visit some of the older tracks in the Whitesnake discography, such as "Ain't Gonna Cry No More" (from Ready an' Willing), "We Wish You Well" (from Lovehunter), and "Burning Heart" (from Vandenberg's eponymous album). Given how the original "Fool for Your Loving" was given for, he commented:

"'Fool for Your Loving' was originally written for B. B. King when he was working with "The Crusaders." [...] You have the band cut the demo, I was sitting there listening to it again, and I said, "Oh, just a second, can you try that again and crunch the guitars a little more?" And I went, "I think we should hang on to this," and that became our first international hit."

Coverdale then expressed how he believed his performance on the original version of "Fool for Your Loving" was botched saying, "I always do my best writing songs, but then it's up to my colleagues to put the passion that the song deserves. It is a passionate song... if you listen to the original, I think the only security other than the song itself is my vocal performance... It's a very secure blues performance... but it's very bottom-light in terms of presentation and totally top-heavy, musically. There isn't the passion, the song is not given the passionate performance that it deserved, the same of "Here I Go Again" (the original 1982 version)." The same thing would apply to the past early-80s Whitesnake albums as it was written in the best that Coverdale was in that position but blatantly set lacking the passion and performance of the rest of the songs. Coverdale further said, "I honestly cannot understand how I accepted those, that particular takes, that particular performance [...] it's like overcompensating because Ian didn't play as powerfully as I know he can, maybe he had something else the track on his mind that day, you know [...] it's simply isn't good enough." He affirmed that he would plan to re-record older songs for the next upcoming Greatest Hits compilation album, but neither of these came out, with only the compilation under that "Greatest Hits" name that featured the tracks from the mid-80s released in 1994.

=== Now You're Gone ===
Coverdale claimed that he was satisfied with the track, Now You're Gone whisper-to-a-scream methodology part. Stating on how it was written, he said:

"That's putting myself in a situation looking if I lost this most precious woman in my life, how I would feel, because you usually blow perfect relationships by being stupid."

=== Kitten's Got Claws ===
On the track Kitten's Got Claws, he asserted that the song was the easiest song to sing from the album. In addition, he mentioned that the song was written for Tawny, referring to her last name calling as a "kitten." Furthermore, Coverdale spoke about its meaning, saying:

"The closest I've come to what I've think to that wonderful Chuck Berry style lyric when there's a continuing story. I love the "G-String tuned to A," and Vai just plays magnificently, it's such a signature performance. I think from beginning to end, it sounds like I'm working with a dozen alley cats, even the solo is got a whining-cat-a-alike [...] I really enjoyed that."

=== Wings of the Storm ===
Coverdale then talks about the meaning of Wings of the Storm, saying:

"I like the theme, it is a love song, but it's very optimistic. You've got the situation, now it's up to you to keep it together. If you check the lyrics:

On and on, the road goes on
And it'll go on forever
The time will show, if you and I
Will walk that road together
[...]
Heaven above us and hell below

It's all of these problems, it's when anybody sees what it looks to be a perfect relationship, they do their utmost to destroy it, and if you stick together on it, the world can come against you, and you'll be able to fight it off. But it's divided in conquer if you're not careful. [...] Some gentleman or some woman [...] it's nothing is gonna stop you being electrically charged by seeing somebody that you feel is attractive. But, you have to wave in one hand, what that particular exchange is gonna do for you, what it's worth, and how much do you stand to lose when your relationship in the other hand. And if you stand back and take that kind of perspective, I think fidelity will win."

=== The Deeper the Love ===
Coverdale further states how The Deeper the Love was written, saying:

"It's the closest we've got to a solo R&B song. It's once again it's optimistic, it's positive, it's like look and know, I've been questionable in my past, but I've taken it all into stock and I'm glad you've stuck around, because now... I'm gonna give it my best shot, and thanks for hanging in there, I'm sorry I'm stupid at this particular time. It's gonna be the notice at the end of our love."

To explain further, Coverdale commented on the origins of the song in the 20th-anniversary edition liner notes by saying:

"'The Deeper the Love' came from a chorus sequence I'd had for some time, written, if memory serves, in my dear friend Tony Z's house, many years ago... then my little Dutch brother, Adrian, came along and put the musical icing on the cake, and gave me the verse chord sequence. I finished writing it in Tahiti [...] very early in the morning with the sun rising over the Pacific."

=== Judgement Day ===
Coverdale stated that Judgement Day was both a jab at Robert Plant and a "Percodan riff." He had had back surgery in April 1988 due to a herniated disc that had to be removed caused by intensive stage performances he had encountered throughout the years. He was given Percodan to relieve the pain.

=== Slow Poke Music ===
Coverdale talks about the meaning of Slow Poke Music, stating:

"If you look back into David Coverdale's "Whitesnake" the very first solo album I did, you'll see "S.P. Music" on my publishing credits, which was actually "Slow Poke Music," but I had somebody who was in control of the Deep Purple company at that time who was a little too modest and thought it was too risqué, so he made it sound like it was a petroleum company. [...] It's the closest that I've come to a Hendrix style song."

=== Sailing Ships ===
To conclude the interview, Coverdale talked about the meaning of Sailing Ships, stating:

"It's a message from me to all of you, to everybody. [...] That's your ambition. That is your fantasy. It's up to you to exercise that. Everybody has so many walls them because of this ridiculous society that we live in, y'know, you must express yourself, you have to, 'cause nobody's gonna do it for you. [...] It's like a graduation of life, someone you leave school, the ocean of the song... is life, it's your life. [...] I feel exactly the way that you do, and I found my discovery is that nobody is gonna realize my fantasies or ambitions for me, that's why I'm so ruthless on myself to do that. In the fine analysis, you're on your own, but you're actually not, a lot of people won't own up that they're in the same boat, because of whatever ridiculous mental mind games they're going through."

== Track listings ==
All tracks are written by David Coverdale and Adrian Vandenberg, except where noted.

| No. | Title | Length |
|---|---|---|
| 1. | "Slip of the Tongue" | 5:20 |
| 2. | "Cheap an' Nasty" | 3:28 |
| 3. | "Fool for Your Loving '89" (Coverdale, Bernie Marsden, Micky Moody) | 4:10 |
| 4. | "Now You're Gone" | 4:11 |
| 5. | "Kittens Got Claws" | 5:00 |
| 6. | "Wings of the Storm" | 5:00 |
| 7. | "The Deeper the Love" | 4:22 |
| 8. | "Judgement Day" | 5:15 |
| 9. | "Slow Poke Music" | 3:59 |
| 10. | "Sailing Ships" | 6:02 |

20th Anniversary Edition bonus tracks
| No. | Title | Length |
|---|---|---|
| 11. | "Sweet Lady Luck" (Single B-side) | 4:37 |
| 12. | "Now You're Gone" (US Single Remix) | 4:07 |
| 13. | "Fool for Your Loving" (Vai Voltage Mix) | 4:17 |
| 14. | "Judgement Day" (from Live: In the Shadow of the Blues) | 5:38 |
| 15. | "Slip of the Tongue" (from Live at Donington 1990) | 5:41 |
| 16. | "Kittens Got Claws" (from Live at Donington 1990) | 4:58 |
| Total length: | | 76:05 |

20th Anniversary Edition DVD
| No. | Title | Length |
|---|---|---|
| 1. | "Fool for Your Loving '89" (Music video) | 4:27 |
| 2. | "Now You're Gone" (Music video) | 4:09 |
| 3. | "The Deeper the Love" (Music video) | 4:17 |
| 4. | "The Deeper the Love" (live, from Starkers in Tokyo) | 4:02 |
| 5. | "Sailing Ships" (live, from Starkers in Tokyo) | 4:06 |
| 6. | "Judgement Day" (from Live... In the Still of the Night) | 5:22 |
| 7. | "Slip of the Tongue" (from Live at Donington 1990) | 5:54 |
| 8. | "Kittens Got Claws" (from Live at Donington 1990) | 5:01 |
| Total length: | | 37:18 |

30th Anniversary Remaster
| No. | Title | Length |
|---|---|---|
| 1. | "Slip of the Tongue" | 5:21 |
| 2. | "Kitten's Got Claws" | 4:46 |
| 3. | "Cheap an' Nasty" | 3:27 |
| 4. | "Now You're Gone" | 4:10 |
| 5. | "The Deeper the Love" | 4:19 |
| 6. | "Judgement Day" | 5:16 |
| 7. | "Sailing Ships" | 5:58 |
| 8. | "Wings of the Storm" | 5:00 |
| 9. | "Slow Poke Music" | 3:57 |
| 10. | "Fool for Your Loving" | 4:10 |
| 11. | "Sweet Lady Luck" (Single B-Side) | 4:33 |
| 12. | "Now You're Gone" (Chris Lord-Alge Single Remix) | 4:06 |
| 13. | "Fool for Your Loving" (Vai Voltage Mix) | 4:18 |
| 14. | "Slip of the Tongue" (Alternate Intro & Breakdown) | 4:52 |
| 15. | "Cheap an' Nasty" (Alternate Solo & End) | 3:34 |
| 16. | "Judgement Day" (Alternate & Extended Solos) | 5:31 |
| 17. | "Fool for Your Loving" (Alternate AOR Mix with CHR Intro) | 4:11 |
| Total length: | | 74:49 |

== Personnel ==
Credits are adapted from the album's liner notes. For further DVD reissue credits, see Live at Donington 1990.

Whitesnake

- David Coverdale — vocals
- Steve Vai — guitar
- Rudy Sarzo — bass
- Tommy Aldridge — drums
- Adrian Vandenberg — guitar writing arrangements (credited but not recorded)

Additional musicians

- Don Airey — keyboards
- David Rosenthal — keyboards
- Claude Gaudette — keyboards
- Alan Pasqua — keyboards (3)
- Glenn Hughes — backing vocals
- Tommy Funderburk — backing vocals
- Richard Page — backing vocals

Technical

- Mike Clink — producer, engineer, mixing (at Record Plant Studios)
- Keith Olsen — producer, engineer, mixing (at Record Plant Studios)
- Greg Fulginiti — mastering (at Artisan Sound Recorders)
- Noel Golden — assistant engineer
- Gordon Fordyce — assistant engineer
- Shay Baby — assistant engineer
- Allen Abrahamson — assistant engineer
- Chris Lord-Alge — mixing (Now You're Gone) (US Remix)

Design

- Hugh Syme — art direction, emblem design, cover concept development

Other

- Marty Callner — video director (Fool for Your Loving '89, The Deeper the Love)
- "Cream Cheese" — producer (Fool for Your Loving '89, The Deeper the Love)
- Wayne Isham — video director, producer (Now You're Gone)
- Gene Kirkland — photography
- Neil Zlozower — photography
- Hugh Gilmour — photography
- Greg Gorman — photography

Reissue (2009)

- David Coverdale — executive producer
- Dave Donnelly — remastering (at DNA Mastering, Los Angeles)
- Hugh Gilmour — reissue artwork
- David Coverdale — mixing (Live at Donington 1990)
- Doug Aldrich — mixing (Live at Donington 1990)
- Michael McIntyre — mixing (Live at Donington 1990)
- Bjorn Thorsrud — mixing (Live at Donington 1990)

Reissue (2009 cont.)

- CYNJAS Film — DVD production
- Editgods LA — DVD production
- Meedja — DVD production
- Hamish Hamilton — "Judgment Day" video director
- Daniel E. Catullo III — DVD executive producer — (Live... in the Still of the Night)
- Tilton Gardener — co-executive producer (Live... in the Still of the Night)
- Robert McClaughtery — co-executive producer (Live... in the Still of the Night)
- Shelly Singhal — co-executive producer (Live... in the Still of the Night)
- John X. Volatis — audio mixing (Live... in the Still of the Night)
- "A Charming English Chap in A Truck" — video producer, director (Live at Donington 1990)

Reissue (2009 cont.)

- Devin Dahaven — DVD editor
- Tony Minter — DVD editor
- Armando Contreras — assistant DVD editor
- David Masters — slideshow production
- Jon Farrell — DVD menu animation
- Michael Magallon — DVD author
- Ralph Fitzgerald — photographer

Reissue (2019)

- David Coverdale — executive producer
- Michael McIntyre — producer
- Tom Gordon — producer, project coordination, audio restoration
- Hugh Gilmour — A&R, reissue, package design
- Jeremiah Luke Wynn — second engineer
- John Bernhard — second engineer
- Scott Hull — remastering (at Masterdisk; Peekskill, NY)
- Brian Godd — product manager
- Ellys Airey — production, packaging manager
- Phil Easton — interviewer (recorded in 1989 The Wagging Tongue Edition)
- Purplesnake — music video (Sweet Lady Luck)

== Charts ==
| Chart (1989–1990) | Peak position |
|---|---|
| Australian Albums (ARIA) | 39 |
| Austrian Albums (Ö3 Austria) | 29 |
| Canada Top Albums/CDs (RPM) | 18 |
| European Albums (Top 100) | 17 |
| Dutch Albums (Album Top 100) | 43 |
| Finnish Albums (The Official Finnish Charts) | 1 |
| German Albums (Offizielle Top 100) | 19 |
| Japanese Albums (Oricon) | 12 |
| New Zealand Albums (RMNZ) | 35 |
| Norwegian Albums (VG-lista) | 9 |
| Swedish Albums (Sverigetopplistan) | 11 |
| Swiss Albums (Schweizer Hitparade) | 11 |
| UK Albums (Official Charts) | 10 |
| US Billboard 200 | 10 |

| Chart (2015) | Peak position |
|---|---|
| Spanish Albums (Promusicae) | 99 |

| Chart (2019) | Peak position |
|---|---|
| Belgian Albums (Ultratop Wallonia) | 91 |
| French Albums (SNEP) | 220 |
| Hungarian Albums (MAHASZ) | 9 |
| Japanese Albums (Oricon) | 41 |
| Japanese Hot Albums (Billboard Japan) | 73 |
| Scottish Albums (Official Charts) | 43 |
| Spanish Albums (Promusicae) | 50 |
| UK Rock & Metal Albums (Official Charts) | 7 |

== Certifications ==
| Region | Certification | Certified units/sales |
|---|---|---|
| Japan (RIAJ) | Gold | 100,000^{^} |
| United Kingdom (BPI) | Gold | 100,000^{^} |
| United States (RIAA) | Platinum | 1,200,000 |
Summaries
| Worldwide | — | 4,000,000 |
^{^} Shipments figures based on certification alone.
