= Now You're Gone (Whitesnake song) =

Single by Whitesnake

from the album Slip of the Tongue
- B-side: "Wings of the Storm"
- Released: 21 May 1990 (US/Japan); 13 August 1990 (UK)
- Genre: Hard rock; glam metal
- Length: 4:12
- Label: EMI
- Songwriters: David Coverdale, Adrian Vandenberg
- Producers: Mike Clink & Keith Olsen

Whitesnake singles chronology
"The Deeper the Love" (1990)	"Now You're Gone" (1990)	"Too Many Tears" (1997)

Music video
- "Now You're Gone" on YouTube

"Now You're Gone" is a song by the British-American rock band Whitesnake from their 1989 album Slip of the Tongue. It was written by singer David Coverdale and guitarist Adrian Vandenberg. The power ballad follows an alternately slow/fast-paced rhythm, and the lyrics tell about longing for the woman after a break-up.

"Now You're Gone" was released as the third and final single from Slip of the Tongue, remixed by Chris Lord-Alge. While it was a Top 40 chart success in the UK, it barely made it onto Billboard Hot 100 in the US.

== Music video ==
A music video was shot in 1990 in the afternoon before and during a live show in Philadelphia to promote the single. The video was directed by Wayne Isham and features the band playing the song on stage, with footage of the fans interspersed with shots from the concert. In the booklet of the 20th anniversary edition of Slip of the Tongue, David Coverdale commented:

"I remember shooting the video with Wayne Isham in front of a sold out crowd at the Spectrum in Philadelphia, unfortunately it received minimal airplay as MTV was changing its format... still, I think it's one of the best videos we've done..."

== Track listing ==
All tracks written by David Coverdale and Adrian Vandenberg.

- 7"/Cassette Single

A. "Now You're Gone" (Remix) – 4:12
B. "Wings of the Storm" (L.P. Version) – 5:00

- 12" Single

A. "Now You're Gone" (Remix) – 4:12
B1. "Kittens Got Claws" (L.P. Version) – 5:01
B1. "Cheap an' Nasty" (L.P. Version) – 3:29

- CD Single
1. "Now You're Gone" (Remix) – 4:15
2. "Wings of the Storm" (L.P. Version) – 5:03
3. "Kittens Got Claws" (L.P. Version) – 5:02
4. "Cheap an' Nasty" (L.P. Version) – 3:29

== Personnel ==
- David Coverdale – lead vocals
- Steve Vai – guitars
- Adrian Vandenberg – guitars (credited, but does not actually appear)
- Rudy Sarzo – bass guitar
- Tommy Aldridge – drums

== Charts ==
Chart (1990–91)	Peak position
Europe (Eurochart Hot 100)	82
UK Singles (OCC)	31
US Billboard Top 100	96
US Mainstream Rock (Billboard)	15
