= Starkers in Tokyo =

1997 live album by Whitesnake

Live album by Whitesnake
- Released: 10 September 1997
- Recorded: 5 July 1997
- Studios: Toshiba EMI #3 Studio, Tokyo
- Genre: Acoustic rock
- Length: 40:14
- Labels: EMI/Toshiba; Rhino (2018 "Unzipped" reissue)
- Producer: David Coverdale

Whitesnake chronology
Restless Heart (1997)	Starkers in Tokyo (1997)	20th Century Masters – The Millennium Collection: The Best of Whitesnake (2000)

Starkers in Tokyo

Video by Whitesnake
- Released: 10 September 1997
- Recorded: 5 July 1997
- Studios: Toshiba EMI #3 Studio, Tokyo
- Genre: Acoustic rock
- Length: 50 min.
- Label: Toshiba EMI
- Producer: David Coverdale

Whitesnake video albums chronology
Trilogy (1988)	Starkers in Tokyo (1997)	Live... In the Still of the Night (2006)

Professional ratings
Review scores
Source	Rating
AllMusic	3/5 stars

Starkers in Tokyo is a live acoustic album and video recording by British-American rock band Whitesnake, released only in Japan on 10 September 1997. It is performed in the style of the Unplugged series and simply features David Coverdale on vocals and Adrian Vandenberg on acoustic guitar.

The performance was recorded at the EMI studios in Japan for a small audience of fans in support of then most recent album Restless Heart. This recording was also released on VHS and Laserdisc in Japan only. The album was recorded on 5 July 1997 at night, and then mixed the following day at Toshiba EMI studios. This CD was released outside Japan almost a year later in June 1998.

The album includes an acoustic version of Whitesnake's biggest hit "Here I Go Again" among others.

The live album subsequently appeared on the second disc of Whitesnake's 2018 acoustic collection, Unzipped, while the video recording is remixed in "5.1 and stereo" and released on collection's DVD.

== Track listing ==
1. "Sailing Ships" (David Coverdale, Adrian Vandenberg) – 4:37
2. "Too Many Tears" (Coverdale, Vandenberg) – 4:13
3. "The Deeper the Love" (Coverdale, Vandenberg) – 4:09
4. "Love Ain't No Stranger" (Coverdale, Mel Galley) – 3:15
5. "Can't Go On" (Coverdale, Vandenberg) – 3:50
6. "Give Me All Your Love" (Coverdale, John Sykes) – 3:21
7. "Don't Fade Away" (Coverdale, Vandenberg) – 4:26
8. "Is This Love" (Coverdale, Sykes) – 3:09
9. "Here I Go Again" (Coverdale, Bernie Marsden) – 4:46
10. "Soldier of Fortune" (Coverdale, Ritchie Blackmore) – 4:22

== Track listing DVD version ==
1. "Sailing Ships" (David Coverdale, Adrian Vandenberg) – 4:37
2. "Too Many Tears" (Coverdale, Vandenberg) – 4:13
3. "The Deeper the Love" (Coverdale, Vandenberg) – 4:09
4. "Can't Go On" (Coverdale, Vandenberg) – 3:50
5. "Is This Love" (Coverdale, Sykes) – 3:09
6. "Give Me All Your Love" (Coverdale, John Sykes) – 3:21
7. "Here I Go Again" (Coverdale, Bernie Marsden) – 4:46
8. "Soldier of Fortune" (Coverdale, Ritchie Blackmore) – 4:22
9. "Love Ain't No Stranger" (Coverdale, Mel Galley) – 3:15
10. "Don't Fade Away" (Coverdale, Vandenberg) – 4:26

== Songs left off the album ==
- "Burning Heart" (Vandenberg)
- "Fool for Your Loving" (Coverdale, Micky Moody, Marsden)
- "Only My Soul" (Coverdale)

The songs "Only My Soul" and "Fool for Your Loving" appears on the 2018 acoustic compilation album, Unzipped, leaving out "Burning Heart" as the only track to be left off from the whole album.

== Personnel ==
Credits are adapted from the album's liner notes.

Whitesnake

- David Coverdale - vocals
- Adrian Vandenberg - acoustic guitar

Technical

- Masuzo "Masu" Iida — recording, mixing
- Kazuaki "Kazu" Fujita — engineering
- Katsumi "Katsu" Kawakita — assisted engineering, recording, mixing

Design

- David Coverdale — cover concept
- Adrian Vandenberg — cover concept
- Shinsuke Suda — art direction & design
- Yuri Tamura — art direction & design
- Hiro Ito — photography
- Koichiro Hiki — photography
- Hiro Ito — cover photo
- Toshinao Nakamura — lighting

Management

- David Coverdale — producer
- Takahiro Sugiyama — production coordination
- Myles Keller — production coordination
- Michael McIntyre — production coordination
- Bjorn "Berserk" Thorsud — post-production assisting
- Takashi "Matsu" Matsumura — studio coordination
- Masako Kawahara — interpreting
- Yumi Kubota — hair, makeup

== Charts ==
Chart (1997)	Peak position
Japanese Albums (Oricon)	16
