= The Deeper the Love =

Single by Whitesnake

from the album Slip of the Tongue
- B-side: "Slip of the Tongue" (US) "Judgement Day" (UK)
- Released: 26 February 1990
- Recorded: 1989
- Genre: Hard rock; glam metal
- Length: 4:23
- Label: EMI, Geffen
- Songwriters: David Coverdale, Adrian Vandenberg
- Producers: Mike Clink, Keith Olsen

Whitesnake singles chronology
"Fool for Your Loving" (1989)	"The Deeper the Love" (1990)	"Now You're Gone" (1990)

Music video
- "The Deeper the Love" on YouTube

"The Deeper the Love" is a power ballad by British-American rock band Whitesnake, taken from their 1989 album Slip of the Tongue. It was written by singer David Coverdale, along with guitarist Adrian Vandenberg.

== Overview ==
Coverdale commented on the origins of the song in Slip of the Tongue 20th anniversary edition liner notes by saying:

"The Deeper the Love" came from a chorus sequence I'd had for some time, written, if memory serves, in my dear friend Tony Z's house, many years ago... then my little Dutch brother, Adrian, came along and put the musical icing on the cake, and gave me the verse chord sequence. I finished writing it in Tahiti [...] very early in the morning with the sun rising over the Pacific.

"The Deeper the Love" was released as the album's second single in early 1990. It was a Top 40 chart success in the UK, the US, Canada and Ireland. It also reached number 4 on the Mainstream Rock Tracks charts in the US.

The song was performed in its original form for the 1990 Slip of the Tongue tour, but after that it has only been performed in acoustic form, which was first seen and heard on 1998's Starkers in Tokyo.

== Music video ==
The music video for "The Deeper the Love" was directed by Marty Callner. It features the band performing on a large stage, with big headlights that also have the Slip of the Tongue album cover on them. There are also scenes of David Coverdale in a hallway that also have walls covered with Slip of the Tongue's cover, and Adrian Vandenberg playing the piano on a stairwell. The video features David Coverdale's then-wife, actress Tawny Kitaen, who has also appeared in the music videos for "Is This Love", "Here I Go Again '87" and "Still of the Night", all from the band's previous album.

== Track listing ==
All tracks written by David Coverdale and Adrian Vandenberg, except where noted.

- US 7" Single and Cassette Single

A. "The Deeper the Love" – 4:23
B. "Slip of the Tongue" – 5:20

- UK 7" Single

A. "The Deeper the Love" – 4:23
B. "Judgement Day" – 5:15

- UK 12" Single

A. "The Deeper the Love" – 4:23
B1. "Judgement Day" – 5:15
B1. "Sweet Lady Luck" – 4:37

- UK CD Single
1. "The Deeper the Love" – 4:19
2. "Judgement Day" – 5:10
3. "Sweet Lady Luck" – 4:35
4. "Fool for Your Loving" (Coverdale, Micky Moody, Bernie Marsden) – 4:21

== Personnel ==
- David Coverdale – lead vocals
- Steve Vai – guitars
- Adrian Vandenberg – guitars (credited, but does not actually appear)
- Rudy Sarzo – bass guitar
- Tommy Aldridge – drums
- Don Airey – keyboards

== Charts ==
Chart (1990–91)	Peak position
Canadian Singles Chart (RPM)	36
Irish Singles Chart (IRMA)	30
UK Singles Chart (OCC)	35
US Hot 100 (Billboard)	28
US Mainstream Rock (Billboard)	4

== Release history ==
Release formats for The Deeper the Love
Region	Date	Label	Format	Ref.
US	January 1990	Geffen Records	7-inch vinyl; Cassette; CD	
Japan	21 February 1990	CBS/Sony	Mini-CD	
UK	26 February 1990	EMI	CD; 7-inch vinyl; 7-inch picture disc vinyl; 7-inch white vinyl; Cassette	
