= Ready an' Willing =

Studio album by Whitesnake
- Released: 23 May 1980
- Recorded: December 1979; February 1980
- Studio: Ridge Farm Studios; Rusper & Central Recorders Studio & Sauna (London)
- Genre: Hard rock; blues rock
- Length: 40:00
- Label: Mirage/Atlantic (North America) Polydor (Japan) United Artists/Sunburst (Rest of the World) EMI (UK reissue)
- Producer: Martin Birch

Whitesnake chronology
| Lovehunter (1979) | Ready an' Willing (1980) | Live... in the Heart of the City (1980) |

Singles from Ready an' Willing
- 1. "Fool for Your Loving" Released: 11 April 1980; 2. "Ready an' Willing" Released: 20 June 1980; 3. "Sweet Talker" Released: October 1980 (US)

Professional ratings
Review scores
| Source | Rating |
|---|---|
| AllMusic | 3/5 stars |
| Collector's Guide to Heavy Metal | 9/10 |

Ready an' Willing is the third studio album by British rock band Whitesnake, released on 23 May 1980, and 14 July in the US. It was the group's first album to feature drummer Ian Paice, a former bandmate of singer David Coverdale and keyboardist Jon Lord in Deep Purple. It peaked at No. 6 on the UK Albums Chart, it was also the band's first to chart outside of the UK, reaching No. 32 in Norway and No. 90 in the US.

== Release ==
The album featured two of the band's UK single-hits from that year: "Fool for Your Loving" had reached No. 13 in the charts on 26 April 1980, and the title-track, "Ready an' Willing (Sweet Satisfaction)" made No. 43 in July of the same year. On 2 August 1980 "Fool for Your Loving" peaked at No. 53 on the Billboard Hot 100; the song would later be re-recorded for the Slip of the Tongue album. The track "Blindman", initially from David Coverdale's first solo album White Snake, was re-recorded for this album.

== Track listing ==
Side one
| No. | Title | Writer(s) | Length |
|---|---|---|---|
| 1. | "Fool for Your Loving" | David Coverdale, Micky Moody, Bernie Marsden | 4:17 |
| 2. | "Sweet Talker" | Coverdale, Marsden | 3:38 |
| 3. | "Ready an' Willing" | Coverdale, Moody, Marsden, Neil Murray, Jon Lord, Ian Paice | 3:44 |
| 4. | "Carry Your Load" | Coverdale | 4:06 |
| 5. | "Blindman" | Coverdale | 5:09 |

Side two
| No. | Title | Writer(s) | Length |
|---|---|---|---|
| 6. | "Ain't Gonna Cry No More" | Coverdale, Moody | 5:52 |
| 7. | "Love Man" | Coverdale | 5:04 |
| 8. | "Black and Blue" | Coverdale, Moody | 4:06 |
| 9. | "She's a Woman" | Coverdale, Marsden | 4:07 |

2006 Remastered Edition bonus tracks
| No. | Title | Writer(s) | Length |
|---|---|---|---|
| 10. | "Love for Sale" | Coverdale | 3:05 |
| 11. | "Ain't No Love in the Heart of the City" (Live at the Reading Festival 1979) | Michael Price, Dan Walsh | 6:54 |
| 12. | "Mistreated" (Live at the Reading Festival 1979) | Coverdale, Ritchie Blackmore | 13:30 |
| 13. | "Love Hunter" (Live at the Reading Festival 1979) | Coverdale, Moody, Marsden | 5:56 |
| 14. | "Breakdown" (Live at the Reading Festival 1979) | Coverdale, Moody | 5:38 |

== Personnel ==
Credits are adapted from the album's liner notes.

Whitesnake

- David Coverdale – vocals
- Micky Moody – guitars, backing vocals
- Bernie Marsden – guitars, backing vocals
- Neil Murray – bass
- Ian Paice – drums
- Jon Lord – keyboards

Technical

- Martin Birch – producer, engineer, mixing

Design

- David Coverdale – original sleeve concept
- George Bodnar – inner sleeve photography

Reissue

- Geoff Barton – sleeve notes
- Jo Brooks & Libby Jones – album project coordination
- Hugh Gilmour – artwork (remastered)
- Peter Mew – remastering (at Abbey Road Studios, London)

== Charts ==
| Chart (1980) | Peak position |
|---|---|
| Norwegian Albums (VG-lista) | 32 |
| UK Albums (Official Charts) | 6 |
| US Billboard 200 | 90 |

| Chart (2006) | Peak position |
|---|---|
| Japanese Albums (Oricon) | 160 |

== Certifications ==
| Region | Certification | Certified units/sales |
|---|---|---|
| United Kingdom (BPI) | Gold | 100,000^{^} |
^{^} Shipments figures based on certification alone.

== Accolades ==
| Publication | Country | Accolade | Year | Rank |
|---|---|---|---|---|
| Kerrang! | United Kingdom | "100 Greatest Heavy Metal Albums Of All Time" | 1989 | 81 |
