= Fool for Your Loving =

1980 single by Whitesnake

Single by Whitesnake

from the album Ready an' Willing
- Released: 11 April 1980 (UK); July 1980 (US)
- Recorded: 1980
- Genre: Hard rock; heavy metal
- Length: 4:18
- Label: United Artists; Mirage
- Songwriters: David Coverdale; Micky Moody; Bernie Marsden
- Producer: Martin Birch

Whitesnake singles chronology
"Long Way from Home" (1979)	"Fool for Your Loving" (1980)	"Ready an' Willing" (1980)

Music video
- "Fool for Your Loving" on YouTube

"Fool for Your Loving"

Single by Whitesnake

from the album Slip of the Tongue
- B-side: "Slow Poke Music"
- Released: 17 October 1989 (US); 13 November 1989 (UK); 18 November 1989 (Japan)
- Recorded: 1988
- Genre: Glam metal
- Length: 4:10
- Label: EMI; Geffen; CBS/Sony
- Songwriters: David Coverdale; Micky Moody; Bernie Marsden
- Producers: Mike Clink; Keith Olsen

Whitesnake singles chronology
"Crying in the Rain '87" (1988)	"Fool for Your Loving" (1989)	"The Deeper the Love" (1990)

Music video
- "Fool for Your Loving '89" on YouTube

"Fool for Your Loving" is a song recorded by British rock band Whitesnake. Originally released on their 1980 album Ready an' Willing, it was re-recorded for their 1989 album Slip of the Tongue.

== Background and Recording ==
The song was Co-written by David Coverdale, Bernie Marsden and Micky Moody and was inspired by the breakup of Coverdale's first marriage. In Firecracker magazine, Coverdale said:

"You can look at my first marriage and see "Fool for Your Loving" and "Don't Break My Heart Again." A lot of those were fueled by songs about a relationship that once was very positive but sadly was unfolding into not positive."

The song was originally written for blues legend B. B. King.

The song was the first big hit of Whitesnake's, reaching number 13 on the UK Singles Chart and number 53 on the U.S. Billboard Hot 100. This remains one of Whitesnake's most popular and well-known songs. David Coverdale has stated that he prefers the original to the 1989-version. A music video was also made, which features the band performing the song live on stage.

=== Re-recorded ===
As with the previous album, an old Whitesnake song was re-recorded for the band's 1989-album Slip of the Tongue. This time the band chose their 1980 UK-hit "Fool for Your Loving". The re-recorded version was the first single released from Slip of the Tongue, but according to David Coverdale, the song "Judgement Day" was originally supposed to be the first single, but the record company insisted on "Fool for Your Loving". In the booklet of Slip of the Tongue 20th Anniversary Edition, David Coverdale comments :

"I was mortified when I allowed myself to be talked into letting Geffen release the re-recorded version of "Fool for Your Loving", instead of "Judgement Day" as the first one out of the box to promote the album... I knew radio would be all over "Judgement Day" just from the market research we did back then... but, Kalodner, Rosenblatt, Marco Babineau, my manager and some of our radio people, all people whose opinions I trusted, came down to the Record Plant when I was finishing off the album and all confronted me with what they felt was the way to go... that it would be a mistake to go with "Judgement Day"... Not only I but the band were really upset about that decision... I've regretted it ever since... I have no doubt it was Kalodner's idea, thinking we could achieve the same as we'd had with the re-recorded "Here I Go Again"... Anyway...they were wrong and so was I to go along with it... Another hard lesson learned... Stick to your guns if you believe in it...It's the only way..."

After its release, the re-recorded version charted better in the US than the original, reaching number 37 on the Billboard Hot 100, number 2 on the Mainstream Rock Charts, but in the UK it failed to match the original's success, only reaching number 43.

A music video was also made for the song featuring the band performing on a stage, with smoke and headlights. There are also scenes of singer David Coverdale in a padded room and scenes of Coverdale's then-wife, Tawny Kitaen being chased by a car. Guitarist Adrian Vandenberg also appears in the video, even though he does not play on the song, due to a hand injury he sustained prior to the recording.

== Track listing ==
=== Original 1980 Version ===
1980 European single
No.	Title	Writer(s)	Length
1.	"Fool for Your Loving"	Coverdale, Moody, Marsden	4:18
2.	"Mean Business (from Lovehunter)"	Coverdale, Moody, Marsden, Murray, Lord, Dowle	3:48
3.	"Don't Mess with Me (from Trouble)"	Coverdale, Moody, Marsden, Murray, Lord, Dowle	3:25

1980 North American single
No.	Title	Writer(s)	Length
1.	"Fool for Your Loving"	Coverdale, Moody, Marsden	4:18
2.	"Black and Blue"	Coverdale, Moody	4:06

1980 Japanese single
No.	Title	Writer(s)	Length
1.	"Fool for Your Loving"	Coverdale, Moody, Marsden	4:15
2.	"Mean Business (from Lovehunter)"	Coverdale, Moody, Marsden, Murray, Lord, Dowle	3:45

=== 1989 Slip of the Tongue re-recorded version ===
1989 European Maxi single
No.	Title	Writer(s)	Length
1.	"Fool for Your Loving"	Coverdale, Marsden, Moody	4:11
2.	"Slow Poke Music"	Coverdale, Vandenberg	4:00
3.	"Walking in the Shadow of the Blues (live) [from Live... in the Heart of the City]"	Coverdale, Marsden	4:57

1989 European/American/Japanese promo single
No.	Title	Writer(s)	Length
1.	"Fool for Your Loving"	Coverdale, Marsden, Moody	4:11
2.	"Slow Poke Music"	Coverdale, Vandenberg	4:00

1989 American CHR single
No.	Title	Writer(s)	Length
1.	"Fool for Your Loving (CHR Mix)"	Coverdale, Marsden, Moody	4:10

== Personnel ==
1980 version line-up

- David Coverdale – vocals
- Micky Moody – guitars
- Bernie Marsden – guitars
- Neil Murray – bass
- Ian Paice – drums
- Jon Lord – keyboards

1989 re-recorded version line-up

- David Coverdale – vocals
- Steve Vai – guitars
- Rudy Sarzo – bass
- Tommy Aldridge – drums
- Adrian Vandenberg – guitar arrangements
1989 re-recorded version additional musicians
- Don Airey — keyboards
- David Rosenthal — keyboards
- Claude Gaudette — keyboards
- Glenn Hughes — backing vocals
- Tommy Funderburk — backing vocals
- Richard Page — backing vocals

== Chart performance ==
1980 chart performance for "Fool for Your Loving"
Chart (1980)	Peak position
Ireland (IRMA)	11
Netherlands (Dutch Top 40)	19
New Zealand (Recorded Music NZ)	22
UK Singles (The Official Charts Company)	13
US Billboard Hot 100	53

1989 chart performance for "Fool for Your Loving"
Chart (1989) re-recording	Peak position
Australia (ARIA)	69
Canada Top Singles (RPM)	37
Netherlands (Dutch Top 40)	19
UK Singles (The Official Charts Company)	43
US Billboard Hot 100	37
US Billboard Mainstream Rock	2
