= Don't Break My Heart Again =

Single by Whitesnake

from the album Come an' Get It
- B-side: "Child of Babylon"
- Released: 20 March 1981
- Recorded: 1980
- Genre: Hard rock; blues rock; heavy metal
- Length: 4:04
- Label: Liberty
- Songwriter: David Coverdale

Whitesnake singles chronology
"Ain't No Love in the Heart of the City - Live" (1980)	"Don't Break My Heart Again" (1981)	"Would I Lie to You" (1981)

"Don't Break My Heart Again" is a song by the British rock band Whitesnake from their 1981 studio album Come an' Get It. Written by vocalist David Coverdale, the song was inspired by the breakdown of his first marriage. The guitar solo performed by Bernie Marsden was recorded on the first take. Despite numerous attempts to top it, Marsden eventually conceded and agreed to use the first take. Guitarist Doug Aldrich (who played with the band from 2003 to 2014) later named "Don't Break My Heart Again" one of his favourite Whitesnake songs.

== Release ==
The song was released as the lead single from Come an' Get It in March 1981. The B-side features the track "Child of Babylon", which is also on the album. "Don't Break My Heart Again" reached number 17 on UK Singles Chart. A music video was also produced and the band performed the song on the German television show Rockpop.

== Track listing ==
- 7" single (UK)
1. "Don't Break My Heart Again" - 4:04 (David Coverdale)
2. "Child of Babylon" - 4:50 (Coverdale/Bernie Marsden)

== Personnel ==
- David Coverdale – vocals
- Micky Moody – guitar, backing vocals
- Bernie Marsden – guitar, backing vocals
- Neil Murray – bass guitar
- Ian Paice – drums
- Jon Lord – keyboards
- Martin Birch - production, engineering, mixing

== Charts ==
Chart (1981)	Peak position
UK Singles (The Official Charts Company)	17
Ireland (IRMA)	17
