= David Coverdale =

English rock singer (born 1951)

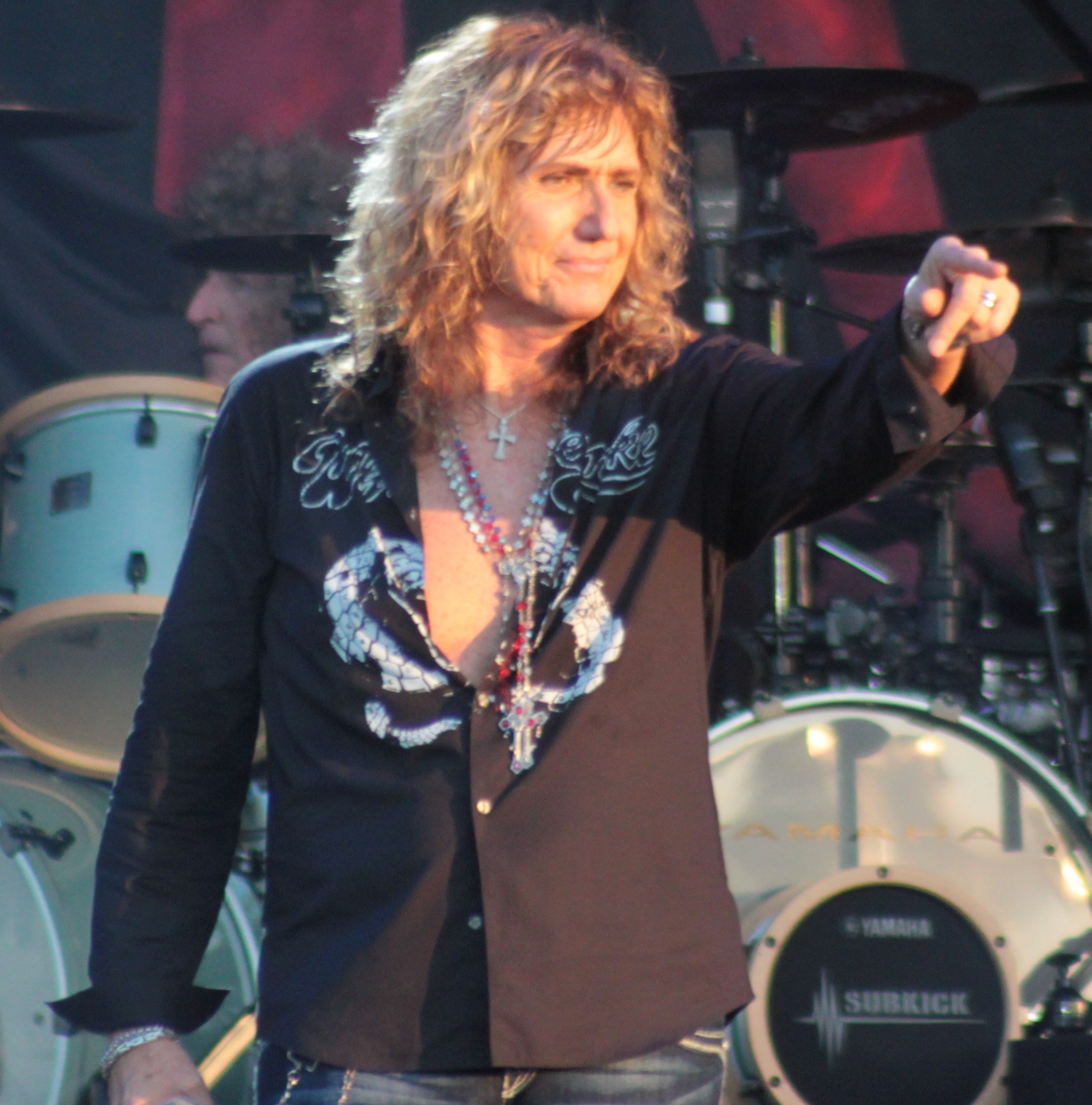
- Coverdale in 2013

Background information
- Born: 22 September 1951 (age 75); Saltburn-by-the-Sea, North Riding of Yorkshire, England
- Genres: Hard rock; blues rock; heavy metal; blue-eyed soul; glam metal
- Occupations: Singer; songwriter
- Years active: 1966–2025
- Labels: Purple; EMI; United Artists; Rhino
- Formerly of: Whitesnake; Deep Purple; Coverdale–Page; Vintage 67; The Government; Fabulosa Brothers
- Spouses: Julia Borkowski (m. 1974; div. 1982); Tawny Kitaen (m. 1989; div. 1991); Cindy Coverdale (m. 1997)
- Website: whitesnake.com

David Coverdale (born 22 September 1951) is a retired English singer and songwriter best known as the founder and lead singer of the hard rock band Whitesnake.

Coverdale was the lead singer of Deep Purple from 1973 to 1976. He founded Whitesnake in 1978. Whitesnake gained significant popularity in the UK, Europe, and Asia. In 1987, the band released the Whitesnake album. Featuring the hit singles "Here I Go Again" and "Is This Love", the album went multi-platinum and made the band popular in North America. During Whitesnake's first hiatus from 1990 to 1993, Coverdale collaborated with Led Zeppelin guitarist Jimmy Page on the album Coverdale–Page, which went platinum. Coverdale has also released three albums as a solo artist.

Coverdale is known for his powerful, blues-tinged voice. In 2016, he was inducted into the Rock and Roll Hall of Fame as a member of Deep Purple. He retired and disbanded Whitesnake in 2025.

== Early life ==
Coverdale was born on 22 September 1951, in Saltburn-by-the-Sea, North Riding of Yorkshire, England, son of Thomas Joseph Coverdale and Winnifred May (Roberts) Coverdale. According to Coverdale, his maternal side and mother "were the singers", while paternal side "were the painters, the sketchers, the artists". He was initiated into music at his maternal grandmother's place and school, at an early age started learning to play guitar and piano, but drawing was his primary medium of expression.

From the beginning, Coverdale showed singing talent; he "discovered that he could project" and had a "gut voice".

== Career ==
=== Deep Purple (1973–1976) ===
Coverdale started his career performing with local bands Vintage 67 (1966–1968), The Government (1968–1972), and Fabulosa Brothers (1972–1973). By 1973, he had left art college and was successfully working as a "singing salesman" until he saw an article Melody Maker that said Deep Purple was looking for a singer to replace Ian Gillan. Coverdale was familiar with Deep Purple as his former group The Government had played with Deep Purple on the same bill in 1969. After sending a tape and auditioning, Coverdale was admitted into the band due to "his singing and songwriting talents".

In February 1974, Deep Purple released their first album with Coverdale. Entitled Burn, the album was certified gold in the United States on 20 March 1974. In April 1974, Coverdale and Deep Purple performed to over 200,000 fans on his first trip to the United States at the California Jam. In November 1974, Burn was followed-up by Stormbringer. The funk and soul influences of the previous record were even more prominent on Stormbringer; for this reason and others, guitarist Ritchie Blackmore left the band in June 1975.

Coverdale was instrumental in persuading the band to continue with American guitarist Tommy Bolin (of Billy Cobham and James Gang fame). As Jon Lord put it, "David Coverdale came up to me and said, 'Please keep the band together.' David played me the album that Tommy did with Billy Cobham. We liked his playing on it and invited Tommy to audition.'"

In March 1976, at the end of a concert, Coverdale walked off in tears and handed in his resignation. He was told there was no band left to quit, as Lord and Ian Paice had already decided to break up the band. The band's breakup was made public in July 1976. Coverdale said in an interview: "I was frightened to leave the band. Purple was my life, Purple gave me my break, but all the same I wanted out."

=== Early solo efforts (1977–1978) ===
After the demise of Deep Purple, Coverdale embarked on a solo career. In the wake of the punk movement, he stayed true to his blues rock roots. He released his first solo studio album in February 1977, titled White Snake. All songs were written by Coverdale and guitarist Micky Moody, and the music shows funk, R&B and jazz influences. As his first solo effort, Coverdale later said: "It's very difficult to think back and talk sensibly about the first album. White Snake had been a very inward-looking, reflective and low-key affair in many ways, written and recorded as it was in the aftermath of the collapse of Deep Purple." Even though the album was not successful, its title inspired the name of Coverdale's future band.

In 1978, Coverdale released his second studio album, Northwinds. Its "blues- and R&B-influenced hard rock" style was received much better than his previous album had been. In 2021, Classic Rock described it as "a remarkably mature album that can still send shivers down the spine 30 years after it was recorded" and as the "antithesis" of Whitesnake's super-slick self-titled 1987 album". Before Northwinds was released, Coverdale had already formed a new band.

=== Early Whitesnake era (1978–1983) ===
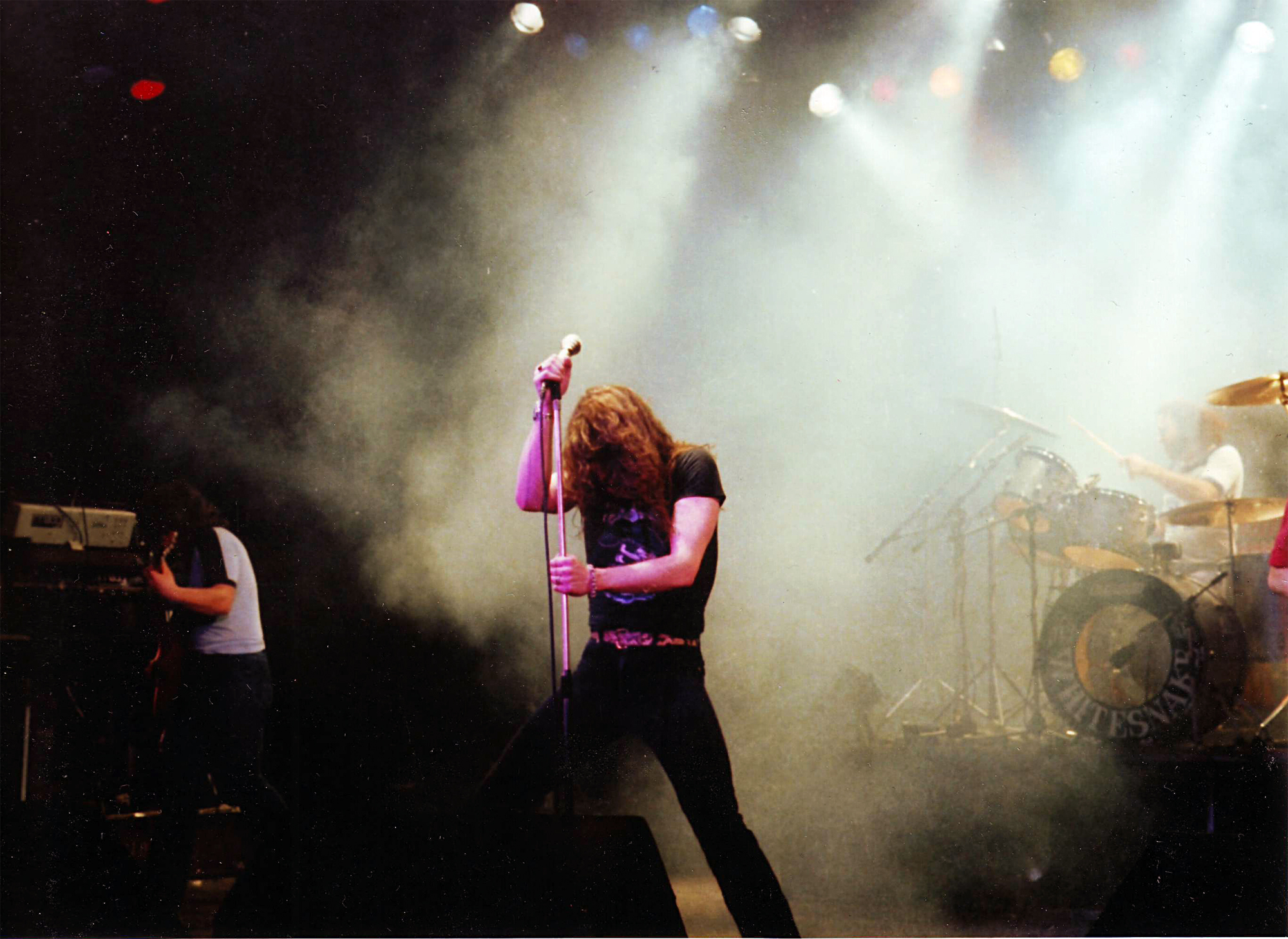
Coverdale with Whitesnake at the Hammersmith Odeon, London, 1981

A band dubbed David Coverdale's Whitesnake played their first show at Lincoln Technical College on 3 March 1978. Coverdale had originally wanted the group to be simply called Whitesnake, but added his own name as it carried some clout due to his prior stint with Deep Purple. David Coverdale's Whitesnake released an EP, Snakebite, in June 1978. In Europe, the EP was combined with four tracks from Coverdale's Northwinds to make up a full-length album.

On 5 July 1978, the band--introduced as Whitesnake--performed at the Paris Theatre for BBC Radio 1's In Concert programme alongside The Only Ones. Whitesnake's debut album, Trouble, was released in October 1978, and it reached number 50 on the UK Albums Chart. The band's second album, Lovehunter, was released on 21 September 1979, and it reached number 29 on the UK Albums Chart. Ready an' Willing was released on 31 May 1980, and it reached number six on the UK Albums Chart. It also became the band's first album to chart in the US, where it reached number 90 on the Billboard 200 chart. Its success was helped by the lead single "Fool for Your Loving", which reached number 13 and number 53 in the UK and the US, respectively. In the UK, the record was certified gold by the British Phonographic Industry for sales of over 100,000 copies.

In support of Ready an' Willing, Whitesnake toured the US for the first time supporting Jethro Tull. Later that year, they supported AC/DC in Europe. With the benefit of a hit single, Whitesnake's audience in the UK began to grow. Thus, the band recorded and released the double live album Live... in the Heart of the City. The record combined new material recorded in June 1980 at the Hammersmith Odeon with the previously released Live at Hammersmith album. Live... in the Heart of the City proved to be an even bigger success than Ready an' Willing, reaching number five in the UK. It would later go platinum with sales of over 300,000 copies. In North America, the album was released as a single record version, excluding the live material from 1978.

Come an' Get It, was released on 6 April 1981. Charting in seven countries, it gave the group their highest ever UK chart position at number two. That same year, the album was certified gold. The single "Don't Break My Heart Again" also charted at number seventeen in the UK. Coverdale later named the record his favorite album of the band's early years, stating: "Even though we had some great songs on each album, I don't feel that we came as close as we did on [Come an' Get It], as far as consistency is concerned."

Coverdale put Whitesnake on hold in early 1982 to make time for the treatment and care of his sick daughter. When he felt that the time was right to return, he reformed the band, which thereafter released the album Saints & Sinners. Also in 1982, Coverdale was considered for the vocalist position of Black Sabbath following the departure of Ronnie James Dio. He declined to join, wanting to continue with Whitesnake.

=== International success of Whitesnake (1984–1990) ===
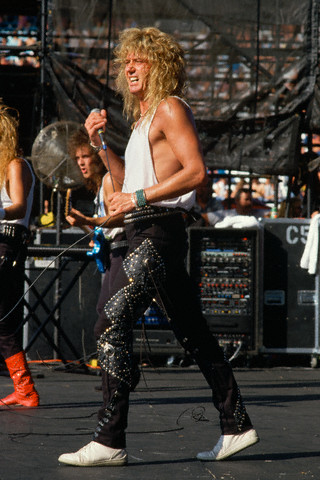
Coverdale performing with Whitesnake on their 1987 tour

Whitesnake gained significant popularity in the UK, Europe, and Asia, but North American success remained elusive. In 1984, the album Slide It In dented the US charts, where it peaked at number 40. The album is certified double platinum in the US and sold six million worldwide.

The band began tracking their next record at Little Mountain Sound Studios in Vancouver with producer Mike Stone. By early 1986, much of the album had been recorded. When it came time for Coverdale to record his vocals, he noticed his voice was unusually nasal and off-pitch. After consulting several specialists, Coverdale learned that he had contracted a severe sinus infection. After receiving some antibiotics, Coverdale flew to Compass Point Studios in the Bahamas to resume recording. The infection resurfaced, causing Coverdale's septum to collapse. He required surgery. By late 1986, production on the record was mostly finished. At the time the album was finished, Coverdale was the sole remaining member of Whitesnake. "It was a band in disarray..." observed keyboardist Don Airey. "David was four million dollars in debt; didn't know if he was coming or going."

The album 1987 (entitled Whitesnake in United States and Serpens Albus in Japan) was released on 16 March 1987 in North America and 30 March in Europe. It peaked at number eight in the UK, while in the US it reached number two on the Billboard 200 chart. In total, the record charted in 14 countries and quickly became the most commercially successful of the band's career, selling over eight million copies in the US alone. The singles "Here I Go Again" and "Is This Love" reached number one and two, respectively, on the Billboard Hot 100.

The new Whitesnake line-up made their live debut at the Texxas Jam festival in June 1987. They then toured the US supporting Mötley Crüe on their Girls, Girls, Girls Tour. Beginning on 30 October 1987, Whitesnake embarked on a headlining arena tour, which was temporarily interrupted in April 1988 when Coverdale had a herniated disc removed from his lower back. At the 1988 Brit Awards, the band were nominated for Best British Group, while the album 1987 was nominated for Favorite Pop/Rock Album at the American Music Awards.

Slip of the Tongue was released on 7 November 1989 in the US, followed by a worldwide release on 13 November. It reached number ten on the UK Albums Chart as well as the Billboard 200 and was certified platinum in the US. Singles from the album included "Fool for Your Loving" (originally found on 1980's Ready an' Willing) and "The Deeper the Love". Coverdale would later admit to having mixed feelings about the record, though he learned to enjoy and accept it as a part of Whitesnake's catalogue.

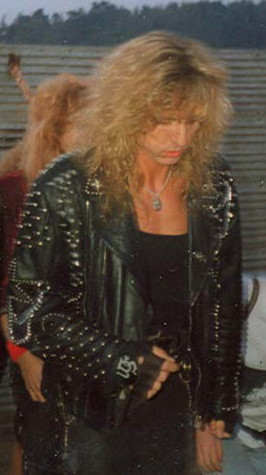
Coverdale at the Monsters of Rock festival in 1990

In February 1990, Whitesnake embarked on the Liquor & Poker World Tour, during which the band headlined the Monsters of Rock festival at Castle Donington for a second time (the show was later released as a live album). The tour ended 26 September 1990 at the Budokan in Tokyo. After the show, Coverdale informed the rest of the band that he would be taking an extended break, effectively disbanding Whitesnake. Coverdale's decision to put Whitesnake on hold was largely due to exhaustion. He had also become disillusioned with the band's glam image. In a 1993 interview with Robert Hilburn, he commented that he "had to stop everything, this whole circus. I had never gone into (music) for the image thing at all, and I really couldn't do it anymore".

=== Coverdale and Page (1990–1993) ===
In the fall of 1990, a meeting and subsequent collaboration was set up with guitarist Jimmy Page from Led Zeppelin. Both have said that the collaboration revitalised them on many levels. This collaboration resulted in the album Coverdale–Page, released in March 1993. The album was a hit worldwide, reaching number four in the UK and number five in the US, and was certified Platinum in the US on 7 April 1995.

=== Return of Whitesnake and Restless Heart (1994, 1997–1998) ===
On 4 July 1994, EMI released Whitesnake's Greatest Hits in Europe. In the US, it was released on 19 July by Geffen Records. The record proved to be a success, reaching number four on the UK Albums Chart. It would later be certified gold in the UK and platinum in the US.

Prior to the record's release, Coverdale had been planning a European solo tour with a backing band he likened to the backing band who played on Joe Cocker's Mad Dogs & Englishmen album. Because of the Greatest Hits' success, Coverdale was instead asked by EMI to tour as Whitesnake. Though reluctant, Coverdale eventually agreed, seeing it as an opportunity to just have fun and play live. The tour began in Europe on 20 June 1994, followed by several UK dates beginning in July. In October, the band toured in Japan and Australia.

After completing the Greatest Hits tour, Whitesnake were dropped by Geffen Records. Coverdale then resumed writing with Adrian Vandenberg on what was intended to be a solo album. As the record was being finished, the new higher-ups at EMI demanded it be released under the Whitesnake moniker. Coverdale objected, as he felt the record was stylistically too different from the band. Eventually a compromise was reached, and Coverdale agreed to release the album under the name "David Coverdale & Whitesnake". As a result of the name change, the guitars and drums on the album were brought up in the mix, something Coverdale later expressed disappointment over.

Restless Heart was released on 26 March 1997 in Japan, followed by a European release on 26 May. The record only reached number 34 on the UK Albums Chart, but peaked at number three on UK Rock & Metal Albums Chart.

The supporting tour for Restless Heart was billed as Whitesnake's farewell tour, as Coverdale wanted to explore other musical avenues. Before the start of the tour, Coverdale and Vandenberg played several acoustic shows in Europe and Japan. One of these shows was later released as the live album Starkers in Tokyo. The Last Hurrah tour began in September 1997 and ended in South America that December.

=== Back to solo and Into the Light (1999–2002) ===
In 2000, Coverdale released his first solo studio album in 22 years, titled Into The Light, with the songs "Love is Blind" and "Slave", released as singles. Even though the album was not a big hit, it is his most successful solo album both commercially and critically, with the song "River Song" receiving most attention and the album did return Coverdale, to the music business.

=== Re-reformation of Whitesnake (2003–2025) ===
In January 2003, Coverdale re-reformed Whitesnake for an American tour with Scorpions in early 2003, with Tommy Aldridge on drums, Marco Mendoza (bass), Doug Aldrich (guitar), Reb Beach (ex-Winger guitarist) and keyboardist Timothy Drury. They also performed on the Rock Never Stops Tour in the same year.

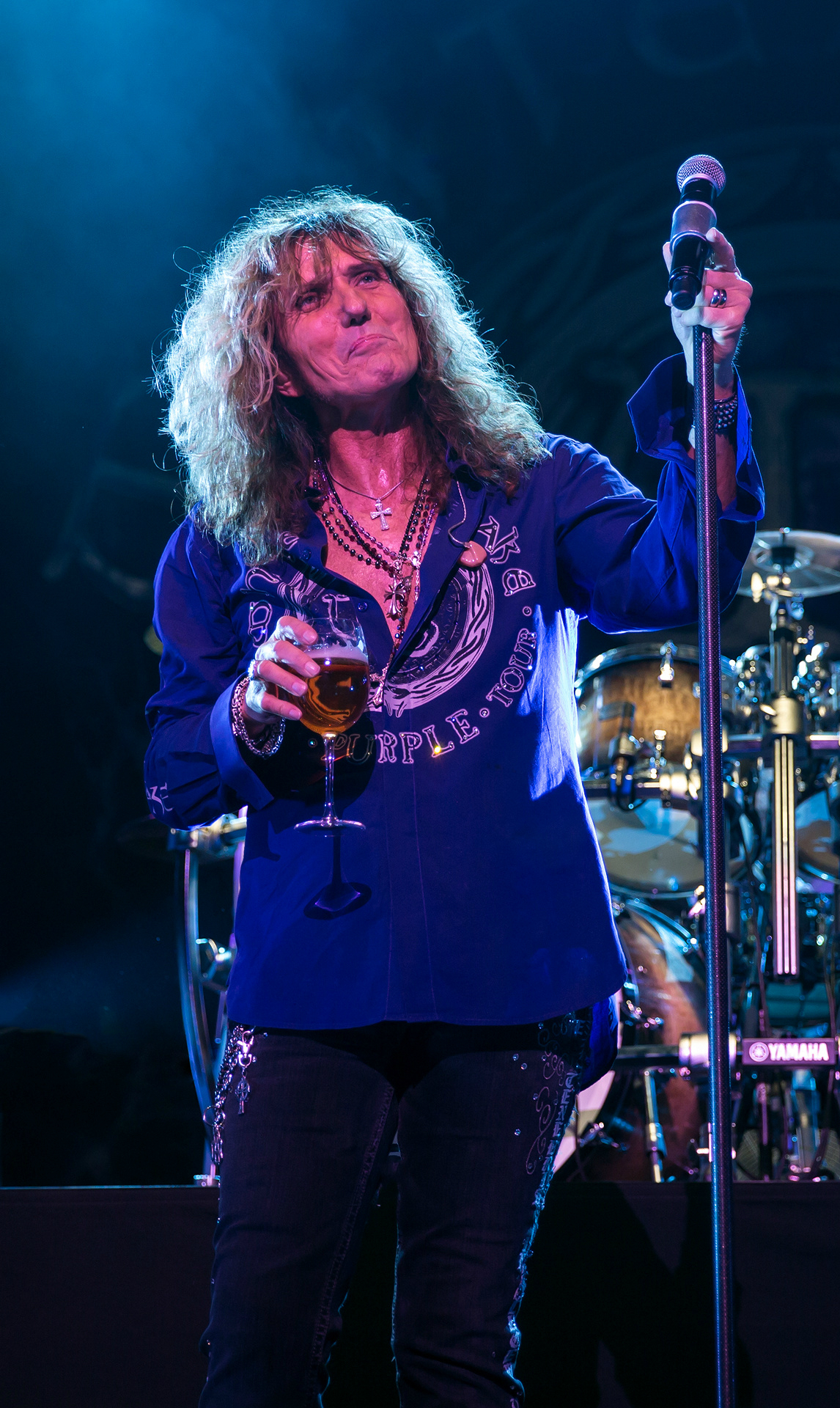
Coverdale performing in 2015

In April 2008, the band released its first new studio album in over 11 years titled Good to Be Bad to great reviews. On 11 August 2009 Whitesnake played a show at Red Rocks Amphitheatre in Morrison, Colorado when Coverdale suffered a vocal injury. After seeing a specialist, it was announced the following day, that Coverdale had been suffering from severe vocal fold edema and a left vocal fold vascular lesion. The remainder of the tour with Judas Priest was cancelled so that the injury would not worsen. In March 2011 the band released their 11th studio album, Forevermore.

In May 2015, the band released their 12th The Purple Album, featuring cover versions of the songs that Coverdale had originally sang on with Deep Purple. It was followed by a supporting tour. In May 2019, the band released their 13th studio album titled Flesh & Blood.

In May 2022, the band began their COVID-19 delayed farewell tour, with European dates beginning in Dublin on 10 May, but were only able to continue, until their show in Croatia on 2 July 2022. After cancelling the last 11 dates of the European leg of the tour due to health problems affecting various band members including Reb Beach, Tommy Aldridge and Coverdale himself, Whitesnake subsequently cancelled the entire 2022 North American leg of its Farewell Tour as Coverdale was forced to deal with ongoing respiratory health issues.

In 2024, a compilation album, Into the Light: The Solo Albums, was released, containing new mixes and remasters of all of Coverdale's solo albums under the Whitesnake name.

=== Retirement ===
On 13 November 2025, Coverdale announced his retirement, disbanding Whitesnake altogether.

== Legacy ==
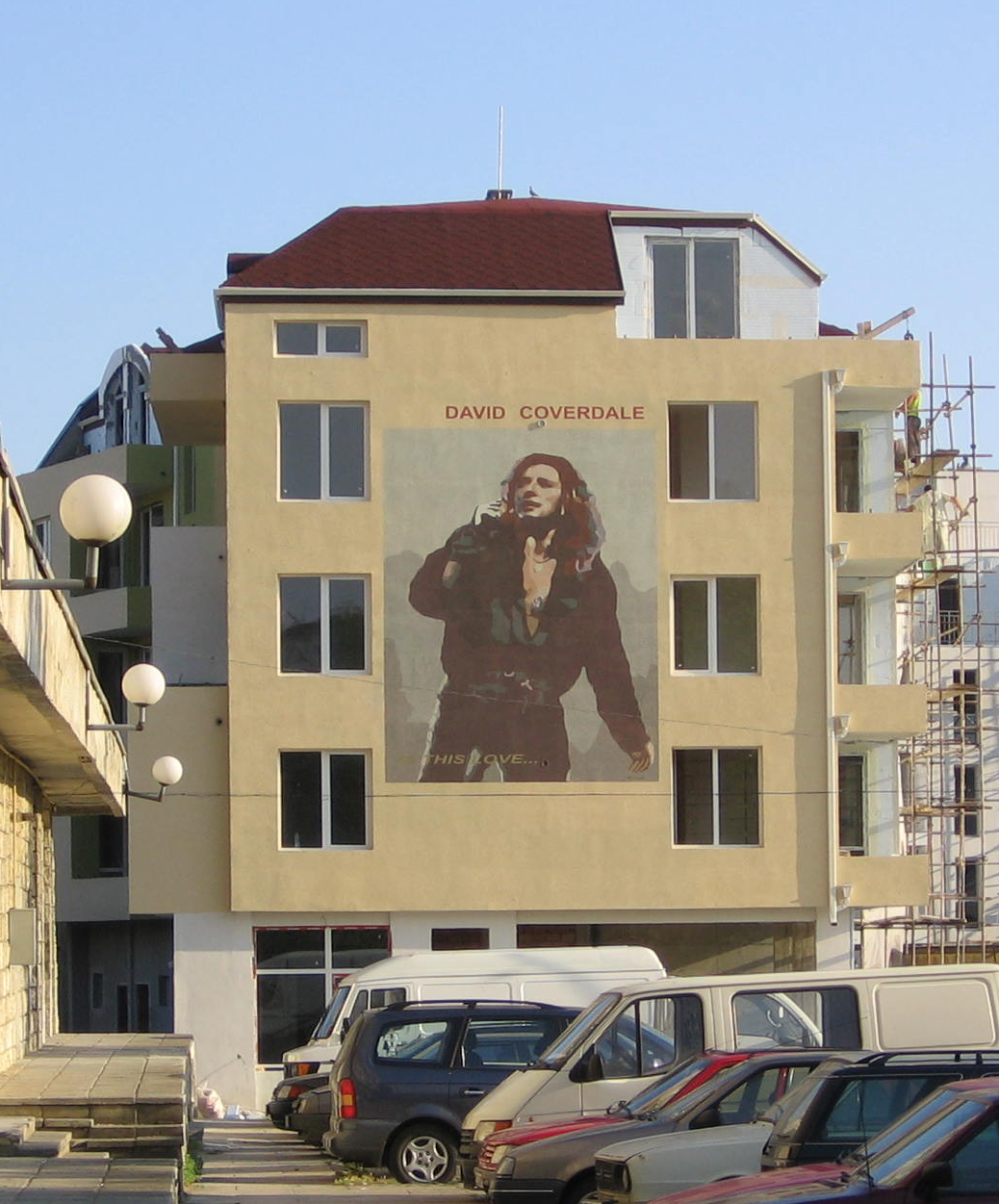
Coverdale mural at Kavarna, Bulgaria.

Coverdale is best known as the lead singer of Whitesnake. He is known for his powerful, blues-tinged voice.

In 2006, hard rock/heavy metal magazine Hit Parader named Coverdale as No. 54 on its list of the 100 Greatest Metal Vocalists of All Time. In 2009, he was voted as sixth out of 40 contenders for "the greatest voice in rock" in a poll conducted by UK classic rock radio station Planet Rock.

In 2003, PopMatters proclaimed him as the "crown prince of '70s rock. Not even Plant, definitely not Bad Company's Paul Rodgers, or anyone else can touch Coverdale at this moment in time when it comes to rock icons from that era — it's just a shame that hardly anyone comes to see it". In 2015, Dave Everley of Classic Rock considered that "Whitesnake are one of the great British bands of the past 40 years, and Coverdale is one of the finest blue-eyed soul singers, full-stop". William Pinfold in Record Collector's review of Martin Popoff's 2015 biography on Whitesnake commented that both the band and Coverdale "have been consistently taken seriously" but "are underrated compared with the plaudits given to their 70s/80s peers". Pinfold called Coverdale "outrageously talented, charismatic and in equal parts lordly and humble" and "a hugely likeable figure".

In 2016, Coverdale was inducted into the Rock and Roll Hall of Fame as a member of Deep Purple.

== Personal life ==
Coverdale married Julia Borkowski of Poland in 1974. Their daughter was born in 1978. Coverdale's second marriage was to American model and actress Tawny Kitaen (1961-2021). Coverdale and Kitaen married on 17 February 1989 and divorced in April 1991. Kitaen was known for her provocative appearances in Whitesnake's music videos for "Here I Go Again", "Is This Love", and "Still of the Night". Coverdale married his third wife, Cindy Coverdale, on 30 May 1997. Cindy Coverdale is an author (The Food That Rocks). David and Cindy Coverdale have a son.

On 1 March 2007, Coverdale became a US citizen in a ceremony in Reno, Nevada. He holds dual US and UK citizenship. For many years in the 1980s, he lived in hotels, including the Mondrian Hotel in Los Angeles. Beginning in 1988, he lived on an almost 10,000 sq ft estate in Incline Village, Nevada on Lake Tahoe, where he built a luxurious house. In 2019, he decided to sell the property. In 2021, it reportedly sold for $6.8 million.

Coverdale considers himself to be more spiritual than religious. Since the late 1960s, Coverdale has practised meditation regularly. He has said that he considers it to be "the most incredible accessory, or tool, that I've found in my life".

== Discography ==
=== Solo ===
==== Studio albums ====
- White Snake (1977)
- Northwinds (1978)
- Into the Light (2000)

==== Singles ====
- "Hole in the Sky" (1977; UK only)
- "Whitesnake" (1977; Japan only)
- "Lady" (1977; Australia only)
- "Breakdown" (1978)
- "The Last Note of Freedom" (Days of Thunder soundtrack) (1990)
- "Love is Blind" (2000)
- "Slave" (2000)

=== with Deep Purple ===
- Burn (1974)
- Stormbringer (1974)
- Come Taste the Band (1975)

=== with Whitesnake ===
- Trouble (1978)
- Lovehunter (1979)
- Ready an' Willing (1980)
- Come an' Get It (1981)
- Saints & Sinners (1982)
- Slide It In (1984)
- 1987 (1987)
- Slip of the Tongue (1989)
- Restless Heart (1997)
- Good to Be Bad (2008)
- Forevermore (2011)
- The Purple Album (2015)
- Flesh & Blood (2019)

=== with Jimmy Page ===
- Coverdale–Page (1993)

== Sources ==
- Popoff, Martin (2015). Sail Away: Whitesnake's Fantastic Voyage. Soundcheck Books LLP. ISBN 978-0-9575-7008-5.
