= Whitesnake discography =

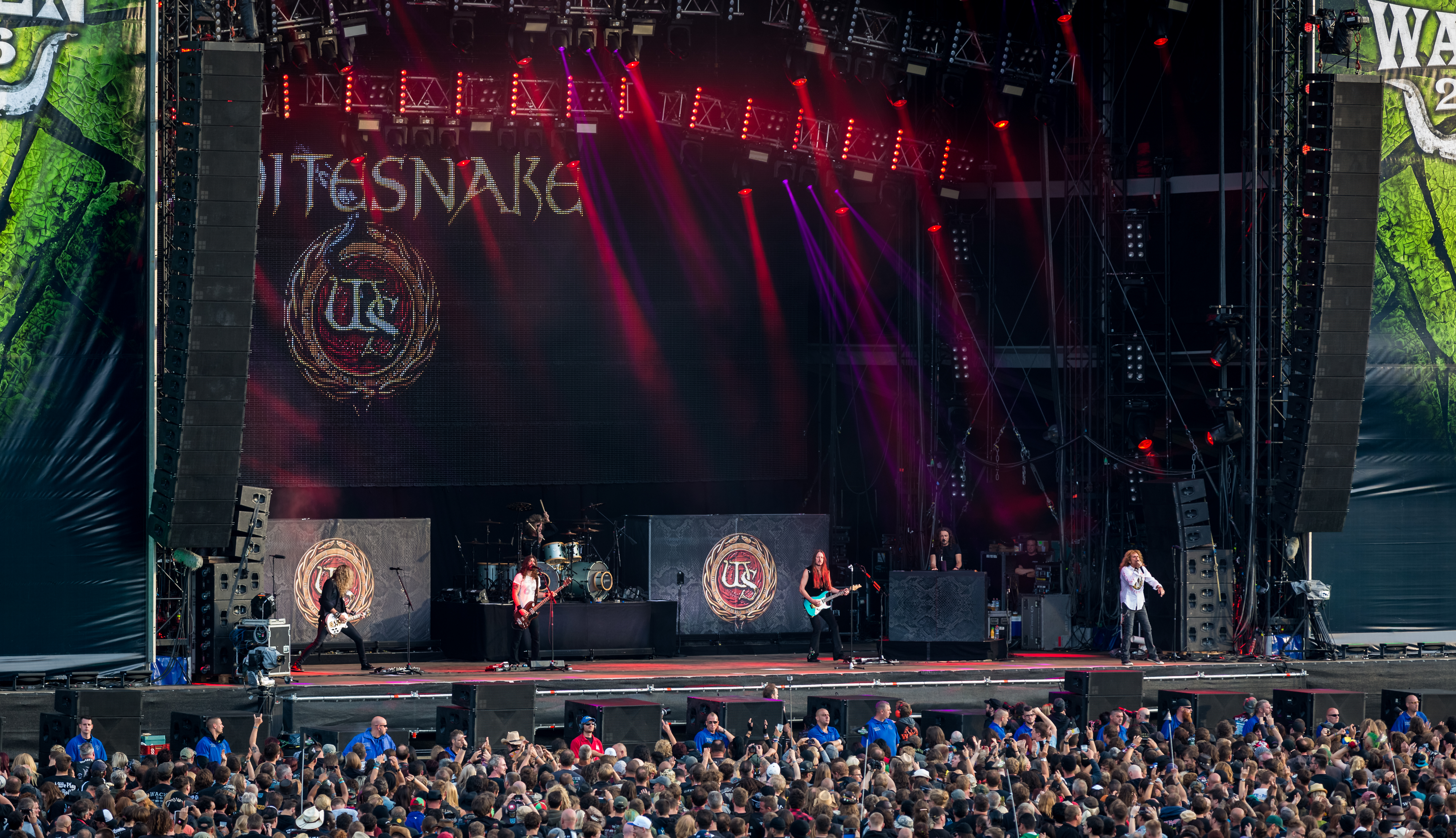
- Whitesnake performing in 2016
- Studio albums: 13
- Extended plays: 5
- Live albums: 9
- Compilation albums: 15
- Singles: 44
- Video albums: 9
- Music videos: 71
- Box sets: 5

The British-American hard rock band Whitesnake have released thirteen studio albums, nine live albums, twelve compilation albums, seven box sets, Five extended plays (EPs), 40 singles, nine video albums and 29 music videos. Formed in London in 1978 by vocalist David Coverdale, the band originally featured guitarists Micky Moody and Bernie Marsden, bassist Neil Murray, keyboardist Peter Solley and drummer Dave Dowle. The group's debut EP Snakebite was released in June 1978 and reached number 61 on the UK Singles Chart. After replacing Solley with Jon Lord, the band released their debut full-length album Trouble later in the year, which reached number 50 on the UK Albums Chart. 1979's Lovehunter reached number 29 on the chart. Lead single "Long Way from Home" charted at number 55.

Dowle was replaced by Ian Paice after the release of Lovehunter, and in 1980 Whitesnake reached the UK top ten for the first time with Ready an' Willing, which peaked at number 6 and was certified gold by the British Phonographic Industry (BPI). The album was also the band's first to register on the US Billboard 200, reaching number 90. The album's lead single "Fool for Your Loving" reached number 13 on the UK Singles Chart. The group's first live release, Live... in the Heart of the City, reached number 5 on the UK Albums Chart and was certified platinum by the BPI. 1981's Come an' Get It and 1982's Saints & Sinners also both reached the UK top ten, with the former reaching a peak of number 2 (the band's highest to date). Three singles from across the two albums reached the UK Singles Chart top 40.

After a brief hiatus in 1982 and several lineup changes, Whitesnake resurfaced in 1983 and in 1984 they released Slide It In, which was their first album to reach the US top 40. It was also the band's first release to be certified by the Recording Industry Association of America (RIAA), reaching double platinum status. 1987's Whitesnake was even more successful, reaching number 2 on the Billboard 200, number 5 on the Canadian Albums Chart, and the top ten in several other regions. The album was certified eight times platinum by the RIAA, five times platinum by Music Canada, and platinum by the BPI. The single "Here I Go Again" topped the Billboard Hot 100 and the Canadian Singles Chart, as well as reaching the top ten of the UK Singles Chart. Its follow-up "Is This Love" reached number 2 on the Hot 100 and number 9 in the UK. The band's 1989 release Slip of the Tongue was the band's only other album to reach the US top ten, and the last to be certified by the RIAA (reaching platinum status).

Whitesnake broke up in 1990. Four years later, Greatest Hits was released as the band's first compilation album, reaching number 4 on the UK Albums Chart and being certified gold by the BPI. The band returned with Restless Heart in 1997, which peaked at number 34 in the UK. In early 2003, the band returned on a permanent basis. The 2003 compilation Best of Whitesnake reached number 44 in the UK and was certified gold by the BPI, while the 2006 video release Live... in the Still of the Night reached number 2 on the UK Music Video Chart and was also certified gold. Whitesnake's tenth studio album Good to Be Bad was released in 2008, reaching number 7 in the UK and number 62 in the US. In 2011, the band reached number 33 with Forevermore and number 81 with Live at Donington 1990, in 2013 they reached number 67 with Made in Japan, and in 2015 they reached number 18 with The Purple Album. In 2019 the band released their thirteenth studio album titled Flesh & Blood which reached number 7 on the UK charts. 2020 and 2021 were characterised by the release of musically distinct compilation trilogy albums of white's The Rock Album, red's Love Songs and blue's The Blues Album, all reaching at least number 2 on the UK Rock & Metal Albums Chart.

== Albums ==
=== Studio albums ===
List of studio albums, with selected chart positions and certifications
Title	Album details	Peak chart positions										Sales	Certifications
Title	Album details	UK	AUT	CAN	FIN	GER	NED	NOR	SWE	SWI	US	Sales	Certifications
Trouble	Released: October 1978; Label: EMI; Formats: LP, CS	50	—	—	—	—	—	—	—	—	—	UK: 3,604 (Note: United Kingdom sales figures for Trouble from 2006 as of 2008.)	
Lovehunter	Released: 21 September 1979; Label: United Artists; Formats: LP, CS	29	—	—	—	—	—	—	—	—	—	UK: 22,885 (Note: United Kingdom sales figures for Lovehunter from 1992 as of 2008.)	
Ready an' Willing	Released: 23 May 1980; Label: United Artists, Mirage/Atlantic; Formats: LP, CS	6	—	—	—	—	—	32	—	—	90	UK: 28,210 (Note: United Kingdom sales figures for Ready an' Willing from 1992 as of 2008.)	UK: Gold
Come an' Get It	Released: 6 April 1981; Label: Liberty, Mirage/Atlantic; Formats: LP, CS	2	—	—	3	20	—	26	24	—	151	UK: 26,813 (Note: United Kingdom sales figures for Come an' Get It from 1992 as of 2008.)	JP: Gold; UK: Gold
Saints & Sinners	Released: 15 November 1982; Label: Liberty/EMI; Formats: LP, CS	9	14	—	7	28	—	—	45	—	—	UK: 34,069 (Note: United Kingdom sales figures for Saints & Sinners from 1992 as of 2008.)	UK: Silver
Slide It In	Released: 30 January 1984; Label: Liberty, Geffen, CBS/Sony; Formats: CD, LP, CS	9	—	—	4	14	—	11	12	12	40	UK: 11,646 (Note: United Kingdom sales figures for Slide It In from 1992 as of 2008.); US: 4,000,000+; Worldwide: 6,000,000+	CAN: Platinum; JP: Gold; SWE: Gold; US: 2× Platinum
1987	Released: 30 March 1987; Label: EMI, Geffen, CBS/Sony; Formats: CD, LP, CS	8	25	5	4	13	27	10	8	10	2	UK: 86,996 (Note: United Kingdom sales figures for Whitesnake (1987) from 1992 as of 2008.); US: 10,000,000+; Worldwide: 25,000,000+	CAN: 5× Platinum; GER: Gold; NZ: Platinum; SWE: Gold; SWI: Gold; UK: Platinum; US: 8× Platinum
Slip of the Tongue	Released: 7 November 1989; Label: EMI, Geffen, CBS/Sony; Formats: CD, LP, CS	10	29	18	1	19	43	9	11	11	10	UK: 24,704 (Note: United Kingdom sales figures for Slip of the Tongue from 1992 as of 2008.); Worldwide: 4,000,000+	JP: Gold; UK: Gold; US: Platinum
Restless Heart	Released: 26 March 1997; Label: EMI; Formats: CD, CS	34	45	—	7	26	65	35	5	23	—	Japan: 103,340	
Good to Be Bad	Released: 21 April 2008; Label: Steamhammer, WEA; Format: CD	7	11	23	5	6	33	5	10	15	62	Worldwide: 700,000+	
Forevermore	Released: 9 March 2011; Label: Frontiers, WEA; Formats: CD, DL	33	27	—	11	16	42	16	6	17	49	US: 44,000+	
The Purple Album	Released: 29 April 2015; Label: Frontiers, Rhino; Formats: CD, LP, DL	18	28	—	2	13	24	32	17	11	87		
Flesh & Blood	Released: 10 May 2019; Label: Frontiers; Formats: CD, LP, DL	7	—	—	4	3	51	13	9	2	131	US: 10,780+ (Note: US sales figures based on the first four weeks of release.)	

=== Live albums ===
List of live albums, with selected chart positions and certifications
Title	Album details	Peak chart positions										Sales	Certifications
Title	Album details	UK	AUT	BEL Fla.	BEL Wal.	FRA	GER	ITA	JPN	SWI	US	Sales	Certifications
Live... in the Heart of the City (Recorded 1978~1980)	Released: 3 November 1980; Label: United Artists; Formats: 2LP, CS	5	—	—	—	—	56	—	—	—	146		UK: Platinum
Starkers in Tokyo (Recorded 5 July 1997)	Released: 9 September 1997; Label: EMI; Formats: CD, CS	—	—	—	—	—	—	—	16	—	—		
Live... in the Still of the Night (Recorded October 2004)	Released: 7 February 2006; Label: Coming Home; Formats: DVD, DVD+CD	2	—	—	—	—	23	—	16	—	—		UK: Gold; GER: Gold
Live... in the Shadow of the Blues	Released: 24 November 2006; Label: Steamhammer; Format: 2CD	141	64	—	—	177	82	—	64	—	—		
Live at Donington 1990	Released: 20 May 2011; Label: Frontiers, RHINO; Formats: 2CD, 3LP, DL	81	—	—	100	—	32	85	221	—	—		
Made in Japan (Recorded October 2011)	Released: 22 April 2013; Label: Frontiers; Formats: 2CD, 3LP, DL	67	54	108	59	—	26	—	—	99	—		
Made in Britain / The World Record	Released: 9 July 2013; Label: Frontiers; Formats: 2CD, 4LP, DL	—	—	—	83	—	57	—	59	—	—		
Live in '84: Back to the Bone (Recorded 16 April/11 August 1984)	Released: 7 November 2014; Label: Frontiers; Formats: CD, DL	—	—	—	131	—	98	—	—	—	—		
The Purple Tour (Recorded at Genting Arena, Birmingham, England on 12 December 2015)	Released: 19 January 2018; Label: Rhino; Formats: CD, LP	60	19	111	69	—	17	—	—	31	—	US: 1,700+	

=== Compilations ===
List of compilation albums, with selected chart positions and certifications
Title	Album details	Peak chart positions										Sales	Certifications
Title	Album details	UK	AUS	ESP	FIN	GER	NOR	POR	SWE	SWI	US	Sales	Certifications
The Best of Whitesnake	Released: December 1981; Label: Polydor (Japan); Formats: CD, LP, CS	—	—	—	—	—	—	—	—	—	-		
The Greatest Whitesnake	Released: 29 December 1983; Label: Polydor (Japan); Formats: CD, LP, CS	—	—	—	—	—	—	—	—	—	-		
Best	Released: 1987 and updated as The Best in 1991; Label: Polydor (Japan); Formats: CD, LP, CS	—	—	—	—	—	—	—	—	—	-		
Greatest Hits	Released: 4 July 1994; Label: EMI; Formats: CD, LP, CS	4	34	95	6	51	—	—	17	12	161	UK: 300,218+ (Note: United Kingdom sales figures for Greatest Hits as of 2008.)	UK: Gold; US: Platinum; JP: Gold
The Best of Whitesnake: The Millennium Collection	Released: 27 June 2000; Label: Geffen; Formats: CD, CS	—	—	—	—	—	—	—	—	—	194	US: 768,904+	US: Gold
Here I Go Again: The Whitesnake Collection	Released: 29 October 2002; Label: Geffen; Format: 2CD	—	—	—	—	—	—	—	—	—	—		
Best of Whitesnake	Released: 24 March 2003; Label: EMI; Format: CD	44	—	—	4	83	23	11	31	—	—		UK: Gold
The Silver Anniversary Collection	Released: 20 May 2003; Label: EMI; Format: 2CD	—	—	—	26	—	—	—	—	—	—		
The Early Years	Released: 10 February 2004; Label: EMI; Format: CD	—	—	—	—	—	—	—	—	—	—		
The Definitive Collection	Released: 7 February 2006; Label: Geffen; Format: CD	—	—	—	—	—	—	—	—	—	—		
Gold	Released: 27 June 2006; Label: Geffen; Format: CD	—	—	—	—	—	—	—	—	—	—		
Unzipped	Released: 19 October 2018; Label: Rhino; Formats: CD, download	—	—	150	—	—	36	—	—	48	—		
The Rock Album	Released: 19 June 2020; Label: Rhino; Formats: CD, LP, DL	81	—	—	—	40	—	44	—	36	—		
Love Songs	Released: 6 November 2020; Label: Rhino; Formats: CD, LP, DL	—	—	—	—	66	—	37	—	34	—		
The Blues Album	Released: 19 February 2021; Label: Rhino; Formats: CD, LP, DL	57	—	—	—	13	—	—	—	10	—		
Greatest Hits: Revisited, Remixed, Remastered	Released: 6 May 2022; Label: Rhino; Formats: CD, LP, DL	—	—	—	—	—	—	—	—	—	—		

=== Box sets ===
List of box sets, with selected chart positions
Title	Album details	Peaks				Sales
Title	Album details	UK	FIN	GER	SWI	Sales
Whitesnake 1978-1982	Released: 1 November 1992 (Japan); Label: Polydor; Format: 4CD	—	—	—	—	
The Originals	Released: 1995; Label: EMI; Format: 3CD	—	—	—	—	
Chronicles: 3 Classic Albums	Released: 27 September 2005; Label: Geffen; Format: 3CD	—	—	—	—	
30th Anniversary Collection	Released: 9 June 2008; Label: EMI; Format: 3CD	38	—	—	—	
Box 'o' Snakes: The Sunburst Years 1978–1982	Released: 7 November 2011; Label: EMI; Format: 9CD+DVD+LP	—	27	87	—	
Into the Light: The Solo Albums	Released: 25 October 2024; Label: Rhino; Formats: CD, LP, DL	—	—	—	90	US: 775+
Access All Areas: Live	Released: 25 April 2025; Label: Rhino; Formats: 8CD, DL	—	—	—	—	US: 600+
"—" denotes a release that did not chart or was not issued in that region.

== Extended plays ==
Title	EP details	Peak
Title	EP details	UK
Snakebite	Released: 2 June 1978; Label: Sunburst; Format: 7" vinyl	61
Long Way From Home	Released: 26 October 1979; Label: Sunburst; Format: 7" vinyl	—
Fool For Your Loving	Released: 1980; Label: Sunburst; Format: 7" vinyl	—
Ready An' Willing (Sweet Satisfaction)	Released: 1980; Label: Sunburst; Format: 7" vinyl	—
1987 Versions	Released: 21 October 1987 (Japan only); Label: CBS/Sony; Formats: CD, 12" vinyl	—
"—" denotes a release that was not issued in that region or did not chart.

== Singles ==
List of singles, with selected chart positions, showing year released and album name
Title	Year	Peak chart positions										Certifications	Album
Title	Year	UK	AUS	IRL	CAN	GER	NED	NOR	NZ	US	US Main.	Certifications	Album
"Ain't No Love in the Heart of the City" (Note: released in US/CAN)	1978	—	—	—	—	—	—	—	—	—	—		Snakebite
"Lie Down (A Modern Love Song)"	1978	— (Note: This single did not enter the UK Singles Chart, but did reach number 113 on the Record Business Singles Chart.)	—	—	—	—	—	—	—	—	—		Trouble
"Day Tripper" (Note: released in Germany)	1978	—	—	—	—	—	—	—	—	—	—		Trouble
"The Time Is Right for Love"	1979	—	—	—	—	—	—	—	—	—	—		Trouble
"Long Way from Home"	1979	55	—	—	—	—	—	—	—	—	—		Lovehunter
"Fool for Your Loving"	1980	13	—	11	—	—	—	—	22	53	—		Ready an' Willing
"Ready an' Willing" (Note: released in UK/EU)	1980	43	—	—	—	—	—	—	—	—	—		Ready an' Willing
"Sweet Talker" (Note: released in US/CAN)	1980	—	—	—	—	—	—	—	—	—	—		Ready an' Willing
"Ain't No Love in the Heart of the City" (live)	1980	51	—	—	—	—	—	—	—	— (Note: This single did not enter the US Hot 100 Singles Chart, but did reach number 9 on the Bubbling Under Hot 100 chart in February 1981.)	—		Live... in the Heart of the City
"Don't Break My Heart Again"	1981	17	—	17	—	—	—	—	—	—	—		Come an' Get It
"Would I Lie to You"	1981	37	—	—	—	—	—	—	—	—	—		Come an' Get It
"Here I Go Again"	1982	34	53	—	—	51	—	17	34	—	—	NZ: 3× Platinum; UK: Platinum (2005 Edition) (Note: This 2005 edition of the single includes physical and digital sales, combined with the original 1982 recording and the 1987 re-recording.)	Saints & Sinners
"Bloody Luxury" (Note: released in Japan)	1982	—	—	—	—	—	—	—	—	—	—		Saints & Sinners
"Victim of Love" (Note: released in Germany)	1983	—	—	—	—	—	—	—	—	—	—		Saints & Sinners
"Guilty of Love"	1983	31	—	—	—	—	—	—	—	—	—		Slide It In
"Give Me More Time"	1984	29	—	27	—	—	—	—	—	—	—		Slide It In
"Standing in the Shadow"	1984	62	—	—	—	—	—	—	—	—	—		Slide It In
"Love Ain't No Stranger"	1984	44	—	—	—	—	—	—	—	—	33		Slide It In
"Slow an' Easy" [US radio promo]	1984	—	—	—	—	—	—	—	—	—	17		Slide It In
"Still of the Night"	1987	16	—	23	—	—	—	—	—	79	18		Whitesnake
"Here I Go Again '87"	1987	9	24	7	1	29	6	—	10	1	4	NZ: 3× Platinum; UK: Platinum (2005 Edition) (Note: This 2005 edition of the single includes physical and digital sales, combined with the original 1982 recording and the 1987 re-recording.); UK: Silver (2018 Edition)	Whitesnake
"Is This Love"	1987	9	12	21	11	—	31	—	8	2	13	UK: Silver; ESP: Gold	Whitesnake
"Give Me All Your Love"	1988	18	—	10	—	—	—	—	28	48	22		Whitesnake
"Crying in the Rain '87" [US promo]	1988	—	—	—	—	—	—	—	—	—	—		Whitesnake
"Fool for Your Loving '89"	1989	43	69	—	37	—	19	—	—	37	2		Slip of the Tongue
"Judgement Day" [airplay]	1989	—	—	—	—	—	—	—	—	—	32		Slip of the Tongue
"The Deeper the Love"	1990	35	149	30	36	—	—	—	—	28	4		Slip of the Tongue
"Now You're Gone"	1990	31	—	—	—	—	—	—	—	96	15		Slip of the Tongue
"Is This Love" [reissue] (Note: released in UK/EU)	1994	25	—	—	—	—	—	—	—	—	—		Greatest Hits
"Too Many Tears" (Note: released in UK/EU)	1997	46	—	—	—	—	—	—	—	—	—		Restless Heart
"Don't Fade Away" (Note: released in UK/EU)	1997	—	—	—	—	—	—	—	—	—	—		Restless Heart
"All in the Name of Love" [promo]	1998	—	—	—	—	—	—	—	—	—	—		Restless Heart
"All I Want Is You"	2006	—	—	—	—	—	—	—	—	—	—		Live... in the Shadow of the Blues
"Lay Down Your Love"	2008	—	—	—	—	—	—	—	—	—	—		Good to Be Bad
"All for Love"	2008	—	—	—	—	—	—	—	—	—	—		Good to Be Bad
"Summer Rain"	2008	—	—	—	—	—	—	—	—	—	—		Good to Be Bad
"Can You Hear the Wind Blow" [promo]	2008	—	—	—	—	—	—	—	—	—	—		Good to Be Bad
"Love Will Set You Free"	2011	—	—	—	—	—	—	—	—	—	—		Forevermore
"One of These Days"	2011	—	—	—	—	—	—	—	—	—	—		Forevermore
"Easier Said Than Done" [promo]	2012	—	—	—	—	—	—	—	—	—	—		Forevermore
"Stormbringer"	2015	—	—	—	—	—	—	—	—	—	—		The Purple Album
"Burn"	2015	—	—	—	—	—	—	—	—	—	—		The Purple Album
"Soldier of Fortune"	2015	—	—	—	—	—	—	—	—	—	—		The Purple Album
"Shut Up & Kiss Me"	2019	—	—	—	—	—	—	—	—	—	—		Flesh & Blood
"Trouble Is Your Middle Name"	2019	—	—	—	—	—	—	—	—	—	—		Flesh & Blood
"Hey You (You Make Me Rock)"	2019	—	—	—	—	—	—	—	—	—	—		Flesh & Blood
"Always & Forever"	2020	—	—	—	—	—	—	—	—	—	—		Flesh & Blood
"—" denotes a release that did not chart or was not issued in that region.

== Videos ==
=== Video albums ===
List of video albums, with selected chart positions and certifications
Title	Album details	Peak chart positions					Certifications
Title	Album details	UK	GER	JPN	SWI	US	Certifications
Fourplay	Released: 1983 / 1 February 1985 (US); Label: EMI/Picture Music; Format: VHS, LD	—	—	—	—	—	RIAA: Gold
Whitesnake Commandos	Released: 1983; Label: EMI/Picture Music; Formats: VHS, LD	—	—	—	—	—	
Super Rock '84 in Japan	Released: 1985; Label: Toho; Formats: VHS, LD	—	—	—	—	—	
Trilogy	Released: 17 November 1987; Label: Picture Music; Format: VHS, LD	—	—	—	—	3	RIAA: Platinum
Starkers in Tokyo	Released: 9 September 1997; Label: EMI; Format: LD	—	—	—	—	—	
Live... in the Still of the Night	Released: 7 February 2006; Label: Coming Home; Formats: DVD, DVD+CD	2	23	16	—	—	BPI: Gold; BVMI: Gold
Live at Donington 1990	Released: 20 May 2011; Label: Frontiers; Format: DVD	—	—	12	10	—	
Made in Japan	Released: 22 April 2013; Label: Frontiers; Formats: DVD, BD	5	—	54	2	—	
Live in '84: Back to the Bone	Released: 7 November 2014; Label: Frontiers; Format: DVD	37	—	12	—	—	
Unzipped ("Starkers" unplugged series in Tokyo, New York, Warsaw, Stockholm, Cologne, Sofia, Paris, Wolverhampton, Glasgow)	Released: 19 October 2018; Label: Rhino; Formats: DVD	—	—	—	—	—	
Greatest Hits: The Videos	Released: 2022; Label: Format: DVD, BD	—	—	—	—	—	
"—" denotes a release that did not chart or was not issued in that region.

=== Music videos ===
Title	Year	Director(s)	Ref.
"Ain't No Love in the Heart of the City"	1978	unknown	
"Come On"	1978	unknown	
"Bloody Mary"	1978	unknown	
"Lie Down (A Modern Love Song)"	1978	unknown	
"The Time Is Right For Love"	1978	unknown	
"Day Tripper"	1978	unknown	
"Long Way from Home"	1979	unknown	
"We Wish You Well"	1979	unknown	
"Fool for Your Loving"	1980	Lindsey Clennell	
"Don't Break My Heart Again"	1981	Lindsey Clennell	
"Would I Lie to You"	1981	unknown	
"Here I Go Again"	1982	Maurice Phillips	
"Guilty of Love"	1983	Lindsey Clennell	
"Give Me More Time"	1983	unknown	
"Love Ain't No Stranger"	1984	Mark Rezyka	
"Slow an' Easy"	1984	unknown	
"All or Nothing"	1985		
"Here I Go Again '87"	1987	Marty Callner	
"Is This Love"	1987	Marty Callner	
"Still of the Night"	1987	Marty Callner	
"Give Me All Your Love"	1988	Marty Callner	
"Fool for Your Loving '89"	1989	Marty Callner	
"The Deeper the Love"	1990	Marty Callner	
"Now You're Gone"	1990	Wayne Isham	
"Too Many Tears"	1997	unknown	
"Don't Fade Away"	1997	unknown	
"Anything You Want"	1998	unknown	
"Ready to Rock"	2006	unknown	
"If You Want Me"	2006	unknown	
"Lay Down Your Love"	2008	unknown	
"All For Love"	2008	unknown	
"Can You Hear The Wind Blow"	2008	unknown	
"Best Years"	2008		
"Love Will Set You Free"	2011	Daniel Nanasi	
"Easier Said Than Done"	2012		
"Forevermore"	2013	Made in Japan Fan Video	
"Steal Your Heart Away"	2013	Made in Japan Fan Video	
"Stormbringer"	2015	Tyler Bourns	
"Burn"	2015	Tyler Bourns	
"Soldier of Fortune"	2015	Tyler Bourns	
"Sail Away"	2015	Tyler Bourns	
"Lady Double Dealer"	2015	Tyler Bourns	
"The Gypsy"	2015	Tyler Bourns	
"Here I Go Again (Radio Mix)"	2017		
"Burn (Live)"	2018		
"Is This Love (2018 Video Remix)"	2018		
"Shut Up & Kiss Me"	2019	Tyler Bourns	
"Trouble Is Your Middle Name"	2019		
"Hey You (You Make Me Rock)"	2019		
"All or Nothing (Video Remix)"	2019		
"Sweet Lady Luck"	2019		
"Always The Same"	2020		
"Give Me All Your Love (2020 Video Remix)"	2020		
"Yours For The Asking"	2020		
"Steal Your Heart Away (Video Remix)"	2021		
"Lay Down Your Love (Video Remix)"	2021		
"Whipping Boy Blues"	2021		
"You're So Fine"	2021		
"All In The Name Of Love"	2021		
"Restless Heart"	2021		
"You're Gonna Break My Heart Again"	2022		
"Can You Hear The Wind Blow (Video Remix)"	2023		
"All I Want Is You"	2023		
"Call On Me"	2023		
"All For Love (Video Remix)"	2023		
"Lay Down, Stay Down"	2023		
"Midnight Blue"	2024		
"Wherever You May Go"	2024		
"Time & Again"	2024		
"Love Is Blind"	2024		
"River Song"	2024		
