= The Blues Album =

Compilation album by Whitesnake
- Released: 19 February 2021
- Genre: Hard rock, blues rock
- Length: 78:16
- Label: Rhino
- Producer: Michael McIntyre; David Coverdale (exec.)

Whitesnake chronology
Love Songs (2020)	The Blues Album (2021)	Greatest Hits: Revisited, Remixed, Remastered (2022)

Professional ratings
Review scores
Source	Rating
Classic Rock	3.5/5 stars

The Blues Album is a compilation album by British-American hard rock band Whitesnake, released on 19 February 2021 by Rhino Records. It reached Top 10 in Switzerland and Top 15 in Germany album charts.

The album contains "revisited, remixed and remastered" versions of previously released blues-hard rock songs, and is the third in a series called Red, White and Blues Trilogy following white's The Rock Album and red's Love Songs (2020).

== Content ==
According to the album's executive producer David Coverdale, some songs "have been musically embellished where my co-producer Michael McIntyre, my new mixer Christopher Collier and I felt it appropriate or necessary to bring out the best in these songs".

According to Coverdale "it's hard to find the words to show how profoundly they connected with my soul. But 'blues' to me is a beautiful word that describes emotional expression... feelings, be it feelings of sadness, loneliness, emptiness... but, also those that express great joy, celebration and dance, sexiness and Love!".

== Release and promotion ==
The Blues Album includes a more blues version of "Too Many Tears" (originally from Restless Heart) compared to Love Songs (which has a remix of Into the Light version), a song "If You Want Me" which was released in 2006 as a bonus track on live album Live... in the Shadow of the Blues, and "The River Song" originally intended by Coverdale for Coverdale–Page (1993) and released for David Coverdale's 2000 solo album Into the Light.

On band's official YouTube channel were released music videos for "Give Me All Your Love", "Whipping Boy Blues", "Lay Down Your Love", "Steal Your Heart Away", and "Slow An's Easy".

== Track listing ==
No.	Title	Original album	Length
1.	"Steal Your Heart Away (2020 Remix)"	Forevermore	5:19
2.	"Good To Be Bad (2020 Remix)"	Good to Be Bad	5:14
3.	"Give Me All Your Love (2020 Remix)"	Whitesnake	3:13
4.	"Take Me Back Again (2020 Remix)"	Restless Heart	6:23
5.	"Slow an' Easy (2020 Remix)"	Slide It In	6:09
6.	"Too Many Tears (2020 Remix)"	Restless Heart	5:45
7.	"Lay Down Your Love (2020 Remix)"	Good to Be Bad	6:11
8.	"The River Song (2020 Remix)"	Into the Light	6:37
9.	"Whipping Boy Blues (2020 Remix)"	Forevermore	5:39
10.	"If You Want Me (2020 Remix)"	Live... in the Shadow of the Blues	4:07
11.	"A Fool In Love (2020 Remix)"	Good to Be Bad	5:48
12.	"Woman Trouble Blues (2020 Remix)"	Restless Heart	5:42
13.	"Looking For Love (2020 Remix)"	Whitesnake	6:22
14.	"Crying in the Rain (2020 Remix)"	Whitesnake	5:48

== Charts ==
The vinyl LP charted on the UK Official Vinyl Albums Chart at the 18th position.

Chart performance for The Blues Album
Chart (2021)	Peak position
Austrian Albums (Ö3 Austria)	56
Belgian Albums (Ultratop Wallonia)	65
German Albums (Offizielle Top 100)	13
Japanese Albums (Oricon)	38
Japanese Hot Albums (Billboard Japan)	48
Scottish Albums (OCC)	4
Spanish Albums (Promusicae)	55
Swiss Albums (Schweizer Hitparade)	10
UK Albums (OCC)	57
UK Rock & Metal Albums (OCC)	2
