= Good to Be Bad =

Studio album by Whitesnake
- Released: 18 April 2008
- Recorded: 2007
- Studio: Casa DALA and Clear Lake Audio (Los Angeles, California); Snakebyte Studios (Lake Tahoe, Nevada)
- Genre: Hard rock
- Length: 59:14
- Label: SPV/Steamhammer; WEA (Japan)
- Producer: The Brutal Brothers: (David Coverdale; Doug Aldrich; Michael McIntyre)

Whitesnake chronology
Live: In the Shadow of the Blues (2006)	Good to Be Bad (2008)	30th Anniversary Collection (2008)

Singles from Good to Be Bad
- 1. "Lay Down Your Love" Released: 2008; 2. "All for Love" Released: 2008; 3. "Summer Rain" Released: 2008; 4. "Can You Hear the Wind Blow" Released: 2008

Alternate Cover
- Japanese expanded edition release (2011)

Alternate Cover
- Worldwide reissued release (2023)

Good to Be Bad is the tenth studio album by British-American hard rock band Whitesnake, released on 18 April 2008 in Germany, 21 April 2008 in Europe and 22 April in North America by SPV/Steamhammer. It was the band's first album of new studio material in a decade, since 1997's Restless Heart, not including the four new tracks recorded for the 2006 live album Live: In the Shadow of the Blues. The album was the first studio album to feature guitarists Reb Beach and Doug Aldrich. The album charted at number 62 on the Billboard 200 chart, number 8 on the Top Independent albums chart, number 23 on the Canadian Albums Chart and number 7 on the UK Albums Chart. As of sales in March 2011, the album sold over 700,000 copies worldwide, considered as unexpected as an independent label release.

The album contained three singles, "Lay Down Your Love", "All for Love", "Summer Rain", and one promotional single, "Can You Hear the Wind Blow". Despite being released through a hard rock independent label, alongside the album itself (with the exception of the Warner record label in Japan), all of the singles failed to chart.

On 28 April 2023, the album received a reissue by RHINO Entertainment under the name, Still...Good to Be Bad, similar to the 2011 expanded Japanese version. The reissue contained 2-LP remixes and remasters alongside alternate mixes and demo "Evolutions" tapes. The album was widely made available for streaming despite the majority of the songs from that album appeared on the "Red, White, and Blues" trilogy (2020's Love Songs and The Rock Album, and 2021's The Blues Album), respectively.

== Background ==
Ever since continuing their touring non-stop from 2003 to support the band's 25th anniversary, Whitesnake had signed into new a record contract with Steamhammer/SPV and released their 2006's Live... in the Shadow of the Blues live album, containing four songs which ended up on the album's tracklist. That apparently speculated that plans for a new Whitesnake album would be in business after which Coverdale planned to only tour for a short period of time with the band, asserting that it would be just "for fun." However, despite his claims, Coverdale decided to plan ahead in fact that the band was coming up with new material to a need for "new meat to bite into" in order to keep the touring "interesting".

== Production and composition ==
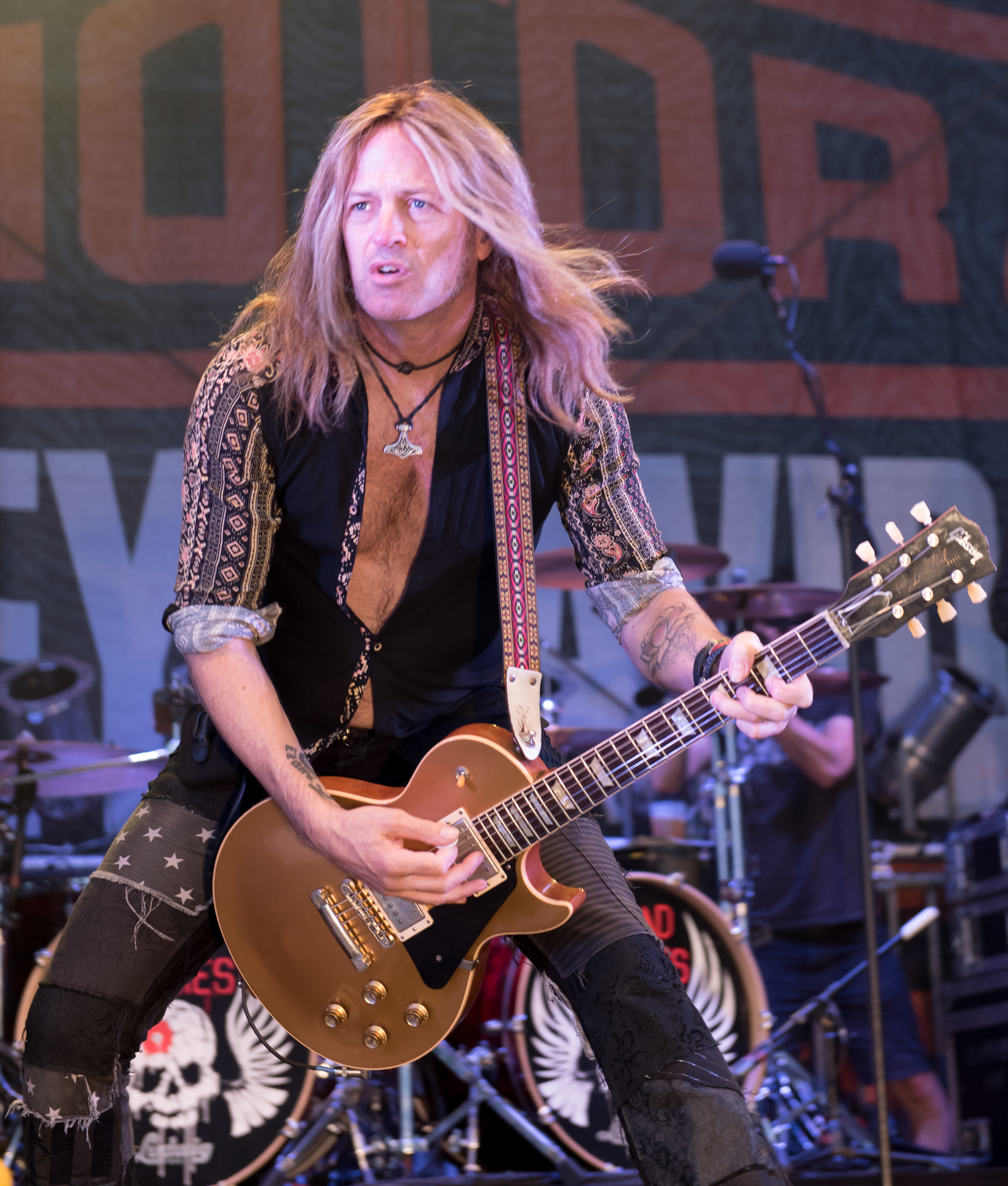
Doug Aldrich (pictured in 2017) co-wrote contributions to the majority of the album since his introduction in 2003.

Recording sessions reportedly began in early 2007 at Coverdale's residence in Lake Tahoe, Nevada (Snakebyte Studios), where the previous lineup had recorded 1997's Restless Heart album back in 1995. It was also recorded at Casa DALA and Clear Lake Audio in Los Angeles, California. Coverdale was joined by Doug Aldrich, who recently played with Dio, as they apparently talked about plans for the new album effortlessly, in which the band had felt the need to make music after an extensive touring load. Coverdale expressed his intellect towards Aldrich, previously a touring member of the band since 2003, as the two have a fruitful working relationship with each other, as stated in an official interview:

He is a very gifted individual and very enthusiastic. He also helped engineer & mix the record, so he was involved from the very beginning of the project to the end. That is something that has never happened before. Doug’s a welcome breath of fresh air for me. He doesn’t bring any excess baggage. No questionable agenda and no unnecessary ego to stroke. He just gets on with it. He’s very caring and passionate about what he does, and thank goodness, the passion includes Whitesnake. He was exposed to Whitesnake before we met, or worked together, so, he was familiar with the approach and the creative identities I’d established, but, he brings such an incredible energy and urgency to Whitesnake that it helps stretch the boundaries much further, without compromising the original attitude. He’s an electrifying guitarist, as anyone who has seen him can testify. Very inspiring to me. The other bonus, of course, is that we’ve developed a strong, supportive personal friendship…

After wrapping up ideas for the album, the band rehearsed and started recording with the rest of the current touring members with secondary session guitarist Reb Beach, drummer Chris Frazier, keyboardist Timothy Drury, and bassist Uriah Duffy. Coverdale, Aldrich, and McIntyre produced and mixed the album themselves, while it was mastered by David Donnelly.

The album was slated to be originally released in the summer of 2007. However, the band was still touring extensively throughout the rest of the summer, citing that every major city in the United States headlined the band "every night of the week this season." Despite the delays, Coverdale stated that it was not a big deal for the band to release it at this time, and objected "that there was no real rush for us to finish the project quickly," feeling that he would rather take a year off from touring in attempt to resort the pressure from making the record. This resulted on delays for the recording and production schedule that was meant to be finalized, but it wasn't a major problem to Coverdale. The band tentatively pushed its date ahead to October 2007 and then May 2008. The album was, however, in fact released on April, a month earlier than its anticipated May release date. At that same timeframe, Whitesnake reissued their ground-breaking eponymous album in respect of its 20th anniversary in May and June 2007 through EMI.

In December 2007, Tommy Aldridge had left the group due to pursuing "alternate musical adventures". Aldridge was replaced by Chris Frazier, who previously was called up into the touring lineup to re-record some of the tracks that Aldridge appeared on the four new tracks recorded for the 2006 live album but also played on the full-length album. Aldridge won't return to the band until January 2013, where the band has also parted ways with Brian Tichy after that.

== Release and promotion ==
Good to Be Bad was released on 18 April 2008 in Germany, 21 April for the rest of Europe, and 22 April in North America. The album peaked at number 7 at their native UK chart and finished at the top spot for the UK Rock & Metal albums chart with opening sales around 13,000 copies. In the US, it debuted at number 70 on the Billboard 200 by the end of April, selling only 8,000 copies. It eventually peaked at number 62 as its "first-week" on 10 May, but at number eight on the Independent Albums Chart. In total, the album charted in 19 countries, with Finland and Norway charting the highest at number 5. The album only peaked in the US Billboard Top 200 prior to its release and spent 3 weeks there; however, it also spent 5 weeks in the Independent Albums chart. The record sold more than 74,000 copies worldwide in its first week of release. Nielsen Soundscan initially reported its first week sales in the United States around 28,000 copies as of 8 May 2008. The album only sold around 700,000 copies by 2011, implying the fact that it charted lower in the US from a minor independent label as a factor. Despite earning no sales certification for an independent release, it was considered a comeback album since the release of 1997's Restless Heart as a "David Coverdale & Whitesnake" moniker previously in over a decade. Coverdale believed that the poor sales in the United States were due to inadequate promotion, compounded by the fact that the record label was on the verge of bankruptcy at the time. On its 2023 reissue, it sold 770 copies within the first week of its release in the US.

=== Reissues ===
On 7 September 2011, Warner Japan released an expanded album version under the name Still... Good to Be Bad exclusive to Japan only. The expanded Japanese reissue consisted of 4 bonus tracks from the previous live album Live... in the Shadow of the Blues with the drum tracks only to be re-recorded by Chris Frazier. It also contained a bonus DVD that featured the band performing at Cutting Room in New York City on 10 April 2008, with two music videos (Ready to Rock & Lay Down Your Love), the whole 2006 live album performance, and an exclusive interview of the album followed by a slideshow that plays the acoustic version of Summer Rain. Another version of this album was reissued on 24 April 2013 with the Japanese tour included.

On 24 February 2023, Whitesnake and Rhino Entertainment announced the album reissue to celebrate its original 15th anniversary respectively on remixes and remastered versions on the album in 4-CD and 2-LP formats, along with previously unreleased material with former and current band members' mixes and their demo "Evolutions" released on 28 April 2023. The songs also contained new mixes featuring Hook City Harlots (Cami Thompson, Misty Rae & Jackie Landrum) and "Hook City Horns" (Rick Metz on saxes and Joshua Reed on trumpet), both recorded with the 2023 remix overridden with it. The album cover art is similar to the original release but the track listing and the album title still holds the previous 2011 Japan reissue with bonus tracks taken from their previous live album Live... in the Shadow of the Blues. A 2008–2009 world tour box set was included in Blu-Ray format.

Whitesnake has premiered new videos published on YouTube for "Can You Hear the Wind Blow", "All I Want is You", "Call on Me", "Lay Down Your Love", and "All for Love", taken from the 2023 reissue.

== Touring ==
=== Promo tour: before the release ===
Right before the release, the album's promotional tour began on 23 March 2008 in Wellington, New Zealand at Westpac Stadium right until they hit the brakes at Thebarton Theatre, Adelaide, Australia on 31 March 2008. Coverdale and Aldrich later performed at the Cutting Room in New York City on 10 April by singing an acoustic version of "Can You Hear the Wind Blow", "Lay Down Your Love", and "All I Want, All I Need." The whole performance was later included in the 2018 Unzipped complication box set as "Starkers." The band took a touring hiatus for over a month to announce tour dates after the album's release.

=== 2008 Good to Be Bad world tour ===
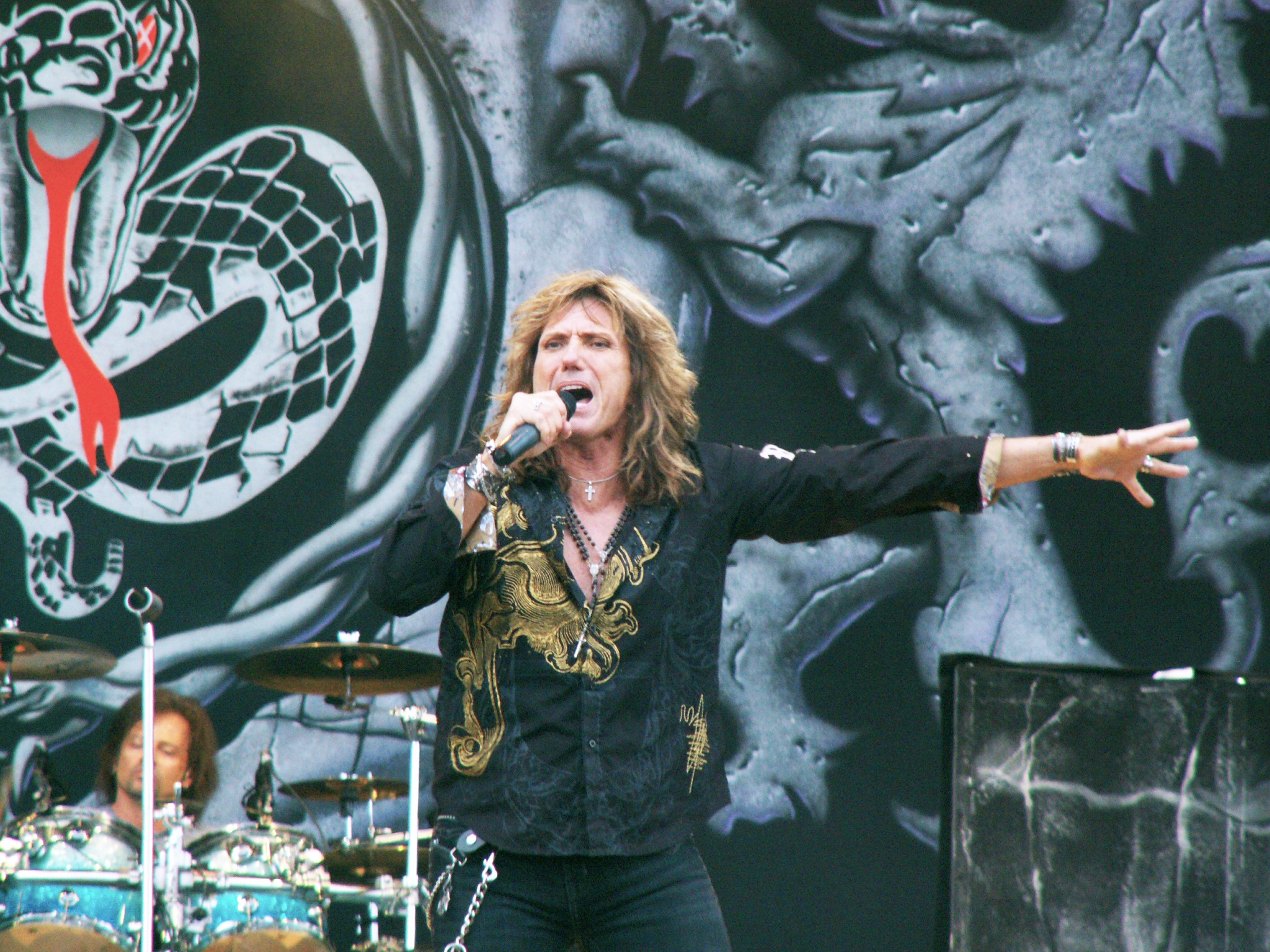
David Coverdale performing with Whitesnake at the 2008 Arrow Rock Festival, Nijmegen, Netherlands

The Good to Be Bad tour resumed at Manaus, Brazil on 3 May 2008 and later went on to forty countries followed by South America, Europe, and Japan, respectively. During the summer of 2008, the band co-headlined in Sweden Rock Festival dated from 4–7 June. They also toured with Def Leppard (consisting of former Whitesnake's lead guitarist from 1987 to 1988, Vivian Campbell) in the UK supported alongside Thunder and Black Stone Cherry, both respectively toured for each of the two leg sets, first at Glasgow SECC on 17 June, lasting for about a month until 17 July at Nottingham at Motorpoint Arena. Whitesnake also co-headlined with Alice Cooper from 18 November through the first day of December. Former Whitesnake band member Adrian Vandenberg was guested on two concerts, on 15 June at Arrow Rock Festival located at Nijmegen and at Tilburg (concluding the tour) on 20 December, both of which happened during the 2008 Good to Be Bad tour. The band then again took a six-month touring hiatus to recuperate for the upcoming 2009 Still... Good to Be Bad tour.

=== 2009 Still... Good to Be Bad European tour ===
Whitesnake went on for the very next extra leg set for the album's tour on 21 May 2009 at Sandnes, Norway. The set then followed to further western European countries like Finland, Sweden, Denmark, Luxembourg, France, the Netherlands, Belgium, and Ireland, respectively. The tour set ended on 14 June 2009 at Download Festival in Donington Park, United Kingdom.

== Reception ==
Professional ratings
Review scores
Source	Rating
About.com	3.5/5 stars
AllMusic	4/5 stars
Classic Rock	3.5/5 stars
The Guardian	3/5 stars
IGN	(8.1/10)
Metal.de	7/10
Metal Hammer (Germany)	6/7
Metal Storm	8/10 stars
PopMatters	6/10 stars
Record Collector	4/5 stars
Rock Hard	8/10

Overall reviews for the album, are mainly positive. IGN's Jim Kaz favorably described the album: "a well-worn leather jacket, Good To Be Bad has a warm familiarity about it that just feels right [...] has enough shining, mega-rock moments to endear itself to fans old and new. Without posturing or pretension, it just rocks."

AllMusic's Thom Jurek initially expressed his support for the album stating, "his (Coverdale's) brand of ROCK with chugging outsized guitars is palatable because of his reliance on crafting excellent choruses and hooks. It's a hell of a comeback and ranks right near the top of the Whitesnake catalog," but cited a minor setback, "it seems strange that such a timeless sound has vanished from mainstream rock -- guitars just don't sound like this on records anymore." Despite this, he positively rated the album 4/5.

Classic Rock's Philip Wilding mildly gave out a mixed review on the album's Still... Good to Be Bad re-release, giving it a 3.5 out of 5. He stated about the album: "was something of an unexpected gem for those who had given up on the band returning to their original soul and blues roots. [...] Even when Coverdale's vocal slips off-key, the recording doesn’t spare the singer’s blushes. It’s not ever likely to be the first thing you turn to on this hefty reissue, but it’s guaranteed to be the disc [Disc 4 called 'Evolution'] that will keep bringing you back for more." Good to Be Bad was placed the second-best album throughout their entire discography in a ranking by Michael Gallucci.

=== Awards ===
Good to Be Bad won the Classic Rock Award for "Album of the Year" in November 2008. The band was also honored for the "Best Album of The Year" with the 2008 Dino Award in The Dinosaur Rock Guitar forum.

Similarly, the album's worldwide reissue was ranked 17th by Dig! magazine (part of Warner) among the "Best reissues of 2023: 20 Essential box set and vinyl releases."

== Track listing ==
All tracks are written by David Coverdale and Doug Aldrich, except where noted.

No.	Title	Length
1.	"Best Years"	5:16
2.	"Can You Hear the Wind Blow"	5:03
3.	"Call on Me"	5:01
4.	"All I Want, All I Need"	5:40
5.	"Good to Be Bad"	5:13
6.	"All for Love"	5:13
7.	"Summer Rain"	6:10
8.	"Lay Down Your Love"	6:01
9.	"A Fool in Love"	5:50
10.	"Got What You Need"	4:15
11.	"'Til the End of Time"	5:32

Japanese bonus tracks
No.	Title	Length
11.	"All for Love" (Doug Aldrich guitar solo)	5:20
12.	"Summer Rain" (Acoustic version)	5:21

European Bonus Disc
No.	Title	Writer(s)	Length
1.	"Summer Rain" (Acoustic version)		5:21
2.	"All I Want All I Need" (Radio edit)		3:58
3.	"Take Me with You" (Live)	Coverdale, Micky Moody	7:51
4.	"Ready to Rock" (Enhanced video)		4:19

US/Canadian bonus CD; All tracks taken from Live: In the Shadow of the Blues
No.	Title	Writer(s)	Length
1.	"Burn – Stormbringer" (Live)	Coverdale, Ritchie Blackmore, Glenn Hughes Jon Lord, Ian Paice	8:38
2.	"Give Me All Your Love" (Live)	Coverdale, John Sykes	4:27
3.	"Walking in the Shadow of the Blues" (Live)	Coverdale, Bernie Marsden	5:10
4.	"The Deeper the Love" (Live)	Coverdale, Adrian Vandenberg	4:32
5.	"Ready & Willing" (Live)	Coverdale, Moody, Neil Murray, Lord, Paice	5:41
6.	"Don't Break My Heart Again" (Live)	Coverdale	6:08
7.	"Take Me with You" (Live)	Coverdale, Moody	7:50
8.	"Ready to Rock" (Enhanced video)		4:19

Still Good to Be Bad (CD/DVD 2011 Japanese Expanded Special Edition)
No.	Title	Length
1.	"Best Years"	5:16
2.	"Can You Hear the Wind Blow"	5:03
3.	"Lay Down Your Love"	6:01
4.	"If You Want Me" (Re-recorded with Chris Frazier on drums)	4:08
5.	"All I Want All I Need"	5:40
6.	"Call on Me"	5:01
7.	"Ready to Rock" (Re-recorded with Chris Frazier on drums)	4:19
8.	"Summer Rain"	6:10
9.	"Good to Be Bad"	5:13
10.	"All for Love"	5:13
11.	"All I Want Is You" (Re-recorded with Chris Frazier on drums)	4:12
12.	"Got What You Need"	4:15
13.	"A Fool in Love"	5:50
14.	"Dog" (Re-recorded with Chris Frazier on drums)	3:27
15.	"'Til the End of Time"	5:32

Bonus DVD - Still Good to Be Bad
No.	Title	Writer(s)	Length
1.	"Ready to Rock" (Music video)
2.	"Lay Down Your Love" (Music video)
3.	"Give Me All Your Love" (Cutting Room NY acoustic performance)	Coverdale, John Sykes
4.	"Can You Hear the Wind Blow" (Cutting Room NY acoustic performance)
5.	"All I Want All I Need" (Cutting Room NY acoustic performance)
6.	"Lay Down Your Love" (Cutting Room NY acoustic performance)
7.	"Fool for Your Loving" (Cutting Room NY acoustic performance)	Coverdale, Moody, Marsden
8.	"The Deeper the Love" (Cutting Room NY acoustic performance)	Coverdale, Vandenberg
9.	"Ain't No Love in the Heart of the City" (Cutting Room NY acoustic performance)	Michael Price, Dan Walsh
10.	"Here I Go Again" (Cutting Room NY acoustic performance)	Coverdale, Marsden
11.	"Good to Be Bad interview"
12.	"Live in the Shadow of the Blues" (EPK)
13.	"Slideshow (featuring "Summer Rain" acoustic version)"

Still... Good To Be Bad (15th Anniversary Edition)

Disc 1: 2023 Remix
No.	Title	Length
1.	"Best Years"	5:15
2.	"Can You Hear the Wind Blow"	5:23
3.	"Lay Down Your Love"	6:10
4.	"All I Want, All I Need"	5:40
5.	"Call on Me"	5:00
6.	"All for Love"	5:11
7.	"Good to Be Bad"	5:09
8.	"Summer Rain"	6:23
9.	"If You Want Me"	4:08
10.	"Got What You Need"	4:14
11.	"Dog"	3:27
12.	"All I Want Is You"	4:44
13.	"A Fool in Love"	5:45
14.	"Ready to Rock"	4:27
15.	"'Til the End of Time"	5:21
Total length:		76:17

Disc 2: 2023 Remaster
No.	Title	Length
1.	"Best Years"	5:16
2.	"Can You Hear the Wind Blow"	5:04
3.	"Lay Down Your Love"	6:02
4.	"If You Want Me" (Re-recorded with Chris Frazier on drums)	4:09
5.	"All I Want, All I Need"	5:42
6.	"Call on Me"	5:03
7.	"Ready to Rock" (Re-recorded with Chris Frazier on drums)	4:29
8.	"Summer Rain"	6:11
9.	"Good to Be Bad"	5:15
10.	"All for Love"	5:15
11.	"All I Want Is You" (Re-recorded with Chris Frazier on drums)	4:36
12.	"Got What You Need"	4:16
13.	"A Fool in Love"	5:49
14.	"Dog" (Re-recorded with Chris Frazier on drums)	3:27
15.	"'Til the End of Time"	5:36
Total length:		76:10

Disc 3: With Hook City Harlots (Tracks 1–7) & Alternate Mixes (Tracks 8–13); All taken from the 2023 Remix
No.	Title	Length
1.	"Lay Down Your Love"	6:09
2.	"Call On Me"	5:01
3.	"All for Love"	5:11
4.	"Good To Be Bad"	5:09
5.	"If You Want Me" (with Hook City Horns)	4:08
6.	"Got What You Need"	4:15
7.	"A Fool In Love"	5:47
8.	"Dog" (Re-recorded with Tommy Aldridge on drums)	3:27
9.	"All I Want Is You" (Re-recorded with Tommy Aldridge on drums)	4:44
10.	"Ready to Rock" (Re-recorded with Tommy Aldridge on drums)	4:28
11.	"If You Want Me" (Re-recorded with Tommy Aldridge on drums)	4:08
12.	"All For Love" (Doug Aldrich Alternate Solo)	5:13
13.	"Summer Rain" (Unzipped)	6:23
Total length:		64:03

Disc 4: Evolutions
No.	Title	Length
1.	"Best Years"	6:01
2.	"Can You Hear the Wind Blow"	5:41
3.	"Lay Down Your Love"	5:49
4.	"All I Want, All I Need"	5:44
5.	"Call on Me"	5:09
6.	"All for Love"	5:43
7.	"Good to Be Bad"	5:00
8.	"Summer Rain"	4:39
9.	"If You Want Me"	4:07
10.	"Got What You Need"	4:27
11.	"Dog"	3:28
12.	"All I Want Is You"	5:11
13.	"A Fool in Love"	5:46
14.	"Ready to Rock"	4:17
15.	"'Til the End of Time"	5:53
Total length:		76:55

== Personnel ==
Credits are adapted from the album's liner notes.

Whitesnake

- David Coverdale — vocals
- Doug Aldrich — guitars, backing vocals
- Reb Beach — guitars, backing vocals
- Timothy Drury — keyboards, backing vocals
- Uriah Duffy — bass, backing vocals
- Chris Frazier — drums

Additional personnel (2023 Alternate mixes)

- Tommy Aldridge — drums (Bonus tracks from Live: In the Shadow of the Blues, re-recorded remixes)
- Cami Thompson — backing vocals (Hook City Harlots)
- Misty Rae — backing vocals (Hook City Harlots)
- Jackie Landrum — backing vocals (Hook City Harlots)
- Rick Metz — saxes
- Joshua Reed — trumpet

Production

- Coverdale, Aldrich, Michael McIntyre (The Brutal Brothers) — producer, engineer, mixing
- David Donnelly — mastering (at DNA, Los Angeles)
- Mike Tacci — engineering
- Preston Boebel — assistant engineering

Design

- Hugh Gilmour — artwork design & linear notes

Management

- David Weise — business management
- Jeffery Light — legal affairs
- Myman Abell Fineman Fox — legal affairs
- Rod MacSween — agent

Reissue

- Nik Rosales — assistant engineering
- Christopher Collier — mixing (2023 remix); backing vocals
- Tom Gordon — mixing (2023 remix); producer
- Scott Hull — remastering (at Masterdisk, Peekskill, New York)
- Rob Gross — product manager
- Kristin Attaway — production & packaging manager
- William Hames — studio photography
- Sheryl Farber — additional editorial
- John Srebalus — additional editorial
- Tom Gordon — additional editorial

== Charts ==
=== Weekly charts ===
2008 weekly chart performance for Good to Be Bad
Chart (2008)	Peak position
Austrian Albums (Ö3 Austria)	11
Belgian Albums (Ultratop Flanders)	70
Belgian Albums (Ultratop Wallonia)	75
Brazil Charts	36
Canadian Albums (Billboard)	23
Danish Albums (Hitlisten)	18
Dutch Albums (Album Top 100)	33
Finnish Albums (Suomen virallinen lista)	5
French Albums (SNEP)	69
German Albums (Offizielle Top 100)	6
Hungarian Albums (MAHASZ)	8
Irish Albums (IRMA)	95
Italian Albums (FIMI)	57
Japanese Albums (Oricon)	12
Norwegian Albums (VG-lista)	5
Scottish Albums (Official Charts)	6
Swedish Albums (Sverigetopplistan)	10
Swiss Albums (Schweizer Hitparade)	15
UK Albums (Official Charts)	7
UK Rock & Metal Albums (Official Charts)	1
US Billboard 200	62
US Independent Albums (Billboard)	8
US Top Hard Rock Albums (Billboard)	7
US Top Rock Albums (Billboard)	18

2023 weekly chart performance for Good to Be Bad and 15th-anniversary
Chart (2023)	Peak position
Japanese Albums (Oricon)	43
Japanese Hot Albums (Billboard Japan)	58
UK Rock & Metal Albums (OCC)	12

== Release history ==
Release formats for Good to Be Bad
Region	Date	Label	Format
Germany	18 April 2008	SPV/Steamhammer	LP
Europe	21 April 2008	SPV/Steamhammer	CD
US	22 April 2008	SPV/Steamhammer	CD
Japan	23 April 2008	WEA	CD
Japan	7 September 2011	WEA	CD; DVD
Japan	24 April 2013	WEA	CD; DVD
Various	28 April 2023	Rhino	CD; digital download; streaming; LP; Blu-ray DVD
Japan	17 May 2023	Rhino	SHM-CD; Blu-ray DVD
