= Love Songs (Whitesnake album) =

Compilation album by Whitesnake
- Released: 6 November 2020
- Genre: Hard rock, blues rock, heavy metal, glam metal
- Length: 78:02
- Label: Rhino
- Producer: Michael McIntyre; David Coverdale (exec.)

Whitesnake chronology
The Rock Album (2020)	Love Songs (2020)	The Blues Album (2021)

Love Songs is a compilation album by British-American rock band Whitesnake, released on 6 November 2020 by Rhino Records. The album contains "revisited, remixed and remastered" versions of previously released songs, and is the second in a series called Red, White and Blues Trilogy following The Rock Album (2020) and followed by The Blues Album (2021). Compared to other two compilation, this one did not manage to chart on the UK Albums Chart, but it topped the UK Rock & Metal Albums Chart.

== Content ==
According to the album's executive producer David Coverdale, some songs "have been musically embellished where my co-producer Michael McIntyre, my new mixer Christopher Collier and I felt it appropriate or necessary to bring out the best in these songs."

Love Songs includes the previously unreleased songs "With All of My Heart", "Let's Talk It Over" and "Yours for the Asking" which features a music video, all originally recorded for David Coverdale's 2000 solo album Into the Light.

== Commercial performance ==
In the United States, Love Songs sold only 1,425 copies within the first week of release.

== Track listing ==
No.	Title	Original album	Length
1.	"Love Will Set You Free (2020 Remix)"	Forevermore	4:07
2.	"The Deeper the Love (2020 Remix)"	Slip of the Tongue	4:01
3.	"All I Want, All I Need (2020 Remix)"	Good to Be Bad	5:41
4.	"Too Many Tears (2020 Remix)"	Into the Light	6:09
5.	"Can't Go On (2020 Remix)"	Restless Heart	4:30
6.	"Is This Love (2020 Remix)"	Whitesnake	5:04
7.	"With All of My Heart (2020 Remix)"	Previously unreleased-Into the Light	5:36
8.	"Summer Rain (2020 Remix)"	Good to Be Bad	6:01
9.	"Your Precious Love (2020 Remix)"	Restless Heart	4:33
10.	"Now You're Gone (2020 Remix)"	Slip of the Tongue	4:11
11.	"Don't You Cry (2020 Remix)"	Into the Light	5:30
12.	"Midnight Blue (2020 Remix)"	Into the Light	4:48
13.	"Easier Said Than Done (2020 Remix)"	Forevermore	4:14
14.	"Yours for the Asking (2020 Remix)"	Previously unreleased-Into the Light	4:29
15.	"Let's Talk It Over (2020 Remix)"	Previously unreleased-Into the Light	8:08

== Charts ==
The vinyl LP charted on the UK Official Vinyl Albums Chart at the 33rd position.

Chart performance for Love Songs
Chart (2020)	Peak position
Belgian Albums (Ultratop Wallonia)	97
German Albums (Offizielle Top 100)	66
Hungarian Albums (MAHASZ)	11
Japanese Albums (Oricon)	48
Japanese Hot Albums (Billboard Japan)	63
Portuguese Albums (AFP)	37
Scottish Albums (Official Charts)	25
Swiss Albums (Schweizer Hitparade)	34
UK Rock & Metal Albums (Official Charts)	1
