= The Rock Album =

Compilation album by Whitesnake
- Released: 19 June 2020
- Genre: Hard rock, blues rock, heavy metal, glam metal
- Length: 78:10
- Label: Rhino
- Producer: Michael McIntyre; David Coverdale (exec.)

Whitesnake chronology
Flesh & Blood (2019)	The Rock Album (2020)	Love Songs (2020)

Singles from The Rock Album
- 1. "Always the Same" Released: 16 April 2020

Professional ratings
Review scores
Source	Rating
Classic Rock	5/5 stars

The Rock Album is a compilation album by British-American rock band Whitesnake, released on 19 June 2020 through Rhino Records. The album contains "revisited, remixed and remastered" versions of previously released songs, and is the first in a series called Red, White and Blues Trilogy including also red's Love Songs (2020) and blue's The Blues Album (2021).

== Content ==
According to the album's executive producer David Coverdale, some songs "have been musically embellished where my co-producer Michael McIntyre, my new mixer Christopher Collier and I felt it appropriate or necessary to bring out the best in these songs."

The Rock Album includes a new song, "Always the Same", originally recorded for the band's 2019 album Flesh & Blood.

== Commercial performance ==
In the United States, The Rock Album sold 1,625 copies in the first week of release, and 500 copies on the following week.

== Track listing ==
No.	Title	Original release	Length
1.	"Still of the Night (2020 Remix)"	Whitesnake	6:49
2.	"Best Years (2020 Remix)"	Good to Be Bad	5:16
3.	"Tell Me How (2020 Remix)"	Forevermore	5:28
4.	"Love Ain't No Stranger (2020 Remix)"	Slide It In	4:15
5.	"All or Nothing (2020 Remix)"	Slide It In	3:48
6.	"Give Me All Your Love (2020 Remix)"	Whitesnake	3:27
7.	"Can You Hear the Wind Blow (2020 Remix)"	Good to Be Bad	5:07
8.	"Restless Heart (2020 Remix)"	Restless Heart	4:52
9.	"Anything You Want (2020 Remix)"	Restless Heart	4:12
10.	"Here I Go Again (2020 Remix)"	Whitesnake	4:32
11.	"Judgement Day (2020 Remix)"	Slip of the Tongue	5:19
12.	"She Give Me (2020 Remix)"	Into the Light	4:12
13.	"Crying (2020 Remix)"	Restless Heart	5:39
14.	"Can't Stop Now (2020 Remix)"	Restless Heart	3:26
15.	"Always the Same (2020 Remix)"	Previously unreleased-Flesh & Blood	4:46
16.	"Forevermore (2020 Remix)"	Forevermore	7:07

== Charts ==
The vinyl LP charted on the UK Official Vinyl Albums Chart at the 39th position.

Chart performance for The Rock Album
Chart (2020)	Peak position
Belgian Albums (Ultratop Wallonia)	89
German Albums (Offizielle Top 100)	40
Hungarian Albums (MAHASZ)	11
Japanese Albums (Oricon)	28
Japanese Hot Albums (Billboard Japan)	36
Portuguese Albums (AFP)	44
Scottish Albums (Official Charts)	11
Swiss Albums (Schweizer Hitparade)	36
UK Albums (Official Charts)	81
UK Rock & Metal Albums (Official Charts)	2

== Credits ==
Credits are adapted from the complication album's liner notes. For original album credits, see Slide It In, 1987, Slip of the Tongue, Restless Heart, Into the Light, Good to Be Bad, Forevermore

Whitesnake (Always the Same)

(see Flesh & Blood credits)

- David Coverdale – vocals
- Reb Beach – guitar
- Joel Hoekstra – guitar
- Michael Devin – bass guitar
- Tommy Aldridge – drums
- Michele Luppi – keyboards, backing vocals

Technical (Always the Same)

- Michael McIntyre – engineering & recording
- Christopher 'Muffin Man' Collier – mixing & mastering
- Scott Hull – mastering (at Masterdisk, New York)

Management

- David Coverdale — executive producer
- Michael McIntyre — producer
- Hugh Gilmour — A&R

Technical

- Christopher 'Muffin Man' Collier – remixing & mastering
- Scott Hull — remastering
- Tom Gordon — 2nd engineer & QC
- Jeremiah Wynn — 2nd engineer & QC

Design

- Hugh Gilmour — art direction, design

Other

- Brian Dodd — product manager
- Ellys Airey — production & packaging manager
