= Made in Japan (Whitesnake album) =

Live album by Whitesnake

Live album by Whitesnake
- Released: 22 April 2013
- Recorded: Loud Park Festival, Saitama Super Arena, Japan, 15 October 2011
- Genres: Hard rock, heavy metal
- Length: 113:06
- Label: Frontiers
- Producers: David Coverdale, Doug Aldrich, Michael McIntyre

Whitesnake chronology
Live at Donington 1990 (2011)	Made in Japan (2013)	The Purple Album (2015)

Made in Japan

Video by Whitesnake
- Released: 22 April 2013
- Recorded: Loud Park Festival, Saitama Super Arena, Japan, 15 October 2011
- Genres: Hard rock, heavy metal
- Label: Frontiers
- Director: Nanami Ono
- Producers: Devin DeHaven, Michael McIntyre, David Coverdale, Yusuke Maeda

Whitesnake video albums chronology
Live at Donington 1990 (2011)	Made in Japan (2013)	Live in 1984: Back to the Bone (2014)

Professional ratings
Review scores
Source	Rating
AllMusic	3.5/5 stars

Made in Japan is a live album by English hard rock band Whitesnake. It was recorded at Saitama Super Arena in Saitama, Saitama during the Loud Park Festival. It was released on 3 April 2013 in Japan, 19 April in Europe 22 April UK and 23 April in the US.

The album was released as a Blu-ray, a single DVD set, a 2CD/DVD digipack.

It received a reissue in the group's live boxset Access All Areas: Live on 25 April 2025.

== Track listings ==
Disc one
No.	Title	Length
1.	"Best Years"	6:29
2.	"Give Me All Your Love"	4:51
3.	"Love Ain't No Stranger"	4:23
4.	"Is This Love"	4:23
5.	"Steal Your Heart Away"	7:14
6.	"Forevermore"	6:55
7.	"Six String Showdown"	6:00
8.	"Love Will Set You Free"	4:34
9.	"Drum Solo"	7:31
10.	"Fool for Your Loving"	4:50
11.	"Here I Go Again"	6:01
12.	"Still of the Night"	10:36

Disc two - Soundcheck
No.	Title	Length
1.	"Love Will Set You Free"	5:07
2.	"Steal Your Heart Away"	6:39
3.	"Fare Thee Well" (Acoustic version)	4:47
4.	"One of These Days" (Acoustic version)	4:16
5.	"Lay Down Your Love"	6:45
6.	"Evil Ways"	6:18
7.	"Good to Be Bad" (Acoustic version)	3:16
8.	"Tell Me How" (Acoustic version)	4:11

Japanese edition bonus tracks
No.	Title	Length
9.	"Best Years"
10.	"The Badger" (Demo session)

Blu-Ray and DVD
No.	Title	Length
1.	"Best Years"
2.	"Give Me All Your Love"
3.	"Love Ain't No Stranger"
4.	"Is This Love"
5.	"Steal Your Heart Away"
6.	"Forevermore"
7.	"Six String Show Down"
8.	"Love Will Set You Free"
9.	"Drum Solo"
10.	"Fool for Your Loving"
11.	"Here I Go Again"
12.	"Still of the Night"
13.	"Forevermore" (fan video)
14.	"Steal Your Heart Away" (fan video)

== Personnel ==
=== Whitesnake ===
- David Coverdale - lead vocals
- Doug Aldrich - guitar, backing vocals
- Reb Beach - guitar, backing vocals
- Michael Devin - bass, backing vocals
- Brian Tichy - drums, backing vocals

=== Guest musicians ===
- Brian Ruedy - keyboards, backing vocals

== Charts ==
Chart (2013)	Peak position
Austrian Albums (Ö3 Austria)	54
Belgian Albums (Ultratop Flanders)	108
Belgian Albums (Ultratop Wallonia)	59
German Albums (Offizielle Top 100)	26
Scottish Albums (Official Charts)	61
Swiss Albums (Schweizer Hitparade)	99
UK Albums (Official Charts)	67
UK Rock & Metal Albums (Official Charts)	5
UK Independent Albums (Official Charts)	9
US Independent Albums (Billboard)	43
US Top Hard Rock Albums (Billboard)	24
