= Live at Donington 1990 =

Live album by Whitesnake

Live album by Whitesnake
- Released: 20 May 2011
- Recorded: 18 August 1990 at the Monsters of Rock festival, Castle Donington, UK
- Genre: Hard rock
- Length: 103:00
- Labels: Frontiers; Columbia Music Entertainment; RHINO (reissue)
- Producer: David Coverdale

Whitesnake chronology
| Forevermore (2011) | Live at Donington 1990 (2011) | Made in Japan (2013) |

Live at Donington 1990

Video by Whitesnake
- Released: 20 May 2011
- Recorded: 18 August 1990 at the Monsters of Rock festival, Castle Donington, UK
- Genres: Heavy metal, hard rock
- Length: 125 min.
- Labels: Frontiers; Columbia Music Entertainment (Japan); RHINO (reissue)
- Producer: David Coverdale

Whitesnake video albums chronology
| Live... In the Still of the Night (2006) | Live at Donington 1990 (2011) | Made in Japan (2013) |

Professional ratings
Review scores
| Source | Rating |
|---|---|
| AllMusic | 3.5/5 stars |
| Blabbermouth.net | 8/10 stars |
| Metal Hammer (Germany) | 6/7 |

Live at Donington 1990 is a live album by English hard rock band Whitesnake. It was recorded at Castle Donington on 18 August 1990 during the Monsters of Rock festival, which the band headlined. It was released on 20 May 2011 in Japan, 3 June in Europe and 7 June in the US.

== Background ==
The band was performing with a modern sound system during the tour, which ensured an impressive sound quality, and the concert was broadcast live by BBC Radio. Widely bootlegged, fans requested the release of the footage of the concert through a mobilization on the group's website, as well as professional audio of the show. The album was released as a 2-CD set, a single DVD set, a 2CD/DVD digipack, vinyl and as a digital edition.

In 2019, the same live album was released along with the reissued 1989 Slip of the Tongue 30th-anniversary boxset with some audio clips being reduced to fit in an appropriate disc set. A 30th-anniversary remastered edition of the album was released in August 2020 without any cuts.

== Track listing ==
Disc one
| No. | Title | Writer(s) | Length |
|---|---|---|---|
| 1. | "Slip of the Tongue" | David Coverdale, Adrian Vandenberg | 6:52 |
| 2. | "Slide It In" | Coverdale | 5:02 |
| 3. | "Judgement Day" | Coverdale, Vandenberg | 5:55 |
| 4. | "Slow an' Easy" | Coverdale, Micky Moody | 8:11 |
| 5. | "Kittens Got Claws" | Coverdale, Vandenberg | 4:58 |
| 6. | "Adagio for Strato" | Vandenberg | 3:00 |
| 7. | "Flying Dutchman Boogie" | Vandenberg | 3:53 |
| 8. | "Is This Love" | Coverdale, John Sykes | 4:45 |
| 9. | "Cheap an' Nasty" | Coverdale, Vandenberg | 4:20 |
| 10. | "Crying in the Rain" (featuring Tommy Aldridge drum solo) | Coverdale | 13:27 |

Disc two
| No. | Title | Writer(s) | Length |
|---|---|---|---|
| 1. | "Fool for Your Loving" | Coverdale, Bernie Marsden, Moody | 6:01 |
| 2. | "For the Love of God" (from the Steve Vai album Passion and Warfare) | Steve Vai | 5:12 |
| 3. | "The Audience Is Listening" (from the Steve Vai album Passion and Warfare) | Vai | 3:01 |
| 4. | "Here I Go Again" | Coverdale, Marsden | 5:42 |
| 5. | "Bad Boys" | Coverdale, Sykes | 6:16 |
| 6. | "Ain't No Love in the Heart of the City" | Michael Price, Dan Walsh | 8:26 |
| 7. | "Still of the Night" | Coverdale, Sykes | 7:59 |

=== DVD ===
| No. | Title | Length |
|---|---|---|
| 1. | "Slip of the Tongue" |
| 2. | "Slide It In" |
| 3. | "Judgement Day" |
| 4. | "Slow an' Easy" |
| 5. | "Kittens Got Claws" |
| 6. | "Adagio for Strato" |
| 7. | "Flying Dutchman Boogie" |
| 8. | "Is This Love" |
| 9. | "Cheap an' Nasty" |
| 10. | "Crying in the Rain" (featuring Tommy Aldridge drum solo) |
| 11. | "Fool for Your Loving" |
| 12. | "For the Love of God" |
| 13. | "The Audience Is Listening" |
| 14. | "Here I Go Again" |
| 15. | "Bad Boys" |
| 16. | "Ain't No Love in the Heart of the City" |
| 17. | "Still of the Night" |
| 18. | "We Wish You Well" (Credits) |
| 19. | "The Making of Slip of the Tongue; Slide Show" (Bonus content) |

== Personnel ==
=== Whitesnake ===
- David Coverdale – lead vocals
- Steve Vai – guitars, backing vocals
- Adrian Vandenberg – guitars, backing vocals
- Rudy Sarzo – bass, backing vocals
- Tommy Aldridge – drums, percussion
- Rick Seratte – keyboards, backing vocals

== Charts ==
| Chart (2011) | Peak position |
|---|---|
| Belgian Albums (Ultratop Flanders) | 100 |
| German Albums (Offizielle Top 100) | 32 |
| Italian Albums (FIMI) | 85 |
ERROR in "Oricon": Invalid position: 221. Expected number 1–200 or dash (–).
| Japanese DVDs (Oricon) | 12 |
| UK Albums (Official Charts) | 81 |
| UK Rock & Metal Albums (Official Charts) | 5 |
