= Flesh & Blood (Whitesnake album) =

Studio album by Whitesnake
- Released: 10 May 2019
- Genre: Hard rock, glam metal
- Length: 59:22
- Label: Frontiers
- Producer: David Coverdale; Reb Beach; Joel Hoekstra; Michael McIntyre

Whitesnake chronology
The Purple Album (2015)	Flesh & Blood (2019)	The Rock Album (2020)

Singles from Flesh & Blood
- 1. "Shut Up & Kiss Me" Released: 14 February 2019; 2. "Trouble Is Your Middle Name" Released: 13 March 2019; 3. "Hey You (You Make Me Rock)" Released: 5 April 2019; 4. "Always & Forever" Released: 14 February 2020

Flesh & Blood is the thirteenth and final studio album by English rock band Whitesnake, released on 10 May 2019 through Frontiers Records. A music video was released for the lead single "Shut Up & Kiss Me". The album reached number 7 on the UK Albums Chart and topped the UK Rock & Metal Albums Chart, selling 4,894 copies on its first release.

== Background ==
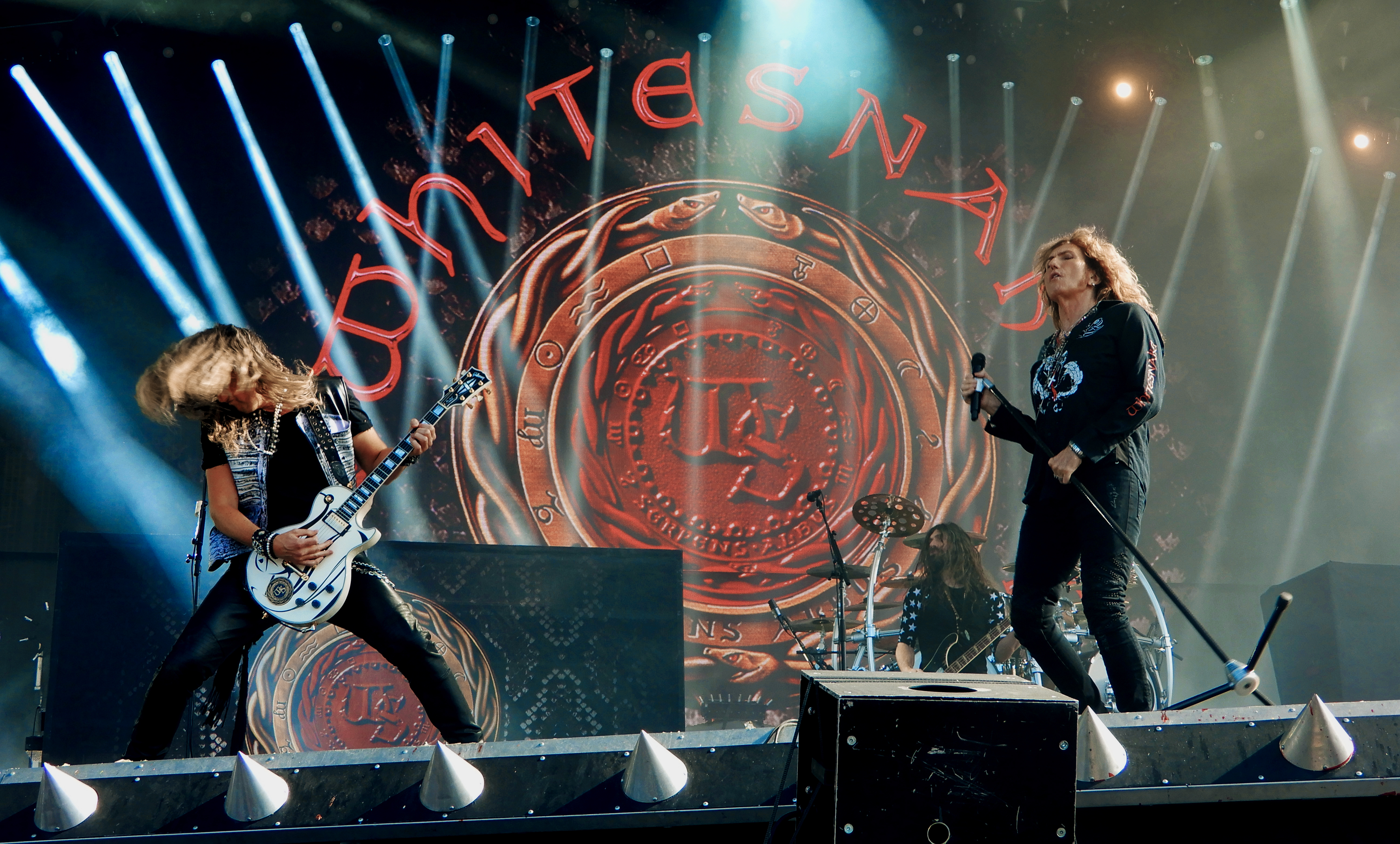
Whitesnake performing at Hellfest in Clisson, France, June 2019.

David Coverdale stated that the band "put everything we had and more into making this album". U.S. musician Joel Hoekstra, who joined Whitesnake in 2015, co-wrote six of the album's tracks with Coverdale. As well, U.S. musician Reb Beach co-wrote five of the tracks. The riff of the song "Gonna Be Alright" was one of Coverdale's unused ideas during the recording of Coverdale–Page (1993).

== Touring ==
The band embarked on a supporting tour in April with dates in North America, followed by a European tour over the summer. However, part of the world tour including Australia, New Zealand and Japan was delayed due to band members health issues and the COVID-19 pandemic.

== Critical reception ==
Professional ratings
Review scores
Source	Rating
Classic Rock	3.5/5 stars
Metal.de	6/10
Metal Hammer (Germany)	6/7
Rock Hard	8/10
The Rockpit	(favorable)

Philip Wilding of Classic Rock felt that listeners "hoping that the new Whitesnake album record will recall Coverdale's smoky, Lovehunter past should look away now", but for those that "want something to listen to while driving with the top down in some steamy Californian clime, then this Whitesnake is hard to beat". Thomas Kupfer for Rock Hard argued "although it doesn't belong in the ranks of the really great classics in the band's canon, it is a very good hard rock album that certainly knows how to set a tone". Mark Diggins of The Rockpit considered it is possibly the band's best album in decades.

Loudwire named it one of the 50 best rock albums of 2019.

== Track listing ==
No.	Title	Writer(s)	Length
1.	"Good to See You Again"	David Coverdale, Reb Beach, Joel Hoekstra	3:42
2.	"Gonna Be Alright"	Coverdale, Hoekstra	3:51
3.	"Shut Up & Kiss Me"	Coverdale, Beach	3:37
4.	"Hey You (You Make Me Rock)"	Coverdale, Beach, Hoekstra	5:29
5.	"Always & Forever"	Coverdale	3:53
6.	"When I Think of You (Color Me Blue)"	Coverdale	3:52
7.	"Trouble Is Your Middle Name"	Coverdale, Hoekstra	4:17
8.	"Flesh & Blood"	Coverdale	5:18
9.	"Well I Never"	Coverdale, Hoekstra	4:01
10.	"Heart of Stone"	Coverdale	6:42
11.	"Get Up"	Coverdale, Beach	4:45
12.	"After All"	Coverdale, Hoekstra	3:47
13.	"Sands of Time"	Coverdale, Beach	6:08
Total length:			59:22

Deluxe edition bonus tracks
No.	Title	Writer(s)	Length
14.	"Can't Do Right for Doing Wrong"	Coverdale, Beach	4:58
15.	"If I Can't Have You"	Coverdale, Hoekstra	4:23
16.	"Gonna Be Alright" (X-Tendo Mix)	Coverdale, Hoekstra	4:12
17.	"Sands of Time" (radio mix)	Coverdale, Beach	6:20
18.	"Shut Up & Kiss Me" (video mix)	Coverdale, Beach	3:43
Total length:			82:58

== Personnel ==
Credits are adapted from the album's liner notes.

Whitesnake

- David Coverdale – vocals
- Reb Beach – guitar
- Joel Hoekstra – guitar
- Michael Devin – bass guitar
- Tommy Aldridge – drums
- Michele Luppi – keyboards, backing vocals

Technical

- Michael McIntyre – engineering & recording
- Christopher 'Muffin Man' Collier – mixing & mastering
- Scott Hull – mastering (at Masterdisk, New York)

Design

- Hugh Gilmour – artwork & design

Management

- David Coverdale – executive producer
- Reb Beach, Joel Hoekstra, Michael McIntyre – producer
- Tom Gordon & Jeremiah Wynn – assisted producer

== Charts ==
The vinyl LP charted on the UK Official Vinyl Albums Chart at the 5th position.

Chart (2019)	Peak position
Australian Albums (ARIA)	86
Belgian Albums (Ultratop Flanders)	13
Belgian Albums (Ultratop Wallonia)	22
Czech Albums (ČNS IFPI)	26
Dutch Albums (Album Top 100)	51
Finnish Albums (Suomen virallinen lista)	4
French Albums (SNEP)	64
German Albums (Offizielle Top 100)	3
Hungarian Albums (MAHASZ)	12
Italian Albums (FIMI)	61
Japanese Albums (Oricon)	11
Japanese Hot Albums (Billboard Japan)	20
Norwegian Albums (VG-lista)	13
Polish Albums (ZPAV)	31
Scottish Albums (OCC)	2
Spanish Albums (Promusicae)	20
Swedish Albums (Sverigetopplistan)	9
Swiss Albums (Schweizer Hitparade)	2
UK Albums (OCC)	7
UK Rock & Metal Albums (OCC)	1
UK Independent Albums (OCC)	1
US Billboard 200	131
US Top Hard Rock Albums (Billboard)	6
US Independent Albums (Billboard)	5
US Top Rock Albums (Billboard)	22
US Indie Store Album Sales (Billboard)	5

== Release history ==
Release formats for Flesh & Blood
Region	Date	Label	Format	Edition	Ref.
Various	10 May 2019	Frontiers	CD; DVD; LP; coloured LP	Standard	
Various	10 May 2019	Frontiers; The Orchard/Sony	Digital download; streaming	Standard	
Japan	10 May 2019	Frontiers; Ward	LP; CD; DVD	Standard	
Various	10 May 2019	Frontiers	Box set; LP; CD; DVD	Deluxe Collector's Edition	
Various	11-12 November 2024	Craft Recordings; Concord; Universal	Digital download; streaming	Standard	
