= Restless Heart (Whitesnake album) =

Studio album by David Coverdale & Whitesnake
- Released: 26 March 1997
- Studios: Sierra Sonic, Reno, Nevada
- Genres: Hard rock, blues rock, glam metal, pop rock
- Length: 55:51
- Label: EMI
- Producer: David Coverdale

David Coverdale chronology
Coverdale–Page (1993)	Restless Heart (1997)	Into the Light (2000)

Whitesnake chronology
Whitesnake's Greatest Hits (1994)	Restless Heart (1997)	Starkers in Tokyo (1998)

Alternative cover
- Japanese cover art

Alternative cover
- Reissued cover art

Singles from Restless Heart
- 1. "Too Many Tears" Released: 12 May 1997; 2. "Don't Fade Away" Released: 13 October 1997

Restless Heart is the ninth studio album by British-American rock band Whitesnake, released by EMI on 26 March 1997 in Japan and 26 May in Europe. It was produced by the band's vocalist David Coverdale and originally conceived as a solo album. However, EMI pressured him into releasing the record under the moniker "David Coverdale & Whitesnake". Musically Restless Heart features a more subdued sound compared to Whitesnake's previous two albums. It is also the only full-length Whitesnake studio album to feature guitarist Adrian Vandenberg throughout, despite having been a member of the group since 1987.

The album received a mixed response from music critics, and only reached number 34 in the group's native UK. In total, Restless Heart charted in ten countries. With Whitesnake having been dropped by Geffen Records in 1994, Restless Heart did not receive a North American release, being available only as an import. The album's supporting tour was billed as Whitesnake's farewell tour, although the band would later reform in 2003. Restless Heart was reissued by Rhino Entertainment in 2021, featuring remastered and remixed versions of the album, among other previously unreleased material.

== Background ==
After completing the Liquor & Poker World Tour in September 1990, vocalist David Coverdale elected to put Whitesnake on hold, wanting to take a break from the music industry. In 1993, he released an album with Led Zeppelin guitarist Jimmy Page. However, the collaboration came to an abrupt end in December 1993 after only a few live shows. Coverdale then contacted Whitesnake guitarist Adrian Vandenberg about resuming their musical partnership. Their previous writing sessions prior to Coverdale's collaboration with Page had broken down after Vandenberg presented songs "more suited to Chicago or Poison".

In early 1994, Coverdale was approached with the opportunity of performing in Saint Petersburg. He accepted and soon began planning a full European tour with a session band backing him. However, EMI and Geffen Records released Whitesnake's Greatest Hits in July 1994. Thus, Coverdale was asked by EMI to tour as Whitesnake instead. Though initially reluctant, he eventually agreed with Vandenberg in tow. After the tour ended later that year, Whitesnake were dropped by Geffen Records, leaving the band without a North American record deal. Sony Japan had also dropped the group, but Coverdale signed to a Toshiba EMI label (EMI's subdivisionary unit in Japan) thereafter. Keen on establishing himself as a solo artist outside of Whitesnake, Coverdale resumed his writing sessions with Vandenberg on what was to be a solo album.

== Production and composition ==
Recording sessions for the album began in 1995 in Reno, Nevada, where Coverdale was living at the time. He produced the album himself, with Bjorn Thorsrud acting as engineer. The album was then mixed by Mike Shipley, and mastered by Eddie Schreyer. In the studio, Coverdale and Vandenberg were joined by bassist Guy Pratt, keyboardist Brett Tuggle and drummer Denny Carmassi, all of whom had performed on the Coverdale–Page tour. Carmassi had also been a member of Whitesnake on the Greatest Hits tour.

Restless Heart marked the first time Adrian Vandenberg played on a full-length Whitesnake album throughout, despite having been a member of the group since 1987. While he is minimally featured on 1989's Slip of the Tongue, the majority of the guitar parts were recorded by Steve Vai.

=== Music and lyrics ===
The sound of Restless Heart has been characterised by music critics as mellower and more blues-influenced than Whitesnake's previous two studio albums. Music journalist and author Martin Popoff characterised the record as "variously poppy, bluesy, rootsy, but still often heavy rockin’". Metal Hammer's Andreas Schöwe also noted an influence of soul on some of the tracks.

A number of Coverdale's unused ideas for a second Coverdale–Page album were reappropriated for Restless Heart, namely on the songs "Woman Trouble Blues" and "Take Me Back Again". "Too Many Tears" was originally conceived in the early 1990s during Coverdale and Vandenberg's initial writing sessions. The original version was described by Coverdale as an "old Stax soul tune", but the song was later reworked into a blues number. Lyrically, the album's title-track explores Coverdale's mindset during Slip of the Tongue and its accompanying tour, when he became worn out "trying to fulfil everybody else's expectations". "Crying" has drawn comparisons to Led Zeppelin from several music critics.

== Release and promotion ==
As the record was being finished, new higher-ups at EMI flew to Reno for a listening session. Afterwards they informed Coverdale that they wanted the album to be released under the Whitesnake moniker. He objected, feeling that the record was stylistically too different from the band. However, Coverdale's contract with EMI referred to him as "David Coverdale, known as the artist Whitesnake", thus he was contractually obligated to comply. It was at Denny Carmassi's suggestion that he decided to compromise and agreed to release the album under the moniker "David Coverdale & Whitesnake". As a result, the guitars and drums on the album were brought up in the mix in order to bring the album closer to Whitesnake's sound. Coverdale later expressed disappointment over this decision.

Restless Heart was released on 26 March 1997 in Japan, and 26 May in Europe. Two promo albums containing tracks from Restless Heart were released, under the names Precious Secrets and No Shadows On The Wall. It peaked at number 34 on the UK Albums Chart and spent a total of three weeks on the chart. This ended the group's top ten consecutive streak in the UK after a string of 6 studio albums. It found better success on the Rock & Metal Albums Chart, where it spent 17 weeks, peaking at number three. Overall, the album charted in ten countries, cracking the top ten in Sweden, Finland and Japan. As Whitesnake had been dropped by Geffen Records in 1994, Restless Heart did not receive a North American release, being available only as an import. By the end of 1997, it has sold 103,340 copies in Japan.

"Too Many Tears" and "Don't Fade Away" were released as singles from the album, with the former peaking at number 46 on the UK Singles Chart. On the Rock & Metal Singles Chart it reached number five and charted for 34 weeks. Music videos were produced for both tracks, directed by Russell Young. The video for "Too Many Tears" also featured future Whitesnake member Marco Mendoza on bass.

=== Reissue ===
Restless Heart was reissued by Rhino Entertainment via Whitesnake's production label, Saltburn, LLC., on 29 October 2021 as a multi-disc box set, featuring remastered and remixed versions of the album, as well as previously unreleased demos and outtakes. The collection also included music videos and interviews about the making of the album. Current Whitesnake guitarist Joel Hoekstra and former Dream Theater keyboardist Derek Sherinian recorded additional parts for the remixed version of the record. Additional percussion and backing vocals were provided by Christopher Collier, who remixed the album. Some of the remixed songs had previously been included on a series of compilation albums, collectively titled the "Red, White and Blues" trilogy, which were released between 2020 and 2021.

The reissue charted in seven countries, peaking at number five on the UK Rock & Metal Albums Chart.

== Touring ==
The supporting tour for Restless Heart was billed as Whitesnake's farewell tour as Coverdale wanted to explore other forms of music outside of hard rock (he would go on to release the solo album Into the Light in 2000). For the tour, Pratt and Tuggle were replaced by Tony Franklin and Derek Hilland, respectively, while Steve Farris was recruited as a second guitarist. During a promotional trip to Japan in July 1997, Coverdale and Vandenberg were asked by Toshiba EMI to perform an acoustic set of songs. This performance was later released as Starkers in Tokyo. The Last Hurrah tour began in September 1997, and ended that December in South America.

== Critical reception ==
Professional ratings
Review scores
Source	Rating
AllMusic	3/5 stars
Classic Rock	3.5/5 stars
Metal Hammer	5/7
Q	2/5 stars
Rock Hard	8/10
Rock Hard	6/10

Contemporary review for Restless Heart were mixed. Rock Hard in one of its two reviews described the album as "nice but harmless", and "a tired exit" as potentially the last Whitesnake album. Metal Hammer's Andreas Schöwe commented positively on the record's more "finely nuanced vocal parts", though he stated that some listeners may be weary of the album's softer sound compared to Whitesnake's previous releases. Nonetheless, he gave the album a score of five out of seven. Paul Elliott of Q magazine was lukewarm on the record, and gave it two stars out of five.

Retrospective reviews for the album have remained mixed. AllMusic's Greg Prato commended Coverdale for not trying to change Whitesnake's sound to fit then-current trends. He concluded his review by stating that "longtime Whitesnake fans will be pleased" with the record, awarding three stars out of five. Jerry Ewing, writing for Classic Rock, described Restless Heart as a "curio" in the band's discography, falling somewhere between a Whitesnake album and a David Coverdale solo record. He ultimately deemed this the album's greatest weakness, not being one thing nor the other. Nevertheless, he still commented positively on many of the songs. In a separate piece, Classic Rock's Neil Jeffries ranked Restless Heart second-to-last in David Coverdale's overall studio discography, describing the songs as either "limp ballads" or "derivative rockers". Reviewing the 2021 remix, Malcolm Dome, also for Classic Rock, stated that Restless Heart is "better than history has painted it". He also noted how the remix improved many of the songs.

== Track listing ==
All tracks are written by David Coverdale and Adrian Vandenberg, except where noted.

No.	Title	Writer(s)	Length
1.	"Don't Fade Away"		5:02
2.	"All in the Name of Love"		4:42
3.	"Restless Heart"		4:50
4.	"Too Many Tears"		5:44
5.	"Crying"		5:34
6.	"Stay with Me" (Lorraine Ellison cover)	Jerry Ragovoy, George David Weiss	4:09
7.	"Can't Go On"		4:27
8.	"You're So Fine"		4:34
9.	"Your Precious Love"		4:48
10.	"Take Me Back Again"		6:02
11.	"Woman Trouble Blues"		5:35
Total length:			55:51

Japanese bonus tracks
No.	Title	Writer(s)	Length
12.	"Anything You Want"		4:11
13.	"Can't Stop Now"		3:27
14.	"Oi" (instrumental)	Denny Carmassi, Coverdale, Vandenberg	3:47
Total length:			67:16

25th Anniversary Edition

Disc one: 2021 Remix
No.	Title	Writer(s)	Length
1.	"Restless Heart"		4:53
2.	"You're So Fine"		5:11
3.	"Can't Go On"		4:28
4.	"Crying"		5:38
5.	"Take Me Back Again"		6:24
6.	"Anything You Want"		4:12
7.	"Too Many Tears"		5:44
8.	"All in the Name of Love"		5:14
9.	"Your Precious Love"		4:32
10.	"Can't Stop Now"		3:26
11.	"Woman Trouble Blues"		5:42
12.	"Stay with Me" (Lorraine Ellison cover)	Ragovoy, Weiss	4:07
13.	"Oi (Theme for an Imaginary Drum Solo)" (instrumental)	Carmassi, Coverdale, Vandenberg	3:44
14.	"Don't Fade Away"		4:58
15.	"Can't Go On" (Unzipped)		3:47
Total length:			72:00

Disc two: 2021 Remaster
No.	Title	Writer(s)	Length
1.	"Don't Fade Away"		5:02
2.	"All in the Name of Love"		4:42
3.	"Restless Heart"		4:50
4.	"Too Many Tears"		5:44
5.	"Crying"		5:34
6.	"Stay with Me" (Lorraine Ellison cover)	Ragovoy, Weiss	4:09
7.	"Can't Go On"		4:27
8.	"You're So Fine"		4:34
9.	"Your Precious Love"		4:48
10.	"Take Me Back Again"		6:02
11.	"Woman Trouble Blues"		5:35
12.	"Anything You Want"		4:11
13.	"Can't Stop Now"		3:27
14.	"Too Many Tears '95 (Live & Drunk in the Studio featuring the Horny B'stards)"		4:56
Total length:			68:25

Disc three: Dancing on the Titanic (Early Arrangements and Getting Drum Tracks in the Studio)
No.	Title	Writer(s)	Length
1.	"Restless Heart"		5:19
2.	"You're So Fine"		4:20
3.	"Can't Go On"		4:28
4.	"Crying"		6:30
5.	"Take Me Back Again"		6:38
6.	"Anything You Want"		4:15
7.	"Too Many Tears"		4:51
8.	"All in the Name of Love"		5:48
9.	"Your Precious Love (Soul Version)"		1:01
10.	"Your Precious Love"		4:36
11.	"Can't Stop Now" (instrumental)		3:32
12.	"Woman Trouble Blues"		5:31
13.	"Stay with Me" (Lorraine Ellison cover)	Ragovoy, Weiss	4:08
14.	"Oi" (instrumental)	Carmassi, Coverdale, Vandenberg	3:51
15.	"Don't Fade Away"		4:37
16.	"Snakes Down South" (unreleased demo)		3:14
Total length:			70:39

Disc four: Restless Heart – Evolutions
No.	Title	Writer(s)	Length
1.	"Restless Heart"		5:46
2.	"You're So Fine"		4:20
3.	"Can't Go On"		5:04
4.	"Crying"		8:08
5.	"Take Me Back Again"		6:35
6.	"Anything You Want (Red Light Green Light)"		6:22
7.	"Too Many Tears"		6:07
8.	"All in the Name of Love"		5:35
9.	"Your Precious Love"		5:12
10.	"Can't Stop Now"		4:56
11.	"Woman Trouble Blues"		6:32
12.	"Stay with Me" (Lorraine Ellison cover)	Ragovoy, Weiss	4:04
13.	"Oi" (instrumental)	Carmassi, Coverdale, Vandenberg	3:55
14.	"Don't Fade Away"		5:44
Total length:			78:20

Disc five: Restless Heart (DVD)
No.	Title	Length
1.	"All in the Name of Love" (fan video)
2.	"Anything You Want" (fan video)
3.	"You're So Fine" (music video)
4.	"Restless Heart" (music video)
5.	"Too Many Tears" (music video)
6.	"Don't Fade Away" (music video)
7.	"Can't Go On" (acoustic slideshow)
8.	"Restless Heart" (lyric video)
9.	"Too Many Tears" (Starkers in Tokyo)
10.	"Can't Go On" (Starkers in Tokyo)
11.	"Don't Fade Away" (Starkers in Tokyo)
12.	"The Making of Restless Heart"

== Personnel ==
Credits are adapted from the album's liner notes.

Whitesnake

- David Coverdale – vocals
- Adrian Vandenberg – guitar
- Guy Pratt – bass
- Denny Carmassi – drums, percussion
- Brett Tuggle – keyboards, backing vocals

Additional musicians

- Tommy Funderburk – backing vocals
- Beth Anderson – backing vocals
- Maxine Waters – backing vocals
- Elk Thunder – harmonica
- Chris Whitemyer – percussion

Technical

- David Coverdale – production
- Bjorn Thorsrud – engineering
- Mike Shipley – mixing
- Eddie Schreyer – mastering
- Chris Whitemyer – guitar technician
- Gary Clark – drum technician
- Michael Bernard – keyboard technician

Management

- Howard Kaufman – management
- Clive Black – A&R coordination
- Nina Avramides – album production coordination
- Michael McIntyre – album production coordination

Design

- Hugh Syme – art direction, emblem design, cover concept development
- David Coverdale – cover concept development
- Dimo Safari – cover concept development
- Mick McGinty – illustration
- Peacock – UK artwork
- Russell Young – front cover photography
- Masa Ito – liner notes (Japanese release only)
- Koh Sakai – liner notes (Japanese release only)
- Ginger Kunita – liner notes (Japanese release only)

Reissue

- David Coverdale – executive producer
- Michael McIntyre – producer
- Tom Gordon – producer, project coordination, audio restoration
- Joel Hoekstra – guitar
- Derek Sherinian – keyboards
- Christopher Collier – percussion, backing vocals
- Hugh Gilmour – A&R, design, liner notes
- Jeremiah Luke Wynn – engineer
- Josh Bernhard – engineer
- Christopher Collier – remixing
- Scott Hull – remastering
- Tyler Bourns – DVD authoring; director ("The Making of Restless Heart")
- Ray Shulman – DVD authoring
- Liuba Shapiro Ruiz – product manager
- Jörg Planer – additional memorabilia

== Charts ==
1997 weekly chart performance for Restless Heart
Chart (1997)	Peak position
Austrian Albums (Ö3 Austria)	45
Dutch Albums (Album Top 100)	65
Finnish Albums (Suomen virallinen lista)	7
German Albums (Offizielle Top 100)	26
Japanese Albums (Oricon)	10
Norwegian Albums (VG-lista)	35
Scottish Albums (Official Charts)	30
Swedish Albums (Sverigetopplistan)	5
Swiss Albums (Schweizer Hitparade)	23
UK Albums (Official Charts)	34
UK Rock & Metal Albums (Official Charts)	3

2021 weekly chart performance for Restless Heart (25th Anniversary Edition)
Chart (2021)	Peak position
Belgian Albums (Ultratop Flanders)	141
Belgian Albums (Ultratop Wallonia)	55
German Albums (Offizielle Top 100)	47
Hungarian Albums (MAHASZ)	22
Spanish Albums (Promusicae)	83
Swiss Albums (Schweizer Hitparade)	30
UK Rock & Metal Albums (OCC)	5

2022 weekly chart performance for Restless Heart (25th Anniversary Edition)
Chart (2022)	Peak position
Japanese Hot Albums (Billboard Japan)	87

=== Singles ===
Year	Single	Chart	Position
1997	"Too Many Tears"		
1997	"Too Many Tears"	UK Singles Chart	46
1997	"Too Many Tears"	UK Rock & Metal Singles Chart	5

== Release history ==
Release formats for Restless Heart
Region	Date	Label	Format	Ref.
Japan	26 March 1997	EMI	CD; cassette	
Europe	26 May 1997	EMI	CD; cassette	
Various	29 October 2021	Rhino	CD; LP; BD; Streaming; Digital download	
Japan	29 December 2021	Rhino	SHM-CD; LP; BD	
Various	6 January 2026	Craft Recordings; Concord; UMG	Streaming; Digital download	
