= Forevermore (Whitesnake album) =

Studio album by Whitesnake
- Released: 9 March 2011
- Recorded: 2010
- Studios: Snakebyte Studios and Grumblenott Studios & Villas, Lake Tahoe, Nevada, Casa Dala, Sherman Oaks, Entourage Studios, North Hollywood, California
- Genre: Hard rock
- Length: 63:31
- Labels: Frontiers; WEA (Japan)
- Producers: Los Bros Brutalos (David Coverdale, Doug Aldrich, Michael McIntyre)

Whitesnake chronology
30th Anniversary Collection (2008)	Forevermore (2011)	Live at Donington 1990 (2011)

Singles from Forevermore
- 1. "Love Will Set You Free" Released: 2011; 2. "One of These Days" Released: 2011; 3. "Easier Said Than Done" Released: 1 October 2020

Alternate Cover
- 2025 Reissue

Forevermore is the eleventh studio album by English rock band Whitesnake. It was first released on 9 March 2011 in Japan through Warner Music Japan, following a European release on 25 March and 29 March in North America through Frontiers Records. This album features Doug Aldrich's second and final studio album appearance in guitar since joining the group in 2003. Forevermore showcases a blend of hard rock, blues, soul, and ballads that was more prevalent in the present-day Whitesnake lineup. After a moderately successful comeback album, Good to Be Bad (2008), Coverdale originally proposed to create a concept album that is more acoustic; however over time, the project was edged up to a heavier sound.

Commercially, Forevermore was successful in a handful of countries, but however was a commercial disappointment in their native UK, where it charted for one week at a spot at number 33. It peaked at number 49 on the Billboard 200 albums chart in the United States, an improvement than their previous release, opening at over 12,000 copies. Its lead promo single, "Love Will Set You Free" premiered as a video on Whitesnake's social media accounts following its digital release. The song reached number 26 on Billboard Heritage Rock. Other singles, "Steal Your Heart Away" and "One of These Days" were released as promos, but neither of them charted in any airplay or mainstream charts. The album received a reissue in 2025 through Rhino Entertainment, which is considered their last set of box set reissue series from the Whitesnake catalogue, which was simultaneously proceeded by Coverdale's retirement in November 2025.

== Background ==
In 2008, Whitesnake released their first studio album in more than a decade, Good to Be Bad. The album was well-received, and charted in several countries. Whitesnake guitarist Doug Aldrich revealed that he had started coming up with song ideas for a followup in 2009, a year after Good to be Bad was released. Aldrich also noted that "David [Coverdale, Whitesnake frontman] had said that he might wanted ^{[sic]} to make a record and maybe it could be more acoustic-based."

David Coverdale has stated that he believes Forevermore is "still embracing all those elements that drew [the band's fans] to Whitesnake in the first place."

== Release and promotion ==
A special edition of the album, called 'Snake Pack' was released in the UK only, and contains two bonus live tracks, a 132-page magazine, a pin, as well as special artwork. The two live bonus tracks are a teaser for the upcoming live album, recorded in 1990 at Donington Park (Live at Donington 1990) and released in the summer of 2011. On iTunes, the album also contains two different bonus tracks, an alternative mix of "Love Will Set You Free" and an acoustic version of "Forevermore". In addition, Amazon offered the album with the bonus track "My Evil Ways" on its digital store.

A digital single for the song "Love Will Set You Free" was released on 21 February 2011, while the video was released on 14 February. A free download of the song was made available on Whitesnake's Facebook page on 15 February. The single charted on the Billboard Heritage Rock charts at number 26.

Forevermore was reissued through Rhino Entertainment in a box set and a standalone vinyl set on 26 September. A video of the song, "Easier Said Than Done" featuring Hook City Strings premiered on the group's YouTube page on 14 August. In late-January, the reissue was removed from every streaming platforms to reflect a change as the majority of the Whitesnake's catalogue have been transferred to Craft Recordings.

== Tour ==
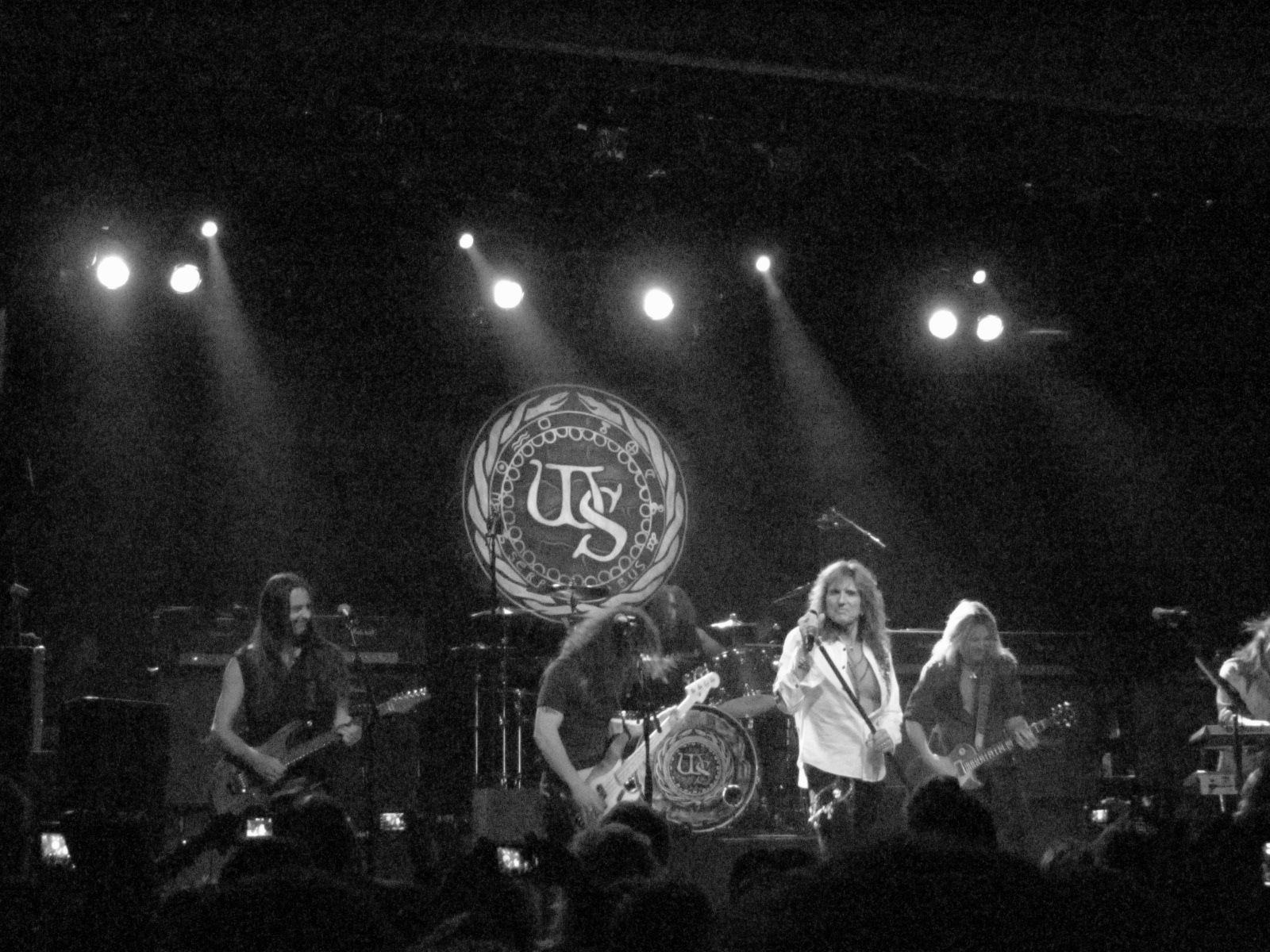
Whitesnake performing at Irving Plaza, New York City, May 2011.

A world tour to promote the album was announced, and American dates listed for May and August 2011, and European dates are listed for June and July 2011. Following the release of the album, a worldwide tour began on 11 May 2011 in Westbury, New York. The North American concerts were followed by concerts in Europe, South America and Asia. The tour went to thirty-five countries. It ended on 8 December 2011 in Wolverhampton, England.

Six songs from the album were performed live, namely "Steal Your Heart Away", "Love Will Set You Free", "One of These Days", "Fare Thee Well", "My Evil Ways" and "Forevermore". Two former Whitesnake band members, Adrian Vandenberg and Bernie Marsden, played as guests on four concerts.

== Reception ==
Professional ratings
Review scores
Source	Rating
AllMusic	3.5/5 stars
Blabbermouth.net	8.5/10 stars
Classic Rock	4/5 stars
The Guardian	2/5 stars
Metal.de	7/10
Metal Hammer (Germany)	5/7
Rock Hard	5.5/10

Forevermore was met with generally positive reviews upon release. Thom Jurek of AllMusic rated the album 3.5/5 and stated that "the album's first single, Love Will Set You Free, is top-notch Whitesnake that nods back to the early years while grounding itself in the present." He also stated that the tracks "All Out of Luck" and "Tell Me How" "measure up in the same way".

== Commercial performance ==
Forevermore peaked at number 33 on the UK Albums Chart, spending only one week there. This was their second lowest position since Ready an' Willing (1980). Despite modest sales, it fared better at the Rock & Metal Albums chart, peaking at number two behind Foo Fighters' Wasting Light and spent ten weeks on that chart.

In the United States, the album debuted at number 49 on the Billboard 200, with 12,000 copies sold at its first week. This was an improvement since their previous release Good to Be Bad (2008) opened at number 70, selling only 8,000 copies, eventually peaking at number 62. In its second week, the album fell to number 127, selling 4,380, then 2,760 in its third week. In a three-week time period, the album has sold more than 19,100 units in the US. It additionally reached number three and five on Top Tastemaker Albums and Top Hard Rock Albums, respectively. It also reached number 13 on Top Rock Albums and number ten on Independent Albums. As of May 2015, Forevermore has sold 44,000 copies since its release.

In Japan, the album debuted at number 18, spending 11 weeks on that chart. Forevermore had similar successes across European markets. In Scandinavia, it performed better there, peaking at number six in Sweden, 11 in Finland and 16 in Norway. Overall, the album charted in 15 countries.

== Track listing ==
All tracks are written by David Coverdale and Doug Aldrich, except where noted.

No.	Title	Length
1.	"Steal Your Heart Away"	5:18
2.	"All Out of Luck"	5:28
3.	"Love Will Set You Free"	3:52
4.	"Easier Said Than Done"	5:13
5.	"Tell Me How"	4:41
6.	"I Need You (Shine a Light)"	3:49
7.	"One of These Days"	4:53
8.	"Love and Treat Me Right"	4:14
9.	"Dogs in the Street"	3:48
10.	"Fare Thee Well"	5:18
11.	"Whipping Boy Blues"	5:02
12.	"My Evil Ways"	4:33
13.	"Forevermore"	7:22
Total length:		63:31

Japanese bonus track
No.	Title	Length
14.	"Whipping Boy Blues" (Swamp Mix)	6:06

Deluxe edition bonus tracks
No.	Title	Length
14.	"Love Will Set You Free" (Alternative Mix)	4:09
15.	"Forevermore" (Acoustic Version)	4:42
16.	"My Evil Ways" (My Evil Drums Mix)	4:50

'Snake Pack' bonus tracks
No.	Title	Writer(s)	Length
14.	"Slide It In" (Live at Donington 1990)	Coverdale	5:05
15.	"Cheap an' Nasty" (Live at Donington 1990)	Coverdale, Adrian Vandenberg	4:33

iTunes LP edition bonus tracks
No.	Title	Length
14.	"Love Will Set You Free" (Alternative Mix)	4:09
15.	"Forevermore" (Acoustic Version)	4:42
16.	"Love Will Set You Free" (Music video)	3:51

Amazon.com digital store bonus track
No.	Title	Length
14.	"My Evil Ways" (My Evil Drums Mix)	4:50

== Personnel ==
Whitesnake

- David Coverdale – vocals
- Doug Aldrich – guitars
- Reb Beach – guitars
- Michael Devin – bass
- Brian Tichy – drums

Additional personnel

- Timothy Drury – keyboards
- Jasper Coverdale – backing vocals

Production

- Produced, engineered and mixed by Los Bros Brutalos (David Coverdale, Doug Aldrich, Michael McIntyre)
- Mike Tacci – drums recording engineer
- Eric Astor – assistant engineer
- Dave Donnelly – mastering

== Charts ==
Chart (2011)	Peak position
Austrian Albums (Ö3 Austria)	27
Belgian Albums (Ultratop Flanders)	63
Belgian Albums (Ultratop Wallonia)	37
Czech Charts	15
Dutch Albums (Album Top 100)	42
Finnish Albums (Suomen virallinen lista)	11
French Albums (SNEP)	124
German Albums (Offizielle Top 100)	16
Hungarian Albums (MAHASZ)	23
Italian Albums (FIMI)	41
Japanese Albums (Oricon)	18
Norwegian Albums (VG-lista)	16
Polish Charts	49
Scottish Albums (Official Charts)	34
Swedish Albums (Sverigetopplistan)	6
Swiss Albums (Schweizer Hitparade)	17
UK Albums (Official Charts)	33
UK Rock & Metal Albums (Official Charts)	2
UK Independent Albums (Official Charts)	5
US Billboard 200	49
US Independent Albums (Billboard)	10
US Top Hard Rock Albums (Billboard)	5
US Top Rock Albums (Billboard)	13
US Indie Store Album Sales (Billboard)	3

Chart (2025)	Peak position
UK Rock & Metal Albums (Official Charts)	18

== Release history ==
Region	Date	Edition(s)	Format(s)	Label(s)	Ref.
Japan	9 March 2011	Standard	CD; CD+DVD	WEA	
United Kingdom	23 March 2011	Limited	CD	Classic Rock; Frontiers	
Europe	25 March 2011	Standard; deluxe	CD; digital download; CD+DVD; LP	Frontiers	
North America	29 March 2011	Standard; deluxe	CD; digital download; CD+DVD; LP	Frontiers	
Various	26 September 2025	Revisited, Remixed, Remastered	Box set; CD+DVD; Blu-ray; LP; digital download; streaming	Rhino; Saltburn	
Japan	8 October 2025	Revisited, Remixed, Remastered	Box set; CD+DVD; SHM-CD; Blu-ray; LP; digital download; streaming	Rhino; Saltburn	
