= Give Me More Time =

Single by Whitesnake

from the album Slide It In
- Released: 3 January 1984
- Recorded: 1983
- Genre: Hard rock
- Length: 3:41
- Label: Liberty/EMI
- Songwriter: David Coverdale
- Producer: Martin Birch

Whitesnake singles chronology
"Guilty of Love" (1983)	"Give Me More Time" (1984)	"Standing in the Shadow" (1984)

Alternative cover
- Japanese Cover

"Give Me More Time" is a song by the British rock band Whitesnake from their 1984 album Slide It In. The single was released on 3 January 1984 in Europe and 9 January in Germany. The song was written by David Coverdale and Mel Galley. It was also the only single to be released in Japan through CBS/Sony. The song reached number 29 in the UK and number 27 in Ireland.

== Background ==
A music video was also shot for the single from BBC's TV's Top of the Pops, which was then premiered on 19 January 1984.

== Track listings ==
UK 7" Single

1. "Give Me More Time" – 3:41 (Coverdale/Mel Galley)
2. "Need Your Love So Bad" – 3:14 (Little Willie John, Mertis John Jr.)

Japanese 7" Single

1. "Give Me More Time" – 3:41 (Coverdale/Mel Galley)
2. "Guilty of Love" – 3:18 (Coverdale)

== Personnel ==
- David Coverdale – lead vocals, percussion
- Micky Moody – guitars
- Mel Galley – guitars, backing vocals
- Colin Hodgkinson – bass
- Cozy Powell – drums
- Jon Lord – keyboards

== Weekly charts ==
Weekly chart performance for "Give Me More Time"
Chart (1984)	Peak position
UK Singles (Official Charts)	29
Ireland (IRMA)	27

== Release history ==
Region	Date	Format(s)	Label(s)	Ref.
Europe	3 January 1984	7-inch vinyl	Liberty	
United Kingdom	6 January 1984	7-inch vinyl; 12-inch vinyl	Liberty	
Germany	9 January 1984	7-inch vinyl	EMI Electrola	
Japan	1984	7-inch vinyl	Geffen; CBS/Sony	
