= Love Ain't No Stranger =

Single by Whitesnake

from the album Slide It In
- B-side: "Guilty of Love" (US) "Slow an' Easy" (UK)
- Released: August 1984 (US); 28 January 1985 (UK)
- Recorded: 1983
- Genre: Glam metal
- Length: 4:14
- Label: Liberty (Europe); Geffen (North America)
- Songwriters: David Coverdale, Mel Galley

Whitesnake singles chronology
"Standing in the Shadow" (1984)	"Love Ain't No Stranger" (1984)	"Slow an' Easy" (1984)

Music video
- "Love Ain't No Stranger" on YouTube

"Love Ain't No Stranger" is a power ballad by the British rock group Whitesnake, and it is taken from the band's U.S.-breakthrough album Slide It In. One of the group's best known songs, it's been included in multiple multi-artist compilation albums as well as in various media from Whitesnake's own labels. Particularly well-received in the context of the 1980s heavy music boom in the Anglosphere, various music critics have praised its composition.

"Love Ain't No Stranger" is a staple of the band's live performances. Due to its popularity among fans, Whitesnake has performed the song over eight hundred times as of December 2022, making it one of the group's top five most played pieces.

The song charted at number 44 on the UK Singles Chart and 34 on the U.S. Mainstream rock charts. Eduardo Rivadavia of AllMusic described the song as "one of the decade's greatest power ballads, bar none."

== Recording ==
The song starts with keyboardist Jon Lord's keyboards with emotional vocal delivery from singer David Coverdale. The song keeps a slow tempo until the guitars and drums kick in when the song tempo drastically changes and becomes a hard driving rock song. The slow tempo "ballady" section doesn't emerge again until the very middle and very end of the song. According to the 25th Anniversary Edition booklet of Slide It In, the keyboard intro was originally written for guitars, but was eventually switched to keyboards. Also, Coverdale told in the edition's booklet that drummer Cozy Powell once told the singer that "Love Ain't No Stranger" was the best track he'd ever played drums on.

== Music video ==
The music video was filmed in Hollywood, which Geffen had arranged after the success of Whitesnake's song "Slow an' Easy" and was directed by directed by Mark Rezyka. During the filming, it contained 22 takes of the band performing on stage, which it was then made out of sync.

The video begins with Coverdale walking alone in a misty night scene at a city. The scene cuts to a shot of Coverdale looking up at a woman in a building. Snake lines were tattooed on the woman's chest that are nearly identical to the group's Slide It In cover. The scene then cuts to a group of people having a night-out on the corridors, with Sykes and Murray in the group. Another woman stands out from the group, depicted as an outcast. She looks at Coverdale as the scene continues on the band performs the song at a mock concert. During Sykes' guitar solo, the scene cuts to Sykes grabbing the woman and seemingly inviting her to ride with others in a truck. At the end of the video, Coverdale climbs on to a truck and hugs the woman, but as he turns around he sees that the woman has changed and that the woman he was after is standing on the ground. As the truck drives away, Coverdale stares back at the woman as she disappears into the mist. The woman was revealed to be the girlfriend of Quiet Riot and Ozzy Osbourne's bassist, Rudy Sarzo. He would eventually join Whitesnake in the end of 1986 to tour with the group for the group's 1987 album.

== Track listing ==
No.	Title	Writer(s)	Length
1.	"Love Ain't No Stranger"	David Coverdale, Mel Galley	4:14

Liberty Records-version
No.	Title	Writer(s)	Length
2.	"Slow An' Easy"	Coverdale, Micky Moody	6:09
3.	"Slide It In"	Coverdale	3:20

Geffen Records-version
No.	Title	Writer(s)	Length
2.	"Guilty of Love"	Coverdale	3:18

== Personnel ==
- David Coverdale – lead vocals, percussion
- Micky Moody – guitars (UK version)
- John Sykes – guitars (US version)
- Mel Galley – guitars, backing vocals
- Colin Hodgkinson – bass (UK version)
- Neil Murray – bass (US version)
- Cozy Powell – drums
- Jon Lord – keyboards

== Charts ==
Chart (1985)	Peak position
UK Singles (The Official Charts Company)	44
US Billboard Mainstream Rock	33

== See also ==
- 1984 in music
- Whitesnake discography
