= Standing in the Shadow =

Single by Whitesnake

from the album Slide It In
- Released: 16 April 1984
- Genre: Hard rock; Glam metal (1987 version)
- Length: 3:34; 3:53 (1987 version)
- Label: Liberty
- Songwriter: David Coverdale
- Producer: Martin Birch

Whitesnake singles chronology
| "Give Me More Time" (1984) | "Standing in the Shadow" (1984) | "Love Ain't No Stranger" (1984) |

"Standing in the Shadow" is a song by the British rock band Whitesnake from their 1984 album Slide It In. It was written by singer David Coverdale.

While it does not have a music video, it was released as a single by Liberty Records with the B-Side American version of "All or Nothing." The single only charted No. 62 in the UK Singles chart and stayed for three weeks.

== 1987 re-recording ==
The song was re-recorded and remixed by Keith Olsen, who happened to remixed the American version of "Slide It In" and later the band's 1987 self-titled album.

The song, known as "Standing in the Shadows" appeared on the second track of the 1987 single, "Is This Love" in the EMI single version. It was also included in the EP demo version of their multi-million-selling album, known as "1987 Versions" only made exclusive to Japan by the band's backing label, CBS/Sony.

The song then subsequently appeared on the 2017 reissue of the self-titled album in retrospect of the album's 30th anniversary.

== Track listing ==
All tracks written by David Coverdale, except where noted.

- 7" single

A. "Standing in the Shadow" – 3:34
B. "All or Nothing" (American Mix) – 3:40 (Coverdale, Galley)

- 1987 Remixed Version (Referred to as "Standing in the Shadows")

Track 2 of "Is This Love" UK (EMI) Version – 3:53

== Personnel ==
1984 UK Version

- David Coverdale – lead vocals
- Mel Galley – guitars
- Micky Moody – guitars
- Colin Hodgkinson – bass
- Cozy Powell – drums
- Jon Lord – keyboards, synthesizers, organs

1984 US Version

- David Coverdale – lead vocals
- John Sykes – guitars
- Neil Murray – bass
- Cozy Powell – drums
- Jon Lord – keyboards, synthesizers, organs

1987 Remixed Version

- David Coverdale – lead vocals
- John Sykes – guitars
- Neil Murray – bass
- Aynsley Dunbar – drums
- Don Airey – keyboards, synthesizers

Production

- Martin Birch – original producer, engineer, original mixing
- Keith Olsen – remixing at Goodnight Los Angeles (1984 US & 1987 remixed version)
- Greg Fulginiti – original mastering at Artisan Sound Recorders

== Charts ==
| Chart (1984) | Peak position |
|---|---|
| UK Singles (OCC) | 62 |
