= Guilty of Love =

Guilty of Love may refer to:

- "Guilty of Love" (song), a song by Whitesnake
- "Guilty of Love", a single by Shanadoo
- Guilty of Love (film), a lost 1920 American silent drama film
