= Slow an' Easy =

Promotional single by Whitesnake

from the album Slide It In
- Released: May 1984 (US)
- Recorded: 1983
- Genre: Glam metal; heavy metal; hard rock; blues rock; blues
- Length: 6:08 (album version); 4:15 (radio edit)
- Label: Geffen
- Songwriters: David Coverdale; Micky Moody
- Producer: Martin Birch

Whitesnake singles chronology
"Love Ain't No Stranger" (1984)	"Slow an' Easy" (1984)	"Still of the Night" (1987)

Music video
- "Slow an' Easy" on YouTube

"Slow an' Easy" is a song by the British rock band Whitesnake from their 1984 album Slide It In, released at the end of May 1984 in the US. The album provided the group with a commercial breakthrough in the United States, and this specific song, which was released as a promo single, became a hit on rock radio. "Slow an' Easy" and "Love Ain't No Stranger" reached #17 and #34 on Billboard's Mainstream Rock Tracks chart, respectively.

== Background ==
The song was co-written by singer David Coverdale and guitarist Micky Moody, who was the only original member, besides Coverdale, left in the band. Moody was possibly the one that influenced the bluesy style of "Slow An' Easy"; most of the material on Slide It In took influence from contemporary glam metal in terms of sound, in contrast to the earlier, blues rock based albums of the band.

In 25th Anniversary Edition of Slide It In, Coverdale comments on the songs recording by saying:

"Slow & Easy was recorded at 4 in the morning in Munich after a serious night's partying...Most of the vocals is just a live 'jam' lyric I made up to inspire the band as we recorded...I played around with the lyric later to try and make some sense of it..."

Although Moody did co-write and play the song, he soon left the band after the album's release. When guitarist John Sykes joined the band, Moody's guitars were replaced by Sykes' (along with Colin Hodgkinson's bass tracks being replaced by Neil Murray's, and Jon Lord's keyboards by Bill Cuomo). The song also features drumming by Cozy Powell. Most of the song features him kicking the bass drum, with some fills thrown in between the verses. A more basic drum beat is only prominent in the chorus and during the guitar solo.

The accompanying music video for "Slow an' Easy" was filmed in Brixton Academy in early May. It appeared on MTV later that month, which also helped to expose American audiences to Whitesnake, eventually shifting it to heavy rotation. The music video features the band performing the song on a stage, which is inter-cut with scenes of a car crash and a woman whose necklace is strangling her.

== Track list ==
1. Slow an' Easy (LP Version) - 6:08
2. Slow an' Easy (Edit) - 4:12

== Personnel ==
=== UK release ===
- David Coverdale – lead vocals
- Micky Moody – guitars
- Mel Galley – guitars, backing vocals
- Colin Hodgkinson – bass
- Cozy Powell – drums
- Jon Lord – keyboards

=== US release ===
- David Coverdale – lead vocals
- John Sykes – guitars
- Mel Galley – guitars, backing vocals
- Neil Murray – bass
- Cozy Powell – drums
- Jon Lord – keyboards

== Charts ==
Chart (1984)	Peak position
US Billboard Mainstream Rock	17
