= Slide It In =

Studio album by Whitesnake
- Released: 30 January 1984
- Recorded: 1983; 1984 (US Remix)
- Studio: Musicland (Munich)
- Genre: Hard rock; heavy metal; blues rock; glam metal
- Length: 40:40
- Label: Liberty/EMI
- Producer: Martin Birch

Whitesnake chronology
Saints & Sinners (1982)	Slide It In (1984)	1987 (1987)

Alternative cover
- Japanese American remixed cover

Alternative cover
- 25th anniversary reissue

Alternative cover
- 35th anniversary reissue

Singles from Slide It In
- 1. "Guilty of Love" Released: 1 August 1983; 2. "Give Me More Time" Released: 3 January 1984; 3. "Standing in the Shadow" Released: 16 April 1984; 4. "Love Ain't No Stranger" Released: 28 January 1985

John Sykes chronology
Life (1983)	Slide It In (1984)	1987 (1987)

Jon Lord chronology
Saints & Sinners (1982)	Slide It In (1984)	Perfect Strangers (1984)

Slide It In is the sixth studio album by British rock band Whitesnake, released on 30 January 1984 in Europe, and on 6 February in the UK by Liberty and EMI Records. To cater to the American market, the album was remixed and resequenced, and subsequently released on 16 April 1984 in North America through Geffen Records, after the group was signed to the label prior to its release. The album is widely regarded as a pivotal release for Whitesnake, as it marked their initial success in the United States and laid the groundwork for their breakthrough later in the 1980s. Notably, it was the last Whitesnake album to feature the band’s original "snake" logo. Two distinct editions of the album exist, each reflecting a different production approach. The original mix was criticised for its "flat" sound, while the remix adopted a more modern and polished production style, aligning with the growing popularity of the American glam metal scene. The remix proved instrumental in refining Whitesnake's sound, helping the band establish a stronger identity in the competitive U.S. rock market, giving it "the voice" that the group wanted. Critics have described the album as a blend of blues rock and glam metal. The remixed version, in particular, was praised for its energy and accessibility, which resonated with American audiences.

During the promotional tour for Slide It In, the band underwent significant lineup changes. Founding guitarist Micky Moody, left the group after the album's recording and was replaced by John Sykes, formerly of Thin Lizzy and Tygers of Pan Tang, while bassist Colin Hodgkinson was replaced by a returning Neil Murray. Guitarist Mel Galley also left due to a nerve injury, while longtime keyboardist Jon Lord departed the band, to rejoin the reformed Deep Purple and play on their comeback album Perfect Strangers, which was released later the same year. Drummer Cozy Powell would also leave the band, to form Emerson, Lake & Powell in January 1985, after the supporting tour finished. These changes eventually changed the band's evolution in style and sound leading into the late 1980s, while rising in popularity.

== Background ==
In 1982, Whitesnake released their fifth studio album, Saints & Sinners, which proved to be difficult as tensions between band members persisted, including a major change to their management and a lack of financial payouts, despite being a top draw in the UK. David Coverdale had temporarily put the band on hold and made permanent changes to their management personnel at that time before the record was released. New members of the band were introduced to the supporting Saints & Sinners tour as a result, with Micky Moody and Jon Lord returning. Geffen Records A&R executive, John Kalodner who had been a longtime fan of the band, convinced the label's founder, David Geffen to sign the group. Kalodner stated, "I thought David Coverdale was a star frontman, a star singer, I felt he had a mediocre band and just average songs. My job was to make them a commercial rock band for the United States."

Being cognizant of the band's future, Coverdale set his sights on the United States by signing to a major record label with Geffen, distributing Whitesnake's upcoming releases in North America. The band has also signed with Sony (known as CBS/Sony at that time) for future distributions in Japan.

== Writing and production ==
After the supporting tour, the band rehearsed for their next upcoming album at Lord's house in Oxfordshire. Coverdale had written most of the lyrics, alongside Mel Galley, who recently joined the group. Moody only had writing contributions on "Slow an' Easy".

Recordings of Slide It In began in 1983 at Musicland Studios in Munich, Germany with producer Eddie Kramer, who had been suggested to David Coverdale by John Kalodner. In the studio, the album featured drummer Cozy Powell, bassist Colin Hodgkinson, keyboardist Jon Lord, guitarist Mel Galley, and with guitarist Micky Moody returning to the band, all of whom had performed on the previous supporting Saints & Sinners tour. However, while recording, Moody's relationship with the band became strained over time, stating in a 1997 interview:

"(…) I realised that as soon as we started rehearsing and playing that it wasn't the same band, it never felt right. Mel Galley is very talented, a good singer, a great guitar player, but that band just didn't work out. Cozy was a great drummer, I always had a lot of respect for him, but he just didn't have any feel for the old Whitesnake sound. Cozy Powell brought with him a bass player called Colin Hodgkinson. Me and David knew Colin in the North East back in the sixties. He was a great legendary bass player, worked with the jazz/blues styles, but he never struck me as the bass player for Whitesnake. It was more the heavy metal attitude, probably because of Cozy's influence. He was a more heavier drummer than Ian Paice. There were flames and explosions going on, not really my cup of tea. It seems to me now that maybe Cozy wanted the band to be much more heavier and flasher."

Originally, the album was slated to be released in October following to the Monsters of Rock festival show, however, failed to meet the deadline. Internally, the band was not satisfied with Kramer's style and production, particularly the mixing of the record. Kramer was only credited to the "Guilty of Love"/"Gambler" single before he was eventually let go from his duties. As a result, the band had rehired Martin Birch, who had produced all of the band's albums in the past, to finish the record. A new release date was scheduled to be in mid November or the 30th, with the upcoming supporting tour for the album to begin in December. Yet, both of these dates were delayed until early 1984 due to personnel changes and troubled production.

According to Coverdale, John Kalodner had convinced him that in order for the band to achieve their full potential, they needed a "guitar hero" that could match Coverdale as a frontman. Candidates included Michael Schenker and Adrian Vandenberg. Schenker claims he turned down the offer to join Whitesnake, while Coverdale insists he decided to pass on Schenker. Vandenberg reluctantly declined the offer to join as well, due to the success he was having with his own band at the time. According to Coverdale, Vandenberg told him that it was the most difficult decision of his life, but they agreed to maintain contact with each other. Vandenberg was approached "four or five times" later and agreed to join Whitesnake in 1987.

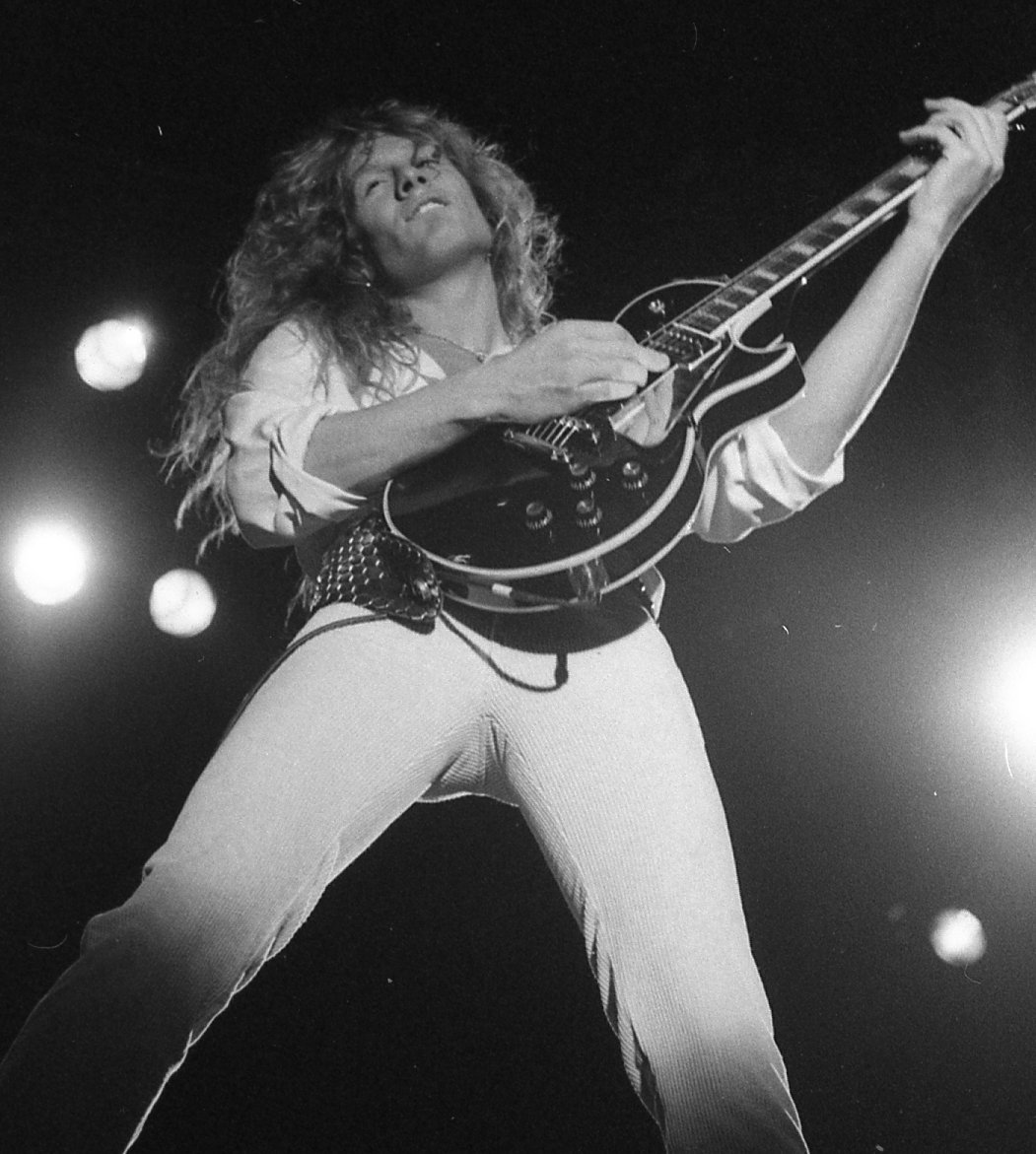
John Sykes (pictured in 1983) was approached to join the group.

Coverdale then approached Thin Lizzy guitarist John Sykes, whom he had met when Whitesnake and Thin Lizzy played some of the same festivals in Europe. Sykes was initially reluctant to join, wanting instead to continue working with Thin Lizzy frontman Phil Lynott, but after several more offers and Lynott's blessing, he accepted. Sykes recalled on the moment he had been offered and accepted on that premise:

"I had a phone call, and it was Coverdale or his people or something. They called me up and asked me if I wanted to join, and I said, “No, I don’t. I’m not interested. I’m staying with Phil.” They called up again and said, “Just come over.” I think it was Munich we went to then? They were recording the 1984 "Slide It In" album or something. I thought I’d go over and take a look. I think they called me two or three times. I went over and met David and Mel Galley, who was a really nice guy. I hung out with them for a couple of days and jammed on a couple of songs. When I came back to London, they rang out for me, offered me the job, and I said: “No, I don’t want to do it.” Then they basically said, “How much money would it take for you to do it?”, so I threw a number out there that I thought I would never get, and they said, “Okay”, and gave me the money."

Around that time, Moody had completed the upcoming record with Birch as the band finished up a European tour in late 1983. According to Moody, Coverdale's personality had changed compared to when they got to know each other in 1976, stating that they hadn't spoken for a very long time. Moody finally decided to leave Whitesnake when Coverdale embarrassed him in front of Sykes who was touring with Thin Lizzy alongside Whitesnake.

"Then one night we were in Germany and we did kind of a mini festival with Thin Lizzy and John Sykes was on guitar. Back at the hotel we were all sitting around and David was really talking a lot to John Sykes. I was sitting there quietly and David just turned around to me, pointing his fingers and said, 'Don't you ever turn your back on the audience again'. I went, 'Pardon?' He said, 'That's really unprofessional', in front of John Sykes to make me look small and I thought to myself, 'That's it'. I nearly said to him, 'Get him in the band', cause even I knew by then he wanted somebody like John Sykes, cause he looked good and he was a good guitar player. I decided to leave after finishing the end of the tour. The last gig was in Brussels in Belgium in October 83."

Apparently, this did not seem to be a major problem to Coverdale, as, according to Moody, "After the gig, I said to the tour manager, 'I want to have a meeting in my room with all the band: I have something to say'. The other band members arrived and I said, 'Where is David?'. The tour manager came and told me, 'David is entertaining people in his suite, and he won't come down.'"

Soon after Moody's departure, John Sykes was announced to the press as the new Whitesnake guitarist. At the same time it was in the news that Hodgkinson had been fired, as Coverdale felt that his style did not suit Whitesnake's new sound. As a result of Hodgkinson's departure, Neil Murray was asked to rejoin Whitesnake, simply explaining the decision by simply stating: "I'd missed his playing". Lord also informed Coverdale of his intentions to leave the group, but Coverdale convinced him to stay until the next supporting album tour was over.

After the album's initial release in the UK, it was heavily criticised for the "double-entendre drenched lyrics and titles for which Whitesnake were already infamous" and for the album mix, which was deemed "resoundingly flat". As a result, Geffen Records refused to release the album in the United States unless a new remix was commenced, due to the bad reviews about the production in the UK press. Coverdale then flew to Los Angeles to meet up about the change. He was first against the idea, but reluctantly agreed with the record label on the condition that Sykes and Murray would re-record the guitar and bass parts, respectively. The two then flew to Los Angeles to replace the tracks on 19 January, with the help of famous producer Keith Olsen remixed the album at Goodnight Los Angeles studios, further delaying its American debut. As a result, the album had its sound revamped, having a bigger and at the time a more modern sound approach. Geffen had sent cassettes for the remixed version to the band that contained some tracks. However, Coverdale's initial reaction to the remix was negative, as he was strongly unimpressed, as far as after hearing one track, Galley "threw the cassette against the wall". Coverdale recalled, "It sucks as far as I'm concerned and if that goes out, I'm not gonna be with Geffen any more. It's dynamically dull, it's lost its British bollocks." However, over time, his opinion shifted, and he came to prefer the remix to the original European version, eventually choosing not to play the latter at all. He would often listen to the remix at full volume, much to the disappointment of his bandmates. "We couldn't stand to hear them over and over like that," Murray remarked.

While Cozy Powell's drum tracks are virtually not re-recorded but instead increased its clarity into the mix, Sykes' guitar tracks were served as a top layer recorded by Galley and Moody, and would also created some different guitar solos compared to the European version. Bassist Neil Murray, who returned to the band, replaced all of the bass tracks recorded by Hodgkinson. Bill Cuomo also added additional keyboard parts to the album. Sykes didn't replace all the guitar tracks, so some of Moody's tracks were still present in the American version.

In Olsen's mixing, the American remix noticeably added and removed redundancy in instrumental and vocal parts, predominantly the echo on Coverdale's vocal and backing parts, of the record compared to the European version. Coverdale stated that the only subtle difference in the remix was that it gives "the voice" in that record "a lot better." Both the European and American mixes were recorded and mixed on analogue tapes.

== Release and promotion ==
Slide It In was released on 30 January 1984 by Liberty/EMI in Europe, and 23 March 1984 by CBS/Sony in Japan. It was remixed and later released on 16 April 1984 in North America by Geffen.

=== Commercial performance ===
The album debuted at number nine on the UK charts and number twenty-four on the Japanese Oricon albums chart. The American remix of the album debuted at number 193 at US Billboard 200 on 16 May 1984, but eventually peaked at number forty on 25 August 1984. The album ran for a consecutive 42 weeks between 1984 and 1985. By the end of the Slide It In tour, it had managed to sell 300,000 copies in the United States. Geffen acknowledged that they have not pushed the album far enough as they hoped, and wished if they have done so, the chances for the band's commercial breakthrough would've been too great for that year. Slide It In would eventually re-chart on 23 May 1987, likely resurging in sales due to the success of the 1987 album. That later added up to 85 weeks in the end, the most weeks any Whitesnake album spent on the chart, with their follow-up "most-successful" album only to be charting for 76 weeks. In total, Slide It In charted in only ten countries, with one in Hungary in the 2019 reissue. Amongst the reissue, the album recharted in the UK at number sixty-four, alongside being placed on the top of the 'Rock & Metal Albums' chart in their native.

The album was a commercial outbreak in sales, selling over 6 million copies worldwide as of present. In the United States, it was certified gold on 15 April 1986, then platinum on 10 November 1987. It was eventually certified double-platinum on 24 July 1992 as its last updated certification by the RIAA, selling over 2,000,000 copies. For digital sales, the album has sold 3,000 digital albums and 167,000 digital tracks as of 2011 according to the Nielsen SoundScan figures. According to Coverdale, the album sold over four million copies in the United States alone to this date, only half the certified units sold (8 million) on their follow-up album. The album was certified platinum in Canada, selling over 100,000 copies by March 1988. It also earned gold certifications in Japan and Sweden.

"Guilty of Love" was the first single from the album released on 1 August 1983, charting at number thirty-one in the UK. Following that came "Give Me More Time", released on 3 January 1984, peaked at number twenty-nine, also managing to chart at number twenty-seven at Ireland. The promotional single, "Slow an' Easy" provided a commercial breakthrough in the American market, charting at number seventeen in the US Mainstream Rock charts, becoming the band's first top 40 mainstream rock song in the US. "Love Ain't No Stranger" debuted at number forty-four in the UK, but notably debuted at number thirty-three on US Mainstream Rock Airplay, the second US top 40 rock hit there.

=== Touring ===
Originally, the supporting tour for the album, was slated for December, but was moved to February. Rehearsals for the album tour started on 2 February and were finished on the 15th. The European tour began in Dublin on 17 February, with the Coverdale / Sykes / Galley / Murray / Lord / Powell line-up (with Sykes' first appearance and Murray's first since re-joining the group). The band however, ran into trouble during a tour stop in Germany, where Mel Galley broke his arm after leaping on top of a parked car. He sustained nerve damage, leaving him unable to play guitar. He continued as a Whitesnake member for a time, but was forced to leave not long after, making the line-up a five-piece. Galley's last performance, with the band was in Manchester on 5 April 1984. Deep Purple's reunion was imminent, and Jon Lord played his last Whitesnake concert on 16 April 1984, at the Grand Hotel in Stockholm, Sweden which was filmed for the "Måndagsbörsen" Swedish TV show. The show itself appeared on a 2014 video album "Live in '84: Back to the Bone" (later re-released in the 35th anniversary reissue). Lord's departure, now left Whitesnake as a four-piece, not counting the off-stage keyboard player Richard Bailey, who was brought into the band.

The band toured extensively in the continuous United States all cross the country, along with the US version of the album rapidly gained airplay there. As a result, it helped the American market to open itself for Whitesnake, which the band further supported opening for Quiet Riot and Dio. The band had toured in Japan for a spot at the Super Rock '84 festival, that included Bon Jovi and Scorpions. The supporting tour would extend throughout to mid-January 1985, where they played the first musical festival installment of Rock in Rio at Rio de Janeiro, Brazil to replace Def Leppard. It was the very last appearance for this four-piece lineup, as drummer Cozy Powell left after the end of the tour, due to a relationship strained with Coverdale, caused by a lack of financial payout disputes, while Sykes would be dismissed during the Whitesnake 1987, recording sessions a year later and Murray was also let go in early 1987.

=== Reissues ===
On 8 June 2009, the album was re-issued as a two-disc digipack to commemorate its 25th anniversary. On the first disc, the CD contains the entire US mix of the album and 8 of the original UK mixes digitally remastered. The UK mixes of "Hungry for Love" and "Love Ain't No Stranger" are not included, but an acoustic version of "Love Ain't No Stranger" is featured (taken from Starkers in Tokyo). A DVD containing promo videos and live performances is also included. Another version of the 25th reissue was released by Rhino in 2017.

A deluxe remaster version was released on 8 March 2019 in a number of configurations: CD, 2CD, 2LP, and a super deluxe 6 CD+DVD box. The 6CD/DVD collection features remastered versions of the UK and US versions of Whitesnake's sixth studio album, a 35th-anniversary remix, along with previously unreleased live and studio recordings, music videos, live footage, and an interview with vocalist David Coverdale, previously released on the Japanese American mix on the album. The reissue also came separately as a double CD edition and 2LP formats featuring the remastered versions of the UK and US mixes along with bonus tracks, while a new CD/2LP contained the 35th-anniversary remix by Christopher Collier, featuring yet a different track listing.

On 25 June 2026, Craft Recordings announced its vinyl counterpart reissue along with 1987 and Slip of the Tongue, which is set to be released on 18 September.

== Title and artwork ==
The title of the album (or song) was a "tongue-in-cheek" comment that was involved in a play with people's relationships whereas a woman continues to be in an argument repeatedly while David Coverdale is responding to de-escalate the situation by being "anatomically conversant." He also stated that the title is actually "not about bananas" (a vulgar pseudonym for the word "penis," which was actually taken from the inspiration of the band's name). In a 2009 Metro interview, Coverdale remarked that people "popped their cherry" (a slang for losing their virginity or a misconception to have sex) to the album as it was intended for "pole dancing."

The album's front cover is a photo of a model with the snake wrapping around her shoulder eventually descending to her cleavage shot by Jurgen Barron Reisch, who also shot for the front cover of well-known pop/R&B artist Prince's 1979 eponymous album. When asked about the story of the album's cover art, Coverdale stated that there were two models sent in to be photographed for the upcoming album, with a seventeen-year-old female model named Franzeska on the front cover who passed out caused by a movement from the "python that draped around her shoulders [...] between her substantial glow." The original photo was cropped between the model's nose because "her eyes were rolling up" as a result of her fainting. For the back cover of the album, another unnamed model was brought in with the same situation that involved a snake's head around her neck with a similar dress that covered from her shoulder to the opposite hip.

== Reception and legacy ==
Professional ratings
Review scores
Source	Rating
AllMusic	4.5/5 stars
Collector's Guide to Heavy Metal	8/10
MusicHound Rock	4/5 stars
Rolling Stone	3.5/5 stars

Commercially, the album achieved considerable success. The album peaked at number nine on the UK Albums Chart, marking Whitesnake's fourth top-ten appearance in their native country. In the United States, the album peaked at number 40 on the Billboard 200 and eventually re-entered the charts in 1988 due to the success of their self-titled album. It was later certified double platinum by the Recording Industry Association of America (RIAA) and remains one of the band’s best-selling albums, with over six million copies sold worldwide. The singles—"Guilty of Love", "Give Me More Time", "Standing in the Shadow" and "Love Ain't No Stranger"—were released to promote the album. In the United States, "Love Ain’t No Stranger" and "Slow an' Easy" received heavy airplay on rock radio and significant exposure through their accompanying music videos on MTV. These tracks became signature songs for the band, bolstering their growing presence in the American rock scene. Slide It In was positively critiqued in music magazines and critics, particularly in North America, where it earned accolades for its fusion of blues-influenced rock and glam metal. In 2010, Martin Popoff ranked the album at #241 in his book The Top 500 Heavy Metal Albums of All Time. Its legacy is cemented as a defining release in Whitesnake’s career, bridging their early blues-rock roots with the polished, arena-ready sound that would dominate their later work.

== Track listings ==
=== UK release ===
Side one
No.	Title	Writer(s)	Length
1.	"Gambler"	David Coverdale, Mel Galley	3:57
2.	"Slide It In"	Coverdale	3:20
3.	"Standing in the Shadow"	Coverdale	3:32
4.	"Give Me More Time"	Coverdale, Galley	3:41
5.	"Love Ain't No Stranger"	Coverdale, Galley	4:13

Side two
No.	Title	Writer(s)	Length
6.	"Slow an' Easy"	Coverdale, Micky Moody	6:09
7.	"Spit It Out"	Coverdale, Galley	4:11
8.	"All or Nothing"	Coverdale, Galley	3:34
9.	"Hungry for Love"	Coverdale	3:57
10.	"Guilty of Love"	Coverdale	3:18

Japanese bonus track
No.	Title	Writer(s)	Length
11.	"Need Your Love So Bad"	Little Willie John, Mertis John Jr.	3:14

=== US and Canadian release ===
Side one
No.	Title	Writer(s)	Length
1.	"Slide It In"	Coverdale	3:20
2.	"Slow an' Easy"	Coverdale, Moody	6:08
3.	"Love Ain't No Stranger"	Coverdale, Galley	4:18
4.	"All or Nothing"	Coverdale, Galley	3:40
5.	"Gambler"	Coverdale, Galley	3:58

Side two
No.	Title	Writer(s)	Length
6.	"Guilty of Love"	Coverdale	3:24
7.	"Hungry for Love"	Coverdale	3:28
8.	"Give Me More Time"	Coverdale, Galley	3:42
9.	"Spit It Out"	Coverdale, Galley	4:26
10.	"Standing in the Shadow"	Coverdale	3:42

25th Anniversary Edition DVD
No.	Title	Length
1.	"Guilty of Love" (music video)	3:17
2.	"Slow an' Easy" (music video)	4:16
3.	"Love Ain't No Stranger" (music video)	4:33
4.	"Guilty of Love" (live at Donington 1983)	4:18
5.	"Love Ain't No Stranger" (live from Starkers in Tokyo)	3:17
6.	"Give Me More Time" (BBC TV's Top of the Pops 19/1/84)	3:37
7.	"Love Ain't No Stranger" (live from Live... In the Still of the Night)	4:28

2019 release
No.	Title	Writer(s)	Length
1.	"Gambler"	Coverdale, Galley	3:57
2.	"Slide It In"	Coverdale	3:19
3.	"Slow an' Easy"	Coverdale, Moody	6:01
4.	"Love Ain't No Stranger"	Coverdale, Galley	4:14
5.	"Give Me More Time"	Coverdale, Galley	3:42
6.	"Standing in the Shadow"	Coverdale	3:39
7.	"Hungry for Love"	Coverdale	3:29
8.	"All or Nothing"	Coverdale, Galley	3:41
9.	"Spit It Out"	Coverdale, Galley	4:28
10.	"Guilty of Love"	Coverdale	3:25

== Personnel ==
Credits are adapted from the album's liner notes.

Whitesnake

- David Coverdale – vocals
- Mel Galley – guitars, backing vocals
- Micky Moody – guitars (UK Mix), (some parts in the US Mix but uncredited)
- John Sykes – guitars (US Mix)
- Colin Hodgkinson – bass (UK Mix)
- Neil Murray – bass (US Mix)
- Cozy Powell – drums, backing vocals (Slow an' Easy)
- Jon Lord – keyboards

Additional musicians

- Bill Cuomo – additional keyboards (US Mix)
- The Fabulosa Brothers — backing vocals (All tracks with the exception of "Slow an' Easy")
- The Big 'Eads (Jimmy, Ben, Erik, Baru-Baru, Jools, Jane, Galley, Powell, Coverdale) — backing vocals (Slow an' Easy)

Technical

- Martin Birch – producer, engineering, mixing (UK Mix)
- Keith Olsen – remixing (at Goodnight Los Angeles) (US Mix)
- Eddie Kramer — original producer, mixing (1983 "Guilty of Love" single)
- Greg Fulginiti – mastering (at Artisan Sound Recorders)

Management

- John Kalodner — A&R
- Jools — coordinator

Design

- Manfred Brey — artwork, art direction
- Juren Barron Reisch – photography

Reissue (2009, 2012)

- David Coverdale — executive producer, project co-ordination
- Michael McIntyre — producer, project co-ordination
- Libby Jones — project and A&R co-ordination (in retrospect for EMI)
- Nigel Reeve — project and A&R co-ordination (in retrospect for EMI)
- Hugh Gilmour — A&R, project release co-ordination, reissue design
- Helen Owens — project manager
- Robert Ellis — live photography
- Simon Fowler — additional photography
- Chris Crayer — additional photography
- Hugh Gilmour — collector edition artwork
- Dave Donnelly — remastering (at DNA Mastering, Los Angeles)

Reissue (2019)

- David Coverdale — executive producer
- Michael McIntyre — producer
- Hugh Gilmour — A&R, reissue design, package design
- Tom Gordon — project audio coordination, restoration
- Scott Hull — remastering (at Masterdisk; Peekskill, NY
- Christopher Collier — remixing (2019 Remix)
- Mike Engstrom — product manager
- Kris Perera — product manager
- Ellys Airey — production and packaging manager

== Charts ==
=== Weekly charts ===
Chart (1984)	Peak position
European Albums (European Top 100 Albums)	18
Finnish Albums (The Official Finnish Charts)	4
German Albums (Offizielle Top 100)	14
Japanese Albums (Oricon)	24
New Zealand Albums (RMNZ)	46
Norwegian Albums (VG-lista)	11
Swedish Albums (Sverigetopplistan)	12
Swiss Albums (Schweizer Hitparade)	12
UK Albums (OCC)	9
US Billboard 200	40

Chart (2019)	Peak position
Belgian Albums (Ultratop Flanders)	144
Belgian Albums (Ultratop Wallonia)	45
French Albums (SNEP)	188
Hungarian Albums (MAHASZ)	37
Japanese Albums (Oricon)	48
Japanese Hot Albums (Billboard Japan)	86
Scottish Albums (OCC)	20
Spanish Albums (Promusicae)	63
UK Rock & Metal Albums (OCC)	1

=== Year-end charts ===
Chart (1984)	Position
US Billboard 200	146

Chart (1987)	Position
US Billboard 200	149

== Certifications ==
Region	Certification	Certified units/sales
Canada (Music Canada)	Platinum	100,000^{^}
Japan (RIAJ)	Gold	100,000^{^}
Sweden (GLF)	Gold	50,000^{^}
United States (RIAA)	2× Platinum	4,000,000
Summaries
Worldwide	—	6,000,000
^{^} Shipments figures based on certification alone.

== Release history ==
Region	Date	Label(s)	Format(s)	Edition(s)	Mix(es)	Ref.
Europe	30 January 1984	EMI; Liberty	LP; cassette	Standard	European	
United Kingdom	6 February 1984	EMI; Liberty	LP; cassette	Standard	European	
Japan	23 March 1984	Geffen; CBS/Sony	CD; LP; cassette	Standard	European	
North America	16 April 1984	Geffen	LP; cassette	Standard	American	
Japan	21 December 1984	Geffen; CBS/Sony	LP	Standard	American	
United Kingdom	11 March 1985	EMI; Liberty	Picture disc	Limited	American	
North America	1987	Geffen	CD; longbox	Standard	American	
United Kingdom	11 April 1988	EMI	CD; LP	Standard	European	
Japan	30 September 1988	CBS/Sony	CD	Standard	Both	
Various	18 December 2006	Parlophone	Digital download; streaming	Standard	European	
Europe	8 June 2009	EMI	CD; DVD	25th	Both	
North America	30 June 2009	Geffen; UM^{e}	CD; DVD	25th	Both	
Various	8 March 2019	Rhino; Parlophone; Saltburn	CD; DVD; LP; digital download; streaming	35th	Both; 2019 Remix	
Japan	27 March 2019	Rhino; Parlophone; Saltburn	CD; DVD; LP; SHM-CD	35th	Both; 2019 Remix	
Various	10 April 2020	Rhino; Parlophone; Saltburn	LP	Limited	2019 Remix	
Various	6 January 2026	Craft Recordings; Concord	Streaming; digital download	Reissue	Both; 2019 Remix	
Various	18 September 2026	Craft Recordings; Concord	LP	Reissue	American	
