= Guilty of Love (song) =

Single by Whitesnake

from the album Slide It In
- B-side: "Gambler"
- Released: 1 August 1983
- Recorded: 1983
- Genre: Hard rock, Blues rock
- Length: 3:18
- Label: Liberty Records
- Songwriter: David Coverdale
- Producer: Eddie Kramer

Whitesnake singles chronology
"Victim of Love" (1982)	"Guilty of Love" (1983)	"Give Me More Time" (1984)

"Guilty of Love" is a song by the British rock band Whitesnake from their 1984 album Slide It In. Written by vocalist David Coverdale, he described the track as a "very simple and honest love song". It has frequently been compared to Thin Lizzy for its dual lead guitars.

== Background ==
The song was released as the lead single from Slide It In on 1 August 1983. Its release coincided with Whitesnake headlining the Monsters of Rock festival at Castle Donington, England. The B-side features the track "Gambler", also found on Slide It In. These are the only two officially released Whitesnake songs to be produced by Eddie Kramer. At the time, Kramer was producing Slide It In, but the band found it difficult adapting to his way of working, particularly his method of mixing the record. Kramer was eventually let go and replaced by Martin Birch, who had produced all of Whitesnake's previous albums. "Guilty of Love" reached number 31 on the UK Singles Chart. A music video was also shot at the Monsters of Rock show on 20 August 1983, directed by Lindsey Clennell.

== Track listing ==
- 7" single (UK)
1. "Guilty of Love" - 3:18 (David Coverdale)
2. "Gambler" - 3:50 (Coverdale/Mel Galley)

== Personnel ==
- David Coverdale – lead vocals, percussion
- Micky Moody – guitars
- Mel Galley – guitars, backing vocals
- Colin Hodgkinson – bass
- Cozy Powell – drums
- Jon Lord – keyboards
- Eddie Kramer – production

== Charts ==
Chart (1983)	Position
UK Singles Chart	31
