= Soft Machine discography =

- Studio albums: 13

Soft Machine are an English rock band from Canterbury formed in mid-1966. As a central band of the Canterbury scene, the group became one of the first British psychedelic acts and later moved into progressive rock and jazz fusion. Having known numerous line-ups, the band currently consists of John Etheridge (guitar), Theo Travis (saxophone, flutes, keyboards), Fred Baker (bass) and Asaf Sirkis (drums).

== Discography ==
=== Studio albums ===
Year	Album	Line-up	Additional musicians
1968	The Soft Machine	Mike Ratledge, Robert Wyatt, Kevin Ayers	Hugh Hopper, The Cake
1969	Volume Two	Ratledge, Wyatt, Hugh Hopper	Brian Hopper
1970	Third	Ratledge, Wyatt, H. Hopper, Elton Dean	Lyn Dobson, Nick Evans, Jimmy Hastings, Rab Spall
1971	Fourth	Ratledge, Wyatt, H. Hopper, Elton Dean	Evans, Hastings, Mark Charig, Roy Babbington, Alan Skidmore
1972	Fifth	Side 1: Ratledge, H. Hopper, Dean, Phil Howard; Side 2: Ratledge, H. Hopper, Dean, John Marshall	Babbington
1973	Six (Disc 2)	Ratledge, H. Hopper, Marshall, Karl Jenkins	
1973	Seven	Ratledge, Marshall, Jenkins, Babbington	
1975	Bundles	Ratledge, Marshall, Jenkins, Babbington, Allan Holdsworth	Ray Warleigh
1976	Softs	Marshall, Jenkins, Babbington, John Etheridge, Alan Wakeman	Ratledge
1981	Land of Cockayne	Marshall, Jenkins, Holdsworth, Warleigh, Jack Bruce, Stu Calver, Dick Morrissey, Alan Parker, John Perry, Tony Rivers, John Taylor	
2018	Hidden Details	Marshall, Etheridge, Babbington, Theo Travis	Nick Utteridge
2023	Other Doors	Marshall, Etheridge, Travis, Fred Baker	Babbington
2026	Thirteen	Etheridge, Travis, Baker, Asaf Sirkis	

=== Contemporary live albums ===
Recorded	Released	Album	Line-up	Additional musicians
20 October – 1 November 1972	1973	Six (Disc 1)	Mike Ratledge, Hugh Hopper, John Marshall, Karl Jenkins	
6 – 9 July 1977 (includes one studio track recorded later in July 1977)	1978	Alive & Well: Recorded in Paris	Marshall, Jenkins, John Etheridge, Ric Sanders, Steve Cook	Ratledge (on studio track "Soft Space")
1 February 2019	2020	Live at The Baked Potato	Marshall, Etheridge, Roy Babbington, Theo Travis	

=== Archival live albums ===
Recorded (exact dates given unless unconfirmed)	Released	Album	Line-up
April – 10 December 1967 (includes some studio recordings)	2001	Soft Machine Turns On Volume 1	April – June 1967 recordings: Mike Ratledge, Robert Wyatt, Kevin Ayers, Daevid Allen; 22 September – 10 December 1967 recordings: Ratledge, Wyatt, Ayers
September 1967 – May 1968	2006	Middle Earth Masters	Ratledge, Wyatt, Ayers
10 November 1967 – 11 August 1968	2001	Soft Machine Turns On Volume 2	Ratledge, Wyatt, Ayers
29 March 1969	1996	Live at the Paradiso 1969	Ratledge, Wyatt, Hugh Hopper
4 January 1970	2000	Noisette	Ratledge, Wyatt, H. Hopper, Elton Dean, Lynn Dobson
17 January 1970	2022	Facelift France & Holland (Disc 2)	Ratledge, Wyatt, H. Hopper, Elton Dean, Lynn Dobson
31 January 1970	2005	Breda Reactor	Ratledge, Wyatt, H. Hopper, Elton Dean, Lynn Dobson
2 March 1970	2022	Facelift France & Holland (Disc 1 + DVD)	Ratledge, Wyatt, H. Hopper, Elton Dean, Lynn Dobson
20 – 25 April 1970	2004	Somewhere in Soho	Ratledge, Wyatt, H. Hopper, Dean
26 April 1970	2002	Facelift	Ratledge, Wyatt, H. Hopper, Dean
November 1969 – May 1970	2002	Backwards	November 1969 recordings: Ratledge, Wyatt, H. Hopper, Dean, Dobson, Mark Charig, Nick Evans; May 1970 recordings: Ratledge, Wyatt, H. Hopper, Dean
13 August 1970	1988	Live at the Proms 1970 (re-released as disc 2 on 2007 remaster of Third)	Ratledge, Wyatt, H. Hopper, Dean
25 October 1970	2006	Grides (also includes a DVD of 23 March 1971 Beat Club appearance)	Ratledge, Wyatt, H. Hopper, Dean
27 – 28 February 1971	2024	Høvikodden 1971	Ratledge, Wyatt, H. Hopper, Dean
28 February 1971	2009	Live at Henie Onstad Art Centre 1971 (this concert later included on Høvikodden 1971 with another concert at the same venue the previous day)	Ratledge, Wyatt, H. Hopper, Dean
11 March 1971	1993	Soft Machine & Heavy Friends: BBC in Concert 1971	Ratledge, Wyatt, H. Hopper, Dean
23 March 1971	1998	Virtually (DVD with footage of this recording included on Grides)	Ratledge, Wyatt, H. Hopper, Dean
5 December 1967 – 1 June 1971	2003	BBC Radio 1967 – 1971	Various line-ups including Ratledge, Wyatt, Ayers, H. Hopper, Brian Hopper, Dean, Dobson, Charig and Evans
10 June 1969 – 15 November 1971	1990	The Peel Sessions (all tracks here later included with others on BBC Radio 1967 – 1971 and BBC Radio 1971 – 1974)	Various line-ups including Ratledge, Wyatt, H. Hopper, B. Hopper, Dean, Dobson, Charig, Evans and Phil Howard
November 1971	2008	Drop	Ratledge, H. Hopper, Dean, Howard
2 May 1972	1994	Live in France (re-released with same content as Live in Paris in 2004)	Ratledge, H. Hopper, Dean, John Marshall
20 July 1972	1994	Soft Stage: BBC in Concert 1972	Ratledge, H. Hopper, Marshall, Karl Jenkins
17 May 1973	2010	NDR Jazz Workshop Hamburg, Germany (also includes a DVD of the concert)	Ratledge, Marshall, Jenkins, Roy Babbington
26 October 1973	2023	The Dutch Lesson	Ratledge, Marshall, Jenkins, Roy Babbington
15 November 1971 – 10 June 1974	2003	BBC Radio 1971 – 1974	Various line-ups including Ratledge, H. Hopper, Dean, Howard, Marshall, Jenkins, Babbington and Allan Holdsworth
4 July 1974	2015	Switzerland 1974 (also includes a DVD of the concert)	Ratledge, Marshall, Jenkins, Babbington, Holdsworth
29 January 1975	2006	Floating World Live	Ratledge, Marshall, Jenkins, Babbington, Holdsworth
11 October 1975	2005	British Tour '75	Ratledge, Marshall, Jenkins, Babbington, John Etheridge

=== Archival studio recordings ===
Recorded	Released	Album	Line-up
April 1967	1972	Jet Propelled Photographs (gained this title in 1988, previously released under various other titles including Faces and Places Vol. 7 and At the Beginning)	Mike Ratledge, Robert Wyatt, Kevin Ayers, Daevid Allen
Circa Spring/Summer 1969	1996	Spaced	Ratledge, Wyatt, Hugh Hopper, Brian Hopper

=== Compilation albums ===
Year	Album	Notes
1977	Triple Echo	Triple album covering the band's whole history to that point, featuring select tracks from all the albums up to Softs, the most recent at the time, plus the band's first single "Love Makes Sweet Music" and its B-side "Feelin' Reelin' Squeelin'" (both later included on the 2009 remaster of The Soft Machine), and several unreleased recordings, all later included among the archival albums listed above except the version of "She's Gone" which was put on the various artists CD White Bicycle: Making Music In The 1960 - The Joe Boyd Story, released to coincide with Boyd's book of the same name, by Fledg'ling Records in 2006.

=== Other minor releases ===
These albums were either released by small labels with most of their content available on the main albums listed above or are reissues/"Best of" collections released by major labels with all previously released material.

Year	Album	Notes
1972	Rock Generation Vol. 7	One side only, April 1967 De Lane Lea Studios demo recordings with Giorgio Gomelsky.
1972	Rock Generation Vol. 8	One side only, more April 1967 demo recordings. This and the preceding entry were combined on many subsequent releases, under such titles as Faces & Places Vol.7 (BYG Records, 1972), At the Beginning (Charly Records, 1976), Jet Propelled Photographs (Piccadilly, 1980 [LP], Charly, 2003 [CD]), and several others. These issues contain the track "She's Gone", recorded in April 1967, which is not the same track released in Triple Echo.
1975	1&2 (Architects of Space Time)	Double album reissue of the first two albums.
1990	The Untouchable	Compilation of tracks from Bundles, Softs, and Alive and Well.
1991	As If...	Curious (probably unauthorized) compilation with six Ratledge/Hopper compositions ranging from 1970's Third to 1973's Six.
1994	Soft Machine	Live At The Paradiso 1969 plus six tracks from Jet Propelled Photographs.
1995	The Harvest Albums 1975–1978	Box set of the Harvest-era albums Bundles (1975) to Alive & Well (1978).
1998	Canterburied Sounds (Vol. 1–4)	Voiceprint Records released four CDs containing several tracks by various musicians from the Canterbury scene (mainly from the Soft Machine and the Caravan bands), compiled and with notes by Brian Hopper. The four single CDs are re-released in 2013 in a box set.
1998	Live 1970 (also known as Live in Europe 1970)	Tracks 1–2 recorded on 13 February 1970 at Swansea (or 14 at the London School of Economics); tracks 3–11 also in Live at the Proms; here, with the edited version of "Out-Bloody-Rageous" from 11:54 to 8:46, and "Esther's Nose Job" split in seven contiguous tracks.
1999	Fourth / Fifth	CD reissue of Fourth and Fifth, the first CBS-era album Third was already available on CD individually.
2001	Man in a Deaf Corner: Anthology 1963–1970	Disc 1 mainly containing live pieces from 1963 to circa 1967, with tracks 7–9 also in Turns On vol. 1 (respectively tracks 2, 1, 16); Disc 2 containing a recording at the Paradiso, 29 March 1969 (tracks 1–10) also in Live at the Paradiso (about 32 min out of 40 min); tracks 11–12 ("Facelift" and "Moon in June" – short versions) also in Live 1970 (respectively tracks 1–2); tracks 13–16 recorded at the Fairfield Halls in Croydon on 26 April 1970, also in Facelift (respectively tracks 4–7); track 17 is a Jakko Jakszyk rendition of "As Long as He Lies Perfectly Still" in conjunction with the two short tracks "That Still and Perfect Summer" and "Astral Projection in Pinner" to appear in his future album The Bruised Romantic Glee Club (Iceni 2006).
2004	Six / Seven	2-CD reissue of the last two CBS-era albums Six and Seven.
2005	Out-Bloody-Rageous: An Anthology 1967–1973	2-CD compilation of tracks from up to, and including, Seven.
2005	Orange Skin Food	2-CD compilation of previously released live recordings; tracks from Somewhere In Soho, recorded 20–25 April 1971, Facelift, recorded 26 April 1970 and the entire Live in Europe 1970, recorded 13 or 14 February 1970 and 13 August 1970 at the Proms.
2010	Original Album Classics	5-CD box set of the 2007 remasters of the CBS-era albums Third, Fourth, Fifth, Six and Seven.
2011	Tales of Taliesin: The EMI Years Anthology 1975–1981	2-CD compilation of tracks from Bundles to Land of Cockayne.
2013	68	Credited to Robert Wyatt, it nonetheless contains an 18 minutes early version of "Rivmic Melodies" (to appear in the 1969 album Volume 2) and a 20 minutes early version of "Moon in June" (to appear in the 1970 album Third), both recorded in U.S. in 1968, after Soft Machine's first dissolution, and just before the new formation with Hopper in place of Ayers.
2013	Canterburied Sounds	Re-issue in a single 4 CDs edition of the four titles previously released in 1998 by Brian Hopper on Voiceprint.
2014	Tanglewood Tails	2 CDs, Disc 1 with tracks 1–4 from 1963 (also in "Canterburied Sounds"), tracks 5–12 from 1967 studio recordings (also in Turns On vol. 1); Disc 2 with tracks 1–4 live from the Col Ballroom, Davenport, Iowa, 11 August 1968 (also in Turns On vol. 2), tracks 5–6 live from the Paradiso, Amsterdam, 29 March 1969 (also in Live at the Paradiso), tracks 7–11 live from the Fairfield Halls, Croydon, 26 April 1970 (also in "Facelift"). The quality of tracks are far better than in both volumes of Turns On (especially "She's Gone" – June 1967 version that now has a quality comparable to the Triple Echo version – that is up to now the only acceptable CD version of this track).
2014	Turns On (An early collection)	2 CDs – Reprint from Floating World Records of the two Turns On volumes of 2001, with the same track list. The low quality of the former editions was here maintained.
2014	Live in 1970	4 CDs – Reprint of two live concerts. Disc 1 and Disc 2 recorded at Ronnie Scott's Jazz Club on 20–25 April 1970 (already in Somewhere in Soho, Voiceprint, 2004), Disc 3 and Disc 4 recorded at Het Turfschip, Breda, Netherlands on 31 January 1970 (already in Breda Reactor, Voiceprint, 2005).
2014	Live in the 70s	4 CDs – Reprint of various live concerts. Disc 1 and the first four tracks on Disc 2 also issued as Live in Paris (Cuneiform, 2004); tracks 5–7 of Disc 2 also appear on Backwards (Cuneiform, 2002); Mark Charig is here wrongly mentioned as the trumpet player; Disc 3 was previously released as Noisette (Cuneiform, 2000) and Disc 4 was previously issued as Drop (Moonjune, 2008).
2015	Hugh Hopper; Volume 9: Anatomy of Facelift	Five performances of "Facelift", 1969 through 1971.
2019	Live in London in the early Sixties (LP)	Eight tracks recorded live in 1963 in London, with Brian Hopper (sax), Hugh Hopper (cello, bass), Robert Wyatt (drums, voice), Kevin Ayers (bass, voice), Mike Ratledge (organ), Daevid Allen (guitar). These tracks are also in Man in a Deaf Corner (2001, 2 CD) as tracks 1.01–1.06 in a different remix.
2019	Top Gear Live in London 1967–1969 (LP)	Side 1 recorded in 1967 with the Ratledge/Wyatt/Ayers line-up; Side 2 recorded in 1969 with Ratledge/Wyatt/H. Hopper/B. Hopper line-up and including "Facelift" and "Moon in June".

=== Singles ===
- 1967: "Love Makes Sweet Music"/"Feelin' Reelin' Squeelin'" (Line-up: Mike Ratledge, Robert Wyatt, Kevin Ayers, Daevid Allen) (Released in the UK and New Zealand, both the A- and B-side were later included on Triple Echo in 1977, the first time either appeared on an album)
- 1968: "Joy of a Toy"/"Why Are We Sleeping?" (Line-up: Ratledge, Wyatt, Ayers) (Both A- and B-side from the album The Soft Machine, single released in the US and Japan)
- 1978: "Soft Space (Part 1)"/"Soft Space (Part 2)" (Line-up: John Marshall, Karl Jenkins, John Etheridge, Ric Sanders, Steve Cook) (From the album Alive and Well, single released in the UK and most other European countries)
- 2024: "The Dew at Dawn"/"(Slightly) Slightly All the Time" (Line-up: Etheridge, Theo Travis, Fred Baker, Asaf Sirkis) (Released in the UK and online)

=== Bootlegs ===
==== The 1960s ====
1968

- 1968, 08–11, Live at Davenport, Iowa (supporting The Jimi Hendrix Experience) (line-up: Mike Ratledge, Robert Wyatt, Kevin Ayers)
- 1968, 08–16, Live at the Merryweather Post Pavilion in Columbia, Maryland (supporting The Jimi Hendrix Experience) (line-up: same as previous)
- 1968, 09–14, Live at the Hollywood Bowl, California (supporting The Jimi Hendrix Experience) (line-up: same as previous; Kevin Ayers' last gig with Soft Machine and the band's last gig of 1968)

1969

- 1969, 04–13, Live at the Country Club in London (line-up: Ratledge, Wyatt, Hugh Hopper)
- 1969, 06–25, Live at the Ba.Ta.Clan in Paris (line-up: same as previous; Brian Hopper was in the band at this time but is absent from this show)
- 1969, 08–09, Live at Plumpton Race Course – only "Moon in June" was performed (line-up: Ratledge, Wyatt, H. Hopper, B. Hopper)
- 1969, 10–05, Live at the Lyceum in London (line-up: Ratledge, Wyatt, H. Hopper; B. Hopper was in the band at this time but is absent from this show)
- 1969, 10–27, Live at the Liverpool University – Excerpt (line-up: Ratledge, Wyatt, H. Hopper, Elton Dean, Lyn Dobson, Mark Charig, Nick Evans; Dean, Dobson, Charig and Evans' first gig with Soft Machine)
- 1969, 10–28, Live at Actuel Festival in Amougies, Belgium – Excerpt (line-up: same as previous)

==== The 1970s ====
1970

- 1970, 01–04, Live at the Fairfield Halls, Croydon – This concert was published as Noisette (Cuneiform, 2000), but this official release lacks "Facelift" that was in part used for the Third album (1970), where it is joined by another version recorded 11 January and overdubbed. This concert is inserted here only because the version of "Facelift" herein contained (over 25 minutes long) is a very special version and the full song would deserve an official treatment. (line-up: Ratledge, Wyatt, H. Hopper, Dean, Dobson; first gig of this five-piece line-up and Soft Machine's first gig of the 1970s)
- 1970, 01–17, Live at the Concertgebouw in Amsterdam (line-up: same as previous)
- 1970, 04–04, Live at the Kolner Festival, Germany (line-up: Ratledge, Wyatt, H. Hopper, Dean; first gig of this four-piece line-up)
- 1970, 09–01, BBC Radiophonic Workshop – "Eamonn Andrews explained" (line-up: same as previous)
- 1970, 09–17, Alan Black "Sound of the Seventies" (broadcast 25 Sept.), recorded at the Camden Theatre in London (line-up: same as previous)
- 1970, 10–24, Live at DeDoelen, Rotterdam – Excerpt (line-up: same as previous)

1971

- 1971, 02–07, Live at the Roundhouse, London, UK (line-up: same as previous)
- 1971, 03–21, Live in Het Turfschip, Breda, Netherlands (line-up: same as previous)
- 1971, 06–07, Live at the Cafe au Go Go (the Gaslight) in New York City (line-up: same as previous)
- 1971, 10–17, Donaueschinger Musiktage – This concert has appeared partially on Drop (Moonjune 2008) (line-up: Ratledge, H. Hopper, Dean, Phil Howard)
- 1971, 11–07, Live at the Berlin Jazz Festival – There exist two versions of this concert: the live recording and the radio broadcast (with German DJ inserts) – this concert has appeared partially on Drop (Moonjune 2008) (line-up: same as previous)

1972

- 1972, 04–22, Live at Palazzo dello Sport in Bergamo, Italy (line-up: Ratledge, H. Hopper, Dean, John Marshall)
- 1972, 04–24, Live at the Piper Club in Rome (line-up: same as previous)
- 1972, 07–07, Live at King's Cross Cinema (line-up: Ratledge, H. Hopper, Marshall, Karl Jenkins; Karl Jenkins' first gig with Soft Machine)
- 1972, 12–03, Live at Fairfield Halls, Croydon, UK (line-up: same as previous)

1974

- 1974, 03–11, Radio Interview with Mike Ratledge and Allan Holdsworth for an American radio broadcast
- 1974, 03–13, Live at Syracuse University in Syracuse, New York (line-up: Ratledge, Marshall, Jenkins, Roy Babbington, Allan Holdsworth)
- 1974, 03–17, Live at "My Father's Place" in Roslyn, New York (line-up: same as previous)
- 1974, 03–23–24, Live at the Howard Stein's Academy of Music in New York (line-up: same as previous)
- 1974, 08–10, Live at Le Naiadi, Pescara, Italy (line-up: same as previous)
- 1974, 09–20–24, Villa Pamphili Festival in Rome (line-up: same as previous)

1975

- 1975, 01–16, Live in Stuttgart, Germany (line-up: same as previous)
- 1975, 08–17, Live at the Théâtre antique d'Orange, Orange Festival in France (line-up: Ratledge, Marshall, Jenkins, Babbington, John Etheridge)
- 1975, 08–24, Live at the Reading Festival, UK (line-up: same as previous)
- 1975, 08–29, Live in Vienna (line-up: same as previous)
- 1975, 11–26, Live at the Cinéma Variétés in Marseille, France (line-up: same as previous)

1976

- 1976, 02–18, Live at the Palasport in Reggio Emilia, Italy (line-up: Ratledge, Marshall, Jenkins, Babbington, Etheridge, Alan Wakeman)
- 1976, 08–08, Live in Trieste, Italy (line-up: Marshall, Jenkins, Babbington, Etheridge, Ray Warleigh)
- 1976, 10–09, Live in Roskilde, Copenhagen (line-up: Marshall, Jenkins, Etheridge, Ric Sanders, Percy Jones)
- 1976, 12–13, Live at the Palais des Sports in Paris (line-up: Marshall, Jenkins, Etheridge, Sanders, Steve Cook)

== Related bands, projects & tributes discography ==
=== Discography ===
The following are either albums which include contributions from at least two members of Soft Machine or are Soft Machine tribute albums featuring contributions from at least one member.

Year	Album	Soft Machine members involved
The Wilde Flowers
1965–69	The Wilde Flowers (released in 1994)	Ayers, B. Hopper, H. Hopper, Wyatt
The Graham Collier Septet
1967	Deep Dark Blue Center	Jenkins, Marshall
1969	Down Another Road	Jenkins, Marshall
Kevin Ayers
1969	Joy of a Toy	Ayers, H. Hopper, Ratledge, Wyatt
1970	Shooting at the Moon	Ayers, Wyatt
1971	Whatevershebringswesing	Ayers, Wyatt
1973	Bananamour	Ayers, Ratledge, Wyatt
1974	The Confessions of Dr. Dream and Other Stories	Ayers, Ratledge
2007	The Unfairground	Ayers, H. Hopper
Jack Bruce
1969	Songs for a Tailor	Bruce, Marshall
1971	Harmony Row	Bruce, Marshall
1989	A Question of Time	Bruce, Holdsworth
Robert Wyatt
1970	The End of an Ear	Wyatt, Charig, Evans
1974	Rock Bottom	Wyatt, H. Hopper
Nucleus
1970	Elastic Rock	Jenkins, Marshall
1971	We'll Talk About It Later	Jenkins, Marshall
1971	Solar Plexus	Jenkins, Marshall
1974	Labyrinth	Babbington, MacRae
The Keith Tippett Group
1970	You Are Here... I Am There	Charig, Dean, Evans
1971	Dedicated To You, But You Weren't Listening	Babbington, Charig, Dean, Evans, Howard, Wyatt
Neil Ardley / Ian Carr / Don Rendell
1970	Greek Variations & Other Aegean Exercises	Babbington, Bruce, Jenkins, Marshall
Syd Barrett
1970	The Madcap Laughs	H. Hopper, Ratledge, Wyatt
Nick Drake
1970	Bryter Layter	Dobson, Warleigh
King Crimson
1970	Lizard	Charig, Evans
Andrew Lloyd Webber / Tim Rice
1970	Jesus Christ Superstar	Jenkins, Marshall
Daevid Allen
1971	Banana Moon	Allen, Evans, Wyatt
Elton Dean
1971	Elton Dean (re-released as Just Us in 1998)	Dean, Babbington, Charig, Howard, Ratledge
1976	Oh! for the Edge	Dean, Charig, Evans
1977	Happy Daze	Dean, Charig
1980	Boundaries	Dean, Charig
1985	The Bologna Tapes	Dean, Evans
1985	Two's & Three's	Dean, Etheridge
Centipede
1971	Septober Energy	Babbington, Charig, Dean, Evans, Jenkins, Marshall, Wyatt
Linda Hoyle
1971	Pieces of Me	Jenkins, Marshall
Matching Mole
1972	Matching Mole	MacRae, Wyatt
1972	Matching Mole's Little Red Record	MacRae, Wyatt
Ian Carr
1972	Belladonna	Babbington, Holdsworth, MacRae, Wakeman
Barry Guy
1972	Ode	Charig, Jenkins, Wakeman
Hugh Hopper
1973	1984	H. Hopper, Evans, Marshall
1976	Hopper Tunity Box	H. Hopper, Charig, Dean
Ray Warleigh
1973	Reverie	Warleigh, Taylor
Karl Jenkins
1976	Rubber Riff (re-released under the Soft Machine name in 1994)	Jenkins, Babbington, Etheridge, Marshall
1995	Adiemus: Songs of Sanctuary	Jenkins, Ratledge
Hopper / Dean / Tippett / Gallivan
1977	Cruel But Fair	H. Hopper, Dean
1977	Mercy Dash (released in 1985)	H. Hopper, Dean
Elton Dean / Alan Skidmore / Chris Laurence / John Marshall
1977	El Skid	Dean, Marshall
Planet Earth
1978	Planet Earth	Jenkins, Ratledge
Hugh Hopper / Elton Dean / Alan Gowen / Dave Sheen (re-released as Soft Head in 1996)
1978	Rogue Element	H. Hopper, Dean
Soft Heap
1979	Soft Heap	Dean, H. Hopper
1979	Al Dente (released in 2008)	Dean, H. Hopper
1982–83	A Veritable Centaur (released in 1995)	Dean
Rubba
1979	Push Button	Jenkins, Ratledge
Rollercoaster
1980	Wonderin'	Jenkins, Morrissey, Parker, Ratledge, Warleigh
2nd Vision
1980	First Steps	Etheridge, Sanders
Karl Jenkins / Mike Ratledge
1981	Cuts for Commercials Vol. 3	Jenkins, Ratledge
1981	For Christmas, For Children	Jenkins, Ratledge
2010	Movement	Jenkins, Ratledge
2010	Some Shufflin'	Jenkins, Ratledge
Allan Holdsworth
1982	I.O.U.	Holdsworth, Carmichael
Andy Summers
1992	Invisible Threads	Summers, Etheridge
Theo Travis
1994	View From the Edge	Travis, Marshall
Hugh Hopper / Elton Dean / Vince Clarke / Frances Knight
1998	The Mind in the Trees	H. Hopper, Dean
Mashall / Travis / Wood
1998	Bodywork	Marshall, Travis
Gong
2000	Zero to Infinity	Allen, Travis
2009	2032	Allen, Travis
Polysoft
2002	Tribute To Soft Machine: Live At Le Triton 2002 (released in 2003)	Dean, H. Hopper
Soft Works
2003	Abracadabra	Dean, Holdsworth, H. Hopper, Marshall
2003	Abracadabra in Osaka (released in 2020)	Dean, Holdsworth, H. Hopper, Marshall
2003	Abracadabra in Tokyo (released in 2025)	Dean, Holdsworth, H. Hopper, Marshall
Soft Mountain
2003	Soft Mountain (released in 2007)	Dean, H. Hopper
Soft Bounds
2004	Live at Le Triton 2004(released in 2005)	Dean, H. Hopper
2006	Soft Boundaries (released 2014 under Hugh Hopper's name as v7 of the Dedicated to Hugh CD series)	Dean, H. Hopper
Soft Machine Legacy
2005	Live In Zaandam	Dean, Etheridge, H. Hopper, Marshall
2006	Soft Machine Legacy	Dean, Etheridge, H. Hopper, Marshall
2006	Live at the New Morning	Dean, Etheridge, H. Hopper, Marshall
2007	Steam	Etheridge, H. Hopper, Marshall, Travis
2010	Live Adventures	Babbington, Etheridge, Marshall, Travis
2013	Burden of Proof	Babbington, Etheridge, Marshall, Travis
Delta Saxophone Quartet
2007	Dedicated To You But You Weren't Listening: The Music Of Soft Machine	H. Hopper (as a guest on some tracks)
Ric Sanders
2008	Still Waters	Sanders, Etheridge
