= Phil Howard (musician) =

Australian jazz drummer

Phil Howard is an Australian jazz drummer best known for his brief stint with the jazz-rock group Soft Machine. Howard arrived in London from his native Australia in 1969, joining the band Caparius led by saxophonist Clive Stevens, alongside guitarist Peter Martin and bassist Neville Whitehead. The band's final line-up, in 1971, replaced Martin with future Isotope guitarist/leader Gary Boyle and pianist Dave MacRae.

Howard first came to the attention of Soft Machine when Robert Wyatt almost left in August 1970 and auditions for a potential replacement were held. In the end, Wyatt changed his mind, but Softs saxophonist Elton Dean borrowed Howard and fellow Caparian Whitehead as the rhythm section in his extracurricular Just Us group. Both were featured on Dean's eponymous 1971 solo album, and both were also members of the Keith Tippett Group during this period. A live radio session by Soft Machine in March 1971, in which the Dean group participated, saw Howard reinforcing the Softs on one piece, the one instance of Wyatt and Howard drumming together. In August 1971, Wyatt left and Howard was drafted in at Dean's insistence, although the other members of the group had Nucleus drummer John Marshall in mind (but Marshall had just joined Jack Bruce's band). Howard played with the band on British and European tours during the Autumn, but he was fired after recording the first side of the album Fifth in December 1971. Mike Ratledge and Hugh Hopper thought the band was getting too free-form.

Howard remained in Dean's group, now christened Just Us, for one more year, but his trail went cold after 1972, although there was one interesting postscript when, in typical Canterbury Scene fashion, he participated in the one-off Lol Coxhill-Richard Sinclair Quintet assembled for a French jazz festival in late 1975, alongside Dave MacRae and ex-East Of Eden violinist Dave Arbus. Liner notes for a late 1970s reissue of Fifth mentioned that he was last heard of working on a North Sea oil rig. None of his former musical associates know of his whereabouts.
