= Steam (Soft Machine Legacy album) =

Studio album by Soft Machine Legacy
- Released: February 2007
- Recorded: 28–30 December 2006
- Studio: Temple Music Studio, Surrey, South East England
- Genre: Jazz rock
- Length: 64:04
- Label: MoonJune Records MJR016
- Producer: Soft Machine Legacy

Soft Machine Legacy chronology
Live at the New Morning (2006)	Steam (2007)	Live Adventures (2010)

Professional ratings
Review scores
Source	Rating
AllMusic	4/5 stars
All About Jazz	5/5 stars

Steam is the fourth album by the Canterbury associated band Soft Machine Legacy and their second studio album, released on CD in 2007. This is the final Soft Machine project to feature bassist Hugh Hopper prior to his death in June 2009. He was replaced by Roy Babbington, Soft Machine member from 1973 to 1976. Babbington has previously replaced Hopper in Soft Machine-proper. Steam also marks the first appearance of Theo Travis in the group replacing Elton Dean who died in February 2006 at age 60.

== Track listing ==
1. "Footloose" (8:46) (Hugh Hopper)
2. "The Steamer" (4:38) (Theo Travis)
3. "The Big Man" (5:08) (Hugh Hopper / John Etheridge / John Marshall / Theo Travis)
4. "Chloe & The Pirates" (7:27) (Mike Ratledge)
5. "In The Back Room" (7:10) (John Etheridge)
6. "The Last Day" (5:20) (Theo Travis)
7. "Firefly" (6:41) (Hugh Hopper / John Marshall)
8. "So English" (8:29) (Hugh Hopper / John Etheridge / John Marshall / Theo Travis)
9. "Dave Acto" (6:25) (Hugh Hopper / John Etheridge / John Marshall / Theo Travis)
10. "Anything to Anywhere" (5:20) (Theo Travis)

== Personnel ==
- Theo Travis – tenor sax, soprano sax, flute, loops
- John Etheridge – electric guitar
- Hugh Hopper – bass guitar, loops
- John Marshall – drums, percussion

=== Credits ===
- Recorded by Jon Hiseman, at Temple Studios, Surrey, England; 28–30 December 2006.
- Mixed and mastered by Jon Hiseman & Soft Machine Legacy, Temple Studios, Surrey, England; January 2007.
- Produced by Soft Machine Legacy.
- Executive Producer: Leonardo Pavkovic.
