= Denys Irving =

Lucifer

Background information
- Born: Denys George Irving; 4 January 1944; Colwyn Bay, Wales
- Died: 5 August 1976 (aged 32) Mill Hill, Sussex, England
- Genres: Garage rock, psychedelic rock
- Occupations: Musician, filmmaker
- Instruments: Guitar, drums, vocals, electronics
- Label: Private press

Denys George Irving (4 January 1944 – 5 August 1976), was a Welsh filmmaker and musician from Colwyn Bay, North Wales. Lucifer was his solo rock project active in the early 1970s. Irving was also a pioneer in early computer animation. Some of his work has recently been shown at the Tate Gallery, and his films are held in the LUX collection.

== Attribution of 'Lucifer' ==
Howard Marks clearly states in his autobiography Mr Nice (Secker and Warburg, 1996), that Lucifer was the solo work of Denys Irving. This admission by Marks went unnoticed for years, so the identity of Lucifer was often falsely attributed to Peter Walker of The Purple Gang, due to the fact Walker started calling himself Lucifer in the late sixties. There are also references to Lucifer and Denys (spelt Dennis) Irving in the biography Howard Marks, His Life and High Times (Unwin Hyman, 1988) by David Leigh, and the e-book Rogue Males: Richard Burton, Howard Marks and Sir Richard Burton (2010) by Rob Walters. Denys Irving is also mentioned (in relation to film making) in the book A history of artists' film and video in Britain, 1897–2004, (British Film Institute Publishing, 2006) by David Curtis. The records were only available via mail order through adverts in papers such as Oz magazine (issue numbers 41/42), Record Mirror, New Musical Express and International Times (it or IT, issue numbers 126/127 & 128).

== Early life and education ==
Denys George Irving was born on 4 January 1944 in Colwyn Bay, North Wales, and attended Dulwich College (1954–1961), where he won the Fawkes Memorial Scholarship to Balliol College, Oxford (1962) where he read Philosophy, Politics and Economics. He was a friend of Howard Marks at Oxford. After graduating in 1966, Irving went on to study at the London School of Economics, and was a graduate student in the Philosophy Ph.D. program at Columbia University, New York.

== Early audio-visual work ==
At Columbia Irving became interested in artificial intelligence and started working with computers. Using Columbia University's mainframe computer he developed programs to produce short computer-generated silent films.

He pioneered projection systems for 'psychedelic' effects, initially using liquid inks on glass slides, and later combining these with photographic images. He mounted a powerful projector in his apartment in the East Village and projected images onto the building opposite, often attracting substantial crowds.

During his stay in New York Denys recorded (as Dennis Irving) an interview with the American Jazz/Experimental composer Sun Ra for Pacifica Radio.

== Films and music ==
On his return to London in 1969, Irving continued to be interested in making films and in record production. He set up a company called Lucifer films Ltd. with Naomi Zack whom he had met at Columbia. Lucifer films developed into Lucifer recordings, and produced various records that Howard Marks described as "proto punk". Lucifer released several singles, including "Fuck You" and two LPs, "Big Gun" and "Exit" in which Irving played all the instruments and also provided the vocals.

The "Exit" LP was the soundtrack to the recently-rediscovered "motor-cycle shock film" Exit which Irving co-wrote and co-directed with Zack, and which he starred in. The film has been digitised by Barney Platts-Mills and received a belated premiere at the Portobello Pop Up Cinema on 30 September 2012. It was screened at the British Film Institute on 17 April 2015 as part of "Cinema Born Again: Radical Film from the 70s", and the original 16mm print is held in the BFI archive.

Around 1975, Irving became interested in synthesizers and, working with his friend Mike Ratledge of Soft Machine, constructed a prototype synthesizer that Ratledge used on the soundtrack to the 1977 film 'Riddles of the Sphinx' (directed by Laura Mulvey & Peter Wollen).

Two of his computer-generated films, 69 and Now, are held in the LUX collection.

=== Albums ===
- 1972: Big Gun (LLP1)
- 1972: Exit (LLP2) (Rock-electronics by Lucifer with sound-effects & dialogue from the soundtrack of the motor-cycle shock film 'Exit')
- 1990s (?): Big Gun (with Luzifer on label) Bootleg recording LP.
- 2006: Big Gun reissue on vinyl (DYNA030LP) and CD (DYNA030CD) Dynamic (Italy) a bootleg version.
- 2015: Dance With The Devil Stoned Circle (STC2CD3006) 2 CDs bootleg

=== Singles ===
- 1971: "Don't care"/"Hypnosis" (L001/L002)
- 1972: "Fuck You"/"Bad" (L003/L004) An advert in NME on 29 July 1972 claimed all copies of this single were seized by Scotland Yard
- 1972: "Pr**k"/"Want It" (L005/L006)
- 1973: "Mr Jack"/"Mr Jack" (L007)

=== Film ===
- 1971: "EXIT" by Denys Irving, Naomi Zack & Lucifer Films Ltd 83 min. (Shown at the British Film Institute on 17 April 2015 as part of 'Cinema Born Again: Radical Film from the 70s').

=== Compilations ===
- 2006: "Don't Care" appears on the unofficial CD Clinic – Mix 2006
- 2011: "Fuck You" appears on the unofficial LP Do What Thou Wilt "The Satanic Rites Of British Rock 1970 – 1974" (Limited Edition of 200).

== Personal life and death ==
Irving married Merdelle Jordine (Crossroads (playing Trina MacDonald 41 episodes, 1978–1982), 'Timeslip' (1970 as Vera), Death May Be Your Santa Claus, Riddles of the Sphinx, The Sweeney) in 1975, and they had a son.

In America, Irving had taken up hang gliding and he continued to pursue this interest in England. On the 5th August 1976 his hang glider crash-landed at Shoreham-by-Sea (or Mill Hill), Sussex, and he was fatally injured.

== Legacy ==
In 1997 Cheater Slicks included a cover version of Lucifer's "Hypnosis" on their double CD Forgive Thee (ITR 054). In 2000, John Miller released a cover version of Lucifer's "Winter" on his Preference album (Polenta LEN18, available from www.cdvine.co.uk). Venien (of the black metal groups Von & Von Venien) has recorded a tribute version of "Fuck You" entitled "FvkU!" with his new group Dirty FvKn! Pistols which will be released shortly. In 2012 the English composer Simon Rackham released the track "Lucifer's Song" (A Passacaglia in Memory of Denys Irving). Since the re-release of Big Gun by Dynamic, every mention of Lucifer seems to include the reference to it being the work of the "acid-ravaged mind of Peter 'Lucifer' Walker ex-The Purple Gang". This unfounded attribution appears to come from the Rock Encyclopedia books by Vernon Joynson, but he gives no sources for his information, and Julian Cope also makes this error in his 2006 Head Heritage Exit LP review. The Denys Irving attribution comes from Howard Marks, Mike Ratledge of Soft Machine, Naomi Zack, (who co-produced and co-directed the film 'Exit'), and Denys' brother Andrew.

== Sources ==
- Howard Marks Mr Nice (see his autobiography Mr Nice pages 38, 104, 144/145).
- David Leigh Howard Marks, His Life and High Times
