= Six (Soft Machine album) =

Studio album / Live album by Soft Machine
- Released: February 1973
- Recorded: The Dome, Brighton, and Civic Hall, Guildford, October and November 1972 (live record), CBS Studios, London, November and December 1972 (studio record, except "1983"), Advision Studios, London, 1973 ("1983")
- Genres: Jazz fusion; free jazz
- Length: 76:25
- Labels: CBS (UK), Columbia (USA)
- Producer: Soft Machine

Soft Machine chronology
| Fifth (1972) | Six (1973) | Seven (1973) |

Professional ratings
Review scores
| Source | Rating |
|---|---|
| AllMusic | 3/5 stars |
| Christgau's Record Guide | B− |

Six is the sixth studio album by the jazz rock band Soft Machine. Originally released in 1973 as a double LP, the first disc is a live album and the second disc is a studio album. This is the first album to feature Karl Jenkins as a member the group, replacing Elton Dean. Jenkins eventually became the de facto leader and main composer of the group. It was also the last Soft Machine album to feature Hugh Hopper on bass.

== Overview ==
The previous two albums had been issued with slightly different titles in different countries (Fourth and Fifth in the UK, Four and 5 in the USA, with the former album showing a numeral 4 on the cover, while the album before that had been titled Third worldwide). On this album, they deferred to their American standard for worldwide release.

The album includes a live record and a studio record, individually titled as shown in the track listing below.

== Track listing ==
=== Soft Machine "Six" Album – Live Record ===
Side one
| No. | Title | Writer(s) | Length |
|---|---|---|---|
| 1. | "Fanfare" | Karl Jenkins | 0:42 |
| 2. | "All White" | Mike Ratledge | 4:46 |
| 3. | "Between" | Jenkins, Ratledge | 2:24 |
| 4. | "Riff I" | Jenkins | 4:36 |
| 5. | "37½" | Ratledge | 6:51 |
| Total length: | | | 19:19 |

Side two
| No. | Title | Writer(s) | Length |
|---|---|---|---|
| 6. | "Gesolreut" | Ratledge | 6:17 |
| 7. | "E.P.V." | Jenkins | 2:47 |
| 8. | "Lefty" | Soft Machine | 4:56 |
| 9. | "Stumble" | Jenkins | 1:42 |
| 10. | "5 from 13 (for Phil Seamen with Love & Thanks)" | John Marshall | 5:15 |
| 11. | "Riff II" | Jenkins | 1:20 |
| Total length: | | | 21:37 40:16 |

Note: "Lefty" composer credit changed to (Hopper / Jenkins / Marshall) on later CD editions.

=== Soft Machine "Six" Album – Studio Record ===
Side one
| No. | Title | Writer(s) | Length |
|---|---|---|---|
| 1. | "The Soft Weed Factor" | Jenkins | 11:18 |
| 2. | "Stanley Stamp's Gibbon Album (for B.O.)" | Ratledge | 5:58 |
| Total length: | | | 17:16 |

Side two
| No. | Title | Writer(s) | Length |
|---|---|---|---|
| 3. | "Chloe and the Pirates" | Ratledge | 9:30 |
| 4. | "1983" | Hugh Hopper | 7:54 |
| Total length: | | | 17:24 34:40 |

== Personnel ==
Soft Machine

- Karl Jenkins – oboe, baritone and soprano saxophones, electric piano and grand piano, celeste
- Mike Ratledge – organ, electric and grand piano, celeste
- Hugh Hopper – bass guitar; sound effects on "1983"
- John Marshall – drums, percussion

Record 1: Recorded at the Brighton Dome and at the Guildford Civic Hall and mixed at Advision Studios, London during the months of October and November 1972.

Record 2: "1983" recorded and mixed at Advision Studios, London. All other compositions recorded and mixed at CBS Studios, London during the months of November and December 1972.
