= Canterburied Sounds =

Compilation album by various
- Released: January 1998
- Genre: Canterbury scene
- Length: 4:53:35
- Label: Voiceprint Records (VP201-204)

Canterburied Sounds is a series of four CDs of archival Canterbury scene recordings compiled from the private collection of Brian Hopper. The set includes some of the earliest-known recordings of Caravan, Soft Machine, Robert Wyatt, and Wilde Flowers.

== Editions ==
The first edition in 1998 was released as four separate CDs. In 2013 Voiceprint reissued the four discs in a single boxed set.

== Cover ==
The cover watercolor painting of Canterbury Cathedral is by Leslie Hopper, father of Brian and Hugh Hopper. Other watercolors by Leslie Hopper have been featured on Hugh Hopper’s official website. In 1978 Hugh and his father published a book of his church paintings.

== Tracks ==
The notes are excerpted from extensive comments on each track by Brian Hopper.

=== Volume 1: Canterburied Sounds ===
Track	Title	Artist	Composer	Notes	Recording Date	Length
1	Feelin’, Reelin’, Squealin’	Caravan	Kevin Ayers	"Recorded live at The Foundry in Jewry Lane, Canterbury immediately following the Caravan's second LP"	1969	10:19
2	Mummie	Robert Wyatt & Brian Hopper	Robert Wyatt & Brian Hopper	"An improvised duet of guitar & vocals, switching speeds on the tape recorder whilst recording"	late 1962/early 1963	4:31
3	Da-Da-Dee/Bolivar Blues	Mike Ratledge & Robert Wyatt	unknown/Thelonious Monk	“piano & drums duet with some argument on the choice of key”	early 1963	11:56
4	Orientasian	Brian Hopper & Robert Wyatt	Brian Hopper	"duet for my newly-acquired soprano sax and Robert Wyatt on electric guitar"	1967/68	4:03
5	You Really Got Me	Wilde Flowers	Ray Davies	"Early rehearsal of Wilde Flowers with probably the first-ever recording of Kevin Ayers singing"	summer 1964	3:53
6	Thinking of You Baby	Wilde Flowers	Dave Clark	"We had to learn a repertoire of current, popular songs to get local gigs"	summer 1964	5:20
7	Man in a Deaf Corner	Brian Hopper, Hugh Hopper, Mike Ratledge, & Robert Wyatt	Brian Hopper, Hugh Hopper, Mike Ratledge, & Robert Wyatt	"Part of a long and spontaneous improvisation, with Mike showing a heavy Cecil Taylor influence"	late 1962/early 1963	5:05
8	If I Ever Leave You	Zobe	cover of "I Love You More Than You'll Ever Know" by Al Kooper	“From a live performance by my late sixties/early seventies band Zobe”	1970	6:15
9	Stop Me & Play One	Robert Wyatt & unknown guitarist	unknown	“No-one seems to be able to recall the name of the quirky guitarist — there were SO MANY musicians passing through”	1963/1964	3:45
10	Piano Standards 1	Mike Ratledge	various	“Few people will have heard Mike play like this, but it does show the all-round musical experience that Mike had absorbed”	1964	3:36
11	Belsize Parked	Brian Hopper, Hugh Hopper, & Robert Wyatt	Brian Hopper, Hugh Hopper, & Robert Wyatt	“Wellington House provided the opportunity for us to ‘blow’ for hours and develop a rare musical intimacy”	late 1963/early 1964	9:19
12	Summertime	Caravan	George Gershwin & Ira Gershwin	“Another ‘live at the Foundry’ gig with a number that was an early Caravan showcase”	1969	7:16

=== Volume 2: All Roads Lead Back to Canterbury ===
Track	Title	Artist	Composer	Notes	Recording Date	Length
1	Carazobe	Caravan & Zobe	John Larner, Pye Hastings & Brian Hopper	"Pye suggested several members of Zobe join in on an extended blow during a joint gig in East Kent"	1970	16:19
2	Instant Pussy	Robert Wyatt	Robert Wyatt	“Robert described this as his answer to Leonard Cohen!"	1969	3:16
3	Esther’s Nose Job	Soft Machine	Mike Ratledge	"Demo tape provided to me so I could work out the sax lines for Volume Two"	January 1969	9:33
4	Moorish	Robert Wyatt & Brian Hopper	Robert Wyatt & Brian Hopper	"A semi-improvised piece with an Iberian feel, with Robert switching between piano, cornet and finally guitar"	late 1962/early 1963	8:33
5	Summertime	Mike Ratledge & Robert Wyatt	George Gershwin & Ira Gershwin	"Another of several versions in my archive tapes"	early 1963	4:24
6	Indian Rope Man	Zobe	Richie Havens	"The band had to rehearse a selection of covers to provide sufficient variety for live gigs — which were few and far between"	1970	4:36
7	Drum Solo	Robert Wyatt	Robert Wyatt	"Robert working out some interesting drum patterns — even at this comparatively early stage his drumming technique was impressive"	probably 1963	1:39
8	Mirror For The Day	Pye Hastings	Pye Hastings	“Pye working out the orchestral string arrangements for Mirror For The Day”	1973	1:26
9	Love Song with Cello	Robert Wyatt plus others	Robert Wyatt	“Robert showing his seemingly endless versatility with an excursion on cello coupled with vocalisations”	1963/1964	4:18
10	As I Feel I Die	Caravan	Pye Hastings, Dave Sinclair, Richard Sinclair, & Richard Coughlan	“Another track from the Foundry gig in Canterbury”	1969	4:45
11	Where But For Caravan Would I	Caravan	Brian Hopper & Pye Hastings	“A song adapted from one of my early compositions entitled How Many Tears”	1969	11:59

=== Volume 3: A Kinship of Sounds ===
Track	Title	Artist	Composer	Notes	Recording Date	Length
1	Slow Walkin’ Talk	Robert Wyatt & Jimi Hendrix	Brian Hopper	“Robert was laying down demo tracks of organ, drum and vocal when Jimi wandering in and suggested doing the bass on Noel’s bass”	October 1968	3:02
2	Frenetica	Mike Ratledge & Robert Wyatt	Mike Ratledge & Robert Wyatt	“A largely improvised piece in which Robert supplies plenty of drive”	1963/1964	4:21
3	Idle Chat	Mike Ratledge & Robert Wyatt	n.a.	“The tape remained running while Robert expounded enthusiastically about the style of the drummer of Peter Jay & the Jaywalkers, a popular group of the sixties”	1963/1964	1:32
4	3/4 Blues Thing in F	Mike Ratledge & Robert Wyatt	Mike Ratledge & Robert Wyatt	“This is the number resulting from the previous deliberation”	1963/1964	4:17
5	More Idle Chat	Zobe	n.a.	“Another time when the tape was left running”	summer 1970	3:48
6	The Pieman Cometh	Zobe	Brian Hopper	“Written at the end of the Wilde Flowers era, although never performed by them”	summer 1970	6:02
7	Liu-Ba	Robert Wyatt, Brian Hopper, Hugh Hopper plus unknown guitarist	Brian Hopper, Hugh Hopper & Robert Wyatt	“Another session with the unknown guitarist, although there are suggestions it could be Daevid Allen”	1963	8:36
8	Kansas City/Rip It Up	Brian Hopper, Hugh Hopper & Pete Lawson	Jerry Leiber and Mike Stoller/Richard Penniman	“These represent the earliest recordings on Canterburied Sounds — Hugh had only just purchased his first bass”	1962	2:25
9	That’s Alright Mama	Brian Hopper & Hugh Hopper	Arthur Crudup	“This is about the only recording of just Hugh and myself playing and singing together”	1962	2:13
10	Tanglewood Tails	Brian Hopper, Hugh Hopper & Robert Wyatt	Brian Hopper, Hugh Hopper & Robert Wyatt	“One of the more musically successful trio encounters — Robert is the drummer I always have a memory of”	1963	16:02
11	The Big Show/Central Park West/Songs	Zobe	Brian Hopper/John Coltrane/Brian Hopper	“Another rehearsal track, unfortunately one of the last made by the band”	1970	16:43
12	If I Could Do It All Over Again I’d Do It All Over You	Caravan	Pye Hastings, Richard Coughlan, Dave Sinclair & Richard Sinclair	“Yet another track from the Foundry gig, probably their most well-known number”	1969	4:09

=== Volume 4: Canterbury Pre-Soft, Pre-Wild ===
Track	Title	Artist	Composer	Notes	Recording Date	Length
1	Slow Walkin’ Talk	Zobe	Brian Hopper	“Another version from a Zobe rehearsal”	1970	5:43
2	Some-of-the-Time	Mike Ratledge, Brian Hopper, Robert Wyatt & unknown guitarist	Mike Ratledge, Brian Hopper & Robert Wyatt	“Thinly-veiled variations on Gershwin’s Summertime (again!)”	1963/1964	14:45
3	Ghosts	Robert Wyatt, Mike Ratledge & unknown guitarist	Albert Ayler	“More wild flourish from Mike in the Cecil Taylor mould”	1963/1964	5:23
4	With an Ear to the Ground You Can Make It	Caravan	Pye Hastings, Richard Coughlan, Dave Sinclair & Richard Sinclair	“Because they have not had sufficient time to rehearse it we are treated to a unique arrangement”	1969	8:48
5	Dalmore Rode	Brian Hopper & Robert Wyatt	Brian Hopper & Robert Wyatt	“Robert is heard extending even further the sonic capabilities of the cello”	1963/1964	7:56
6	Piano Standards 2	Mike Ratledge	various	“Opening with a few Thelonious Monk tinged phrases, this is the second selection of piano standards”	1964	3:13
7	Johnny B. Goode	Wilde Flowers	Chuck Berry	“We leaned heavily on the Chuck Berry catalogue to boost our early repertoire”	1964	3:10
8	Cecilian	Brian Hopper, Hugh Hopper, Mike Ratledge & Robert Wyatt	Brian Hopper, Hugh Hopper, Mike Ratledge & Robert Wyatt	“Mike in his most intense Cecil Taylor style, with Hugh in his first recorded bass solo!”	late 1962	12:00
9	Austin Cambridge	Caravan	Derek Austin	“The first recorded example of Geoff Richardson on viola”	late 1972	13:45
