= Brainville (band) =

English avant-garde supergroup

- Genres: Canterbury sound
- Years active: 1998–2006
- Labels: Shimmy Disc
- Past members: Daevid Allen; Hugh Hopper; Pip Pyle; Kramer; Chris Cutler
- Website: http://www.rermegacorp.com/

Brainville were an English avant-garde supergroup fronted by Hugh Hopper (bass) and Daevid Allen (guitar), both previously in Soft Machine.

The band started as a quartet with Pip Pyle (drums) and Kramer (bass, producer). They performed two concerts in one evening at NYC's Knitting Factory in 1998, and days later went into Kramer's Noise New Jersey studio and recorded The Children's Crusade, released the following year on Kramer's Shimmy-Disc label. Reduced to a trio, Brainville: Live in the UK, released as by "Daevid Allen with Hugh Hopper and Pip Pyle", was issued in 2004.

The band, Allen, Hopper and Chris Cutler (drums) operating as the Brainville 3, played shows in 2005–2008. They released a live album, Trial by Headline in 2008.

This line-up played at the Canterbury Festival in October 2006.

== Discography ==
Brainville

- The Children's Crusade (1999, CD, Shimmy Disc, U.S.)

Brainville 3

- Trial by Headline (2008, CD, Recommended Records, U.K.)
