= Freedom Is Frightening =

Studio album by Stomu Yamashta's East Wind
- Released: 1973
- Label: Island; Esoteric (rerelease)

Professional ratings
Review scores
Source	Rating
AllMusic	3.5/5 stars
The Encyclopedia of Popular Music	3/5 stars

Freedom Is Frightening is a 1973 album by the Japanese percussionist, keyboardist and composer Stomu Yamash'ta and his band East Wind. It was recorded in August 1973 at Advision Studios (Gary Martin, engineer).

The cover art was designed by Saul Bass.

== Critical reception ==
AllMusic called the title track "a master class in atmosphere and tension building, slowly expanding from the early long, sparse, foreboding electronica into progressive pyrotechnics."

== Track listing ==
=== Side One ===
1. "Freedom Is Frightening"
2. "Rolling Nun"

=== Side Two ===
1. "Pine On The Horizon"
2. "Wind Words"

== Personnel ==
- Stomu Yamash'ta, Kit & Percussion
- Hisako Yamash'ta, Violin
- Hugh Hopper, Bass Guitar
- Gary Boyle, Electric & Acoustic Guitars
- Brian Gascoigne, Keyboards, Synthesizers, Vibraphone

== See also ==
- The Man Who Fell To Earth (The movie includes tracks from Freedom is Frightening and other Yamash'ta albums.)
