= Brian Hopper =

English guitarist and saxophonist

- Hopper in 1966

Background information
- Born: 3 January 1943 (age 83); Whitstable, Kent, England
- Origin: Canterbury, England
- Genre: Progressive rock
- Instruments: Saxophone, guitar, vocals
- Years active: 1966–1970s, 1990s–present
- Formerly of: The Wilde Flowers, Soft Machine

Brian Hopper (born 3 January 1943) is an English guitarist and saxophonist. He is the older brother of the late bassist Hugh Hopper.

== Career ==
=== The Wilde Flowers and Soft Machine ===
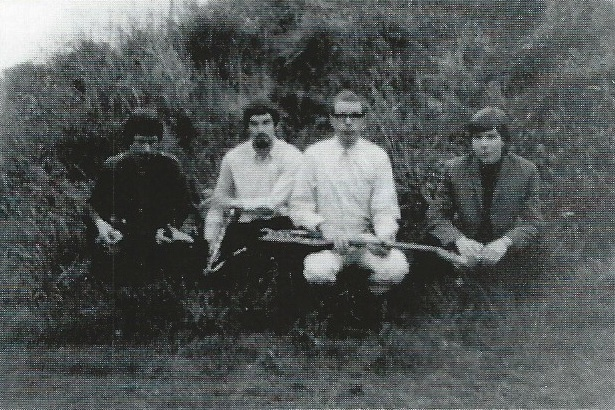
Brian Hopper (second from left) as part of The Wilde Flowers in 1966

With his brother Hugh, he was a member in the early Canterbury scene band Wilde Flowers, and was the only constant member throughout its three year run. In 1968, he recorded several tracks with Dave Lawrence, John Lawrence and Dave Smith under the name Zobe, which were eventually released on CD featuring Wilde Flowers recordings in 1995.

He co-wrote several tracks on Soft Machine's 1968 debut album, with Hugh, who was a member of Soft Machine from 1968 to 1973. After guesting on saxophone during the sessions for the follow-up album Volume Two in early 1969, he joined Soft Machine full-time for five months from May to October 1969.

=== Beggar's Farm ===
In 1969, Hopper formed Beggar's Farm with John Lawrence (guitar) and Dave Smith (drums), John Tilley (lead vocals and flute) and Dave Holman (bass). Beggar's Farm was short-lived, as the band quickly disbanded in May 1970, when Tilley was killed in a road accident.

=== Agriculture ===
The deaths of other close musician friends, and Hopper feeling disillusioned with the music scene, discouraged him from pursuing a proper career in music, so he went into agricultural crop protection research and development instead. During Hopper's career in agriculture, he travelled Africa, Central America and Far East, and lived in China for two years.

=== Canterburied Sounds ===
Only in the latter part of the 1990s, did Hopper re-emerge as an artist of contemporary as well as historical significance. One of his projects was Canterburied Sounds, a four-CD compilation of archival Canterbury scene recordings from his private collection, which dated from as early as 1962 to 1970. Featured on these recordings are both Brian and Hugh Hopper, Robert Wyatt, Mike Ratledge, Jimi Hendrix, and Pete Lawson, as well as recordings by Wilde Flowers and Caravan, which some of the musicians previously credited played in.

=== Recent works ===
Recordings made in 1969 by Beggar's Farm were eventually released in 1997 as "Brian Hopper with Beggar's Farm". Hopper still performs as both a solo artist and band member. As of 2007, he was a member of Hopper & Fenner, The Happy Accidents, and Jazzmatazz. He released three solo albums under Voiceprint records between 2003 and 2006, two of which were a collaboration with Robert Fenner.

== Discography ==
Year	Title	Artist
1968	The Soft Machine	Soft Machine
1969	Volume Two	Soft Machine
1994	The Wilde Flowers	The Wilde Flowers (originally recorded between 1965–1966)
1997	Brian Hopper with Beggar's Farm	Brian Hopper with Beggar's Farm
1998	Canterburied Sounds (volumes 1 to 4, released 1998)	Various Artists
2003	Virtuality	Brian Hopper (with Robert Fenner)
2004	If Ever I Am	Brian Hopper
2006	Just Desserts	Brian Hopper & Robert Fenner

== Filmography ==
- 2015: Romantic Warriors III: Canterbury Tales (DVD)
