= Third (Soft Machine album) =

Studio album by Soft Machine
- Released: June 1970
- Recorded: live on 4 and 11 January 1970 in Croydon & Birmingham ("Facelift"); studio in April–May 1970
- Studios: IBC, London
- Genres: Jazz rock; progressive rock; electronic
- Length: 75:15
- Labels: CBS (UK), Columbia (USA)
- Producer: Soft Machine

Soft Machine chronology
Volume Two (1969)	Third (1970)	Fourth (1971)

Third is the third studio album by the English rock band Soft Machine, released in June 1970 by CBS Records in the United Kingdom and Columbia Records in the United States. The album was recorded from January to May 1970, partially at IBC Studios, based in London, and was produced by the band themselves. It is a double album with a single composition on each of the four sides, and was the first of two albums recorded with a four-piece line-up of keyboardist Mike Ratledge, drummer and vocalist Robert Wyatt, saxophonist Elton Dean, and bass guitarist Hugh Hopper. Musically, Third marks a shift in the group's sound from their psychedelic origins towards jazz rock and electronic music.

"Facelift" is a live recording by the previous line-up of the band, a five-piece with Lyn Dobson on saxophone and flute alongside Ratledge, Wyatt, Hopper and Dean. The remaining tracks are studio recordings by the four-piece line-up, augmented by a few session musicians. Jimmy Hastings (brother of Pye Hastings from Caravan) makes substantial contributions on flute and clarinet on "Slightly All the Time", free-jazz violinist Rab Spall (then a bandmate of Wyatt's in the part-time ensemble Amazing Band) is heard on the coda to "Moon in June", and Nick Evans (who had been a member of Soft Machine during late 1969 when they spent a short time as a seven-piece band) makes brief appearances on trombone in "Slightly All the Time" and "Out-Bloody-Rageous".

Upon its release, the album was positively received by music critics, mainly for its instrumentation and sound. Commercially, it charted at number 18 on the UK Albums Chart, becoming their highest-charting album to date. It also peaked at number 5 on the Dutch Album Top 100. In 2007, the album was reissued with the live album Live at the Proms 1970 as a bonus disc.

== Songs ==
The original release of Third had an unpolished sound quality, including tape hiss on the live recordings and abrupt editing. "Slightly All the Time" and "Out-Bloody-Rageous" are the most straightforward tracks on the album, representing the jazz-rock sound that would be explored further on subsequent albums.

=== Sides A and B ===
"Facelift" was recorded live at the Fairfield Halls, Croydon, 4 January 1970 (Soft Machine's first gig of the 1970s and the first with the Ratledge/Wyatt/Hopper/Dean/Dobson line-up), with a brief section from the Mothers Club, Birmingham, 11 January 1970, and some recordings from the 1969 Spaced project. While a large part of the finished product is essentially a live recording, parts involve tape collage and speeding up, slowing down, looping and backwards-playing of tapes. In the ending section, two different treatments of the same basic riff (one from the live concert, the other, at double speed, from Spaced) are heard backwards simultaneously. At the time of the five-piece line-up, "Facelift" was typically expanded with solo improvisations and showcases by Lyn Dobson on flute, vocals and harmonica.

"Slightly All the Time" is a medley of different instrumental pieces, including Ratledge's "Backwards" and Hopper's "Noisette". "Backwards" later appeared on fellow Canterbury Scene band Caravan's 1973 album For Girls Who Grow Plump in the Night, as part of the "A-Hunting We Shall Go" medley.

=== Sides C and D ===
"Moon in June" is the last song with lyrics that Soft Machine recorded, and their last look back to their progressive rock, pre-jazz sound. The song is in three parts. The first is a pastiche of vocal themes delivered in a stream of consciousness which varied in live performances. Wyatt plays all the instruments in this section. The lyrics borrow from Soft Machine's earlier "That's How Much I Need You Now" and "You Don't Remember", but largely from new vignettes recorded in a demo by Wyatt in October 1968 while on holiday in New York state. An excerpt from a different demo of Part 1, recorded in November 1968, was included on Robert Wyatt's 2001 Flotsam Jetsam archive compilation. The second part features the whole band, and is an instrumental similar to other jazz-rock pieces on the album.

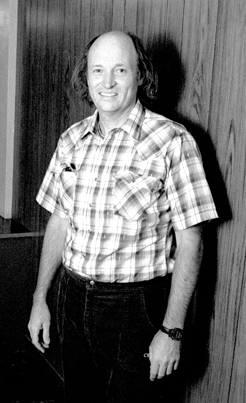
The tape loops on "Out-Bloody-Rageous" were inspired by Terry Riley

The third is a drone featuring Wyatt and violinist Rab Spall; Spall's part was recorded separately and was sped up and slowed down to make the violin fit the beats of the music. This section also features Wyatt scat singing uncredited renditions of two Kevin Ayers songs: "Singing a Song in the Morning" and "Hat Song". A demo of the second and third parts was recorded in Spring 1969, which was spliced onto the October 1968 demo to be included on Soft Machine's 2002 Backwards archival release. A live recording from 24 May 1970 in London was released on Backwards, containing a shortened version of parts 2 and 3. A pre-Third performance that includes a shortened instrumental Part 1 was recorded live at the Fairfield Halls concert and appears on Soft Machine's 2000 Noisette archive release.

"Out-Bloody-Rageous" is an instrumental composed by Ratledge, with sections featuring repetitive multi-tracked electric piano parts, in a style inspired by the work of Terry Riley. Its name inspired the names of the 2005 Soft Machine biography Soft Machine: Out-Bloody-Rageous, and a 2-CD anthology from 2005 entitled Out-Bloody-Rageous An Anthology 1967–1973.

== Reception ==
Professional ratings
Review scores
Source	Rating
AllMusic	5/5 stars
Christgau's Record Guide	B
Encyclopedia of Popular Music	4/5 stars

Third was released in June 1970 and became the band's first and highest charting album, peaking at No. 18 on the UK Albums Chart. It also peaked at number 5 on the Dutch Album Top 100 in the Netherlands. According to Paul Stump's The Music's All that Matters: A History of Progressive Rock, Third was "unanimously acclaimed as the band's zenith." A retrospective review in Allmusic praised the exotic instrumentation and fusion of genres, and concluded, "Not exactly rock, Third nonetheless pushed the boundaries of rock into areas previously unexplored, and it managed to do so without sounding self-indulgent. A better introduction to the group is either of the first two records, but once introduced, this is the place to go." In the Q & Mojo Classic Special Edition Pink Floyd & The Story of Prog Rock (2005), the album came #20 in its list of "40 Cosmic Rock Albums".

== Reissues ==
In 2007, the album was re-issued on CD by Sony BMG with a second disc comprising a complete live album, Live at the Proms 1970, which had been previously released by a small independent company called Reckless Records in 1988. This album was recorded at The BBC Proms in the Royal Albert Hall on 13 August 1970. The band's performance, in the second half, following the BBC Symphony Orchestra in the first, marked the first time that a popular-music band played at the classical festival. The disparity of Soft Machine's concert as compared to the hall's usual fare is explained by Robert Wyatt on the Reckless album's liner notes:

We was invited by Tim Souster, who had an evening using the hall to do what he liked with. I believe he'd heard our second LP, asked us on the strength of that. He discovered us on the way to discovering Motown. Via the Who, I think. Anyway it was brave of him to invite us despite the withering contempt of the posh music establishment. Before our bit, I went out the back for a quick fag and then the doorman didn't want to let me back in. "I've got to play in there", I said. "You must be kidding, son", he said, "they only have proper music in there". Not that night they didn't.

Robert Wyatt, album liner notes

"Esther's Nose Job" on the bonus disc originally appeared on Volume Two, and no longer includes its cacophonous introduction "Fire Engine Passing with Bells Clanging", but adds a new section, "Pigling Bland", which appeared as a track on its own on the group's Fifth album a few years later. This version does not contain the lyrics found in the original, but it does include some scat singing from Wyatt. All three pieces on the bonus disc are performed as one continuous suite. (The original vinyl edition of Live at the Proms 1970 had a fade-out and fade-in of the drum solo connecting the second and third pieces, as was necessary for a two-sided LP.)

Both discs were re-mastered for the re-issue, improving the sound quality significantly.

== Track listing ==
Side A
No.	Title	Writer(s)	Length
1.	"Facelift"	Hugh Hopper	18:45

Side B
No.	Title	Writer(s)	Length
2.	"Slightly All the Time"	Mike Ratledge; Hopper	18:12
Total length:			36:57

Side C
No.	Title	Writer(s)	Length
3.	"Moon in June"	Robert Wyatt	19:08

Side D
No.	Title	Writer(s)	Length
4.	"Out-Bloody-Rageous"	Ratledge	19:10
Total length:			38:18

Bonus disc from 2007 CD re-issue
No.	Title	Writer(s)	Length
5.	"Out-Bloody-Rageous"	Ratledge	11:54
6.	"Facelift"	Hopper	11:22
7.	"Esther's Nose Job" (including "Pig", "Orange Skin Food", "A Door Opens and Closes", "Pigling Bland" and "10:30 Returns to the Bedroom")	Ratledge; Hopper; Wyatt	15:39

== Personnel ==
Soft Machine

- Elton Dean – alto saxophone, saxello (all but 3)
- Mike Ratledge – Hohner Pianet, Lowrey organ, piano, Hammond organ (2)
- Hugh Hopper – bass guitar
- Robert Wyatt – drums, vocals (3), plus on 3 (uncredited): Hammond organ, Mellotron, Hohner Pianet, piano, bass

Additional personnel

- Lyn Dobson – flute, soprano saxophone (1)
- Jimmy Hastings – flute, bass clarinet (2, 4)
- Nick Evans – trombone (2, 4)
- Rab Spall – violin (3)

== Charts ==
Chart (1970)	Peak position
UK Albums (OCC)	18
Dutch Album Top 100	5
