= Soft Heap (band) =

Soft Heap / Soft Head
- Origin: Soft Machine (Canterbury, England)
- Genres: Canterbury scene; jazz rock; progressive rock
- Years active: 1978–1988
- Labels: Ogun Records, Charly Records, Impetus Records, Reel Recordings, Neon Records

Soft Heap (or Soft Head) was a Canterbury scene and jazz rock supergroup founded in January 1978 and active throughout the Eighties.

== History ==
Main source:

=== Origins ===
Jazz-rock band Soft Heap was formed in January 1978 by four musicians, two of them being ex-members of Soft Machine: indeed, Hugh Hopper and Elton Dean had worked together in Soft Machine, while Alan Gowen and Pip Pyle had worked together in the band National Health.

The first name "Soft" obviously references the past band Soft Machine while the second name "Heap" comes from the initial letters of the band's founders' first name: Hugh Hopper (bass), Elton Dean (saxophone), Alan Gowen (keyboards) and Pip Pyle (drums).

=== Career ===
The band's direction was very jazzy and improvisational.

Soft Heap went on tour in Spring–Summer 1978, but due to his commitments with the band National Health, Pyle couldn't be on this first tour, thus Dave Sheen replaced him and the band's name changed to Soft Head.

The live album Rogue Element was recorded on that tour in May 1978 at Chez Jacky "A L'Ouest de la Grosne" Bresse-sur-Grosne, France and was released in 1978.

The original Soft Heap line-up reconvened in October 1978 (thus including Pip Pyle) to record their eponymous studio album Soft Heap which was released in 1979.

John Greaves (also from National Health) replaced Hugh Hopper on bass in 1979–80, and after Alan Gowen's death in 1981, Mark Hewins joined on guitar, the new 1981 line-up becoming: John Greaves, Elton Dean, Pip Pyle and Mark Hewins. (The three other founding members Hugh Hopper, Elton Dean and Pip Pyle would all die in the 2000s).

As Mark Hewins explained: "John Greaves and I were given the opportunity to change the name of the group when we joined, but we all decided that, in respect of Alan Gowen's memory, we would keep the "Heap" moniker (Hugh, Elton, Alan, Pip)... [Otherwise,] it could have been... "Soft Jemp"!".

The new line-up toured intermittently throughout the 1980s, occasionally including guests such as Fred Frith and Phil Minton.

Released only in 1996, A Veritable Centaur is a live album largely taken from a 1982 French show, with one track from a 1983 BBC Radio 3 performance while Al Dente is a 2008 archival release of the show at the Phoenix Club, London, on 22 November 1978.

No records were released during the 1980s although the band kept gigging, embarking on four tours during the decade with a total of 25 European concerts, culminating with a gig in a circus tent (built especially for the band) on 11 May 1988 at the Festival "Jazz sous les pommiers" in Coutances, France that was recorded and broadcast live by FR1 Radio (according to Mark Hewins).

== Personnel ==
Main source:

=== Members ===
==== 1978–1979 ====
- Hugh Hopper (bass)
- Elton Dean (saxophone)
- Alan Gowen (keyboards)
- Pip Pyle (drums) / Dave Sheen (the latter only during the Spring–Summer 1978 tour)

==== 1979–1980 ====
- John Greaves (bass, vocals)
- Elton Dean (saxophone)
- Alan Gowen (keyboards)
- Pip Pyle (drums)

==== 1981–1988 ====
- John Greaves (bass, organ, vocals)
- Elton Dean (saxophone)
- Mark Hewins (guitar, vocals)
- Pip Pyle (drums)

=== Occasional guest musicians through the 1980s ===
- Fred Frith (guitar, bass, keyboards...)
- Phil Minton (trumpet)

== Discography ==
Year of release	Band	Album
1978	Soft Head	Rogue Element (Note: Live album (Ogun Records).)
1979	Soft Heap	Soft Heap (Note: Studio album (Charly Records).)
1996	Soft Heap	A Veritable Centaur (1982–1983) (Note: Live album (Impetus Records), largely taken from a 1982 French show, with one track from a 1983 BBC Radio 3 performance.)
2008	Soft Heap	Al Dente (1978) (Note: Live album (Reel Recordings); archival release of a 1978 show.)
