= Volume Two (The Soft Machine album) =

- International cover

Studio album by Soft Machine
- Released: September 1969
- Recorded: February–March 1969
- Studios: Olympic Studios, London
- Genres: Canterbury scene, progressive rock, jazz rock
- Length: 33:20
- Labels: Probe SPB 1002 (UK); CPLP-4505 (US)
- Producer: The Soft Machine

Soft Machine chronology
| The Soft Machine (1968) | Volume Two (1969) | Third (1970) |

Volume Two is the second album by the British band Soft Machine, released in September 1969, through Probe Records. It was Soft Machine's first album release in the UK.

Recording sessions ran from February to March 1969 at Olympic Studios in London, produced by the band themselves. The album combined humour, dada, psychedelia, progressive rock, and jazz rock. Upon its release, the album peaked at number 2 on the Dutch Album Top 100, and was positively received by music critics. In 2000, it was voted number 715 in Colin Larkin's All Time Top 1000 Albums.

== Background and composition ==
The Soft Machine had split up in September 1968 but reunited that December without bassist/singer Kevin Ayers in order to fulfill contractual obligations. Their road manager Hugh Hopper took Ayers' place on bass and a second album (the first released in their home country UK) was recorded in early 1969. The group's sound had been radically altered from the first album, pushing much further in a complex prog and jazz-fusion direction with Hugh's brother Brian Hopper guesting on soprano and tenor saxophones; after guesting on the album, Brian Hopper joined Soft Machine as a fourth member for a few months later in 1969. Multi-sectional suites like "Rivmic Melodies" and "Esther's Nose Job" rely on complex time signatures, Dadaist humour, short spoken word interludes, and Robert Wyatt's idiosyncratic vocals which were often put through heavy echo delay. By contrast, "Dedicated To You But You Weren't Listening" is a brief melodic tune performed on an acoustic guitar.

In the lyrics to "Have You Ever Bean Green?" Soft Machine reference the Jimi Hendrix Experience, with whom they had toured the United States in the spring of 1968; as Hendrix's opening band they were exposed to large crowds for the first time. The title of the song is a play on the chorus in the Hendrix song "Are You Experienced?", which asks "Have you ever been experienced?". Wyatt thanks "Brian" (Brian Hopper) and "George" (engineer George Chkiantz) in the next section, "Pataphysical Introduction – Pt. 2", which also includes a quote of "These Foolish Things". The title of the side two suite, "Esther's Nose Job", is derived from a chapter in Thomas Pynchon's novel V.

=== Artwork and packaging ===
The outer sleeve featured an abstract collage of a girl with electronic wires and reels in place of a torso. The US version of the album featured a gatefold with expanded liner notes and a black and white photo of the group, whereas the UK version dispensed with the gatefold and featured a different photo on the rear. A passage in the US liner notes (uncredited) states "There is music for the body and music for the mind...The Soft Machine plays music for the mind."

== Critical reception ==
Professional ratings
Review scores
| Source | Rating |
|---|---|
| AllMusic | 4.5/5 stars |
| Encyclopedia of Popular Music | 4/5 stars |

Melody Maker gave the album a strong review upon release, calling it "little short of brilliant for much of its length", noting that "they are capable of handling a 7/4 time signature so well that you don't notice it's 7/4". A feature for Record Mirror noted that the band's influences ranged from Ornette Coleman, Don Ellis, Paul Hindemith, and Béla Bartok, along with electronic sounds. Mike Ratledge stated "we're aiming for more complicated ideas whereby the structure changes throughout a piece".

== Track listing ==
=== Side 1 ===
| No. | Title | Writer(s) | Length |
|---|---|---|---|
| 1. | "Rivmic Melodies": 1. "Pataphysical Introduction – Pt. 1"; 2. "A Concise British Alphabet – Pt. 1"; 3. "Hibou, Anemone and Bear"; 4. "A Concise British Alphabet – Pt. 2"; 5. "Hulloder"; 6. "Dada Was Here"; 7. "Thank You Pierrot Lunaire"; 8. "Have You Ever Bean Green?"; 9. "Pataphysical Introduction – Pt. 2"; 10. "Out of Tunes" | Ratledge, Hopper, Wyatt Robert Wyatt Hugh Hopper, arr. Wyatt Mike Ratledge, Wyatt Hopper, arr. Wyatt Hopper, arr. Wyatt Hopper, arr. Wyatt Hopper, arr. Wyatt Hopper, arr. Wyatt Wyatt Ratledge, Hopper, Wyatt | 17:07 1:00 0:10 5:58 0:12 0:52 3:25 0:47 1:23 0:50 2:30 |

=== Side 2 ===
| No. | Title | Writer(s) | Length |
|---|---|---|---|
| 1. | "Esther's Nose Job": 1. "As Long as He Lies Perfectly Still"; 2. "Dedicated to You But You Weren't Listening"; 3. "Fire Engine Passing with Bells Clanging"; 4. "Pig"; 5. "Orange Skin Food"; 6. "A Door Opens and Closes"; 7. "10:30 Returns to the Bedroom" | Ratledge, Hopper, Wyatt Ratledge, Wyatt Hopper Ratledge Ratledge Ratledge Ratledge Ratledge, Hopper, Wyatt | 16:13 2:30 2:30 1:50 2:08 1:52 1:09 4:14 |

== Personnel ==
Soft Machine

- Mike Ratledge – piano, Lowrey Holiday De Luxe organ; Hammond organ (on 3); harpsichord (on 12); flute (on 3 and 10)
- Hugh Hopper – bass guitar; acoustic guitar (on 12); alto saxophone (on 3 and 14–16)
- Robert Wyatt – drums, lead and backing vocals

Additional personnel

- Brian Hopper – soprano and tenor saxophone
- Michael Jeffrey – executive producer
- Byron Goto – cover and liner design
- Henry Epstein – cover and liner design
- Eric Goto – photos

== Charts ==
| Chart (1969) | Peak position |
|---|---|
| Dutch Album Top 100 | 2 |
