= Riddles of the Sphinx =

- Cover of DVD
- Directed by: Laura Mulvey; Peter Wollen
- Written by: Laura Mulvey; Peter Wollen
- Produced by: Laura Mulvey; Peter Wollen
- Starring: Dinah Stabb; Merdelle Jordine; Rhiannon Tise
- Cinematography: Diane Tammes
- Edited by: Carola Klein; Larry Sider
- Music by: Mike Ratledge
- Production company: BFI Production Board
- Distributed by: British Film Institute
- Release date: 1977
- Running time: 92 minutes
- Country: United Kingdom
- Language: English

Riddles of the Sphinx is a 1977 British experimental drama film written, directed and produced by Laura Mulvey and Peter Wollen and starring Dinah Stabb, Merdelle Jordine and Rhiannon Tise.

== Plot ==
The film consists of seven parts. The majority of the film focuses on part four which consists of 13 scenes, which are shot in long, continuous 360-degree pans of middle-class spaces occupied and encountered by the main character, Louise. Louise is dealing with a change in her lifestyle in which she must learn to negotiate domestic life and motherhood. This is occasionally interrupted by sequences of Mulvey talking to the camera, recounting the myth of Oedipus encountering the Sphinx.

== Cast ==
- Dinah Stabb as Louise
- Merdelle Jordine as Maxine
- Rhiannon Tise as Anna
- Clive Merrison as Chris
- Marie Green as Acrobat
- Paula Melbourne as Rope Act
- Crisse Trigger as Juggler
- Mary Maddox as voice Off (voice)
- Laura Mulvey as herself / Voice Off

== Background ==
A feminist experimental film, Riddles of the Sphinx was partly inspired by Mulvey's work on feminist film theory of scopophilia and the male gaze, particularly her influential 1975 essay Visual Pleasure and Narrative Cinema. As she wrote that classical Hollywood cinema favoured the male spectator and his desire to gaze at women, Mulvey and Wollen's film is "an attempt to merge modernist forms with a narrative exploring feminism and psychoanalytical theory". At the time, much of British experimental and avant-garde film was anti-narrative, and so the film is part of a movement that set out to explore and create a feminist language for cinema outside of traditional narrative norms.

In her writing on feminist film theory, Mulvey has argued that, if the dominant cinema produces pleasure through scopophilia which favours the male gaze and festishization of woman as object, then alternative versions of cinema need to construct different forms of pleasure based on psychic relations that adopt a feminist perspective. As such, the lack of exposition, concentration on the gender politics of domestic life, and the 360-degree pans which move slowly and without focus on the women characters in Riddles of the Sphinx, represent the antithesis of the cinematic pleasure seen in the dominant cinematic styles of the time. Frequently, a woman's voice is heard but not identifiable as particular character, further emphasizing "the lost discourse of woman's unconscious". Rather than using a conventional voice-over, a multitude of voices are heard, Louise and her various friends and co-workers, which according to Mulvey is intended to as "a constant return to woman, not indeed as a visual image, but as a subject of inquiry, a content which cannot be considered within the aesthetic lines laid down by traditional cinematic practice."

== Critical reception ==
The BFI comments, "visually accomplished and intellectually rigorous Riddles of the Sphinx is one of the most important avant-garde films to have emerged from Britain during the 1970s".

According to Maggie Humm in Feminism and Film, "Althusser's theory (the Ideological State Apparatus (ISA)) helped Mulvey clarify the systematic mechanisms by which cinematic desires might function, mechanisms which she tried to deconstruct with Brechtian techniques in her own films, particularly Riddles of the Sphinx."

Patricia Erens in Issues in Feminist Film Criticism notes that Riddles of the Sphinx attempts to exhume a female voice that has been repressed by patriarchy, but which has nevertheless remained intact for thousands of years at some unconscious level."
