= Fourth (album) =

Studio album by Soft Machine
- Released: February 1971
- Recorded: October–November 1970 at Olympic Studios, London
- Genres: Jazz fusion; free jazz
- Length: 39:13
- Labels: CBS (UK), Columbia (USA)
- Producer: Soft Machine

Soft Machine chronology
Third (1970)	Fourth (1971)	Fifth (1972)

Professional ratings
Review scores
Source	Rating
AllMusic	4.5/5 stars
Christgau's Record Guide	B

Fourth is the fourth studio album by the rock band Soft Machine, released in 1971. The album is also titled Four or 4 in the USA.

== Overview ==
The numeral "4" is the title as shown on the cover in all countries, but a written-out title appears on the spine and label. This was the group's first all-instrumental album, although their previous album Third had almost completed the band's move in this direction toward instrumental jazz, and a complete abandonment of their original self-presentation as a psychedelic and progressive rock group. It was also the last of their albums to include drummer and founding member Robert Wyatt who afterwards left. He had already recorded a solo album, The End of an Ear (in which he described himself on the cover as an "Out of work pop singer currently on drums with Soft Machine"), and now founded a new group, Matching Mole, whose name was a pun on the French for “Soft Machine”: "Machine Molle".

Like the previous Soft Machine album, some tracks have the band augmented by additional musicians. These include Mark Charig and Nick Evans, who had been in the short-lived septet lineup of late 1969, and Roy Babbington, who would join the band in 1973.

In 1999, Soft Machine albums Fourth and Fifth were re-released together on one CD.

In 2007, Fourth was re-released as part of the series Soft Machine Remastered – The CBS Years 1970–1973.

The booklets of these re-releases contain liner notes written by Mark Powell from Esoteric Recordings about the history of Soft Machine, their musical development and as one of the first relevant bands in the so-called progressive rock scene.

== Track listing ==
All compositions by Hugh Hopper except where indicated.

Side one
No.	Title	Length
1.	"Teeth" (Mike Ratledge)	9:15
2.	"Kings and Queens"	5:02
3.	"Fletcher’s Blemish" (Elton Dean)	4:35
Total length:		18:52

Side two
No.	Title	Length
4.	"Virtually Part 1"	5:16
5.	"Virtually Part 2"	7:09
6.	"Virtually Part 3"	4:33
7.	"Virtually Part 4"	3:23
Total length:		20:21 39:13

== Personnel ==
Soft Machine

- Elton Dean – alto saxophone, saxello
- Mike Ratledge – acoustic piano, Hohner Pianet electric piano, Lowrey organ
- Hugh Hopper – bass guitar, fuzz bass
- Robert Wyatt – drums

Additional personnel

- Roy Babbington – double bass (1, 3, 4, 6)
- Mark Charig – cornet (2, 3, 4)
- Nick Evans – trombone (1, 2, 4)
- Jimmy Hastings – alto flute (6), bass clarinet (1, 6)
- Alan Skidmore – tenor saxophone (1, 6)

== Charts ==
Chart (1971)	Peak position
UK Albums (OCC)	32
