= Fifth (Soft Machine album) =

Studio album by Soft Machine
- Released: July 1972
- Recorded: Nov–Dec 1971 and Jan–Feb 1972 at Advision Studios, London
- Genres: Jazz; jazz fusion; free jazz
- Length: 36:34
- Labels: CBS (UK), Columbia (USA)
- Producer: Soft Machine

Soft Machine chronology
Fourth (1971)	Fifth (1972)	Six (1973)

Professional ratings
Review scores
Source	Rating
AllMusic	3/5 stars

Fifth (the title is Fifth while the front cover shows the number 5), is the fifth studio album by the jazz rock band Soft Machine, released in 1972. In the US the album was identified on cover and label by number (5).

== Overview ==
Fifth was the first Soft Machine album recorded after the departure of original drummer Robert Wyatt and continued the band's progression away from their original blend of psychedelic and progressive rock towards jazz fusion. Wyatt's replacement was Phil Howard, who contributed to the 1971 sessions that comprise side one, after which he left and was replaced by John Marshall for the 1972 sessions that comprise side two. Future member Roy Babbington worked on the album as a session musician, playing double bass on all the tracks on side two. The title "Pigling Bland" is taken from The Tale of Pigling Bland (1913), a children’s story by Beatrix Potter.

== Track listing ==
Side One
No.	Title	Writer(s)	Length
1.	"All White"	Mike Ratledge	6:06
2.	"Drop"	Ratledge	7:42
3.	"M C"	Hugh Hopper	4:57
Total length:			18:45

Side two
No.	Title	Writer(s)	Length
4.	"As If"	Ratledge	8:02
5.	"L B O"	John Marshall	1:54
6.	"Pigling Bland"	Ratledge	4:24
7.	"Bone"	Elton Dean	3:29
Total length:			17:49 36:34

=== 2007 CD reissue bonus track ===
No.	Title	Length
8.	"All White (Take Two)"	7:14

== Personnel ==
Soft Machine

Side one:

- Elton Dean – alto saxophone, saxello; Fender Rhodes electric piano (2)
- Mike Ratledge – Fender Rhodes electric piano, Lowrey organ
- Hugh Hopper – bass guitar
- Phil Howard – drums

Side two:

- Elton Dean – alto saxophone, saxello
- Mike Ratledge – Fender Rhodes electric piano, Lowrey organ
- Hugh Hopper – bass guitar
- John Marshall – drums

Additional musician

- Roy Babbington – double bass (Side two)
