= Hugh Hopper =

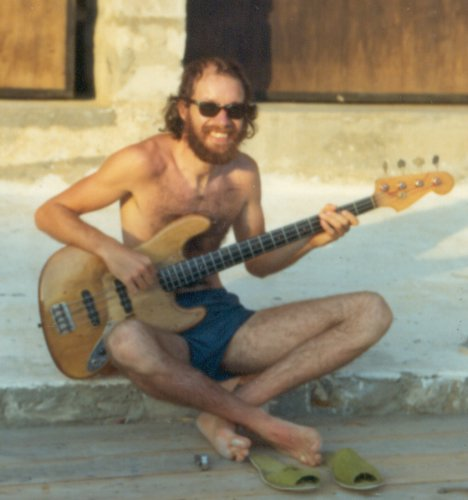
- Hopper in 1972

Background information
- Born: Hugh Colin Hopper; 29 April 1945; Canterbury, Kent, England
- Died: 7 June 2009 (aged 64) Whitstable, Kent, England
- Genres: Jazz fusion; progressive rock; experimental
- Occupations: Musician; songwriter
- Instruments: Bass; guitar; saxophone; mellophone
- Years active: 1963–2009
- Formerly of: The Wilde Flowers; Soft Machine
- Website: hugh-hopper.com

Hugh Colin Hopper (29 April 1945 – 7 June 2009) was a British progressive rock and jazz fusion bass guitarist. He was a prominent member of the Canterbury scene, as a member of Soft Machine and other bands.

== Biography ==
=== Early career ===
Starting in 1963 as bassist with The Daevid Allen Trio, alongside drummer Robert Wyatt, he alternated between free jazz and rhythm and blues. In 1964 with Brian Hopper (his brother), Robert Wyatt, Kevin Ayers and Richard Sinclair he formed The Wilde Flowers, a pop music group. Although they never released any records during their existence (a compilation was released 30 years later), The Wilde Flowers are acknowledged as the founders of the Canterbury scene and spawned its two most important groups, Soft Machine and Caravan.

=== With Soft Machine (1968–1973) ===
Hopper's role with Soft Machine was initially as the group's road manager, but he already composed for their first album The Soft Machine and played bass on one of its tracks. In 1969 he was recruited to be the group's bassist for their second album, Volume Two and, with Mike Ratledge and Robert Wyatt, he took part in a recording session for a solo album of Syd Barrett's (formerly of Pink Floyd, with whom the early Soft Machine had regularly gigged). Hopper continued with Soft Machine, playing bass and contributing numerous compositions until 1973. During his tenure the group evolved from a psychedelic rock group to an instrumental jazz-rock fusion band. In 1972, shortly before leaving Soft Machine, he recorded the first record under his own name, 1984 (named after George Orwell's novel Nineteen Eighty-Four). This was a decidedly non-commercial record featuring lengthy solo pieces using tape loops as well as shorter pieces with a group. Hopper later reminisced about the record, "I don't think a lot of it was very successful, but I remember sitting for about three or four hours at Advision trying to record the sound of a mosquito so that I could use that as a bit of a loop."

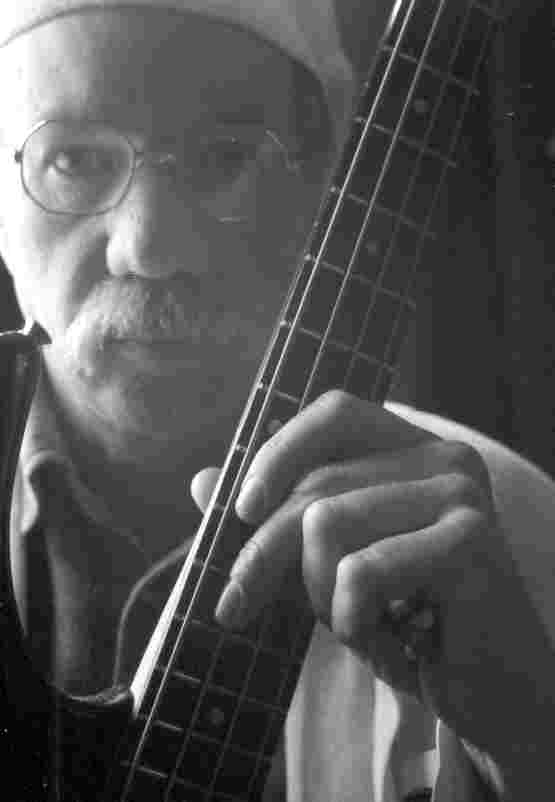
Hopper in 2007

=== 1973 until 2009 ===
After leaving Soft Machine, until the end of the 1970s he worked with such groups as Stomu Yamashta's East Wind, Isotope, Gilgamesh, and the Carla Bley Band. He also played in a couple of cooperative bands alongside former Soft Machine saxophonist Elton Dean: Hopper/Dean/Tippett/Gallivan (with pianist Keith Tippett and drummer Joe Gallivan) and Soft Heap (with keyboard-player Alan Gowen and drummer Pip Pyle).

In the early 1980s Hopper gave up playing music for a couple of years, but by the mid-1980s he was actively working with several bands, including Pip Pyle's Equipe Out and Phil Miller's In Cahoots. He also began playing with a group of Dutch musicians in a band initially called Hopper Goes Dutch. After French guitarist Patrice Meyer joined, this group became known as the Hugh Hopper Franglo-Dutch Band.

After many years working primarily in instrumental, jazz-oriented groups including Short Wave, in the mid-1990s Hopper began occasionally working again in more rock-oriented vocal contexts, including several collaborations with the band Caveman Shoestore (using the name Hughscore) and with singer Lisa S. Klossner. He also returned to his early tape loop experiments, but now using computer technology, in recordings such as Jazzloops (2002).

In the 1990s and 2000s several projects led Hopper to revisit his Soft Machine past. In 1998 he was asked to participate in a project by the French jazz collective Polysons, joining them in performances of Softs classics which featured Polysons members (Pierre-Olivier Govin and Jean-Rémy Guédon on saxes, Serge Adam on trumpet and François Merville on drums) plus organist Emmanuel Bex. The resulting Polysoft group was re-activated in 2002–03 to perform at Parisian club Le Triton, with fellow ex-Softs Elton Dean sitting in, resulting in a live CD, Tribute To Soft Machine, released on the club's own label.

Also in 2002–04, Hopper, Dean and two other former Soft Machine members (drummer John Marshall, and guitarist Allan Holdsworth) toured and recorded under the name SoftWorks. With another former Soft Machine member, guitarist John Etheridge, replacing Holdsworth, they toured and recorded as Soft Machine Legacy, playing some pieces from the original Soft Machine repertoire as well as new works. Three albums of theirs were released: Live in Zaandam (CD, rec. 2005/05/10), New Morning – The Paris Concert (DVD, rec. 2005/12/12) and the studio album Soft Machine Legacy (CD, 2006, rec. 09/2005). After Elton Dean died in February 2006, Theo Travis replaced him, and Soft Machine Legacy recorded the album Steam, released in 2007.

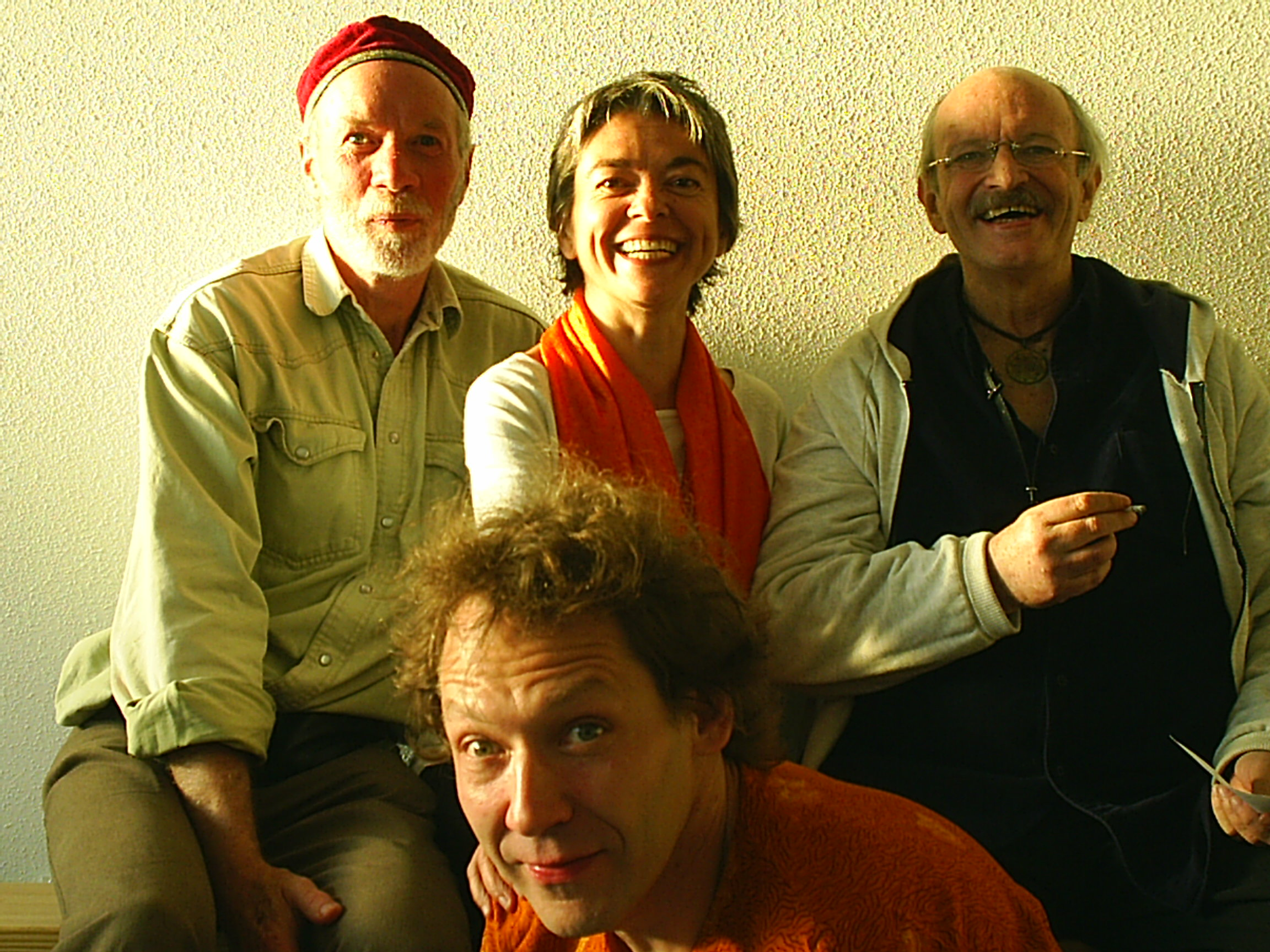
Soft Bounds

Other occasional projects were Soft Bounds (with French musicians Sophia Domancich and Simon Goubert, first with Elton Dean and then Simon Picard), which like PolySoft released a live CD recorded at the Triton club, and Clear Frame, an improvising group with Charles Hayward, Lol Coxhill and Orphy Robinson (augmented for their first release by Robert Wyatt on cornet). Hopper also appeared on the 2004 debut solo album by No-Man singer Tim Bowness (My Hotel Year, on One Little Indian Records.

Hopper recorded two solo albums for, and established an online shop via, the highly regarded UK-based internet label, Burning Shed. He worked with Japanese musician and composer Yumi Hara Cawkwell as a duo called HUMI. They had a tour of Japan planned for early 2008, which did not happen due to Hopper's health.

Hopper was diagnosed with leukaemia in June 2008 and underwent chemotherapy. As a result of his illness and the treatment, he cancelled all his concert appearances. A Hugh Hopper benefit concert took place in December 2008 at the 100 Club in London and featured In Cahoots, members of Soft Machine Legacy, Delta Sax Quartet, Sophia Domancich and Simon Goubert, Yumi Hara Cawkwell, and the Alex Maguire Sextet. Another benefit was planned for late June 2009. He married his partner Christine on 5 June 2009 and died of leukaemia on 7 June. His funeral, a Tibetan Buddhist ceremony to respect Hugh's wishes, was held on 25 June 2009.

A series of ten CDs of unreleased live and studio recordings began release in 2014 by Gonzo MultiMedia to benefit Hugh's family.

== Discography ==
=== Under his name ===
- 1973: 1984
- 1974: Monster Band (released 1979)
- 1976: Hopper Tunity Box
- 1984: Hugh Hopper and Odd Friends (EP, released 1993)
- 1987: Alive!
- 1990: Meccano Pelorus
- 1994: Hooligan Romantics
- 1994: Carousel
- 1996: Best Soft (compilation)
- 2000: Parabolic Versions (collaborations)
- 2003: Jazzloops (collaborations)
- 2007: Numero D’Vol (Moonjune-Bandcamp)
- 2008: The Gift Of Purpose (live recording by Bone)
- 2014: Volume 1: Memories (archival collection)
- 2014: Volume 2: Frangloband (Triton Club, Paris, 2004)
- 2014: Volume 3: North & South (with Mike Travis, Aberdeen, 1995)
- 2014: Volume 4: Four by Hugh by Four (Bimhuis, Amsterdam, 2000)
- 2014: Volume 5: Heart to Heart (with Phil Miller, Amsterdam, 2007)
- 2014: Volume 6: Special Friends (Short Wave concerts 1992 through 1995)
- 2014: Volume 7: Soft Boundaries (Triton Club, Paris, 2005)
- 2014: Volume 8: Bass On Top (studio, Israel, 2007)
- 2015: Volume 9: Anatomy of Facelift (five performances of "Facelift" by Soft Machine, 1969 through 1971)
- 2015: Volume 10: Was A Friend (various one-off collaborations)

=== Collaborations ===
- 1976: Cruel But Fair (Hugh Hopper, Elton Dean, Keith Tippett, Joe Gallivan)
- 1977: Mercy Dash (Hugh Hopper, Elton Dean, Keith Tippett, Joe Gallivan; released 1985)
- 1978: Rogue Element (Soft Head: Hugh Hopper/Elton Dean/Alan Gowen/Dave Sheen)
- 1979: Soft Heap (Soft Heap: Hugh Hopper/Elton Dean/Alan Gowen/Pip Pyle)
- 1979: Al Dente (Soft Heap: Hugh Hopper/Elton Dean/Alan Gowen/Pip Pyle, live)
- 1980: Two Rainbows Daily (Hugh Hopper & Alan Gowen)
- 1980: Bracknell-Bresse Improvisations (Hugh Hopper, Alan Gowen, Nigel Morris; released 1996)
- 1983: Somewhere in France (Hugh Hopper & Richard Sinclair; released 1996)
- 1993: Short Wave Live (Hugh Hopper, Didier Malherbe, Phil Miller, Pip Pyle)
- 1994: A Remark Hugh Made (Hugh Hopper & Kramer)
- 1995: Adreamor (Hugh Hopper & Mark Hewins)
- 1996: Elephants in your head? (MASHU: Mark Hewins/Shyamal/Hugh Hopper)
- 1997: Huge (Hugh Hopper & Kramer)
- 1998: Different (Hugh Hopper & Lisa S. Klossner)
- 1998: The Mind in the Trees (Hugh Hopper, Elton Dean, Frances Knight, Vince Clarke; released 2003)
- 2000: Cryptids (Hugh Hopper & Lisa S. Klossner)
- 2000: The Swimmer (Hugh Hopper, Jan Ponsford, Frances Knight, Vince Clarke; released 2005)
- 2002: Flight'n Shade (Hugh Hopper & Micaël Gidon)
- 2003: Home (Jeff Sherman with Hugh Hopper)
- 2003: In a Dubious Manner (Hugh Hopper & Julian Whitfield)
- 2004: The Stolen Hour (comics by Matt Howarth)
- 2004: Bananamoon Obscura No. 2 - Live in the UK (Hugh Hopper, Daevid Allen, Pip Pyle)
- 2007: Numero D'Vol (Hugh Hopper, Simon Picard, Steve Franklin, Charles Hayward)
- 2007: 'Branes (Jeff Sherman & Hugh Hopper)
- 2008: Dune (Humi: Hugh Hopper & Yumi Hara Cawkwell)
- 2008: Goat Hopper (Hugh Hopper & Honey Ride Me A Goat)

=== With Soft Machine ===
Studio albums (see Soft Machine discography for live albums)

- 1968: The Soft Machine (played on one track as a guest musician but also has writing credits on several tracks)
- 1969: Volume Two (first album as an official band member)
- 1970: Third
- 1971: Fourth
- 1972: Fifth
- 1973: Six
- 2003: Abracadabra (as Soft Works)
- 2006: Soft Machine Legacy (as Soft Machine Legacy)
- 2007 Steam (as Soft Machine Legacy)

=== Contributions ===
- 1962-9 Various Artists: Canterburied Sounds
- 1963 Daevid Allen Trio: Live 1963
- 1965-69: The Wilde Flowers: The Wilde Flowers
- 1968: Robert Wyatt: '68 (released 2013)
- 1969: Syd Barrett: The Madcap Laughs (two tracks)
- 1969: Kevin Ayers: Joy of a Toy
- 1973: Stomu Yamashta's East Wind: Freedom Is Frightening
- 1974: Robert Wyatt: Rock Bottom
- 1974: Robert Wyatt: Theatre Royal Drury Lane
- 1974: Stomu Yamashta: One by One
- 1975: Isotope: Illusion
- 1976: Isotope: Deep End
- 1976: Gary Windo: His Master's Bones
- 1978: Carla Bley Band: European Tour 1977
- 1978: Gilgamesh: Another Fine Tune You've Got Me Into
- 1981: Gilli Smyth & Mother Gong: Robot Woman
- 1984: Robert Wyatt: Work In Progress (EP)
- 1985: Pip Pyle: L'Equipe Out
- 1985: In Cahoots: Cutting Both Ways
- 1986: Patrice Meyer: Dromedaire viennois
- 1987: Anaid: Belladonna
- 1989: In Cahoots: Live 86–89
- 1991: Lindsay Cooper: Oh Moscow
- 1992: Daevid Allen: Twelve Selves
- 1994: Richard Sinclair: R.S.V.P.
- 1994: Conglomerate: Precisely the Opposite of What We Know to Be True
- 1995: Kramer: Still Alive In 95
- 1995: Various Artists: Unsettled Scores
- 1995: Caveman Hughscore: Caveman Hughscore
- 1995: Gizmo: Eyewitness
- 1997: Hughscore: Highspot Paradox
- 1998: Pip Pyle: 7 Year Itch
- 1998: Brainville: The Children's Crusade
- 1999: Caravan: All Over You Too
- 1999: Hughscore: Delta Flora
- 2001: Glass Cage: Glass Cage Paratactile
- 2002: Soft Works: Abracadabra
- 2002: Polysoft: Tribute to Soft Machine
- 2003: Glass: Live at Progman Cometh
- 2003: Robert Wyatt: Solar Flares Burn for You
- 2003: Soft Mountain: Soft Mountain
- 2003: Bone: Uses Wrist Grab
- 2004: Soft Bounds: Live at Le Triton
- 2004: Brian Hopper: If Ever I Am
- 2005: Glass: Illuminations
- 2005: NDIO: Airback
- 2005: Brainville: Live in the UK
- 2005: Soft Machine Legacy: Live in Zaandam
- 2006: Soft Machine Legacy: Soft Machine Legacy
- 2007: Delta Saxophone Quartet: Dedicated To You... But You Weren't Listening: The Music of Soft Machine
- 2007: Soft Machine Legacy: Steam
- 2008: Clear Frame: Clear Frame
- 2008: Brainville3: Trial by Headline

== Bibliography ==
- H.C. & L.T. Hopper: Thirty Kent Churches, ISBN 0-9506394-0-0 – Great Stour Publications – limited edition 750 cop. – with his father Leslie – (01.12.1978) – calligraphy and map: Leon Olin and Sylvia Gansford
- Hugh Hopper: The Rock Bass Manual – the complete guide to the electric bass guitar, ISBN 0-907937-16-0 – Portland Publications (1984)

== Filmography ==
- 2015: Romantic Warriors III: Canterbury Tales (DVD)
