= The Wilde Flowers =

British rock band (1964–1967)

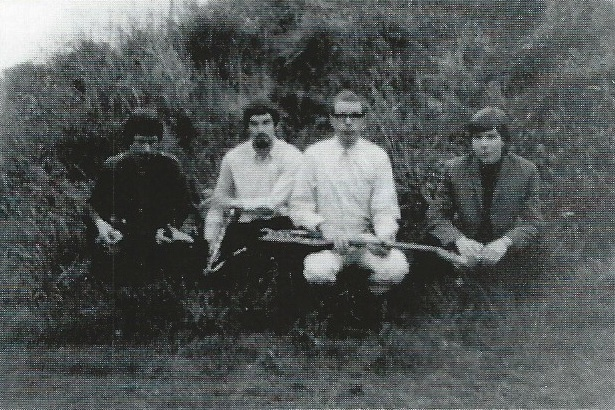
- The Wilde Flowers in 1966 (L to R): Pye Hastings, Brian Hopper, Hugh Hopper, Richard Coughlan.

Background information
- Origin: Canterbury, England
- Genres: Psychedelic rock; progressive rock; rhythm and blues
- Years active: 1964–1967
- Spinoffs: Caravan; Soft Machine
- Past members: Brian Hopper; Hugh Hopper; Robert Wyatt; Richard Sinclair; Kevin Ayers; Graham Flight; Richard Coughlan; Pye Hastings; Dave Lawrence; Dave Sinclair

The Wilde Flowers were an English psychedelic rock band from Canterbury, Kent. Formed in 1964, the group originally featured lead vocalist Kevin Ayers, lead guitarist and co-lead vocalist Brian Hopper, rhythm guitarist and vocalist Richard Sinclair, bassist Hugh Hopper and drummer Robert Wyatt. Despite not releasing any material during their brief three-year tenure, the band are generally considered to be the originators of the Canterbury scene. After their breakup in 1969, the group's members went on to form numerous key bands within the scene, including Soft Machine and Caravan.

== History ==
After several years of jamming together, the Wilde Flowers were officially formed in 1964 by lead vocalist Kevin Ayers, lead guitarist, saxophonist and vocalist Brian Hopper, rhythm guitarist and vocalist Richard Sinclair, bassist and saxophonist Hugh Hopper, and drummer and vocalist Robert Wyatt. The group performed a series of live shows before their first recording session in March 1965, at which they tracked Hugh Hopper's "Memories", Ayers's "She's Gone", and cover versions of Mose Allison's "Parchman Farm" and Chuck Berry's "Almost Grown". Shortly after the sessions, Ayers left to start working with Daevid Allen ahead of the formation of Soft Machine, with vocals at a session the following month performed by Wyatt before a permanent replacement was found.

In April, Ayers's place was taken by vocalist and harmonica player Graham Flight, his roommate. With their new frontman, the Wilde Flowers recorded their second batch of songs in the summer of 1965, including two tracks by Hugh Hopper, one by Brian Hopper and one by Wyatt. By September, both Flight and Sinclair had left, with Wyatt taking over on lead vocals and Richard Coughlan joining on drums. During the spring of 1966, this four-piece lineup of the band performed at the Melody Maker Rock/Folk Contest, as well as recording seven more tracks, most of which were written by Hugh Hopper.

Pye Hastings joined as Sinclair's replacement shortly after the spring 1966 recording session, and later took on lead vocals when Wyatt left to join the founding lineup of Soft Machine. Hugh Hopper left shortly thereafter, with Dave Lawrence taking his place. Richard Sinclair's cousin Dave also joined the band on keyboards. However, by October 1967 the group had disbanded, with Hastings, Coughlan and the Sinclair cousins going on to form Caravan in January 1968. The Hopper brothers went on to join Wyatt in Soft Machine.

In 1994, a collection of the recordings made by the Wilde Flowers were released for the first time by Voiceprint Records. The self-titled album also featured a number of tracks recorded in August 1969, after the band's breakup, by former members Hastings, Wyatt and the Hoppers. In subsequent years, the group have been credited for their introduction of Canterbury scene through a number of offshoot bands. In a review of a remastered collection of their tracks, Uncut writer Tom Pinnock credited the Wilde Flowers for "spawn[ing] a whole batch of England's finest songwriters and musicians", as well as "an entire genre". Similarly, Kieron Tyler of The Arts Desk credited the band for being "the hothouse enabling [its members] to refine their visions and pursue future paths".

== Members ==
- Brian Hopper – lead guitar (1964–1965); saxophone, vocals (1964–1967)
- Hugh Hopper – bass (1964–1966); saxophone (1966–1967), backing vocals (1964–1967; died 2009)
- Robert Wyatt – drums, percussion, backing vocals (1964–1965); lead vocals, tambourine, trombone (1965–1966)
- Richard Sinclair – rhythm guitar, vocals (1964–1965)
- Kevin Ayers – lead vocals, tambourine (1964–1965; died 2013)
- Graham Flight – lead vocals, harmonica (1965)
- Richard Coughlan – drums, percussion (1965–1967; died 2013)
- Pye Hastings – lead vocals, guitars (1965–1967)
- Dave Sinclair – keyboards, piano (1966–1967)
- Dave Lawrence – bass, backing vocals (1966–1967)

== Discography ==
- Tales of Canterbury: The Wilde Flowers Story (1994)
- Canterburied Sounds, Vol. 1–4 (1998)
- The Wilde Flowers (2015, reissue)
