= Soft Machine =

English rock band

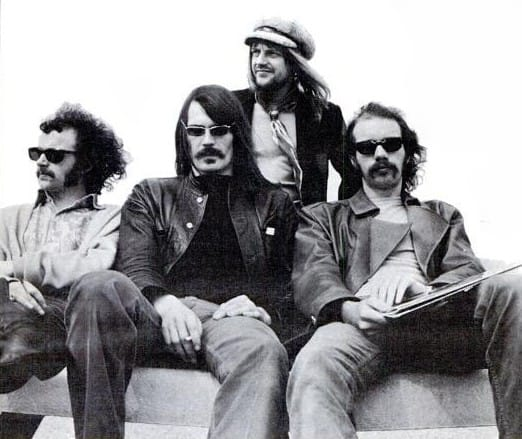
- Soft Machine in 1970: l-r: Elton Dean, Mike Ratledge, Robert Wyatt, Hugh Hopper

Background information
- Origin: Canterbury, England
- Genres: Canterbury scene; jazz rock; psychedelic rock; progressive rock; instrumental rock
- Works: Discography
- Years active: 1966–1978; 1980–1981; 1984; 2015–present
- Labels: ABC; Probe; Columbia; Harvest; EMI; Major League Productions; MoonJune Records
- Spinoffs: Planet Earth; Soft Heap / Soft Head; Soft Ware (Note: 1999–2002); Rubba; 2nd Vision; Rollercoaster; Soft Works (Note: 2002–2004); Soft Mountain (Note: 2003); Soft Bounds (Note: 2004); Soft Machine Legacy (Note: 2004–2015)
- Spinoff of: The Wilde Flowers
- Members: John Etheridge; Theo Travis; Fred Baker; Asaf Sirkis
- Past members: Mike Ratledge; Robert Wyatt; Kevin Ayers; Daevid Allen; Larry Nowlin; Andy Summers; Hugh Hopper; Brian Hopper; Elton Dean; Lyn Dobson; Mark Charig; Nick Evans; Phil Howard; John Marshall; Karl Jenkins; Roy Babbington; Allan Holdsworth; Alan Wakeman; Ray Warleigh; Ric Sanders; Percy Jones; Steve Cook; Jack Bruce; Stu Calver; Dick Morrissey; Alan Parker; John Perry; Tony Rivers; John Taylor; Paul Carmichael; Dave MacRae
- Website: softmachine.org

Soft Machine are an English rock band from Canterbury, Kent. The band were formed in 1966 by Mike Ratledge, Robert Wyatt, Kevin Ayers, Daevid Allen and Larry Nowlin. Soft Machine were central in the Canterbury scene; they became one of the first British psychedelic acts, and later helped pioneer progressive and jazz rock. Soft Machine's lineup has undergone many changes, and has included Andy Summers, Hugh Hopper, Elton Dean, John Marshall, Karl Jenkins, Roy Babbington and Allan Holdsworth. As of 2025, the current lineup consists of John Etheridge, Theo Travis, Fred Thelonious Baker and Asaf Sirkis. The band's name originates from William S. Burroughs's novel The Soft Machine.

Originating from the band The Wilde Flowers, Soft Machine began as a psychedelic rock band, releasing their self-titled debut album in 1968. Their second album, Volume Two (1969), marked their move towards progressive rock and jazz rock, which was fully realised with the subsequent two albums, Third (1970) and Fourth (1971). By 1971, Soft Machine became a purely instrumental jazz rock band, continuing this direction across their subsequent albums, Fifth (1972), Six, Seven (both 1973), Bundles (1975), Softs (1976), and Alive & Well (1978).

The band split in 1978, though two brief reunions occurred during the 1980s, first for the recording of the album Land of Cockayne (1981), and then for a few live shows in 1984. The group Soft Machine Legacy was formed in 2004, and released three studio albums, including their self-titled debut (2006), Steam (2007), and Burden of Proof (2013). The "Legacy" suffix was dropped in 2015, and they have since released three studio albums, Hidden Details (2018), Other Doors (2023) and Thirteen (2026). Though the band has achieved little commercial success, critics consider Soft Machine to have been influential in rock music. Dave Lynch at AllMusic called them "one of the most influential underground bands of their era".

== History ==
=== Original run (1966–78) ===
==== Early releases and The Soft Machine (1966–1968) ====
In mid-1966, Mike Ratledge (keyboards), Robert Wyatt (drums, vocals), Kevin Ayers (bass, vocals), Daevid Allen (guitar) and Larry Nowlin (guitar) formed Soft Machine, who were billed as The Soft Machine up to 1969 or 1970. Allen and Wyatt first played together in 1963 as part of the Daevid Allen Trio, and were occasionally accompanied by Ratledge. In 1964, Wyatt and Ayers were founder members of The Wilde Flowers; by 1966, they had both left that band and rejoined Allen to form the short-lived band Mister Head, which also included Nowlin. The four members soon joined with Ratledge to form the Soft Machine. Ayers suggested the band's name, which comes from William S. Burroughs's novel The Soft Machine (1961), after the group performed under several other names including the Four Skins. The band became a quartet when Nowlin departed in September 1966.

During late 1966 and early 1967, the Soft Machine became involved in the early UK underground scene. Along with Pink Floyd, they became one of the major resident bands at the UFO Club, and played other London clubs like the Speakeasy and Middle Earth. According to Wyatt, the Soft Machine received negative reactions when playing at venues other than these underground clubs; this led to their penchant for long tracks and segued tunes because continuously playing deprived their audiences chances to boo them. In February 1967, the band released their first single "Love Makes Sweet Music" on Polydor Records.

In April 1967, the Soft Machine recorded nine demo songs with producer Giorgio Gomelsky in De Lane Lea Studios; due to a dispute over studio costs, these tracks were unreleased for several years. Polydor later released these demos in 1972 as Jet Propelled Photographs. Later in 1967, the band began touring in mainland Europe, becoming especially popular in France. When returning from a tour of France in August, Allen, an Australian, was denied re-entry to the UK, so the group continued as a trio while Allen returned to Paris to form Gong.

The Soft Machine, who shared the same management as the Jimi Hendrix Experience, supported them on two North American tours during 1968. The band signed to Probe Records and recorded their eponymous first album in New York City in April at the end of the first tour, though it was not released until December. In London, guitarist Andy Summers, later of the Police, joined the Soft Machine. The band's new line-up began a US tour with some headlining shows before supporting Hendrix in August and September 1968. By the time the Hendrix tour began, Summers had been fired at Ayers' insistence. Ayers himself departed amicably after the final tour date at the Hollywood Bowl in September, and the Soft Machine disbanded. Wyatt stayed in the US to record solo demos while Ratledge returned to London and began composing.

==== Transition into jazz; Volume Two, Third, and Fourth (1969–1971) ====
In December 1968, to fulfil contractual obligations, Wyatt and Ratledge re-formed the Soft Machine with their former road manager Hugh Hopper replacing Ayers on bass. Hopper, like Ayers and Wyatt, was a founding member of The Wilde Flowers. In 1969, the Soft Machine recorded their second album Volume Two, which started a change to jazz fusion. The album fulfilled the band's contract with Probe and they signed with CBS Records by the beginning of 1970. In May 1969, the Soft Machine played as the uncredited backing band on two tracks of The Madcap Laughs, the debut solo album of Pink Floyd's Syd Barrett. Shortly after the Barrett recording, Hopper's brother Brian Hopper, another Wilde Flowers co-founder, joined the Soft Machine on saxophone. Around this time, the band recorded the soundtrack for a multimedia show called Spaced, which ran in London for five days in mid 1969. The soundtrack was commercially released in 1996 by Cuneiform Records. In October 1969, following Brian Hopper's departure, the Soft Machine expanded to a septet; Wyatt, Ratledge and Hugh Hopper added a four-piece horn section composed of the saxophonists Elton Dean and Lyn Dobson, cornet player Mark Charig and trombonist Nick Evans. After two months, Charig and Evans departed the band.

The quintet continued until March 1970, when Dobson departed. The remaining quartet recorded the double album Third (1970) and its single-album follow-up Fourth (1971). Third was mostly instrumental save for Wyatt's song "Moon in June", the last Soft Machine song to have lyrics. Third is unusual for its time in having each of the four sides feature one suite. Third has since become Soft Machine's biggest-selling album. From Fourth onwards, the band became completely instrumental on record, and then on stage following Wyatt's departure soon after the album's release. During this period, the band received unprecedented acclaim across Europe, and they became the first rock band to be invited to play in August 1970 at London's Proms concert, and the show was broadcast live on UK national television.

==== Fifth to Softs and breakup (1972–1978) ====
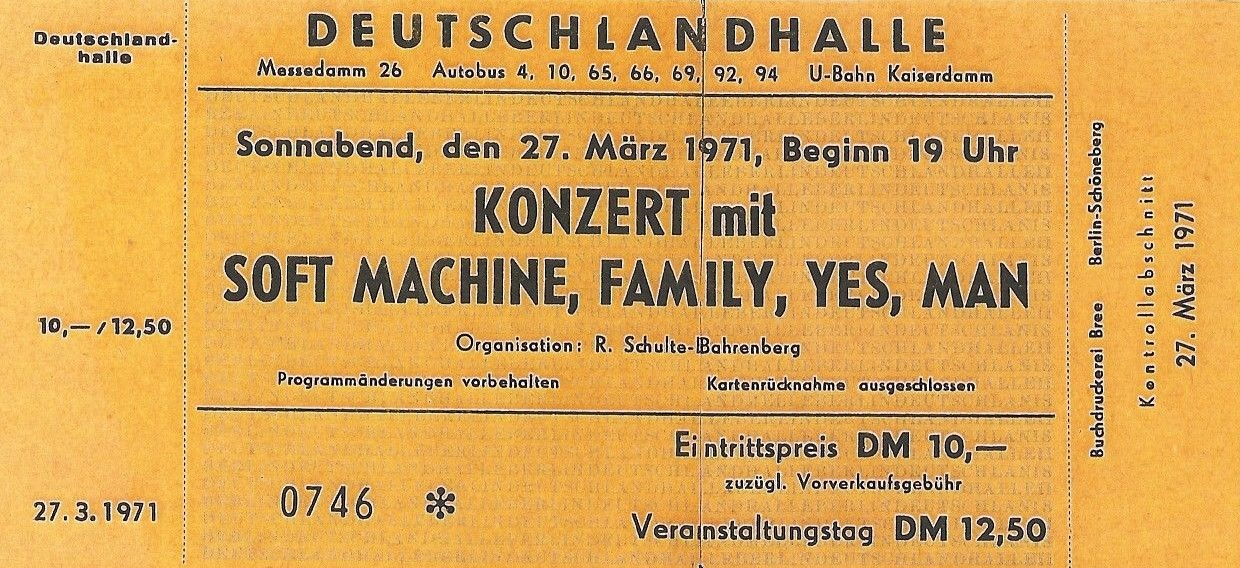
Ticket for a 1971 Soft Machine concert in the Deutschlandhalle, West Berlin, supported by Family, Yes and Man.

After differences over the group's musical direction, Wyatt was fired in August 1971 and formed Matching Mole (a pun on "machine molle", French for "soft machine"; also said at the time to have been taken from stage lighting equipment "Matching Mole"). He was briefly replaced by Australian drummer Phil Howard. This line-up toured extensively in Europe during late 1971 and began the recording of their next album Fifth, but further musical disagreements led to Howard's dismissal at the beginning of 1972, with the album being completed with his replacement, John Marshall. Fifth was released in 1972, with side one comprising tracks recorded with Howard and side two comprising tracks recorded with Marshall. Later that year, Dean left the band and was replaced by Karl Jenkins, who also played keyboards in addition to saxophone. Both Marshall and Jenkins were former members of Ian Carr's Nucleus. The band's next album was a half-live half-studio double album Six, released in early 1973.

After the release of Six, Hopper left the band and was replaced by Roy Babbington, another former Nucleus member. During this period, Jenkins began to take over as bandleader and main composer. After they released Seven in late 1973, Soft Machine again switched record labels from CBS to Harvest Records, a sub-label of EMI Records. At the end of 1973, another former Nucleus member Allan Holdsworth was added to the band, becoming their first guitarist since Andy Summers' brief tenure in 1968. Holdsworth played on the next album Bundles (1975) before leaving in early 1975. Holdsworth's replacement was John Etheridge, and the saxophonist Alan Wakeman, a cousin of Yes keyboardist Rick Wakeman, also joined at the beginning of 1976. The next album, Softs (1976), was the first without Ratledge, the last-remaining original member of the band, who left in March 1976. Other members of Soft Machine during the late 1970s were the saxophonist Ray Warleigh, the violinist Ric Sanders, and the bassists Percy Jones of Brand X and Steve Cook. During 1977, Soft Machine recorded the live album Alive & Well: Recorded in Paris, which was released early the following year. In 1978, Soft Machine gave only one live performance, which was at the Sound & Musik Festival in Dortmund, West Germany, on 8 December, with a line-up of Marshall, Jenkins, Cook and Holdsworth. After this show, Soft Machine disbanded.

=== Occasional reunions (1980–81; 1984) ===
The name Soft Machine was resurrected for the 1981 album Land of Cockayne. Soft Machine also briefly reformed for a series of concerts at London's Ronnie Scott's Jazz Club in mid 1984 (Note: A week of gigs from 30 July to 4 August 1984.) that featured John Marshall, Karl Jenkins, Ray Warleigh, John Etheridge, bassist Paul Carmichael and pianist Dave MacRae.

=== Alternative bands (1978–2015) ===
==== Soft Heap / Soft Head (1978–88) ====
Soft Heap was formed in January 1978 by Hugh Hopper and Elton Dean from Soft Machine, and Alan Gowen and Pip Pyle from National Health. Heap is an acronym that is composed of the initials of the members' first names. The band toured in the early-to-mid 1978 as Soft Head because Dave Sheen replaced Pip Pyle due to Pyle's commitments to National Health. The live album Rogue Element was recorded on that tour and was released in 1978.

The original Soft Heap line-up reformed in October 1978 to record their eponymous studio album, which was released in 1979. After two line-up changes from 1979 to 1981, the new line-up intermittently toured throughout the 1980s; they performed four tours during the decade in 25 European concerts, culminating on 11 May 1988 at the festival "Jazz sous les pommiers" in Coutances, France.

==== Soft Ware (1999), Soft Works (2002–04), Soft Mountain (2003) and Soft Bounds (2004) ====
Soft Ware (sometimes SoftWhere), which was formed in September 1999, was composed of Elton Dean, Hugh Hopper, John Marshall on drums and Marshall's long-time friend Keith Tippett. This short-lived line-up played one performance at (Augustusburg Hunting Lodge, Germany, on 4 September 1999. In 2002, with Tippett unavailable, another former Soft Machine member Allan Holdsworth (on guitar) joined the other three members of Soft Ware, who in June 2002 renamed themselves Soft Works to avoid confusion with Peter Mergener's band Software. Soft Works made their live debut on 17 August 2002 at the Progman Cometh Festival at Moore Theater in Seattle, Washington; and a live album of the performance was released on 29 July 2003. Their only studio album Abracadabra, consisting of new material and recorded at Eastcote Studios, London, on 5–7 June 2002. The album was toured in Japan in August 2003, Italy in January and February 2004, and Mexico in March 2004.

During a Japanese Soft Works tour in August 2003, Elton Dean on saxophone and Hugh Hopper on bass formed the band Soft Mountain along with Japanese musicians Hoppy Kamiyama on keyboards, whom Hopper had met two years earlier, and Yoshida Tatsuya from the band Ruins on drums. Soft Mountain named themselves after Hoppy Kamiyama, whose name translates as "God Mountain". Looking for a break from relatively fixed set lists and song forms, Hugh Hopper had contacted Kamiyama with the idea of using a studio for one day to see what might happen. Kamiyama brought in Tatsuya, and, with no discussion, the quartet played two 45-minute improvisations. In 2007, a year after Elton Dean died aged 60, Soft Mountain released the eponymous album they had recorded on 10 August 2003 in Tokyo, Japan. The two-part "Soft Mountain Suite" extracts the best thirty minutes from each improvisation.

In June 2004, Elton Dean and Hugh Hopper formed the band Soft Bounds with Sophia Domancich on keyboards and Simon Goubert on drums); they played at the Festival "Les Tritonales" in Les Lilas, Paris, France. This concert was partially released in 2005 as the Soft Bounds' album Live at Le Triton.

==== Soft Machine Legacy (2004–15) ====
In October 2004, the members of Soft Works, with John Etheridge permanently replacing Holdsworth, took the name "Soft Machine Legacy" and performed two festival shows; one on 9 October in Turkey and the other on 15 October in the Czech Republic. Liam Genockey temporarily replaced John Marshall who had ligament problems. The new band's line-up was Elton Dean, John Etheridge, Hugh Hopper and Liam Genockey. Soft Machine Legacy released three albums: Live in Zaandam (2005), the studio album Soft Machine Legacy (2006), which was recorded in September 2005 and features fresh material, and Live at the New Morning (2006). After Elton Dean died in February 2006, the band continued with the British saxophonist and flautist Theo Travis, formerly of Gong and The Tangent.

In December 2006, the new Legacy line-up recorded the album Steam in Jon Hiseman's studio. Steam was released in August 2007 by Moonjune Records before a European tour. Hopper left the band in 2008 because he was suffering from leukaemia, so for live performances Fred Thelonious Baker deputising for Hopper. Following Hopper's death in 2009, the band announced they would continue with Roy Babbington again replacing Hopper on bass.

Soft Machine Legacy released their fifth album in October 2010; the 58-minute record Live Adventures was recorded live in October 2009 in Austria and Germany during a European tour. Founding Soft Machine bassist Kevin Ayers died in February 2013 at aged 68, and 77-year-old Daevid Allen died in March 2015 from cancer. On 18 March 2013, the Legacy band released a new studio album titled Burden of Proof. Travis stated: "legally we could actually be called Soft Machine but for various reasons it was decided to be one step removed".

=== A return to the name "Soft Machine" (2015–present) ===
==== Reformation and Hidden Details (2015–2018) ====
In September and October 2015, it was announced Soft Machine Legacy, which was composed of drummer John Marshall, guitarist John Etheridge, bassist Roy Babbington, and sax, flute and keyboard player Theo Travis, would be performing under the name Soft Machine in late 2015 and early 2016: they would perform two shows in the Netherlands and Belgium in early December 2015, (Note: On 2 December 2015 at Cultuurpodium Boerderij in Zoetermeer, Netherlands and on 4 December 2015 at N9 Villa in Eeklo, Belgium.) and seven UK shows in March and April 2016. (Note: On 18 March 2016 as part of the HRH Prog 4 Festival (scheduled from 17 to 20 March) at Camp HRH (Hafan y Môr Holiday Park), Pwllheli, North Wales, UK, on 19 March at the Brewery Arts Centre, Kendal, UK, on 20 March at the Bristol Jazz Festival, Bristol, UK (once scheduled then cancelled and rescheduled for 16 November 2016 at The Robin 2, Wolverhampton, UK), on 24 March 2016 at the Talking Heads in Southampton, UK, on 26 March 2016 at Trading Boundaries, Sheffield Green, East Sussex, UK, on 30 March at the Assembly Rooms, Leamington Spa, UK, on 31 March 2016 at the Band on the Wall in Manchester, UK, on 1 April 2016 at Nell's Jazz & Blues Club in London, UK.) In December 2015, it was confirmed the band were dropping the word "Legacy" from their name, becoming known as Soft Machine for the first time since 1984.

The former Soft Machine member Allan Holdsworth, aged 70, died from heart failure on 15 April 2017 at his home in Vista, California. On 7 September 2018, Soft Machine released Hidden Details on Dyad Records in the UK and Tonefloat Records in the US, their first new studio album since Land of Cockayne (1981). In late 2018 and until February 2019, they toured the world to mark their 50th anniversary and to support the new album. (Note: Soft Machine embarked on 6 September 2018 in Oslo, Norway on a world tour starting with a 10-date Europe leg (ended on 19 September 2018 in Jena, Germany); followed on 6 October in Baltimore by a 12-date North American leg – their first North American tour since 1974 (ended on 23 October in Saint Paul, Minnesota); followed on 3 November in Canterbury by an 11-date second European leg (ended on 16 December 2018 in Bonn, Germany); and embarked on 21 January 2019 on a 14-date second North American leg (ended by a 5-date residency from 4 to 8 February 2019 at Key West, Florida through Cozumel, Mexico at the Cruise to the Edge festival).)

==== Further tours, Other Doors and Thirteen (2019–present) ====
On 20 March 2020, Soft Machine released Live at The Baked Potato, their first original live album since Alive & Well (1978). It was recorded live on 1 February 2019 at The Baked Potato, Los Angeles, and was initially only available as a twelve-track limited-edition double vinyl LP of 200 copies but it has since been released on Compact Disc (CD). The album documents their extensive 2018–2019 world tour. On 7 December 2021, Soft Machine announced Babbington was retiring from the band and would be replaced by Fred Thelonious Baker.

In June 2023, Soft Machine released the new studio album Other Doors, which was recorded with John Marshall before he retired from music. Marshall died on 16 September 2023. As of January 2023, the line-up of Soft Machine was Etheridge, Travis, Baker and drummer Asaf Sirkis. They embarked on a seven-date UK tour beginning on 3 February 2023 at the New Cross Inn in London and ending on 26 May 2023 at City Varieties in Leeds. (Note: On 3 February 2023 at the New Cross Inn (a pub in New Cross) in London; 8 February at the Tivoli Theatre, Wimborne; 9 February at The Pavilion, Falmouth; 15 February at Band on the Wall in Manchester; 16 February at Backstage at The Green Hotel in Kinross; 17 February at Zeffirellis in Ambleside; 26 May 2023 at City Varieties Music Hall in Leeds) The band began touring again in November 2023 with dates booked until November 2024.

Co-founding member Mike Ratledge died on 5 February 2025. On 4 March 2025 in Manchester (at Band On The Wall), the band embarked on an 8-date UK Spring tour which concluded on 4 April in London (at The Vortex Jazz Club), celebrating on that occasion John Etheridge's 50 years with the band (since 12 April 1975). Soft Machine toured Europe from 9 May in London (at Signature Brew) to 25 May 2025 in Zoetermeer, The Netherlands (at De Boerderij): the 10-date Spring tour also included Sweden (four dates), Norway (one date), Finland (two dates) and Germany (one date). After a special show dedicated to Mike Ratledge on 1 September 2025 in London (at the Pizza Express jazz club), Soft Machine embarked on 2 November 2025 in Cardiff (at Acapela Studio) on an 8-date UK Fall tour which concluded on 30 November 2025 in Southampton (at 1865) (with Colosseum), also visiting Market Harborough, Barnard Castle, Hull, Bristol and London again (2 dates at Sound Lounge and at Cadogan Hall, again with Colosseum).

On 13 March 2026, the band released their thirteenth studio album, simply entitled Thirteen, which comprises thirteen original tracks.

== Musical style ==
Soft Machine's music encompasses progressive rock, experimental rock, jazz rock, jazz, proto-prog, psychedelic rock and art rock. The band are part of the Canterbury scene of progressive rock. According to Hugh Hopper: "We weren't consciously playing jazz rock, it was more a case of not wanting to sound like other bands; we certainly didn't want a guitarist".

== Members ==
=== Current ===
- John Etheridge – guitar (1975–1978, 1984, 2015–present)
- Theo Travis – saxophones, flutes, keyboards, piano (2015–present)
- Fred Thelonious Baker – bass (2020–present)
- Asaf Sirkis – drums (2022–present)

=== Former ===
- Mike Ratledge – keyboards, piano, organ, synthesizers, flute (1966–1976; died 2025)
- Robert Wyatt – drums, percussion, keyboards, lead and backing vocals (1966–1971)
- Kevin Ayers – bass, guitar, backing and lead vocals (1966–1968; died 2013)
- Daevid Allen – guitar, bass, backing vocals (1966–1967; died 2015)
- Larry Nowlin – guitar, backing vocals (1966)
- Andy Summers – guitar (1968)
- Hugh Hopper – bass, guitar, alto saxophone (1968–1973; died 2009)
- Brian Hopper – tenor and soprano saxophones (1969)
- Elton Dean – alto saxophone, saxello, flute, keyboards (1969–1972; died 2006)
- Lyn Dobson – tenor and soprano saxophones, flute, backing vocals (1969–1970)
- Mark Charig – cornet, trumpet (1969)
- Nick Evans – trombone (1969)
- Phil Howard – drums (1971–1972)
- John Marshall – drums, percussion (1972–1978, 1980–1981, 1984, 2015–2022; died 2023)
- Karl Jenkins – baritone and soprano saxophones, recorder, flute, oboe, keyboards, piano, synthesizers (1972–1978, 1980–1981, 1984)
- Roy Babbington – bass (1973–1976, 2015–2020)
- Allan Holdsworth – guitars, violin, voices (1973–1975, 1978, 1980–1981; substitute for Etheridge at one show in 1977; died 2017)
- Alan Wakeman – tenor and soprano saxophones (1976)
- Ray Warleigh – alto saxophone, flute (1976, 1980–1981, 1984; died 2015)
- Ric Sanders – violin, keyboards (1976–1978)
- Percy Jones – bass (1976)
- Steve Cook – bass (1976–1978)
- Jack Bruce – bass (1980–1981; died 2014)
- Stu Calver – vocals (1980–1981; died 2000)
- Dick Morrissey – tenor saxophone (1980–1981; died 2000)
- John Perry – vocals (1980–1981)
- Tony Rivers – vocals (1980–1981; died 2026)
- Alan Parker – guitar (1980–1981)
- John Taylor – piano (1980–1981; died 2015)
- Paul Carmichael – bass (1984)
- Dave MacRae – keyboards, piano (1984)

== Discography ==
=== Studio albums ===
- The Soft Machine (1968)
- Volume Two (1969)
- Third (1970)
- Fourth (1971)
- Fifth (1972)
- Six (1973)
- Seven (1973)
- Bundles (1975)
- Softs (1976)
- Land of Cockayne (1981)
- Hidden Details (2018)
- Other Doors (2023)
- Thirteen (2026)

=== Soft Machine Legacy studio albums ===
- Soft Machine Legacy (2006)
- Steam (2007)
- Burden of Proof (2013)

=== Soft Works studio albums ===
- Abracadabra (2003)

== Filmography ==
- Soft Machine Legacy: New Morning – The Paris Concert, available in DVD format (2006)
- Alive in Paris 1970, available in DVD format (2008)
- Romantic Warriors III: Canterbury Tales, available in DVD format (2015)
- Stamping Ground(1971)
