= Elton Dean =

English jazz saxophonist (1945–2006)

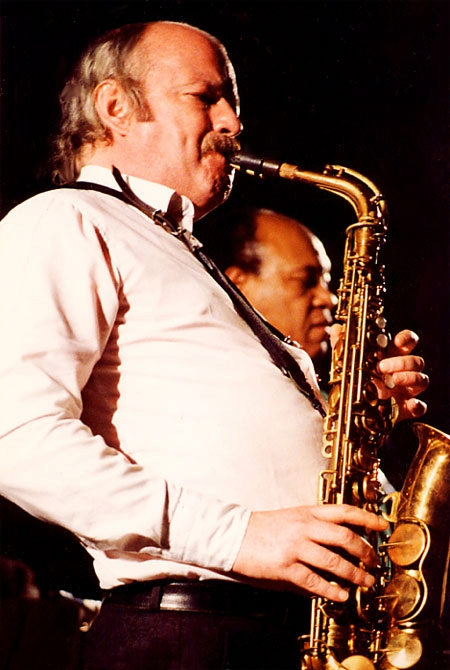

Background information
- Born: 28 October 1945; Nottingham, England
- Origin: Tooting, London, England
- Died: 8 February 2006 (aged 60) London, England
- Genres: Jazz; Free jazz; Progressive rock
- Occupations: Musician; songwriter; record producer
- Instruments: Saxophone; saxello; keyboards
- Years active: 1966–2006

Elton Dean (28 October 1945 – 8 February 2006) was an English jazz musician who performed on alto saxophone, saxello (a variant of the soprano saxophone) and occasionally keyboards. Part of the Canterbury scene, he featured in Soft Machine, among others.

== Life and career ==
Dean was born in Nottingham, England, moving to Tooting, London, soon after his birth. From 1966 to 1967, Dean was a member of the band Bluesology, led by Long John Baldry. The band's pianist, Reginald Dwight, afterward combined Dean's and Baldry's first names for his own stage name, Elton John. This fact is alluded to in the 2019 film Rocketman, a biopic of the life and career of Elton John, where Dean is portrayed by Evan Walsh. However, the film fictionally cites John Lennon as the inspiration for Elton John's taken surname.

Dean established his reputation as a member of the Keith Tippett Sextet from 1968 to 1970, and in the band Soft Machine from 1969 to 1972. Shortly before leaving Soft Machine he started his own group, Just Us.

From 1975 to 1978 he led a nine-piece band called Ninesense, performing at the Bracknell Jazz Festival and similar events. Following this, his own groups were usually quartets or quintets, and most often worked in the free jazz mode, with little or no pre-composed material, such as Soft Heap with Mark Hewins. However, he also continued to work with other groups that were very composition-based, such as guitarist Phil Miller's In Cahoots, drummer Pip Pyle's Equipe Out, and various projects with former Soft Machine bassist Hugh Hopper.

In 2002, Dean and three other former Soft Machine members (Hugh Hopper, drummer John Marshall, and guitarist Allan Holdsworth) toured and recorded under the name Soft Works. With another former Soft Machine member, guitarist John Etheridge, replacing Holdsworth, they subsequently toured and recorded as Soft Machine Legacy, playing some pieces from the original Soft Machine repertoire as well as new works. Featuring Dean, three albums of the Legacy have been released: Live in Zaandam (CD, rec. 2005/05/10), New Morning – The Paris Concert (DVD, rec. 2005/12/12) and the studio album Soft Machine Legacy (CD, 2006, rec. 2005).

Dean's last musical collaborations also included those with Soft Bounds, a quartet composed of Dean, Hugh Hopper, Sophia Domancich and Simon Goubert, and also with Alex Maguire's project Psychic Warrior.

Dean died on 8 February 2006 after more than a year of heart and liver problems. He was replaced in Soft Machine Legacy by Theo Travis.

== Discography ==
=== As leader ===
- 1971: Elton Dean (reissued as Just Us)
- 1975: Live at the BBC (with Ninesense, released 2003)
- 1976: Oh! For The Edge
- 1976: They All Be on This Old Road (live)
- 1977: Happy Daze (live)
- 1979: Three's Company Two's A Crowd
- 1979: The 100 Club Concert (released posthumously in 2012)
- 1980: Boundaries
- 1985: The Bologna Tape
- 1986: Welcomet
- 1988: Duos (cassette only)
- 1988: Trios (cassette only)
- 1989: EDQ Live (cassette only)
- 1989: Unlimited Saxophone Company
- 1990: Vortex Tapes (live)
- 1995: Silent Knowledge
- 1997: Headless Quartet
- 1997: Newsense
- 1998: Moorsong
- 2000: QED
- 2002: Sea of Infinity
- 2022: On Italian Roads (Live at Teatro Cristallo, Milan, 1979)
- 2023: Seven For Lee Variations: On Italian Roads, Vol. 2

=== Collaborations ===
- 1976: Dean, Hopper, Tippett, Gallivan: Cruel But Fair
- 1977: Dean, Skidmore: El Skid
- 1977: Dean, Wheeler, Gallivan: The Cheque Is in the Mail
- 1977: Dean, Hopper, Tippett, Gallivan: Mercy Dash
- 1985: Dean, Miller: Steve Miller Trio Meets Elton Dean
- 1990: Dean, Howard Riley Quartet: All The Tradition
- 1992: Dean, Hewins: Bar Torque
- 1993: Dean, Riley: One Two One
- 1995: Dean, Dunmall: If Dubois Only Knew
- 1995: Dean, Riley: Descending Circles
- 1996: Dean, Rudd: Rumours of an Incident
- 1996: Dean, Cuomo: The Origin of Man
- 1997: Dean, Hopper, Clarke, Knight: The Mind in the Trees
- 1998: Dean, Bellatalla, Sanders: Into The Nierika
- 2000: Dean, Trovesi: Freedom in Jazz
- 2004: Dean, Domancich: Avant
- 2004: Dean, Dunmall, Rogers, Blanco: Remembrance (released posthumously in 2013)
- 2005: Dean, Wilkinson, Bianco: Freebeat – Northern Lights
- 2007: Dean, The Wrong Object: The Unbelievable Truth (recorded live in Paris at Glaz'Art on 18 October 2005)

=== Bands ===
with Soft Machine (see Soft Machine discography for live albums)

- 1970: Third
- 1971: Fourth
- 1972: Fifth

Other bands

- 1971: Centipede: Septober Energy
- 1978: Soft Head: Rogue Element
- 1979: Soft Heap: Al Dente (live)
- 1979: Soft Heap: Soft Heap
- 1983: Soft Heap: A Veritable Centaur
- 1985: Pip Pyle's Equip' Out: L'Equipe Out
- 1989: In Cahoots: Live 86–89
- 1990: Anglo Italian Quartet: Put It Right Mr. Smoothie
- 1990: l'Equip' Out: Up!
- 1995: British Saxophone Quartet: Early October
- 1995: Anglo Italian Quartet: Twice Upon A Time
- 2002: Soft Works: Abracadabra
- 2003: Soft Mountain: Soft Mountain
- 2004: Soft Bounds: Live at Le Triton
- 2005: Soft Machine Legacy: Live in Zaandam
- 2006: Soft Machine Legacy: Soft Machine Legacy
- 2024: Supersister (Dutch band): The Elton Dean Sessions

=== Appearances ===
- 1969: Julie Driscoll: 1969
- 1970: Keith Tippett: You Are Here... I Am There
- 1970: Kevin Ayers: BBC Sessions 1970-1976
- 1970: Robert Wyatt: The End of an Ear
- 1971: Keith Tippett: Dedicated To You, But You Weren't Listening
- 1971: Heads Hands & Feet: Heads Hands & Feet
- 1971: Reg King: Reg King
- 1972: Mike Hugg: Somewhere
- 1973: Alexis Korner: Alexis Korner
- 1973: Mike Hugg: Stress & Strain
- 1974: Hugh Hopper: Monster Band
- 1975: Brotherhood of Breath: Bremen to Bridgwater
- 1975: Dudu Pukwana: Diamond Express
- 1975: Julie Tippetts: Sunset Glow
- 1976: Hugh Hopper: Hoppertunity Box
- 1976: Intercontinental Express: London
- 1978: Keith Tippett: Frames
- 1978: Carla Bley Band: European Tour 1977
- 1979: John Stevens Dance Orchestra: A Luta Continua
- 1981: National Health: DS Al Coda
- 1984: Keith Tippett: A Loose Kite in a Gentle Wind...
- 1984: The Big Team: Under The Influence
- 1985: Phil Miller: Cutting Both Ways
- 1985: Harry Beckett: Pictures of You
- 1987: Dennis Gonzalez Dallas-London Sextet: Catechism
- 1988: Phil Miller: Split Seconds
- 1991: Joe Gallivan's Soldiers of the Road: Innocence
- 1994: John Greaves: Songs
- 1996: MASHU: Elephants in your head?
- 1999: Roswell Rudd: Broad Strokes
- 2003: Psychic Warrior: Psychic Warrior
- 2003: Carol Grimes: Mother
- 2003: Hugh Hopper: Jazzloops
- 2003: In Cahoots: All That
- 2005: The Wrong Object featuring Elton Dean: The Unbelievable Truth
