= Mike Ratledge =

British keyboardist and flutist (1943–2025)

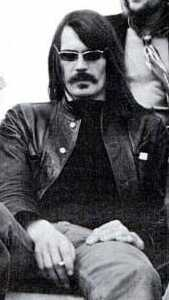
- Ratledge with Soft Machine in 1970

Background information
- Born: Michael Ronald Ratledge; 6 May 1943; Maidstone, Kent, England
- Died: 5 February 2025 (aged 81)
- Genres: Psychedelic rock; progressive rock; Canterbury scene; jazz rock; new-age
- Occupation: Musician
- Instruments: Keyboards; flute
- Years active: 1963–2000s
- Labels: ABC Probe; Columbia; Harvest
- Formerly of: Soft Machine
- Spouse: Marsha Hunt (m. 1967)

Michael Ronald Ratledge (6 May 1943 – 5 February 2025) was a British musician. A part of the Canterbury scene, he was a founding member of Soft Machine. He was the last founding member to leave the group, doing so in 1976.

== Early life ==
Ratledge was born in Maidstone, Kent, the son of a Canterbury secondary modern school headmaster. As a child, he was educated in classical music, the only kind of music played in his parents' home. He learned to play the piano, and with his friend Brian Hopper, whom he had met at Simon Langton Grammar School for Boys in Canterbury, played classical piano and clarinet pieces.

Ratledge also met Brian's younger brother Hugh, and Robert Wyatt. In 1961, he met Daevid Allen, who interested them in playing jazz. Through Cecil Taylor's piano pieces Ratledge became familiar with the music of Thelonious Monk, Miles Davis and John Coltrane. In 1963, he played in the Daevid Allen Trio. Unlike his friends, Ratledge wanted to further his education, and studied at University College, Oxford on a scholarship, where he earned a degree in psychology and philosophy. He won a college prize in philosophy.

At the same time, Ratledge attended music lessons, and was educated by avant-garde musicians Mal Dean and Rab Spall. After his graduation, Ratledge intended to pursue American poetry at university in the United States, but his application for a scholarship was filed too late.

== Career ==
In 1966, Ratledge's friends were forming a new band, Soft Machine, and asked him to join. The band included Robert Wyatt, Daevid Allen, and Kevin Ayers. There were many personnel changes over the years. Wyatt's departure in 1971 left Ratledge as the only remaining founding member, while the 1973 departure of Hugh Hopper (who joined in 1968) left Ratledge as the only member from the 1960s to still be in the band.

In November 1973, Ratledge participated in a live performance of Mike Oldfield's Tubular Bells for the BBC. In 1976, Ratledge decided to leave Soft Machine to build a solo career, leaving the band under Karl Jenkins' leadership. Ratledge built himself a studio and composed a score for the film Riddles of the Sphinx, which utilised a prototype synthesizer which he constructed with his friend Denys Irving.

As Soft Machine's longest-lasting member, Ratledge was a part of the band's changes in musical direction from psychedelic music to jazz-rock. In the 1980s, Ratledge was active as a composer and musical producer for commercials and the theatre. In 1995, Adiemus (Ratledge, Karl Jenkins and Miriam Stockley) released Songs of Sanctuary, which Ratledge co-produced with Karl Jenkins and for which he programmed the electronic percussion.

== Personal life and death ==
Ratledge married Marsha Hunt on 15 April 1967. On 5 February 2025, Ratledge died after a short illness. He was 81. John Etheridge announced his death on Facebook.

== Discography ==
Year	Album	Artist
1963	Live 1963	Daevid Allen Trio
1964–68	Canterburied Sounds Vols. 1-3	Various artists
1967-68	The Wilde Flowers	Wilde Flowers
1969	Joy of a Toy	Kevin Ayers
1970	The Madcap Laughs	Syd Barrett
1971	Just Us	Elton Dean & Just Us
1972	Bananamour	Kevin Ayers
1974	The Confessions of Dr. Dream and Other Stories	Kevin Ayers
1977	Instructions For Angels	David Bedford
1978	Planet Earth	Planet Earth
1978	Star Clusters Nebulae & Places in Devon / The Song of the White Horse	David Bedford
1979	Push Button	Rubba
1980	Wonderin'	Rollercoaster
1981	Cuts for Commercials Vol. 3	Karl Jenkins & Mike Ratledge
1981	For Christmas, for Children	Karl Jenkins & Mike Ratledge
1982	Crystal Gazing (unreleased soundtrack)	Mike Ratledge
1983	The Bad Sister (unreleased soundtrack)	Mike Ratledge
1995	Adiemus: Songs of Sanctuary	Karl Jenkins
2010	Movement	Karl Jenkins & Mike Ratledge
2010	Some Shufflin'	Karl Jenkins & Mike Ratledge
2013	Riddles of the Sphinx (soundtrack recorded in 1977)	Mike Ratledge
