= List of Soft Machine and spin-off band members =

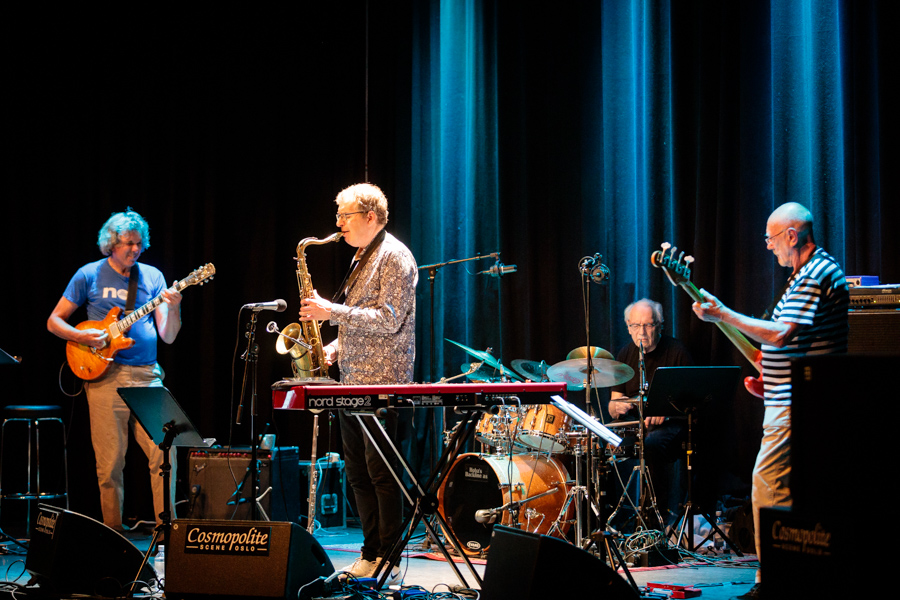
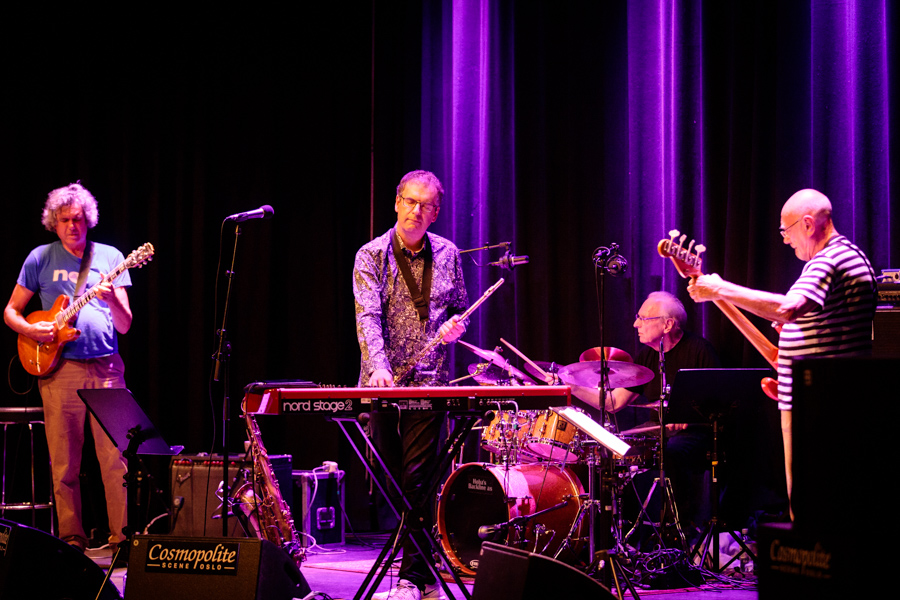
Soft Machine performing live in 2018.

Soft Machine are an English jazz-rock band from Canterbury. Formed in mid-1966, the group originally consisted of drummer and vocalist Robert Wyatt, guitarists Daevid Allen and Larry Nowlin, bassist and vocalist Kevin Ayers, and keyboardist Mike Ratledge. The current lineup of the band features guitarist John Etheridge (1975–1978, 1984 and since 2015), saxophonist, keyboardist Theo Travis (since 2015), bassist Fred Baker (since 2020) and drummer Asaf Sirkis (since 2022).

== History ==
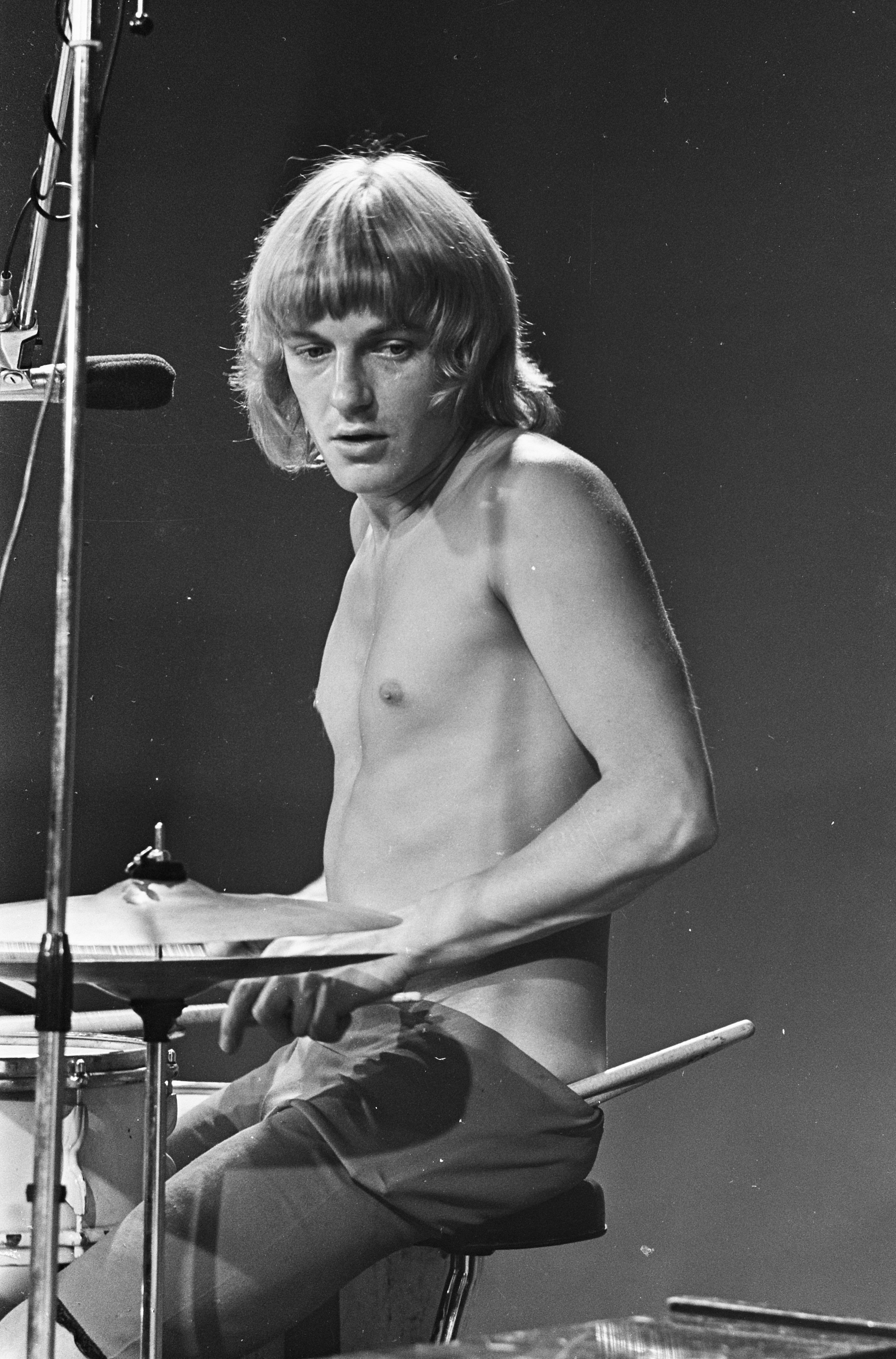
Original drummer Robert Wyatt was the first and only lead vocalist for Soft Machine. After his departure in 1971, the group became entirely instrumental.

=== Original run ===
Soft Machine were formed in mid-1966 by drummer and vocalist Robert Wyatt, guitarists Daevid Allen and Larry Nowlin, bassist and vocalist Kevin Ayers and keyboardist Mike Ratledge. Wyatt, Allen and Ratledge had first worked together in 1963 as the Daevid Allen Trio, after which Wyatt and Ayers co-founded the Wilde Flowers in late 1964 and Mister Head in early 1966, the latter with Allen and Nowlin. Mister Head was short-lived and in mid-1966 Wyatt, Ayers, Allen and Nowlin joined Ratledge to form Soft Machine. Nowlin's time with the band was brief, leaving less than two months after the band formed, reducing them to a quartet. Soft Machine released a single, "Love Makes Sweet Music", in February 1967. Six months later they were reduced to a trio, when Allen, an Australian, was denied re-entry to the UK following a tour of France, after overstaying his visa. Wyatt, Ayers and Ratledge recorded Soft Machine's self-titled debut album in April 1968, which was issued at the end of the year. After the album's completion, Andy Summers joined the band on guitar, though he left after just two months returning the band to a trio. After a final American tour, opening for the Jimi Hendrix Experience, Ayers left Soft Machine in September 1968.

Wyatt and Ratledge rebuilt Soft Machine in December 1968 with Hugh Hopper replacing Ayers on bass. Another former member of the Daevid Allen Trio and the Wilde Flowers, Hopper had previously guested on Soft Machine's debut album. This new lineup recorded Volume Two during early 1969, and eventually released in September that year. After guesting on the Volume Two sessions, Hopper's brother Brian Hopper, another Wilde Flowers founder, joined the band on saxophone in May 1969. After five months, Brian Hopper departed, with Wyatt, Ratledge and Hugh Hopper expanding the band to a septet with the addition of a four-piece horn section: saxophonists Elton Dean and Lyn Dobson, cornet player Mark Charig and trombonist Nick Evans. Both Charig and Evans left after two months due to "financial and logistical challenges", while Dobson also left the band in March 1970.

After the release and promotion of Third and Fourth, Wyatt was fired in August 1971. Wyatt's replacement was initially Australian drummer Phil Howard. However, after half of the next album Fifth was recorded, Howard himself was replaced by John Marshall. After Fifth was completed, Dean also left in mid-1972 and was replaced by Karl Jenkins, a former bandmate of Marshall's in Nucleus. The group issued Six the next year, which was Hopper's last album before departing in May 1973. He was replaced by Roy Babbington, another former Nucleus member who had previously worked with Soft Machine as a session musician, playing double bass on Fourth and Fifth. In November 1973, the group became a quintet again with the addition of Allan Holdsworth (another Nucleus alumnus) as their first guitarist in five years. This lineup recorded the album Bundles and managed to stay together until April 1975, when Holdsworth departed. He recommended John Etheridge as his replacement. At the beginning of 1976, saxophonist Alan Wakeman was added, at which point Jenkins stopped playing saxophone and oboe and focused solely on keyboards. In March 1976, the band were left with no original members when Ratledge chose to leave.

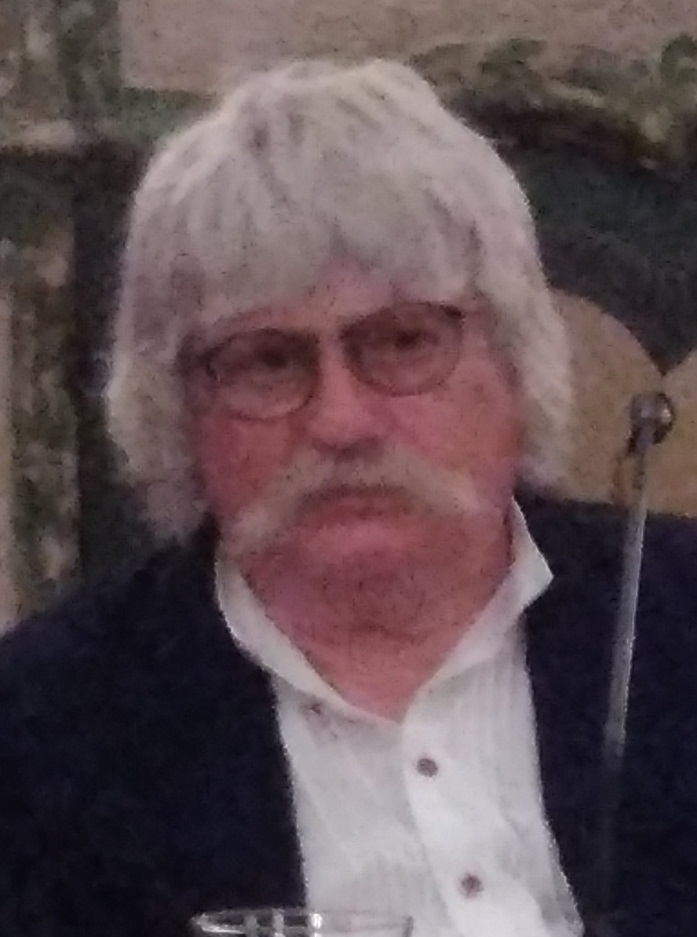
After Elton Dean's departure in 1972, he was replaced by Karl Jenkins (pictured) who would later become band leader.

After the release of Softs in 1976, Soft Machine's lineup continued to change regularly. Wakeman left in July, just after the album's release, and was replaced briefly by Ray Warleigh, who had worked with the band previously as a session player on Bundles. For a European tour later in the year, Ric Sanders joined on violin and Percy Jones of Brand X took over from Babbington, who had suddenly quit. Jones declined to join on a full-time basis and was replaced by Steve Cook. Live shows in 1977 spawned the band's first completely live release, Alive & Well: Recorded in Paris. After a final show in December 1978, as a quartet without Sanders and with Allan Holdsworth returning to replace Etheridge, Soft Machine disbanded and members went their separate ways.

=== Occasional reunions ===
The Soft Machine name was briefly revived in 1980 for Land of Cockayne. In the summer of 1984, Soft Machine reformed once again for a short run of shows at Ronnie Scott's Jazz Club, with the band comprising John Marshall, Karl Jenkins, Ray Warleigh, John Etheridge, Paul Carmichael and Dave MacRae.

=== Early spin-off bands ===
In 1978, former Soft Machine bassist Hugh Hopper and saxophonist Elton Dean formed the spin-off band Soft Heap, with former National Health keyboardist Alan Gowen and drummer Pip Pyle. For their first tour, Pyle was temporarily replaced by Dave Sheen due to other commitments, and the group (renamed Soft Head) issued the live album Rogue Element by the end of the year. With Pyle back on drums, the band recorded a self-titled debut album in late 1978, which was issued early the following year. National Health's John Greaves later replaced Hopper and guitarist Mark Hewins joined after Gowen's death in 1981, with this second incarnation recording the live album A Veritable Centaur released in 1995. A live album recorded by the original Soft Heap lineup of Hopper, Dean, Gowen and Pyle in 1978 was released as Al Dente in 2008.

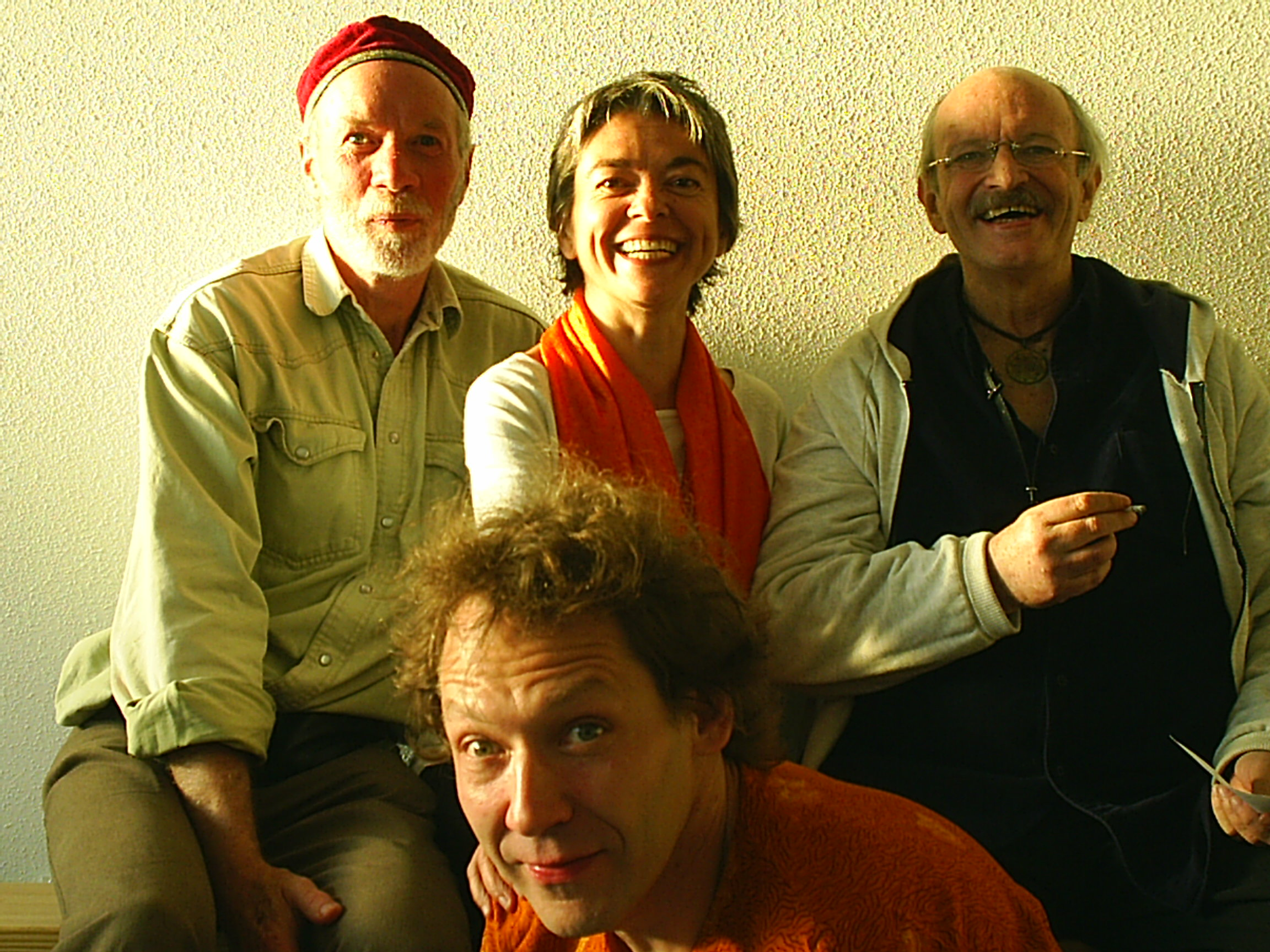
Hugh Hopper and Elton Dean formed a number of Soft Machine spin-off bands during the 1990s and 2000s, including Soft Bound (pictured).

=== Later spin-off bands ===
Over ten years after the last Soft Machine spin-off band, Hugh Hopper and Elton Dean formed Soft Ware in 1999, adding former Soft Machine drummer John Marshall and former King Crimson contributor Keith Tippett on keyboards. The group did not release any albums, and by 2002 had changed their name to Soft Works as Tippett left and former guitarist Allan Holdsworth joined. Abracadabra, the band's only studio album, was issued in 2003. Holdsworth left again after the album's release and was replaced in October 2004 by his original replacement in Soft Machine, John Etheridge; at this point, the band renamed themselves Soft Machine Legacy. During the final Soft Works tour, Hopper and Dean also recorded an album with Japanese keyboardist Hoppy Kamiyama and drummer Tatsuya Yoshida under the name Soft Mountain. In 2004, they completed a tour with French keyboardist Sophia Domancich and drummer Simon Goubert under the name Soft Bounds.

The first lineup of Soft Machine Legacy released Live at Zaandam in 2005, followed by a self-titled debut studio album and the live video New Morning: The Paris Concert the following year. On 7 February 2006, however, Dean died following a year of "heart and liver problems". His place in the band was taken by Theo Travis, and in January 2007 the group issued their second studio album Steam. In June 2008, Hopper was diagnosed with leukemia and temporarily replaced on tour by Fred Baker of In Cahoots. He later died of the condition on 7 June 2009. As had happened when Hopper left Soft Machine in 1973, his place was taken by Roy Babbington. In 2010, the band issued the live collection Live Adventures recorded in 2009, which was followed in 2013 by their third studio release Burden of Proof.

=== Soft Machine returns ===
Starting in December 2015, Theo Travis, John Etheridge, Roy Babbington and John Marshall began touring as Soft Machine, dropping "Legacy" from their name. The band released their first official studio album under the original name since 1981 in the form of Hidden Details in September 2018. In December 2020 Fred Baker replaced Babbington. In August 2022, Asaf Sirkis replaced newly retired John Marshall. A new studio album, Other Doors, was released in June 2023. The album was recorded with Marshall before his departure.

== Soft Machine members ==
=== Current members ===
Image	Name	Years active	Instruments	Soft Machine release contributions
	John Etheridge	1975–1978; 1984; 2015–present	guitars	Softs (1976); Alive & Well: Recorded in Paris (1978); British Tour '75 (2005); Hidden Details (2018); Live at the Baked Potato (2020); Other Doors (2023); "The Dew at Dawn" (2024)
	Theo Travis	2015–present	tenor and soprano saxophones; flute; keyboards; piano	Hidden Details (2018); Live at the Baked Potato (2020); Other Doors (2023); "The Dew at Dawn" (2024)
	Fred Baker	2020–present	bass	Other Doors (2023); "The Dew at Dawn" (2024)
	Asaf Sirkis	2022–present	drums	"The Dew at Dawn" (2024)

=== Former members ===
Image	Name	Years active	Instruments	Soft Machine release contributions
	Mike Ratledge	1966–1976 (session musician in 1977) (died 2025)	keyboards; organ; piano; synthesisers; flute	all releases from "Love Makes Sweet Music" (1967) to Alive & Well: Recorded in Paris (1978) (as session musician); all releases from Live at the Proms 1970 (1988) to Switzerland 1974 (2015); Facelift France & Holland (2022); The Dutch Lesson (2023); Høvikodden 1971 (2024)
	Robert Wyatt	1966–1971	drums; percussion; lead and backing vocals; occasional keyboards and bass	all releases from "Love Makes Sweet Music" (1967) to Fourth (1971); Jet Propelled Photographs (1972); Live at the Proms 1970 (1988); BBC in Concert 1971 (1993); all releases from Live at the Paradiso 1969 (1995) to BBC Radio: 1967–1971 (2003); Somewhere in Soho (2004); Breda Reactor (2004); Grides (2006); Middle Earth Masters (2006); Alive in Paris (2008); Facelift France & Holland (2022); Høvikodden 1971 (2024)
	Kevin Ayers	1966–1968 (died 2013)	bass; guitars; backing and lead vocals	"Love Makes Sweet Music" (1967); The Soft Machine (1968); Jet Propelled Photographs (1972); Soft Machine Turns On, Volumes 1 and 2 (2001); BBC Radio: 1967–1971 (2003); Middle Earth Masters (2006)
	Daevid Allen	1966–1967 (died 2015)	guitars; bass; backing vocals	"Love Makes Sweet Music" (1967); Jet Propelled Photographs (1972); Soft Machine Turns On, Volume 1 (2001)
	Larry Nowlin	1966	guitars; backing vocals	none – live performances only
	Andy Summers	1968	guitars	none – live performances only
	Hugh Hopper	1968–1973 (session musician earlier in 1968) (died 2009)	bass; guitars; alto saxophone (1968–69)	all releases from The Soft Machine (1968) (as session musician) to Fifth (1972); Six (1973); all releases from Live at the Proms 1970 (1988) to Noisette (2000) and Backwards (2002) to Breda Reactor (2004); Grides (2006); all releases from Alive in Paris (2008) to Drop (2009); Facelift France & Holland (2022); Høvikodden 1971 (2024)
	Brian Hopper	1969 (session musician earlier in 1969)	tenor and soprano saxophones	Volume Two (1969) (as session musician); Spaced (1996); BBC Radio: 1967–1971 (2003)
	Elton Dean	1969–1972 (died 2006)	alto saxophone; saxello; flute; keyboards	Third (1970); Fourth (1971); Fifth (1972); Live at the Proms 1970 (1988); BBC in Concert 1971 (1993); Live in France (1995); Virtually (1998); Noisette (2000); Backwards (2002); Facelift (2002); BBC Radio: 1967–1971 (2003); Somewhere in Soho (2004); Breda Reactor (2004); Grides (2006); Alive in Paris (2008); Drop (2009); Facelift France & Holland (2022); Høvikodden 1971 (2024)
	Lyn Dobson	1969–1970	tenor and soprano saxophones; flute; backing vocals	Third (1970); Live 1970 (1998); Noisette (2000); Backwards (2002); BBC Radio: 1967–1971 (2003); Breda Reactor (2004); Alive in Paris (2008); Facelift France & Holland (2022); Live in Europe 1970 (2024)
	Mark Charig	1969 (session musicians in 1970)	cornet; trumpet	Fourth (1971) (as session musician); BBC in Concert 1971 (1993) (as guest); Backwards (2002); BBC Radio: 1967–1971 (2003)
	Nick Evans	1969 (session musicians in 1970)	trombone	Third (1970) (as session musician); Fourth (1971) (as session musician); Backwards (2002); BBC Radio: 1967–1971 (2003)
	Phil Howard	1971–1972	drums	Fifth (1972); BBC in Concert 1971 (1993) (as guest); BBC Radio: 1971–1974 (2003); Drop (2009)
	John Marshall	1972–1978; 1980–1981; 1984; 2015–2022 (died 2023)	drums; percussion	Fifth (1972); all releases from Six (1973) to Land of Cockayne (1981); BBC in Concert 1972 (1994); Live in France (1995); BBC Radio: 1971–1974 (2003); British Tour '75 (2005); Floating World Live (2006); all releases from NDR Jazz Workshop (2010) to Live at The Baked Potato (2020); The Dutch Lesson (2023); Other Doors (2023)
	Karl Jenkins	1972–1978; 1980–1981; 1984	baritone and soprano saxophones; recorder; flute; oboe; keyboards; piano; synthesisers	all releases from Six (1973) to Land of Cockayne (1981); BBC in Concert 1972 (1994); BBC Radio: 1971–1974 (2003); British Tour '75 (2005); Floating World Live (2006); NDR Jazz Workshop (2010); Switzerland 1974 (2015); The Dutch Lesson (2023)
	Roy Babbington	1973–1976; 2015–2020 (session musician 1970–1972 and 2022)	bass; double bass	Fourth (1971) (as session musician); Fifth (1972) (as session musician); Seven (1973); Bundles (1975); Softs (1976); BBC in Concert 1971 (1993) (as guest); BBC Radio: 1971–1974 (2003); British Tour '75 (2005); Floating World Live (2006); all releases from NDR Jazz Workshop (2010) to Live at the Baked Potato (2020); The Dutch Lesson (2023); Other Doors (2023) (as session musician)
	Allan Holdsworth	1973–1975; 1978; 1980–1981; (substitute for Etheridge at one show in 1977) (died 2017)	guitars; voices	Bundles (1975); Land of Cockayne (1981); BBC Radio: 1971–1974 (2003); Floating World Live (2006); Switzerland 1974 (2015)
	Alan Wakeman	1976	tenor and soprano saxophones	Softs (1976)
	Ray Warleigh	1976; 1980–1981; 1984 (session musician in 1974) (died 2015)	alto saxophone; flute; bass flute	Bundles (1975) (as session musician); Land of Cockayne (1981)
	Ric Sanders	1976–1978	violin	Alive & Well: Recorded in Paris (1978)
	Percy Jones	1976	bass	none – live performances only
	Steve Cook	1976–1978	bass	Alive & Well: Recorded in Paris (1978)
	Jack Bruce	1980–1981 (died 2014)	bass	Land Of Cockayne (1981)
	Dick Morrissey	1980–1981 (both died 2000)	tenor saxophone	Land Of Cockayne (1981)
	Stu Calver	1980–1981 (both died 2000)	vocals	Land Of Cockayne (1981)
	John Perry	1980–1981	vocals	Land Of Cockayne (1981)
	Tony Rivers	1980–1981	vocals	Land Of Cockayne (1981)
	Alan Parker	1980–1981	rhythm guitar	Land Of Cockayne (1981)
	John Taylor	1980–1981 (died 2015)	electric piano	Land Of Cockayne (1981)
	Paul Carmichael	1984	bass	none – live performances only
	Dave MacRae	1984	keyboards; piano	none – live performances only

== Other Soft Machine musicians ==
=== Touring substitutes ===
Image	Name	Years active	Instruments	Details
	Nic France	2017; 2022	drums	In 2017 and 2022, France filled in for John Marshall at a few shows, after the regular drummer injured his back.
	Gary Husband	2018	drums	Husband substituted for Marshall on drums for a few gigs in 2018

=== Session musicians ===
Image	Name	Years active	Instruments	Release contributions
	The Cake	1968	backing vocals	The Soft Machine (1968)
	Rab Spall	1970	violin	Third (1970)
	Jimmy Hastings	1970	flutes; bass clarinet	Third (1970); Fourth (1971)
	Alan Skidmore	1970	tenor saxophone	Fourth (1971)
	Nick Utteridge	2017	wind chimes	Hidden Details (2018)

== Spin-off band members ==
Image	Name	Years active	Instruments	Release contributions
	Elton Dean	1978–1988; 1999–2006 (until his death)	alto saxophone; saxello; piano	all Soft Machine spin-off band releases from Rogue Element (1978) to New Morning: The Paris Concert (2006)
	Pip Pyle	1978–1988 (died 2006)	drums; electronic drums	Soft Heap (1979); A Veritable Centaur (1995); Al Dente (2008)
	Alan Gowen	1978–1981 (until his death)	keyboards; synthesisers	Rogue Element (1978); Soft Heap (1979); Al Dente (2008)
	Hugh Hopper	1978–1979; 1999–2009 (touring hiatus from 2008–2009; his death)	bass	all Soft Machine spin-off band releases from Rogue Element (1978) to Al Dente (2008), except A Veritable Centaur (1995)
	Dave Sheen	1978 (touring)	drums	Rogue Element (1978)
	John Greaves	1979–1988	bass; vocals; keyboards	A Veritable Centaur (1995)
	Mark Hewins	1981–1988	guitar; vocals	A Veritable Centaur (1995)
	John Marshall	1999–2015 (died 2023)	drums; percussion	all Soft Works and Soft Machine Legacy releases
	Keith Tippett	1999–2002 (touring 2015) (died 2020)	keyboards; synthesisers	none – live performances only
	Allan Holdsworth	2002–2004	guitars; SynthAxe	Abracadabra (2003)
	Hoppy Kamiyama	2003 (Soft Mountain)	keyboards	Soft Mountain (2007)
	Tatsuya Yoshida	2003 (Soft Mountain)	drums	Soft Mountain (2007)
	Sophia Domancich	2003–2004 (Soft Bounds)	keyboards; piano	Live at Le Triton 2004 (2005)
	Simon Goubert	2003–2004 (Soft Bounds)	drums	Live at Le Triton 2004 (2005)
	John Etheridge	2004–2015	guitars	all Soft Machine Legacy releases
	Theo Travis	2006–2015	tenor and soprano saxophones; flute; keyboards; piano	Steam (2007); Live Adventures (2010); Burden of Proof (2013)
	Fred Baker	2008–2009 (Note: Baker replaced regular bassist Hugh Hopper between his 2008 leukemia diagnosis and his death in 2009.) (touring)	bass	none
	Roy Babbington	2009–2015	bass	Live Adventures (2010); Burden of Proof (2013)

== Other spin-off band musicians ==
=== Touring substitutes ===
Image	Name	Years active	Instruments	Details
	Liam Genockey	2004–2005	drums	Genockey and Fletcher substituted for the injured John Marshall at shows in October 2004 and summer 2005.
	Mark Fletcher	2005	drums	Genockey and Fletcher substituted for the injured John Marshall at shows in October 2004 and summer 2005.
	Nic France	2015	drums	During 2015, France and Husband filled in for John Marshall for several shows, after the regular drummer injured his back.
	Gary Husband	2015	drums	During 2015, France and Husband filled in for John Marshall for several shows, after the regular drummer injured his back.

=== Session musicians ===
Image	Name	Years active	Instruments	Release contributions
	Alain Eckert	1982–1983	guitar synthesizer	A Veritable Centaur (1995)

== Soft Machine lineups ==
Period	Members	Releases
August – September 1966	Mike Ratledge – keyboards, piano, flute; Robert Wyatt – drums, percussion, vocals; Kevin Ayers – bass, vocals, guitar; Daevid Allen – guitar, backing vocals, bass; Larry Nowlin – guitar, backing vocals	none
September 1966 – August 1967	Mike Ratledge – keyboards, piano, flute; Robert Wyatt – drums, percussion, vocals; Kevin Ayers – bass, vocals, guitar; Daevid Allen – guitar, backing vocals, bass	"Love Makes Sweet Music" (1967); Jet Propelled Photographs (1972); Soft Machine Turns On, Volume 1 (2001) – four tracks
August 1967 – May 1968	Mike Ratledge – keyboards, piano, flute; Robert Wyatt – drums, percussion, vocals; Kevin Ayers – bass, guitar, vocals	The Soft Machine (1968); Soft Machine Turns On, Volume 1 (2001) – eleven tracks; Soft Machine Turns On, Volume 2 (2001) – six tracks; BBC Radio: 1967–1971 (2003) – five tracks; Middle Earth Masters (2006)
May – July 1968	Mike Ratledge – keyboards, piano, flute; Robert Wyatt – drums, percussion, vocals; Kevin Ayers – bass, vocals, guitar; Andy Summers – guitar	none
July – September 1968	Mike Ratledge – keyboards, piano, flute; Robert Wyatt – drums, percussion, vocals; Kevin Ayers – bass, guitar, vocals	Soft Machine Turns On, Volume 2 (2001) – eight tracks
December 1968 – May 1969	Mike Ratledge – keyboards, piano, flute; Robert Wyatt – drums, percussion, vocals; Hugh Hopper – bass, guitar, saxophone	Volume Two (1969); Live at the Paradiso 1969 (1995)
May – October 1969	Mike Ratledge – keyboards, piano; Robert Wyatt – drums, percussion, vocals; Hugh Hopper – bass; Brian Hopper – saxophone	The Peel Sessions (1990) – two tracks; Spaced (1996); BBC Radio: 1967–1971 (2003) – two tracks
October – December 1969	Mike Ratledge – keyboards, piano; Robert Wyatt – drums, percussion, vocals; Hugh Hopper – bass; Elton Dean – saxophone, saxello, keyboards; Lyn Dobson – saxophone, flute; Mark Charig – cornet, trumpet; Nick Evans – trombone	The Peel Sessions (1990) – two tracks; Backwards (2002) – two tracks; BBC Radio: 1967–1971 (2003) – one track
December 1969 – March 1970	Mike Ratledge – keyboards, piano; Robert Wyatt – drums, percussion, vocals; Hugh Hopper – bass; Elton Dean – saxophone, saxello, keyboards; Lyn Dobson – saxophone, flute	Third (1970) – one track; Noisette (2000); Breda Reactor (2004); Alive in Paris 1970 (2008); Facelift France & Holland (2022)
March 1970 – August 1971	Mike Ratledge – keyboards, piano; Robert Wyatt – drums, percussion, vocals; Hugh Hopper – bass; Elton Dean – saxophone, saxello, keyboards	Third (1970) – three tracks; Fourth (1971); Live at the Proms 1970 (1988); The Peel Sessions (1990) – four tracks; BBC in Concert 1971 (1993); Virtually (1998); Backwards (2002) – three tracks; Facelift (2002); BBC Radio: 1967–1971 (2003) – five tracks; Somewhere in Soho (2004); Grides (2006); Live at Henie Onstad Art Centre 1971 (2009); Høvikodden 1971 (2024)
August 1971 – January 1972	Mike Ratledge – keyboards, piano; Hugh Hopper – bass; Elton Dean – saxophone, saxello, keyboards; Phil Howard – drums	Fifth (1972) – three tracks; The Peel Sessions (1990) – two tracks; BBC Radio: 1971–1974 (2003) – three tracks; Drop (2009)
January – May 1972	Mike Ratledge – keyboards, piano; Hugh Hopper – bass; Elton Dean – saxophone, saxello, keyboards; John Marshall – drums, percussion	Fifth (1972) – four tracks; Live in France (1995)
May 1972 – May 1973	Mike Ratledge – keyboards, piano; Hugh Hopper – bass; John Marshall – drums, percussion; Karl Jenkins – saxophone, keyboards	Six (1973); BBC in Concert 1972 (1994); BBC Radio: 1971–1974 (2003) – one track
May – November 1973	Mike Ratledge – keyboards, synthesisers; John Marshall – drums, percussion; Karl Jenkins – saxophone, keyboards; Roy Babbington – bass, double bass	Seven (1973); BBC Radio: 1971–1974 (2003) – four tracks; NDR Jazz Workshop (2010); The Dutch Lesson (2023)
November 1973 – April 1975	Mike Ratledge – keyboards, synthesisers; John Marshall – drums, percussion; Karl Jenkins – saxophone, keyboards; Roy Babbington – bass; Allan Holdsworth – guitar	Bundles (1975); BBC Radio: 1971–1974 (2003) – three tracks; Floating World Live (2006); Switzerland 1974 (2015)
April 1975 – January 1976	Mike Ratledge – keyboards, synthesisers; John Marshall – drums, percussion; Karl Jenkins – saxophone, keyboards; Roy Babbington – bass; John Etheridge – guitar	British Tour '75 (2005)
January – March 1976	Mike Ratledge – keyboards, synthesisers; John Marshall – drums, percussion; Karl Jenkins – keyboards, synthesisers; Roy Babbington – bass; John Etheridge – guitar; Alan Wakeman – saxophone	Softs (1976) – two tracks
March – June 1976	John Marshall – drums, percussion; Karl Jenkins – keyboards, synthesisers; Roy Babbington – bass; John Etheridge – guitar; Alan Wakeman – saxophone	Softs (1976) – nine tracks; Rubber Riff (1976) – Karl Jenkins solo album recorded during this period (with Marshall, Babbington and Etheridge guesting), re-released in 1994 under Soft Machine name
June – September 1976	John Marshall – drums, percussion; Karl Jenkins – keyboards, synthesisers; Roy Babbington – bass; John Etheridge – guitar; Ray Warleigh – saxophone, flute	none
September – November 1976	John Marshall – drums, percussion; Karl Jenkins – keyboards, synthesisers; John Etheridge – guitar; Ric Sanders – violin; Percy Jones – bass	none
November 1976 – March 1978	John Marshall – drums, percussion; Karl Jenkins – keyboards, synthesisers; John Etheridge – guitar; Ric Sanders – violin; Steve Cook – bass	Alive & Well: Recorded in Paris (1978)
December 1978	John Marshall – drums, percussion; Karl Jenkins – keyboards, synthesisers; Steve Cook – bass; Allan Holdsworth – guitar	none
Band inactive January 1979 – May 1980
June 1980 – March 1981	John Marshall – drums, percussion; Karl Jenkins – keyboards, synthesisers; Allan Holdsworth – guitar; Ray Warleigh – saxophone, flute; Jack Bruce – bass; Stu Calver – vocals; Dick Morrissey – saxophone; Alan Parker – guitar; John Perry – vocals; Tony Rivers – vocals; John Taylor – piano	Land of Cockayne (1981)
Band inactive April 1981 – June 1984
July – August 1984	John Marshall – drums, percussion; Karl Jenkins – keyboards, synthesisers; Ray Warleigh – saxophone, flute; John Etheridge – guitar; Paul Carmichael – bass; Dave MacRae – keyboards, piano	none
Band inactive September 1984 – November 2015
December 2015 – December 2020	John Marshall – drums, percussion; John Etheridge – guitar; Roy Babbington – bass; Theo Travis – saxophone, flute, keyboards	Hidden Details (2018); Live at the Baked Potato (2020)
December 2020 – August 2022	John Marshall – drums, percussion; John Etheridge – guitar; Theo Travis – saxophone, flute, keyboards; Fred Baker – bass	Other Doors (2023)
August 2022 – present	John Etheridge – guitar; Theo Travis – saxophone, flute, keyboards; Fred Baker – bass; Asaf Sirkis – drums	"The Dew at Dawn" (2024); Thirteen (2026)

== Spin-off band lineups ==
Period	Members	Releases
Soft Heap (1978–1979)	Elton Dean – saxophone, saxello; Hugh Hopper – bass; Alan Gowen – keyboards, synthesisers; Pip Pyle – drums	Soft Heap (1979); Al Dente (2008)
Soft Head (April – August 1978)	Elton Dean – saxophone, saxello; Hugh Hopper – bass; Alan Gowen – keyboards, synthesisers; Dave Sheen – drums	Rogue Element (1978)
Soft Heap (1979–1981)	John Greaves – bass, vocals; Elton Dean – saxophone, saxello; Alan Gowen – keyboards, synthesisers; Pip Pyle – drums	none
Soft Heap (1981–1988)	John Greaves – bass, keyboards, vocals; Mark Hewins – guitar, vocals; Elton Dean – saxophone, saxello; Pip Pyle – drums	A Veritable Centaur (1995)
Spin-off bands inactive 1988–1999
Soft Ware (September 1999 – June 2002)	Elton Dean – saxophone, saxello, keyboards; Hugh Hopper – bass; Keith Tippett – keyboards, synthesisers; John Marshall – drums	none
Soft Works (June 2002 – October 2004)	Elton Dean – saxophone, saxello, keyboards; Allan Holdsworth – guitar, synthesisers; Hugh Hopper – bass; John Marshall – drums, percussion	Abracadabra (2003)
Soft Mountain (August 2003)	Elton Dean – saxophone, saxello; Hugh Hopper – bass; Hoppy Kamiyama – keyboards; Tatsuya Yoshida – drums	Soft Mountain (2007)
Soft Bounds (2003–2004)	Elton Dean – saxophone, saxello; Hugh Hopper – bass; Sophia Domancich – keyboards, piano; Simon Goubert – drums	Live at Le Triton 2004 (2005)
Soft Machine Legacy (October 2004 – February 2006)	Elton Dean – saxophone, saxello, keyboards; John Etheridge – guitar; Hugh Hopper – bass; John Marshall – drums, percussion	Live in Zaandam (2005); Soft Machine Legacy (2006); New Morning: The Paris Concert (2006)
Soft Machine Legacy (March 2006 – June 2009)	Theo Travis – saxophone, flute, keyboards; John Etheridge – guitar; Hugh Hopper – bass; John Marshall – drums, percussion	Steam (2007)
Soft Machine Legacy (July 2009 – December 2015)	Theo Travis – saxophone, flute, keyboards; John Etheridge – guitar; Roy Babbington – bass; John Marshall – drums, percussion	Live Adventures (2010); Burden of Proof (2013)
