= Huffin =

Song by Soft Machine

from the album Alive & Well: Recorded in Paris
- Released: 1978
- Recorded: Théâtre Le Palace, Paris, France, July 1977
- Genre: Jazz rock
- Length: 5:12
- Label: Harvest
- Composer: Karl Jenkins
- Producer: Soft Machine

"Huffin" is an instrumental song written by Karl Jenkins and performed by Soft Machine. It was only released as a live recording, on their album Alive & Well: Recorded in Paris (recorded July 1977, released 1978). It is the last section of a suite of seven connecting songs which comprise the first side of the album, and is preceded by a short song titled "Puffin" which serves as an introduction to "Huffin".

The song is notable for its structure, and its function as a grand climax to the suite. The main part of the song is a fast paced riff, a repeating pattern of notes that uses polyrhythms of high complexity. Although the riff fits into the song's 4/4 time signature, it is sufficiently complex that, in order to follow the music, most listeners will need to memorize the riff and perceive the timing by the pattern, ignoring the time signature. It is likely that the musicians had to do the same.

The riff is performed by all members of the group, playing the melody in unison, except for the violin played by Ric Sanders holding one high note. There are no other harmonies or counter-melodies; even the drummer beats out the notes of the melody. This is not too unusual for Soft Machine's music of this time, especially in the compositions of Karl Jenkins, and similar examples can be found throughout the album. Even in the group's earlier days, when it consisted of completely different personnel from the group that performs "Huffin", melody lines were often played by several instruments in unison, and the music sometimes experimented with deliberately unsynchronized unison (several instruments playing the same melody, but out of sync with each other, sometimes wandering several bars apart), as explored on "Hope for Happiness": the first track on their first album, and on "Virtually" from their Fourth album. The sound of unison playing was also simulated on several songs from their Seven album, by using a harmonizer to make one instrument sound like two, playing in unison. But rarely, if ever, have virtually all instruments limited themselves to playing one melody in unison.

After several repeats of the riff, the music switches into a one-chord 4/4 jam with John Etheridge playing the lead solo on guitar. The music switches between the two sections, but the riff is now reprised by just bass and drums, and Etheridge performs a virtuoso solo on top, which is particularly impressive if it is improvised, as it appears to be.

In the second half of the song, the riff appears again, but the solo is now performed by Ric Sanders on violin. Although Sanders solos against the riff, his playing does not follow the timing of the riff for the most part (although there are a few short instances where it does), and he mostly performs free-form, ad libbing outside of the music's timing.

About a minute from the end, the music suddenly switches to a new riff which also uses complex polyrhythms. The instrumentation is not as stringent as the first riff's, because in some parts, some instruments hold a sustained note while others continue the pattern. Aside from that, all instruments play the melody together, as was done for the first riff, including John Marshall furiously beating out the timing on drums and cymbals, bringing the music to a sustained climax. The song ends on a final note which holds while Sanders plays an ascending flourish on violin.

== Personnel ==
- John Marshall – drums, percussion
- Karl Jenkins – piano, electric keyboards, synthesizer
- John Etheridge – electric guitar
- Ric Sanders – violin (credited as Rick Sanders)
- Steve Cook – bass guitar
