= Dancin' Days =

Dancin' Days may refer to:

- Dancin' Days (2012 TV series), a Portuguese soap opera
- Dancin' Days (1978 TV series), a Brazilian telenovela

== See also ==
- Dancing Days, a song by Led Zeppelin
- Dancing Days (album), an album by Chris Leslie
