= Jon Davie =

British musician (born 1954)

Jon (Jonathan) Davie (born 1954) is a bass guitar player with British folk rock bands including Gryphon and Home Service. He was also, using the name John Thomas, a member of The Banned, a British power pop punk/new wave band in the late 1970s.

Born in Hampton, Middlesex, on 6 September 1954, Davie's professional career began when he joined Gryphon at the end of 1975, and played on the last studio album recorded by the band – Treason. He joined as Graeme Taylor and Malcolm Bennett left the group as part of a significant re-shuffle of personnel. Davie remained in touch with Taylor during the next three years or so and, following the split-up of Gryphon, was introduced to Taylor's fellow Albion Band alumnus Ric Sanders (now a long-established member of Fairport Convention) who wanted to form a new jazz-influenced band with a fellow ex-member of Soft Machine, John Etheridge. This led to the formation of 2nd Vision who recorded the album First Steps for Chrysalis records in 1980. Davie was touring Europe with Dave Bristow (keyboards) and Mickey Barker (drums) as part of a jazz trio employed by Yamaha to showcase their instruments when Taylor once again appeared on the scene and asked Davie if he would care to join Home Service. As a fan the Albion Band that included John Tams and Michael Gregory, the offer was eagerly accepted. This led to an extended period of live work, both touring and as a member of what became almost a 'house band' at the National Theatre in London, appearing in productions of Dispatches, The Mysteries and Don Quixote.

Davie has performed and recorded with a diverse range of other artists including Billy Connolly, Ivan Graziani, Andy Cronshaw, June Tabor, Martin Simpson, Gordon Giltrap, John Harle, Desmond Dekker, Michael Nyman, John B. Spencer, Rolf Harris, Mauricio Venegas (as a member of Quimantu) and John Williams. Current projects include recording a new Gryphon album, live work with the singer/composer/producer Sandy McLelland, completion of an album with Dave Lambert (Strawbs), Taylor and the violinist Tom Leary under the band name 'Zeus', and work on recently recovered live recordings of The Home Service. Several festival appearances were planned for The Home Service during summer 2011 and Davie was said to be making a one-off appearance with Quimantu in Brescia, Italy.
