= Alive & Well: Recorded in Paris =

Live album by Soft Machine
- Released: March 1978
- Recorded: 6–9 July 1977 at Théâtre Le Palace, Paris, France; July 1977 at Advision Studios, London, England (studio overdubs and "Soft Space")
- Genre: Jazz rock
- Length: 39:06; 94:36 (2010 reissue)
- Label: Harvest
- Producer: Soft Machine

Soft Machine chronology
Softs (1976)	Alive & Well: Recorded in Paris (1978)	Land of Cockayne (1981)

Professional ratings
Review scores
Source	Rating
AllMusic	3/5 stars

Alive & Well: Recorded in Paris is a (mostly) live album by the jazz rock band Soft Machine, released in 1978. It is their first album recorded entirely without any founding members of the band as official members, as Mike Ratledge left the group during recording of the previous album Softs, though Ratledge himself contributed to the electronic percussion programming on the album's sole studio track "Soft Space". It is also their first album since their debut not to include any wind instruments.

== Overview ==
As reported on the booklet of the 2010 edition, it was recorded almost entirely live, by The Manor Mobile recording engineer Alan Perkins, during a 4-night residency at Paris' Théâtre Le Palace in July 1977. Much of the album was later mixed and partially re-recorded in studio; the track "Soft Space" was completely re-recorded in studio and released as a single ("Soft Space" parts 1 and 2) in April 1978.

After the final performance recorded for the album, the band's van was broken into and burglarized. Among the items stolen was Etheridge's Gibson SG electric guitar he used during the shows.

== Track listing ==
All songs composed by Karl Jenkins except where indicated.

=== Side one ===
1. "White Kite" – 3:00
2. "Eos" – 1:22
3. "Odds Bullets and Blades Pt. I" – 2:18
4. "Odds Bullets and Blades Pt. II" – 2:33
5. "Song of the Sunbird" – 1:24
6. "Puffin" – 1:18
7. "Huffin" – 5:12

Note: on original LP pressings, the audience sounds after the end of "Huffin" continue into the runout groove.

=== Side two ===
1. "Number Three" (John Etheridge) – 2:25
2. "The Nodder" – 7:13
3. "Surrounding Silence" (Ric Sanders) – 4:04
4. "Soft Space" – 8:17

== 2010 Double-CD issue ==
=== CD 1 ===
1. "White Kite" – 3:00
2. "Eos" – 1:20
3. "Odds Bullets and Blades (Part I)" – 2:19
4. "Odds Bullets and Blades (Part II)" – 2:33
5. "Song of the Sunbird" – 1:25
6. "Puffin'" – 1:17
7. "Huffin'" – 4:42
8. "Number Three" (John Etheridge) – 2:26
9. "The Nodder" – 7:12
10. "Surrounding Silence" (Ric Sanders) – 4:05
11. "Soft Space" – 8:18

=== CD 2 ===
(all previously unreleased except tracks 9 & 10)

1. "K's Riff" – 4:41
2. "The Nodder" – 7:13
3. "Two Down" (John Etheridge, John Marshall) – 2:27
4. "The Spraunce" (Peter Lemer, Steve Cook) – 6:27
5. "Song of Aeolus" – 3:41
6. "Sideburn" (John Marshall) – 7:44
7. "The Tale of Taliesin" – 8:08
8. "Organic Matter (Steve Cook) / One Over the Eight" (Alan Wakeman, John Etheridge, John Marshall, Karl Jenkins, Roy Babbington) – 5:55
9. "Soft Space, Part One" (edited version) – 4:15
10. "Soft Space, Part Two" (disco version) – 5:41

== Personnel ==
Soft Machine

- John Marshall – drums, percussion
- Karl Jenkins – piano, electric keyboards, synthesizer
- John Etheridge – acoustic and electric guitars
- Ric Sanders – violin (credited as Rick Sanders)
- Steve Cook – bass guitar

Additional personnel

- Mike Ratledge – electronic percussion programming on "Soft Space"
