= Burden of Proof (Soft Machine Legacy album) =

Studio album by Soft Machine Legacy
- Released: 13 January 2013 (Digital album) 18 March 2013 (CD)
- Recorded: August 2012
- Length: 55:08
- Label: Moonjune

Soft Machine Legacy chronology
Live Adventures (2010)	Burden of Proof (2013)

Soft Machine chronology
Land of Cockayne (1981)	Hidden Details (2018)

Professional ratings
Review scores
Source	Rating
AllMusic	3/5 stars
dprp.net	9/10 stars

Burden of Proof is the sixth album by the Canterbury associated band Soft Machine Legacy and their third studio album, released on CD in March 2013. This was the last album to use the "Legacy" suffix before it was dropped in 2015. Soft Machine returned with Hidden Details in 2018 featuring the same line-up that recorded this album.

== Track listing ==
1. "Burden of Proof" (5:51) (John Etheridge)
2. "Voyage Beyond Seven" (4:53) (Theo Travis)
3. "Kitto" (1:50) (John Etheridge)
4. "Pie Chart" (5:07) (John Etheridge)
5. "JSP" (1:03) (John Marshall)
6. "Kings and Queens" (6:46) (Hugh Hopper)
7. "Fallout" (6:59) (Theo Travis)
8. "Going Somewhere Canorous?" (1:13) (Roy Babbington, John Marshall)
9. "Black and Crimson" (5:05) (Theo Travis)
10. "The Brief" (2:27) (John Marshall, Theo Travis)
11. "Pump Room" (5:19) (John Etheridge)
12. "Green Cubes" (5:33) (Roy Babbington, John Etheridge, John Marshall, Theo Travis)
13. "They Landed on a Hill" (3:03) (John Etheridge, Theo Travis)

== Personnel ==
- Theo Travis – tenor sax, flute, Fender Rhodes electric piano
- John Etheridge – guitar
- Roy Babbington – bass guitar
- John Marshall – drums, percussion

=== Credits ===
- Recorded by Beppe Crovella, at Electromantic Synergy Studio, San Sabastiano da Po, Italy; August 2012.
- Mixed and mastered by Andrew Tulloch, at The Blue Room, London; December 2012 through January 2013.
- Produced by Soft Machine Legacy.
- Executive Producer: Leonardo Pavkovic.
