= Achirana =

Studio album by Vassilis Tsabropoulos / Arild Andersen / John Marshall
- Released: 2000
- Recorded: October 1999
- Genres: Avant-garde jazz, Chamber jazz
- Length: 69:39
- Labels: ECM; ECM 1728
- Producer: Manfred Eicher

Vassilis Tsabropoulos chronology
Mussorgsky: Pictures at an Exhibition (1997)	Achirana (2000)	Chopin: August Symphony (2001)

Achirana is an album by Greek pianist and composer Vassilis Tsabropoulos recorded in October 1999 and released on ECM the following year. The trio features rhythm section Arild Andersen and John Marshall.

== Reception ==
The AllMusic review by Thom Jurek awarded the album 4 stars stating "As Tsabropoulos' debut, this is without doubt an auspicious beginning."

Professional ratings
Review scores
Source	Rating
AllMusic	4/5 stars

== Track listing ==
All compositions by Vassilis Tsabropoulos except as indicated

1. "Achirana" (Arild Andersen, John Marshall, Vassilis Tsabropoulos) – 8:06
2. "Diamond Cut Diamond" (Andersen, Marshall, Tsabropoulos) – 7:25
3. "Valley" (Andersen, Tsabropoulos) – 5:42
4. "Mystic" – 7:21
5. "The Spell" – 10:40
6. "She's Gone" (Andersen) – 5:48
7. "Fable" – 8:22
8. "Song for Phyllis" – 7:52
9. "Monologue" – 8:23

== Personnel ==
- Vassilis Tsabropoulos – piano
- Arild Andersen – double bass
- John Marshall – drums
