= Geoff Eales =

Welsh jazz pianist

Geoff Eales (born 13 March 1951) is a Welsh jazz pianist, improviser and composer.

== Music education ==
Eales was born in Aberbargoed, Wales. When he was eight years old, he learned 12-bar blues from his father, a pianist in a local dance band. In school he studied classical piano and French Horn, becoming a member of the Glamorgan Youth Orchestra and the National Youth Orchestra of Wales. He attended Cardiff University, receiving bachelor's, masters, and doctoral degrees. In 1980 he was awarded a Ph.D. for his large scale orchestral work "An American Symphony" and a setting of Dylan Thomas' poem "In the Beginning" for tenor, French horn, and piano.

His thesis was entitled "Structure in the Symphonic Works of Aaron Copland".

== Career ==
After leaving school, Eales played piano on a Greek cruise ship and traveled around the world. For a few months he lived in New Orleans where he worked with Major Holley, Jimmy McPartland, Buddy Tate, and Earl Warren. He moved to London in 1977 and became a member of the Joe Loss band, then spent four years as pianist for the BBC Big Band.

Eales has worked with Sir Andrew Lloyd Webber, Andy Williams, Dame Shirley Bassey, Jose Carreras, Kiri Te Kanawa, Jerry Goldsmith, Henry Mancini, Elmer Bernstein, Bob Farnon, Billy May, Adelaide Hall, Michael Ball and many others and has played on film soundtracks, records, TV shows and jingles.

He released his debut album, Mountains of Fire in 1999.

== Discography ==
Year recorded	Title	Label	Personnel/Notes
1999	Mountains of Fire	Black Box	Trio with Roy Babbington (bass), Mark Fletcher (drums); Quartet with Nigel Hitchcock (saxophone), Laurence Cottle (bass guitar), Ian Thomas (drums)
2001	Red Letter Days	Black Box	Quartet, with Jim Mullen (guitar), Roy Babbington (bass), Mark Fletcher (drums)
2002	Facing the Muse	Mainstem	Trio with Roy Babbington (bass), Mark Fletcher (drums)
2004	Synergy	Basho	Solo Piano
2006	The Homecoming	33 Jazz	Trio with Roy Babbington (bass), Mark Fletcher (drums)
2007	Jazz Piano Legends	Jaz2	Trio with Roy Babbington (bass), Mark Fletcher (drums)
2007	Epicentre	33 Jazz	Solo piano
2009	Master of the Game	Edition	Trio with Chris Laurence (bass), Martin France (percussion)
2011	Shifting Sands	33 Jazz	Isorhythm with Christian Garrick (violin), Ben Waghorn (saxes, bass clarinet), Carl Orr (guitar), Fred T Baker (bass guitar), Asaf Sirkis (drums)
2013	The Dancing Flute	Nimbus Alliance	Duo with Andy Findon (flutes, piccolo)
2013	Free Flow	33Xtreme	Trio with Ben Waghorn (saxes, bass clarinet), Ashley John Long (bass)
2014	Invocation	Nimbus Alliance	Solo Piano
2016	Transience	Fuzzy Moon	Quintet with Brigitte Beraha (voice), Noel Langley (trumpet, flugel), Chris Laurence (bass), Martin France (drums)
2021	Memoir	33Xtreme	Solo Piano with guest appearances from Andy Findon (flute), Ray Roughler Jones (poetry reading)
2022	Love Sacred and Profane	33 Jazz	Ensemble with Brigitte Beraha, Brenda Ford, Jacqui Hicks, Jenny Howe (vocals), Matt Ridley (bass), Sophie Alloway (drums), Mark Lockheart (soprano sax), Ben Waghorn (alto sax, soprano sax, bass clarinet), Jason Yarde (alto sax), Andy Findon (flute, ethnic flute, penny whistle), Carl Orr (guitar), Shirley Smart (cello)
