= John Etheridge =

English guitarist, composer and bandleader (born 1948)

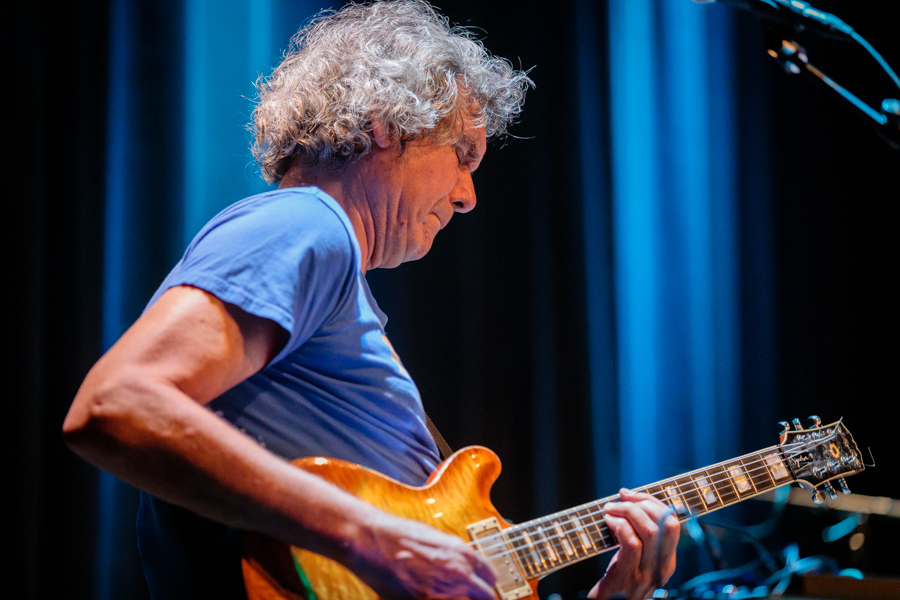
- Etheridge on stage in 2018

Background information
- Born: John Michael Glyn Etheridge; 12 January 1948 (age 78); Lambeth, England
- Genres: Jazz rock, rock, world
- Occupation: Musician
- Instrument: Guitar
- Years active: 1966–present
- Website: www.johnetheridge.com

John Michael Glyn Etheridge (born 12 January 1948) is an English guitarist, composer, bandleader and educator known for his eclecticism and broad range of associations in jazz, classical, and contemporary music. He is best known for his work with Soft Machine from 1975 to 1978, 1984 and 2004 to present. He is the longest serving member in the history of the group surpassing founding member Mike Ratledge.

== Biography ==
=== Early life ===
Etheridge began playing at the age of 13, his early influences being Hank Marvin of The Shadows and Django Reinhardt. Although his father was a jazz pianist, he was primarily self-taught. In the mid-1960s, he formed his first notable band, Rush Release, with Robert Lipson (the future drummer of Gracious!). The band was formed at the height of the British "blues boom", with the emergence of guitarists such as Peter Green, Jeff Beck and, later, Jimi Hendrix. Etheridge played with Rush Release at London's Speakeasy Club in 1966, and on occasion would jam with other guitarists on the scene such as Eric Clapton.

In 1967, Etheridge left London to study History of Art at Essex University. While he continued to play during this period, he did not take up guitar professionally again until 1970. It was during this period that Etheridge further developed his interest in jazz and fusion, an important influence at this time being John McLaughlin's 1969 debut album, Extrapolation.

=== 1970s ===
Upon returning to the London scene in the early 1970s, Etheridge briefly worked with the Deep Purple offshoot Warhorse, followed by a stint with Icarus during the final stages of recording their album The Marvel World of Icarus. He recalled: "I'd been on the fringes of the London rock scene for a couple of years, and one of the musicians I came across was [Icarus woodwinds player] Norrie Devine. I desperately needed somewhere to live, and he put me in touch with Peter Curtain." Curtain, the drummer for Icarus, set Etheridge up with a flat and offered him a spot in the band after their guitarist left. Though the album sleeve credited Etheridge for all the guitar parts, only one track featured him as the sole guitarist (though he did overdubs on several other tracks). He stayed with Icarus for their subsequent tour of Romania, which ended abruptly when President Nicolae Ceaușescu ordered the band to be deported. The Romanian tour marked their final public appearance.

In late 1972, Etheridge joined Curved Air violinist Darryl Way's band Wolf, which went on to record three albums in the progressive rock canon for the Deram label: Canis Lupus (1973), Saturation Point (1973), and Night Music (1974). It also provided an outlet for his first compositions, at a rate of one or two tracks per album.

Following Wolf's break-up, Etheridge briefly played in the Global Village Trucking Company for a UK tour supporting Gong in early 1975, before a recommendation from fellow guitarist Allan Holdsworth led to him joining Soft Machine, now in full fusion mode having just released Bundles. Etheridge went on to record two albums with the band, Softs (1976) and Alive & Well: Recorded in Paris (1978). He also played on the more recent release, British Tour '75 (2005).

With Soft Machine's activities slowing down in the late 1970s, Etheridge began to develop parallel ventures. It was at this time that he began what would become a long-term collaboration with French violinist Stéphane Grappelli, with whom he performed on numerous world tours between 1976 and 1981. The late 1970s also saw Etheridge form the band 2nd Vision, with fellow Soft Machine member, violinist Ric Sanders. Though the band released an album in 1980, they struggled to achieve broader recognition in the hostile post-punk environment and broke up in 1981.

=== 1980–present ===
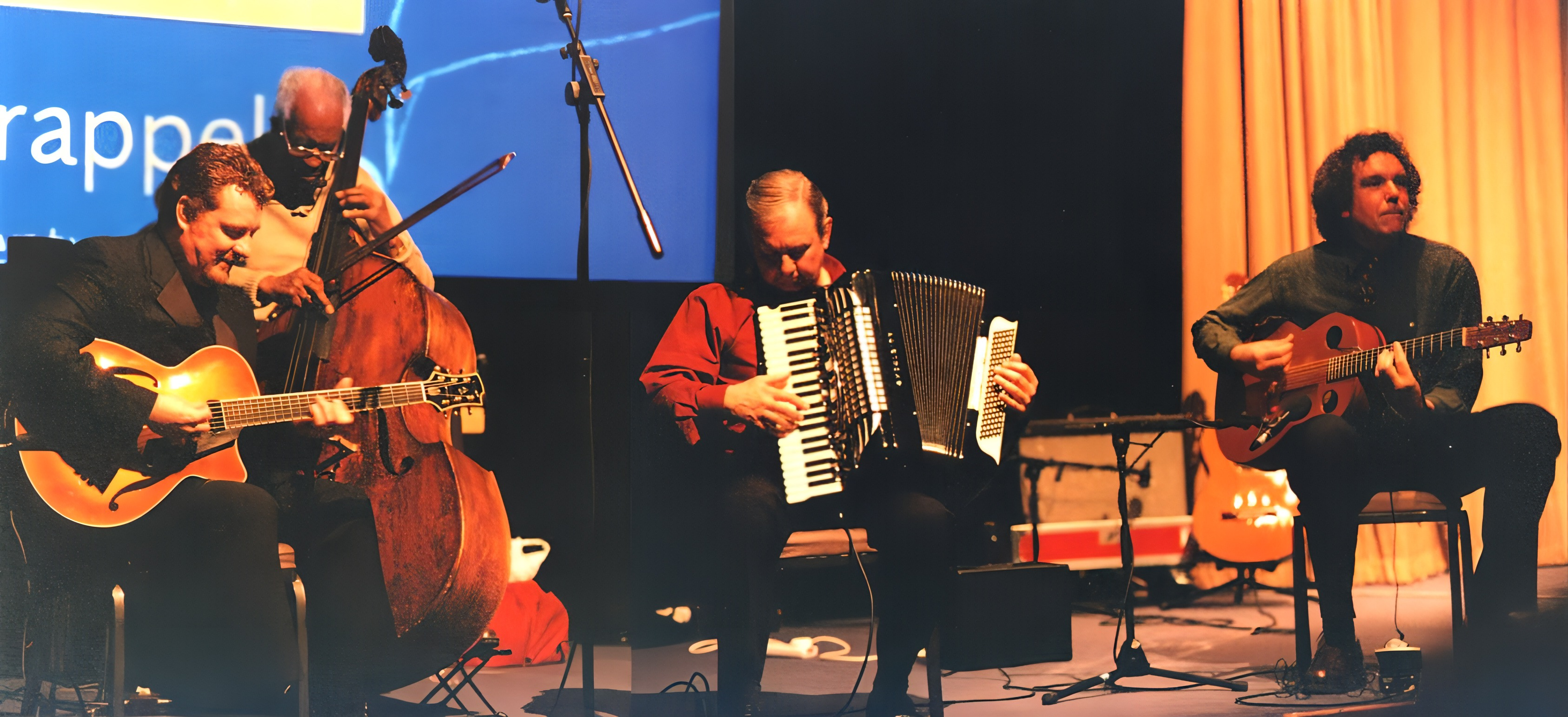
Etheridge (right) at the launch of the Stéphane Grappelli DVD A Life in the Jazz Century, London, 2002, with Martin Taylor (left), Coleridge Goode (bass) and Jack Emblow (accordion)

The 1980s saw Etheridge remain very active on the live front – including a reunion with Soft Machine for the band's final series of concerts at Ronnie Scott's Jazz Club in 1984 – but much less productive in the studio. "1981 was a sort of watershed year for me... there's sort of before and after 1981. Since then I've mostly played on my own or led bands, playing alongside other people but not in settled formations. That was partly because I liked to do that, and partly because, frankly, I didn't really know what to do with myself at that point. I'd always enjoyed playing sort of jazz-type gigs, so I started doing it..."

In 1982, Etheridge played solo concerts in Australia and duo dates with bassist Brian Torff in the US. In 1983, he toured England with his own trio, and the following year joined forces with ex-Isotope guitarist Gary Boyle. Between 1989 and 1993, he was a member of Danny Thompson's group Whatever, playing on the album Elemental (1990). Between 1988 and 1994, he did a lot of touring in Germany with Dick Heckstall-Smith, recording two albums as the Dick Heckstall-Smith / John Etheridge Band, Live in Erlangen and Obsession Fees. Also in 1988, Etheridge made a duo record with New York guitarist Vic Juris, Bohemia, toured with Biréli Lagrène, and played in the Elton Dean/John Etheridge Quartet with Fred Baker (bass) and Mark Fletcher (drums).

In 1992, he joined violinist Nigel Kennedy's live band, playing on his albums Kafka (1996) and The Kennedy Experience – The Music of Jimi Hendrix (1998).

In 1994, he released a duo album, Invisible Threads, with longtime friend Andy Summers (a former Soft Machine guitarist, albeit in a much earlier incarnation of the group), and did a world tour with him. The duo recorded the album using only acoustic guitars and acoustic bass. The same year, Etheridge released his first solo album, Ash, mostly featuring his regular band at the time – Steve Franklin on keyboards, Henry Thomas on bass and Mark Fletcher on drums – as well as duets with bassist Dudley Phillips. Subsequent solo albums included Chasing Shadows (2001), I Didn't Know (2004), Stitched Up (2006, with his Trio North), In House – Live In London (2007, with Arild Andersen and John Marshall), Alone – Live ! (2008) and Break Even (2008, with Liane Carroll).

Etheridge has been nominated for 'Musician of the Year' at the Parliamentary Jazz Awards three times (in 2005, 2006, and 2011).

== Collaborations ==
In addition to countless one-off line-ups assembled for jazz gigs, Etheridge is involved in several long-term projects, including: a guitar duo with John Williams, which released Places Between – Live in Dublin; the Grappelli tribute Sweet Chorus, which released Sweet Chorus – Tribute to Grappelli in 1998; the Frank Zappa tribute band, Zappatistas, (formed 1999), who released a live CD, The Music of Frank Zappa – Absolutely Live (2001) and have since toured widely, appearing at the German progressive rock/jazz festival Zappanale in 2006; and Soft Machine Legacy, alongside fellow ex-Soft Machine members Hugh Hopper, John Marshall and Elton Dean (the latter replaced by Theo Travis after Dean died in early 2006). They have released three studio albums, all of which include Etheridge compositions: Soft Machine Legacy (2005), Steam (2007), and Burden of Proof (2013). The band have also produced a number of live releases, including Live in Zaandam (2005) and Live At The New Morning (2006), which includes a DVD filmed just a few weeks prior to Dean's passing. Etheridge toured and recorded with the band Hawkwind in 2014. In 2016, Etheridge and jazz singer Vimala Rowe release the collaborative album Out of the Sky, which explores a range of jazz, flamenco, Indian classical, traditional African, and blues influences.

== Discography ==
=== As leader ===
- 1994: Ash
- 2003: Chasing Shadows (Dyad)
- 2006: Places in Between with John Williams (Sony Classical)

=== As member ===
With Icarus

- 1972: Marvel World of Icarus

With Darryl Way's Wolf

- 1973: Canis Lupus
- 1973: Saturation Point
- 1974: Night Music

With Soft Machine

- 1976: Softs
- 1977: Triple Echo
- 1978: Alive & Well: Recorded in Paris
- 1994: Rubber Riff
- 2005: British Tour '75
- 2018: Hidden Details
- 2023: Other Doors
- 2026: Thirteen

With Soft Machine Legacy

- 2005: Live in Zaandam
- 2006: Soft Machine Legacy
- 2006: New Morning: The Paris Concert
- 2007: Steam
- 2010: Live Adventures
- 2013: Burden of Proof

With Second Vision

- 1980: First Steps

=== Collaborations ===
With Stéphane Grappelli

- 1978: Tea for Two with Yehudi Menuhin
- 1980: Strictly for the Birds with Yehudi Menuhin
- 1981: At the Winery
- 1983: Live at Carnegie Hall
- 1988: Menuhin & Grappelli Play "Jealousy" and Other Great Standards with Yehudi Menuhin

With Nigel Kennedy

- 1996: Kafka
- 1999: The Kennedy Experience

With others

- 1992: Obsession Fees, Dick Heckstall-Smith
- 1992: Hear My Song, John Altman
- 1993: Invisible Threads, Andy Summers
- 1995: Two's & Three's, Elton Dean
- 1996: Secret Island, Theo Travis
- 1998: Whatever's Best, Danny Thompson
- 2001: The Music of Frank Zappa - Absolutely Live, Zappatistas
- 2002: Fairport Unconventional, Fairport Convention
- 2002: Unhinged Take No. 2, Mark Latimer
- 2006: Bohemia, Vic Juris
- 2008: Still Waters, Ric Sanders
- 2009: The Ridge, Chris Jagger
- 2015: Space Fusion Odyssey, Nik Turner
- 2015: Space Ritual Live 2014, Hawkwind
- 2017: From the Half House, Pye Hastings

== Filmography ==
- 2014: Jake Thackray and Songs (DVD)
- 2015: Romantic Warriors III: Canterbury Tales (DVD)
