= John Marshall (musician) =

American drummer

John Marshall (born May 2, 1954) is an American percussionist. He has worked with many musicians including David Darling, George Benson, Benjamin Verdery, and the Paul Winter Consort.

== Professional career ==
Marshall includes the drumming traditions of the Middle East, North and South India, Egypt, West Africa, the Caribbean, and Central Asia in his repertoire. Performing on frame drums, tabla, doumbek, djembe, congas, riq, pandeiro, conventional Western percussion, and all manner of hand-held percussion, John Marshall's music has been featured on National Public Radio's All Things Considered, Echoes, Hearts of Space and the BBC. He has performed and recorded with such artists as the Paul Winter Consort, Michael Brecker, Glen Velez, Rhonda Larson, Danny Gottlieb, Harvie S, Robert Gass, Steve Gorn, Omar Faruk Tekbilek, Paco Peña, David Darling, Eugene Friesen, Benjamin Verdery, Yevgeny Yevtushenko, George Benson and Marc Anthony.

With numerous CD credits to his name, Marshall is recorded on DMP, Ellipsis Arts, Sony, Jazzheads, Spring Hill, Windham Hill and Virgin Records labels. The recipient of several awards, he has been recognized for excellence in percussion music education by the Pro-Mark Drum Corporation. In 2004 he was commissioned to compose original music for the ASAP Community dance project in collaboration with Pilobolus Dance Theatre.

He performs with the classical/jazz/world ensemble Ufonia. He composes for and performs with numerous percussion groups, including Framework, and WoMaDe. He has released his own CDs featuring his original compositions, and has created online hand percussion instruction for Warner Brothers/Alfred. Currently Marshall performs with the experimental improvisational trio, Bridges and Poems, and is studying North Indian tabla with Subhankar Banerjee.

In 2009, he received a national fellowship award from the Jubilation Foundation.

== Publications ==
- Hand Drums for Beginners
- World Beat Encyclopedia (with Mark Miller)
- Drum Atlas: Africa
- Drum Atlas: Volume 1
