= 2nd Vision =

- Genres: Jazz-Rock
- Labels: Blueprint Records

2nd Vision was a British jazz-rock band notable for including guitarist John Etheridge and violinist Ric Sanders, both former members of Soft Machine. It released the album First Steps, which has been re-released on Blueprint Records (Voiceprint Group) in 2006.

The roots of 2nd Vision were sown in 1977 when Sanders invited keyboard player Dave Bristow and drummer Mickey Barker, both of whom he had already played with in his Birmingham days, to form an improvising unit named Surrounding Silence, which debuted at the Riverside Jazz Festival in August 1977.

After Etheridge and ex-Gryphon bassist Jonathan Davie joined them, the band, renamed 20/20 Vision, played a well-received gig at the Alexandra Palace in May 1979. The band were offered a management deal by Jo Lustig, who had already represented the likes of Richard Thompson, Pentangle and the Chieftains, and signed with Chrysalis, recording their debut LP in the autumn of 1979, with John Cameron producing. The material was composed by either Sanders or Bristow, with Etheridge contributing one piece, a new version of his Soft Machine solo acoustic guitar piece "Etika".

"It was a jazz-rock group, in the mould of Weather Report, Mahavishnu, that kind of things", Etheridge remembered. "The one album we made was a very good record. It sounds dated now of course, because it was done using the Yamaha CS-80... But of all the records that I've made, it's the one that the most trouble was taken over making. I was very pleased with the guitar on it, we took a lot of time to do it. I was quite happy with that... But this was in the late 70's, so it was all punk and new-wave...".

The album was launched with a four-night residency at London's Riverside Studios in Hammersmith on 7–10 May 1980, with a different guest (Richard Thompson, Gordon Giltrap, Jethro Tull's David Palmer, June Tabor) joining the band each night. Unfortunately, all the British music papers went on strike for several weeks, so there was almost no coverage of the event, and the album failed to sell.

There was an attempt to continue the band with a revised line-up, including bassist Fred Thelonious Baker and drummer Nick Twyman (his predecessor Barker would go on to join heavy-metal band Magnum in 1985), which toured the UK extensively as the John Etheridge/Ric Sanders Group in May 1981, but this was to be its swansong.
