= Vassilis Tsabropoulos =

Greek pianist, conductor, and composer

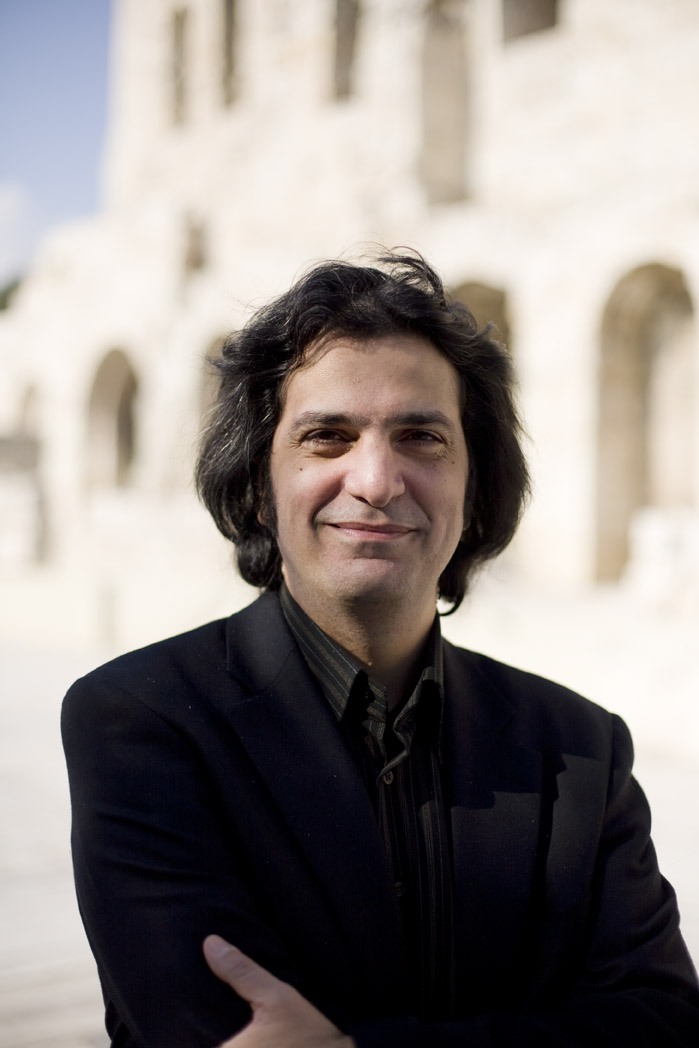

Background information
- Born: 7 February 1966 (age 60); Athens, Greece
- Genres: Classic, Jazz
- Occupations: pianist, composer, conductor
- Instrument: piano
- Years active: 1978–present
- Label: ECM

Vassilis Tsabropoulos (in Greek: Βασίλης Τσαμπρόπουλος) is a Greek pianist, conductor, and composer.

== Career ==
Tsabropoulos's initial training was in classical piano. As a child prodigy, he won the UNISEF Competition. He studied at National Conservatory of Athens, from which he graduated with honours at the age of fifteen, having received a scholarship from Alexandro's Onassis Foundation. He continued to study at the Paris Conservatory, the International Music Academy of Salzburg and the Juilliard School. He was a student of Rudolf Serkin and Tatiana Nikolayeva.

As a concert pianist, he has taken the stage with many orchestras including the Philharmonia Orchestra, the Stockholm Philharmonic, the Baltimore Symphony Orchestra, the Czech Philharmonic, the Royal Concert Philharmonic Orchestra, Budapest Chamber Orchestrate, Sofia Philharmonic, and the Italy Radio Orchestra. He has performed with the London Philharmonia and Czech Philharmonic Orchestra under the baton of Vladimir Ashkenazy in piano concertos of Beethoven and Rachmaninoff. In October 2019, he performed Beethoven's Emperor piano concerto and Mozart's concerto No. 20, appearing both as a soloist and as conductor of the Royal Philharmonic Orchestra of London.

Tsabropoulos has collaborated with the German cellist Anja Lechner, performing classic repertoire and his compositions. Tsabropoulos and Lechner achieved significant recognition for their two albums, Chants Hymns and Dances (2004) and Melos (2008). He has formed a piano duet with Vovka Ashkenazy, playing concerts in France, Iceland and Greece.

Since 2013, he has performed with Byzantine sacred music artist Nektaria Karantzi, in an artistic collaboration inspired by Byzantine hymns and traditional Greek music.

Tsabropoulos is honorary president of the Sergei Rachmaninov Greek Society and the music director and principal conductor of the Metropolitan Symphony Orchestra of Athens.

== Critical reception ==
Vladimir Ashkenazy wrote of him, "Vassilis Tsabropoulos possesses rare talent".

His first piano solo ECM album, Akroasis, attracted the praise of The Independent writer Andrew Clarke, who wrote, "The effects are hypnotic and mysterious, shimmering like ancient mosaic". A reviewer of his album Melos commented that "Tsabropoulos' compositions have a static beauty and drama [... that draw] their inspiration from Greek folk music and Byzantine hymns". JazzTimes magazine called the album The Triangle a combination of jazz, tango, and classical music. Norwegian bassist and leader on The Triangle Arild Adersen also commented: "What struck me straight away was the fact that his exceptional classical technique never got in the way of his jazz feeling".

The Times reviewer Mike Bradley, commented that: "Athenian pianist Vassilis Tsabropoulos is one of those rare musicians who is equally at home in both the classical and jazz worlds. His album Achirana demonstrates that, while noted principally for his prowess as a classical pianist, conductor and composer, he also has much to say in a jazz idiom. Accompanied by Norwegian bassist Arild Andersen and British veteran drummer John Marshall, he has assembled an exquisite record filled with fluid, fluent improvisations, which transport and delight. Sample the fearlessly slow gems 'Diamond Cut Diamond' and 'Valley' and be amazed".

== Discography ==
- Skyscape (1990)
- Images (1992)
- Mussorgsky: Pictures at an Exhibition (1997)
- Achirana, with Arild Andersen and John Marshall (ECM, 2000)
- Live in Cremona (2002)
- Akroasis (ECM, 2003)
- The Triangle, with Arild Andersen and John Marshall (ECM, 2004)
- Chants, Hymns and Dances, with Anja Lechner (ECM, 2004)
- Melos, with Anja Lechner and U.T. Gandhi (ECM, 2008)
- The Promise (ECM, 2009)
- Eleison, with Nektaria Karantzi (MSO, 2016)
- Tsabropoulos in concert (MSO 2017 - piano works of Beethoven and Schumann)
