= Solid Gold Cadillac =

Solid Gold Cadillac was a British jazz-rock group set up in the early 1970s. The band featured, variously, Roy Babbington (bass), Mike Westbrook (electric piano), Fi Trench (piano, organ), Chris Spedding (guitar), Brian Godding (guitar), Rick Morcombe (guitars), Malcolm Griffiths (trombone), Phil Minton (lead vocals, trumpet), George Khan (sax, flute), Butch Potter (bass) and Alan Jackson (drums).

The band released two albums on RCA Records: Solid Gold Cadillac (1972) and Brain Damage (1973), re-released together on CD in 1999.
