= The Promise (Vassilis Tsabropoulos album) =

Studio album by Vassilis Tsabropoulos
- Released: 2009
- Recorded: January 2008
- Studio: Dimitris Mitropoulos Hall; Megaron, Athens
- Genre: Jazz
- Length: 54:58
- Label: ECM; ECM 2080
- Producer: Manfred Eicher

Vassilis Tsabropoulos chronology
Melos (2007)	The Promise (2009)

The Promise is a solo album by Greek composer and pianist Vassilis Tsabropoulos recorded in January 2008 and released on ECM the following year.

== Reception ==
The AllMusic review by Michael G. Nastos awarded the album 3½ stars stating "This album lives up to its under-the-surface, ruminative nature, but should be slotted in for the appropriate mood or time of evening, when lights are either very low, or turned off."

Professional ratings
Review scores
Source	Rating
Allmusic	3.5/5 stars

== Track listing ==
All compositions by Vassilis Tsabropoulos

1. "The Other" - 5:07
2. "Tale of a Man" - 6:00
3. "Smoke and Mirrors" - 6:59
4. "Pearl" - 3:10
5. "The Promise" - 5:14
6. "The Other, var. I" 3:50
7. "Djivaeri" - 4:43
8. "The Insider" - 7:01
9. "Confession" - 3:56
10. "Promenade" - 4:57
11. "The Other, var. II" - 4:01

== Personnel ==
- Vassilis Tsabropoulos – piano
