= Hidden Details =

Studio album by Soft Machine
- Released: 7 September 2018
- Recorded: 20–22 December 2017
- Studios: Temple Music Studio, Surrey, South East England
- Genre: Jazz fusion
- Length: 60:25
- Label: MoonJune Records
- Producers: Theo Travis, John Etheridge

Soft Machine chronology
Land of Cockayne (1981)	Hidden Details (2018)	Live at the Baked Potato (2020)

Soft Machine Legacy chronology
Burden of Proof (2013)

Professional ratings
Review scores
Source	Rating
All About Jazz	4/5 stars

Hidden Details is the eleventh studio album by the jazz rock band Soft Machine, released in September 2018.

== Overview ==
Hidden Details is the first album released under the Soft Machine moniker since Land of Cockayne in 1981, with a six-night residency at Ronnie Scott's club in 1984 being the last time Soft Machine were active until 2015. Several members from Soft Machine's history operated under the name "Soft Machine Legacy" from 2004 until dropping the "Legacy" from their name in 2015, thus re-activating Soft Machine after 31 years. This album was recorded by the same line-up that released the Soft Machine Legacy album Burden of Proof in 2013. From the 1984 line-up were drummer John Marshall, who joined Soft Machine in 1972, and guitarist John Etheridge, who joined in 1975 and left in 1978 before re-joining for the 1984 shows. Bassist Roy Babbington, who was with Soft Machine during 1973 to 1976, was also included, while Theo Travis completed the line-up on keyboards and saxophone. "The Man Who Waved at Trains" is a rerecording of a track written by original member Ratledge from their 8th album Bundles. "Out Bloody Rageous" is a rerecording of a track from their album Third.

== Track listing ==
No.	Title	Writer(s)	Length
1.	"Hidden Details"	Theo Travis	7:36
2.	"The Man Who Waved at Trains"	Mike Ratledge	5:00
3.	"Ground Lift"	Travis, Roy Babbington	5:21
4.	"Heart Off Guard"	John Etheridge	2:29
5.	"Broken Hill"	Etheridge	3:49
6.	"Flight of the Jett"	Etheridge, Travis, John Marshall, Babbington	2:12
7.	"One Glove"	Etheridge	4:30
8.	"Out Bloody Intro"	Travis, Ratledge	2:41
9.	"Out Bloody Rageous (Part 1)"	Ratledge	4:56
10.	"Drifting White"	Etheridge	1:47
11.	"Life on Bridges"	Travis	8:05
12.	"Fourteen Hour Dream"	Travis	6:24
13.	"Breathe"	Travis, Marshall	5:12
Total length:			60:25

=== 2018 Vinyl version (Tonefloat TF185) ===
Side A

No.	Title	Writer(s)	Length
1.	"Hidden Details"	Theo Travis	7:36
2.	"The Man Who Waved at Trains"	Mike Ratledge	5:00
3.	"Ground Lift"	Travis, Roy Babbington	5:21
4.	"Night Sky"	John Etheridge, Travis, Babbington	3:19

Side B

No.	Title	Writer(s)	Length
5.	"Heart Off Guard"	Etheridge	2:29
6.	"Broken Hill"	Etheridge	3:49
7.	"Flight of the Jett"	Etheridge, Travis, John Marshall, Babbington	2:12
8.	"One Glove"	Etheridge	4:30
9.	"Out Bloody Intro"	Travis, Ratledge	2:41
10.	"Out Bloody Rageous (Part 1)"	Ratledge	4:56

Side C

No.	Title	Writer(s)	Length
11.	"Drifting White"	Etheridge	1:47
12.	"Life on Bridges"	Travis	8:05
13.	"Fourteen Hour Dream"	Travis	6:24
14.	"Breathe"	Travis, Marshall	5:12

Side D (Bonus Tracks)

No.	Title	Writer(s)	Length
15.	"Only When"	Etheridge, Travis, Babbington	2:37
16.	"Green Collared Man"	Etheridge	3:14
17.	"Ground Lift (Alternative Take)"	Travis, Babbington	4:45
18.	"Just Add Hock"	Etheridge, Travis, Marshall, Babbington	3:35
19.	"SDS"	Marshall	2:20
20.	"Round the Corner"	Etheridge, Travis	3:06
Total length:			80:02

== Personnel ==
Soft Machine

- Theo Travis (joined ‘Soft Machine Legacy’ in 2006) – tenor and soprano saxophones, flutes, Fender Rhodes piano
- John Etheridge (joined in 1975) – electric and acoustic guitars
- Roy Babbington (joined in 1973) – bass
- John Marshall (joined in 1972) – drums, percussion

Guest musicians

- Nick Utteridge – chimes on "Breathe"
