= Wonderin' =

Studio album by Rollercoaster
- Released: 1980
- Recorded: 1979–1980
- Studios: Pye Studios, London
- Genre: Jazz-funk
- Labels: Ronnie Scott's Record Productions, Pye
- Producers: Karl Jenkins, Mike Ratledge

Wonderin' is a tribute album featuring jazz-funk cover versions of Stevie Wonder songs. It was recorded by the ad hoc band Rollercoaster made up of leading UK session and jazz musicians from British jazz-rock bands of the 1960s and 1970s such as Soft Machine, Blue Mink and Nucleus.

It was released on Ronnie Scott's record label. Many of the Rollercoaster musicians later recorded the Soft Machine album, Land of Cockayne, and made up Soft Machine's live line-up which played a six-night residency at Ronnie Scott's in 1984.

== Track listing ==
1. "I Wish"
2. "Boogie On Reggae Woman"
3. "Higher Ground"
4. "Superstition"
5. "Mr. W." (Karl Jenkins)
6. "Living for the City"

== Personnel ==
- Ron Mathewson – bass
- Barry Morgan – drums
- Alan Parker – guitar
- Karl Jenkins – keyboards
- Mike Ratledge – keyboards
- Mike Pyne – piano
- Dick Morrissey – saxophone
- Ray Warleigh – saxophone
- Chris Pyne – trombone
- Derek Watkins – trumpet
