= Hummingbird (Rick Wakeman and Dave Cousins album) =

Studio album by Rick Wakeman and Dave Cousins
- Released: 2002
- Recorded: 2002
- Genre: folk rock, progressive rock
- Length: 43:35
- Label: Witchwood Media

Rick Wakeman and Dave Cousins chronology
Hummingbird (2002)	Wakeman & Cousins Live (2004)

Professional ratings
Review scores
Source	Rating
Allmusic	3/5 stars

Hummingbird is a studio album by Rick Wakeman and Dave Cousins. The songs are a mixture of jointly-composed originals, reworkings of songs from Strawbs albums and Dave Cousins' solo album Two Weeks Last Summer, together with Wakeman instrumental compositions presented as codas to the Cousins songs.

The album cover is painted by Wakeman's girlfriend, Italian artist Alina Bencini.

== Track listing ==
1. "The Young Pretender" (Dave Cousins, Rick Wakeman) – 5:50
2. "Hummingbird" (Cousins, Wakeman) – 3:41
3. "So Shall Our Love Die" (Cousins) – 3:36
4. "Steppes" (Wakeman) – 1:23
5. "October to May" (Cousins) – 3:26
6. "Ice Maiden" (Wakeman) – 0:42
7. "Higher Germanie" (Traditional) – 4:35
8. "Stone Cold is the Woman's Heart" (Cousins) – 4:32
9. "Crie du Coeur" (Wakeman) – 1:26
10. "All in Vain" (Cousins, Wakeman) – 3:50
11. "Can You Believe" (Cousins, Craig Leon, Cassell Webb) – 4:44
12. "Via Bencini" (Wakeman) – 2:12
13. "Forever Ocean Blue" (Cousins) – 3:38

== Personnel ==
- Rick Wakeman – keyboards
- Dave Cousins – vocals, acoustic guitar, dulcimer, banjo
- Ric Sanders – violin
- Mac McGann – tipple
- Chas Cronk – bass guitar
- Tony Fernandez – drums

== Recording ==
Hummingbird was recorded at Music Fusion Studios, Wembley.

Stuart Sawney (Recording & Mixing) Erik Jordan (Mixing) Roger Wake (Mastering)

== Release history ==
Region	Date	Label	Format	Catalog
Worldwide	2002	Witchwood	CD	WMCD2007
