= Dancing Days (album) =

Studio album by Chris Leslie
- Released: 2004
- Length: 55:22
- Label: Talking Elephant
- Producer: Chris Leslie

Chris Leslie chronology
The Gift (1999)	Dancing Days (2004)

Dancing Days is an album by Chris Leslie, released in 2004.

Compared to Chris Leslie's earlier album The Flow, this is much more of a recognisable instrumental folk-rock effort. Occasionally Chris drifts off into a reverie that sounds like a monastery in Tibet, but this is less obvious than before. He gives a sprightly performance of many morris dance tunes, then adds the oriental effects as a variation at the end of some tracks, punctuated by finger cymbals.

== Track listing ==
1. "Flowers of Edinburgh/ Old Tom of Oxford" (Traditional)
2. "Laudnum Bunches (Headington)/ Orange In Bloom (Sherbourne)/ Banks of the Dee (Longborough)" (Traditional / Traditional/ Traditional)
3. "Bower Processional (Lichfield)" (Traditional)
4. "Princess Royal (Adderbury)/ Speed The Plough (Bampton)" (Traditional)
5. "Old Marlborough (Fieldtown)" (Traditional)
6. "The Dancer (song)" (Chris Leslie)
7. "Jockey to the Fair (Adderbury)/ Double Jig (Bampton)" (Traditional/ Traditional)
8. "Lumps of Plum Pudding (Bledington)/ Bean Setting (Headington)/ Bobbing a Joe (Wheatley)" (Traditional/ Traditional/ Traditional)
9. "Sweet Jenny Jones (Adderbury) / Brighton Camp (Adderbury)/ Beaux of London City (Adderbury/ Badby)" (Traditional)
10. "Stourton Wake and Jig (Adderbury)" (Traditional)
11. "Haste to the Wedding (Adderbury) / Bluebells of Scotland (Adderbury) / Shepherd's Away (Adderbury)" (Traditional/ Traditional/ Traditional)
12. "Bumpus O' Stretton (Ilmington)" (Traditional)
13. "Janet Blunt Poem" (song) (words: Janet Blunt; tune: "Jamaica")
14. "Morning Star (Bledington)/ Getting Upstairs (Headington)/ Wheatley Processional (Wheatley)" (Traditional/ Traditional/ Traditional)
15. "A Secret" (medley *) (Traditional)

(* uncredited medley: Shepherd's Hey/ Bluebells of Scotland/ Brighton Camp/ sound of church bells/ Happy the Man (song))

== Personnel ==
- Chris Leslie - violins, percussion, bouzouki, mandolin, native American flute, kalimba, tingshaws, Tibetan singing bowls
- Simon Nicol - acoustic guitar
- Dave Pegg - bass
- Gerry Conway - percussion, congas
- Mat Green - violin
- Ric Sanders - violin
- Mikey Radford - dance
- Ashley Hutchings - bass
