= Land of Cockayne (album) =

Studio album by Soft Machine
- Released: March 1981
- Recorded: June–July 1980
- Studios: Pye Studios and Riverside Studios in London
- Length: 43:51
- Label: EMI (EMC 3348)
- Producer: Mike Thorne

Soft Machine chronology
| Alive & Well: Recorded in Paris (1978) | Land of Cockayne (1981) | Hidden Details (2018) |

Professional ratings
Review scores
| Source | Rating |
|---|---|
| AllMusic | 1.5/5 stars |

Land of Cockayne is the tenth album by the jazz rock band Soft Machine, released in 1981. The title refers to Cockaigne, the medieval land of plenty. It would be the last album released under the Soft Machine moniker until Hidden Details in 2018.

== Overview ==
In 1979, Karl Jenkins, who had been a member of Soft Machine from May 1972 to the band's split in December 1978, was among a number of top UK session and jazz musicians put together as an ad hoc band called Rollercoaster to record a tribute album called Wonderin' (1980) featuring jazz-funk cover versions of Stevie Wonder songs. After the completion of that album, a number of the Rollercoaster musicians decided to record another album together, this time under the Soft Machine name. Some of the musicians involved in the project would later be part of Soft Machine's next live line-up which played a six-night residency at Ronnie Scott's in 1984.

== Track listing ==
All compositions by Karl Jenkins.

=== Side one ===
| No. | Title | Length |
|---|---|---|
| 1. | "Over 'n' Above" | 7:24 |
| 2. | "Lotus Groves" | 4:57 |
| 3. | "Isle of the Blessed" | 1:56 |
| 4. | "Panoramania" | 7:07 |
| 5. | "Behind the Crystal Curtain" | 0:53 |

=== Side two ===
| No. | Title | Length |
|---|---|---|
| 1. | "Palace of Glass" | 3:22 |
| 2. | "Hot-Biscuit Slim" | 7:27 |
| 3. | "(Black) Velvet Mountain" | 5:10 |
| 4. | "Sly Monkey" | 5:00 |
| 5. | "A Lot of What You Fancy..." | 0:35 |

== Personnel ==
Soft Machine

- Karl Jenkins – piano, Minimoog, Yamaha CS-80, Synclavier, arranger, conductor
- John Marshall – drums, percussion
- Allan Holdsworth – lead guitar
- Ray Warleigh – alto saxophone, bass flute
- Dick Morrissey – tenor saxophone
- Alan Parker – rhythm guitar
- John Taylor – electric piano
- Jack Bruce – bass
- Stu Calver – vocals, backing vocals
- John Perry – vocals, backing vocals
- Tony Rivers – vocals, backing vocals

Additional personnel

- Mike Thorne – production
- Bill Harman – orchestra leader
- Roy Ellsworth – artwork
