= Ray Warleigh =

Australian jazz saxophonist (1938–2015)

- Born: Raymond Kenneth Warleigh; 28 September, 1938; Sydney, Australia
- Died: September 21, 2015 (aged 76)
- Genres: Jazz, blues
- Occupation: Musician
- Instruments: Alto saxophone, flute
- Years active: 1960s – 2000s
- Labels: Philips, Vinyl Records, Music House, psi, Rare Music, Acrobat, Jazz In Britain

Raymond Kenneth Warleigh (28 September 1938 – 21 September 2015) was an Australian alto saxophonist and flautist.

== Background ==
Ray Warleigh was born in Sydney, Australia, and migrated to England in 1960, where he quickly established himself as an in-demand session musician.

He played and recorded with major figures and bands of the UK jazz and blues scene, including Alexis Korner, Tubby Hayes, Humphrey Lyttelton, Terry Smith, Ronnie Scott, Long John Baldry, John Mayall, Keef Hartley, Allan Holdsworth, Soft Machine, Georgie Fame, Mike Westbrook, Dick Morrissey and Kenny Wheeler, as well as Mike Oldfield, Nick Drake, and Charlie Watts. He accompanied visiting artists such as Champion Jack Dupree. According to John Fordham in The Guardian wrote: "Ray Warleigh brought a unique touch to every venture he played on from the 60s on, and had a successful 30-year career that partnered him with Dusty Springfield, Marianne Faithfull, Scott Walker and Stevie Wonder, among others."

== Career ==
Warleigh's first album, in 1968, was produced by Scott Walker. During this same period a few years later, in 1971 he appeared on Nick Drake's second album, Bryter Layter, playing a beautifully memorable flute part on the final track "Sunday". His evocative performance, displaying both classical and jazz sensibilities, was in stark contrast to the percussive, unorthodox flute heard on contemporary albums such as Aqualung from the likes of Jethro Tull. His memory of the reclusive Nick Drake, reported in Warleigh's own obituary, was touchingly prosaic: “People often ask me about him. We went across the road to the pub for a beer. He was just like any ordinary music-loving person.” Warleigh's last album, Rue Victor Massé (2009), an improvisation with free-jazz drummer Tony Marsh, has received critical acclaim. According to Jazz Review: "The duo’s synergy and common goals resound mightily here. Featuring Warleigh’s lyrically resplendent sax and flute lines, in concert with a crystalline audio sound, the musicians flex some muscle amid buoyant underpinnings."

In 1973, he joined Latin fusion band Paz, led by vibist and composer Dick Crouch. He featured with the band for 8 years playing a weekly Sunday residency at the Kensington pub in Holland Park, recording albums including Kandeen Love Song, Paz Are Back (Spotlite Records), Paz Live at Chichester Festival (Magnus Records) and Look Inside (Paladin Records). Other members of the band were Dick Crouch leader and vibes, Ed Speight on guitar, Geoff Castle on keyboards, Ron Mathewson on bass guitar, Dave Sheen on drums and Chris Fletcher on percussion. In his leisure time Warleigh was an accomplished yachtsman, completing many voyages with his long-standing friend, Dr. Gillian Ross, with whom he co-owned several boats, before serious illness struck in 2011. He died of cancer on 21 September 2015.

== Discography ==
- 1968: Ray Warleigh’s First Album (Phillips)
- 1968: Fall Out – Terry Smith
- 1970: The Lady and the Unicorn – John Renbourn
- 1971: Bryter Layter – Nick Drake
- 1975: Bundles – Soft Machine (guest appearance)
- 1977: Reverie
- 1978: One Way – Tommy Chase-Ray Warleigh Quartet
- 1980: Land of Cockayne – Soft Machine
- 1980: Wonderin' – Rollercoaster
- 2009: Rue victor massé (Psi)

With Kenny Wheeler

- Dream Sequence (Psi, 1995–2003 [2003])
- What Was (Kenny Wheeler Sextet; False Walls, 2026; recorded 1995)
