= Roy Babbington =

English rock & jazz bassist (born 1940)

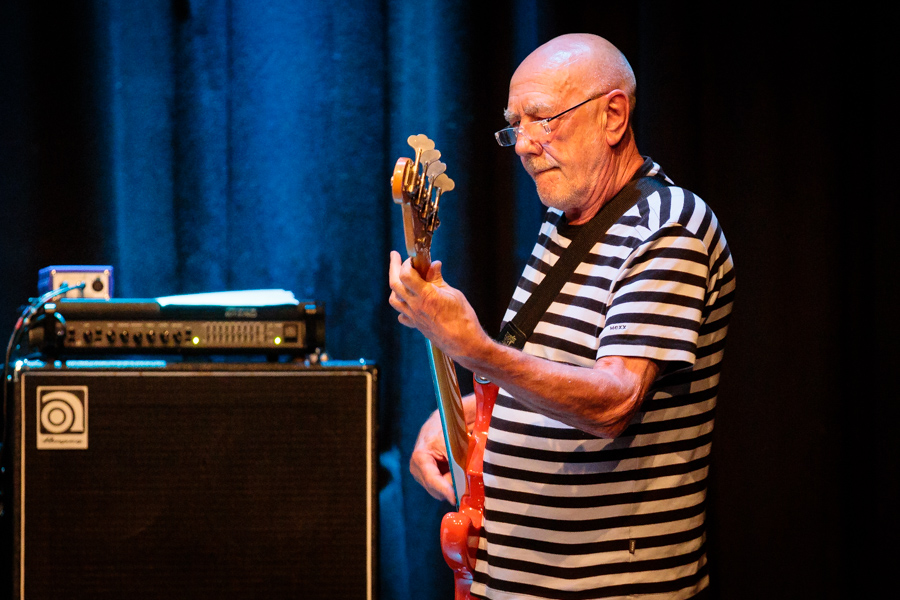
- Roy Babbington performing in 2018

Background information
- Born: 8 July 1940 (age 86); Kempston, Bedfordshire, England
- Genres: Jazz; jazz rock; progressive rock
- Occupation: Bassist
- Years active: 1958–2021
- Formerly of: The Leslie Thorpe Orchestra; Delivery; Centipede; Nucleus; Soft Machine; Soft Machine Legacy

Roy William Babbington (born 8 July 1940 in Kempston, Bedfordshire, England) is an English rock and jazz bassist. He became well known for being a member of the Canterbury scene progressive rock band Soft Machine.

== Biography ==
Babbington started his musical career in 1958, playing double bass in local jazz bands. At the age of 17, he took up the post of double bass, doubling on electric guitar (on such numbers as Cliff Richard's "Move It" on Monday's Rock 'n' Roll evening) with The Leslie Thorp Orchestra at the Aberdeen Beach Ballroom, where he honed his sight reading skills. After moving to London in 1969, he joined the band Delivery, one of the side roots of the Canterbury scene with Phil Miller, Pip Pyle and Lol Coxhill. Also, he began to work as a session musician with jazz/fusion musicians like Michael Gibbs and The Keith Tippett Group (including Elton Dean), appearing on their album Dedicated To You But You Weren't Listening (1970) as well as in Tippett's big band project Centipede (1971) and on Dean's album Just Us. When Delivery disbanded in 1971 after an album with Carol Grimes titled Fools Meeting, Babbington joined Nucleus.

He contributed to albums by Alexis Korner, Mike d'Abo, Chris Spedding, folk singers Harvey Andrews and Schunge, and was a part-time member of the bands Solid Gold Cadillac (jazz pianist's Mike Westbrook rock band) and Keith Tippett's Ovary Lodge.

=== With Soft Machine ===
Having already contributed additional double bass parts to electric bassist Hugh Hopper's work on the Soft Machine albums Fourth (1971) and Fifth (1972), he finally replaced Hopper fully in the band with the release of their album Seven. He used a six-string Fender VI throughout his tenure with the band. In addition to Seven, he can be heard on BBC Radio 1971-1974, Bundles, Softs and the library music project Rubber Riff (not actually a Soft Machine recording but featuring its members). Babbington's funk- and rock-oriented electric bass playing went along well with Karl Jenkins' and John Marshall's fusion concept of Soft Machine at the time.

=== After 1976 ===
After leaving Soft Machine, Babbington remained active on the UK jazz scene, playing with Barbara Thompson's Paraphernalia, Joe Gallivan's Intercontinental Express and various bands led by pianist Stan Tracey. In 1979, he appeared on the album Welcome to the Cruise by Judie Tzuke. In the 1980s and 1990s, he returned to his roots, double bass and pure jazz, and became affectionately know "the jazz handbrake". He also worked with Elvis Costello, Carol Grimes, Mose Allison and the BBC Big Band.

In 2008, he played with Soft Machine Legacy and again replaced Hugh Hopper as their electric bassist in 2009. Soft Machine Legacy changed their name back to just Soft Machine in 2015.

On 7 December 2021 Soft Machine issued a press release announcing that Babbington was retiring from the band, and was replaced by Fred Thelonious Baker on bass.

== Discography ==
=== As sideman ===
With Harvey Andrews

- In the Darkness & Soldier (Cube, 1972)
- Writer of Songs (Cube, 1972)
- Friends of Mine (Cube, 1973)

With Ian Carr

- Belladonna (Vertigo, 1972)
- Labyrinth (Vertigo, 1973)
- Exit 1971 (678 Records, 2020)

With Elvis Costello

- All This Useless Beauty (Warner Bros., 1996)
- Live (Rhino, 1996)
- Elvis Costello's Kojak Variety (Rhino, 2004)
- The Juliet Letters (Rhino, 2006)

With Soft Machine

- Fourth (CBS, 1971)
- Fifth (CBS, 1972)
- Seven (CBS, 1973)
- Bundles (Harvest, 1975)
- Softs (Harvest, 1976)
- Floating World Live (Moonjune, 2006)
- Live Adventures (Moonjune, 2010)
- Switzerland 1974 (Cuneiform, 2015)
- Hidden Details (Moonjune, 2018)
- Burden of Proof (Moonjune, 2013)
- Live at the Baked Potato (Dyad, 2020)

With Stan Tracey

- South East Assignment (Steam, 1980)
- The Crompton Suite (Steam, 1981)
- Stan Tracey Now (Steam, 1983)
- The Poets' Suite (Steam, 1984)
- Live at Ronnie Scotts (Steam, 1986)
- Stan Tracey Plays Duke Ellington (Mole Jazz, 1986)
- Genesis (Steam, 1987)
- We Still Love You Madly (Mole Jazz, 1989)

With others

- Mose Allison, The Mose Chronicles (Blue Note, 2001)
- BBC Big Band, Special Edition (Actionbyte, 1990)
- Harry Beckett, We Got It Made (Ogun, 1977)
- Madeline Bell, Try a Little Tenderness (Big Time, 2002)
- Dave Cartwright, Back to the Garden (Transatlantic, 1973)
- Centipede, Septober Energy (RCA, 1971)
- Cherry Vanilla, Venus D'Vinyl (RCA Victor, 1979)
- Graham Collier, The Day of the Dead (Mosaic, 1978)
- Mike Cooper, Trout Steel (Dawn, 1970)
- Mike d'Abo, D'Abo (Uni, 1970)
- John Dankworth, Prelude to a Kiss (Sepia, 1981)
- Elton Dean, Elton Dean (CBS, 1971)
- Geoff Eales, Mountains of Fire (Black Box Music, 1998)
- Geoff Eales, Facing the Muse (Mainstem, 2002)
- Keith Emerson, Off the Shelf (Castle Music, 2006)
- George Fenton & Trevor Preston, Fox the Album (EMI, 1980)
- Michael Gibbs, Just Ahead (Polydor, 1972)
- Carol Grimes, Fools Meeting (B&C, 1970)
- John Harle, Elvis Costello, Terror and Magnificence (Argo, 1996)
- Trevor Herion, Beauty Life (Interdisc, 1983)
- Mark Isham, Cool World (Varese Sarabande, 1992)
- Dave Jordan, Away from Home (Bradley, 1975)
- Jonathan Kelly, Wait Till They Change the Backdrop (RCA Victor, 1973)
- Alexis Korner, Bootleg Him! (Warner Bros., 1972)
- Vic Lewis, Vic Lewis Big Bands (Concept, 1988)
- Magna Carta, Prisoners On the Line (Philips, 1978)
- Jackie McAuley, Jackie McAuley (Dawn, 1971)
- Sal Nistico, Live in London (Steam, 1985)
- Nucleus, Live in Bremen (Cuneiform, 2003)
- Anna Oxa, Anna Oxa (RCA, 1979)
- Charlie Rouse, Playin' in the Yard (Steam, 1987)
- Alan Skidmore, East to West (Miles Music, 1992)
- Solid Gold Cadillac, Solid Gold Cadillac (RCA Victor, 1972)
- Chris Spedding, Backwood Progression (Harvest, 1970)
- Barbara Thompson, Barbara Thompson's Jubiaba (MCA, 1978)
- Barbara Thompson, Barbara Thompson's Paraphernalia (MCA, 1978)
- Keith Tippett, Dedicated to You but You Weren't Listening (Vertigo, 1971)
- Keith Tippett, Blueprint (RCA Victor, 1972)
- Judie Tzuke, Welcome to the Cruise (Rocket, 1979)
- Marlene VerPlanck, You Gotta Have Heart (Varese Sarabande, 1997)
- Andrew Lloyd Webber & Tim Rice, Evita (Polydor, 1978)
- Don Weller, Commit No Nuisance (Affinity, 1979)
- Gary Windo, Anglo American (Cuneiform, 2004)
- Robert Wyatt, Flotsam Jetsam (Rough Trade, 1994)
- The Yetties, Up Market (Decca, 1977)
- Chris Youlden, A British Blues Legend (London, 1979)
- Chris Youlden, Nowhere Road (London, 1973)

== Filmography ==
- 1996: Elvis Costello Live - A Case For Song (BBC)
- 2005: Mose Allison - Ever Since I Stole The Blues (BBC)
- 2015: Romantic Warriors III: Canterbury Tales (DVD)
