= Softs (album) =

Studio album by Soft Machine
- Released: June 1976
- Recorded: January to March, 1976 at EMI Abbey Road Studios, London
- Genre: Jazz rock
- Length: 44:55
- Label: Harvest
- Producer: Soft Machine

Soft Machine chronology
Bundles (1975)	Softs (1976)	Alive & Well: Recorded in Paris (1978)

Professional ratings
Review scores
Source	Rating
AllMusic	4/5 stars

Softs is the ninth studio album by the jazz rock band Soft Machine, released in 1976.

== Overview ==
John Etheridge replaced Allan Holdsworth on guitar shortly after the release of the previous album, Bundles, and Alan Wakeman, cousin of Yes keyboardist Rick Wakeman, took over saxophone duties from Karl Jenkins. Karl would play keyboards exclusively from this point onward. During the recording of the album, the group's last remaining original member, Mike Ratledge, left the band.

In 2019, Etheridge told Ed Masley that:

We came to record the album and Mike Ratledge never showed up. He had kind of been wanting to leave, he told me that. And I think the thought of making the album was the final straw, so he didn't show up. It didn't make a lot of difference, to tell you the truth, by then, which is a shame... But Karl Jenkins had sort of taken over and he was writing most of the music.

Two tracks recorded during the early sessions with Ratledge were included on the album. Wakeman and bassist Roy Babbington left the group not long after the album was released, Wakeman having been a member for less than six months. The album was originally to be titled One Over the Eight, a reference to this being the band's ninth album, but this title was eventually rejected.

== Track listing ==
All compositions by Karl Jenkins except where indicated.

Side one
No.	Title	Length
1.	"Aubade"	1:49
2.	"The Tale of Taliesin"	7:15
3.	"Ban-Ban Caliban"	9:19
4.	"Song of Aeolus"	4:29
Total length:		22:12

Side two
No.	Title	Length
5.	"Out of Season"	5:30
6.	"Second Bundle"	2:35
7.	"Kayoo" (John Marshall)	3:25
8.	"The Camden Tamdem" (John Etheridge, John Marshall)	1:50
9.	"Nexus"	0:47
10.	"One Over the Eight" (Karl Jenkins, John Marshall, John Etheridge, Alan Wakeman, Roy Babbington)	5:26
11.	"Etika" (John Etheridge)	2:21
Total length:		20:34 42:46

== Personnel ==
Soft Machine

- Roy Babbington – bass guitar
- John Etheridge – acoustic and electric guitars
- John Marshall – drums, percussion
- Alan Wakeman – soprano and tenor saxophones
- Karl Jenkins – piano, electric piano, Hohner Pianet, Minimoog and string synthesizers, orchestrations

Additional musician

- Mike Ratledge – synthesizer (3, 4)
