= Theo Travis =

British saxophonist, flautist and composer (born 1964)

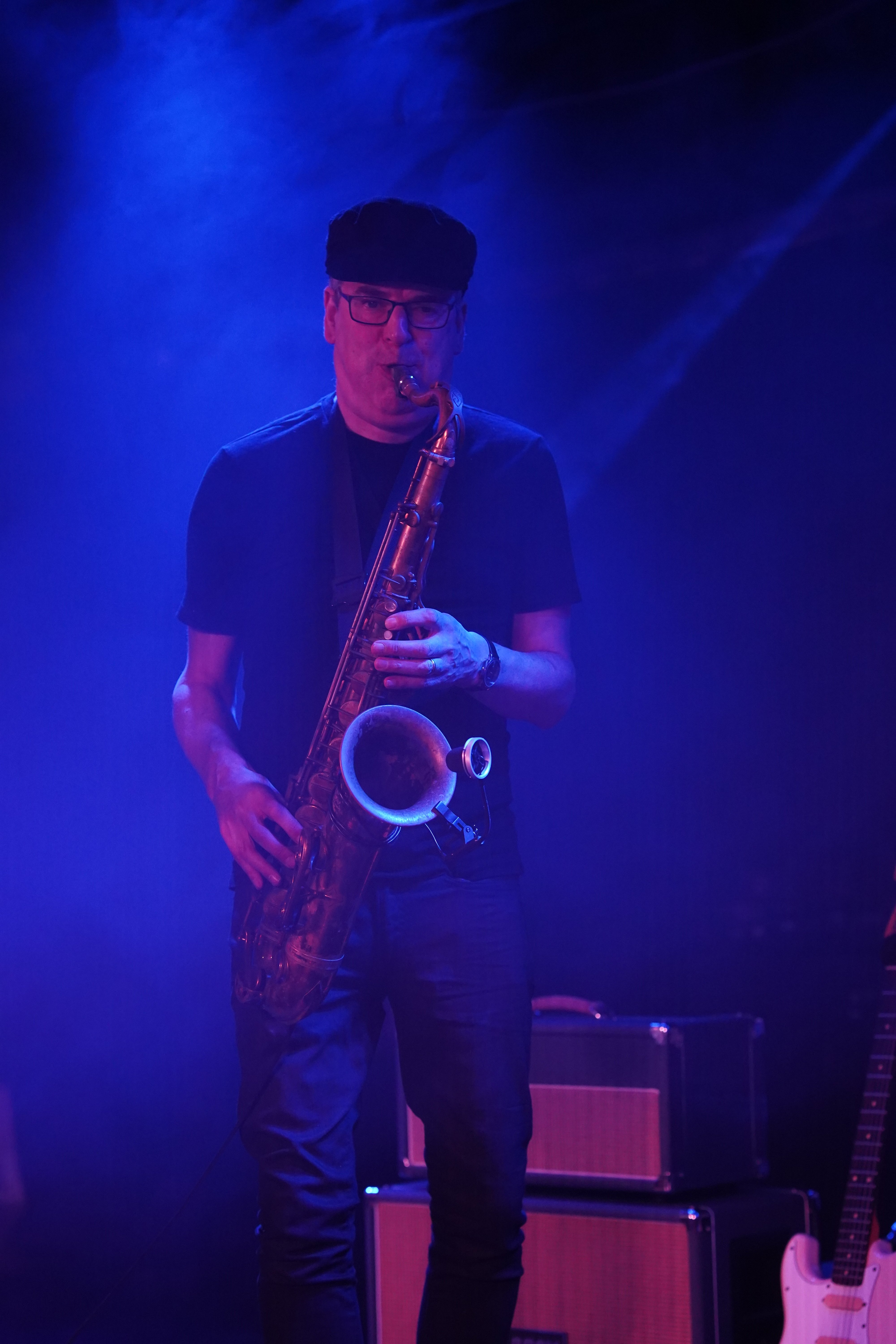
- Travis performing with The Tangent in 2023

Background information
- Born: 7 July 1964 (age 62); Birmingham, England
- Genres: Jazz rock; experimental rock; progressive rock; ambient rock
- Occupation: Musician
- Instruments: Saxophone; flute; keyboards
- Years active: 1993–present
- Label: 33 Jazz
- Member of: Soft Machine; The Tangent
- Formerly of: King Crimson; David Gilmour; Gong; Travis & Fripp
- Website: theotravis.com

Theo Travis (born 7 July 1964) is a British saxophonist, flautist and composer. He is a member of Soft Machine which he joined in 2006 while the group was still using the "Legacy" suffix and was a member of Gong from 1999 to 2010.

== Biography ==
Travis received his degree in music from the University of Manchester specialising in the works of Shostakovich. He has released eleven solo albums, largely as a band leader in the jazz genre, creating and arranging the majority of the material. However, 2003's Slow Life, on which he is the sole performer, is an ambient album employing loops which prefigures his later work with Travis & Fripp. He has made about the same number of albums again credited to himself and one (or occasionally more) other collaborator(s), including John Foxx and, as half of Travis & Fripp with Robert Fripp.

On his albums as band leader, Travis has played with numerous other jazz musicians. These have included, on his 2007 album Double Talk, guitarist Mike Outram and organist Pete Whittaker. There was no bassist as such on that album: like many Hammond organists, Whittaker plays the bass parts with his left hand and his left foot on the pedals. Robert Fripp also guested on two tracks on this album, one of which he co-wrote with Travis. Owing to other collaborative commitments, Travis did not record another jazz album for eight years. When he did so in 2015, he named his new band Theo Travis' Double Talk after the 2007 album. This new band again included both Outram and Whittaker, with the addition of Nic France on drums.

In 1993, Travis worked alongside bassist Dave Sturt on the Jade Warrior album Distant Echoes - as they would again on that band's 2008 album NOW. The pair worked together in the four-piece jazz fusion band The Other Side, releasing the album Dangerous Days in 1994, and, since 1999, with varying guest musicians in their band Cipher which collaborated with Bill Nelson in both the latter's improvisational three-piece live band Orchestra Futura and his more conventional, seven-piece rock band Bill Nelson and the Gentlemen Rocketeers. Sturt was also an engineer on Travis & Fripp's 2014 album Discretion.

In 2006, Travis joined Soft Machine Legacy, a project based on personnel and works of the band Soft Machine, replacing saxophonist Elton Dean after his death. Since 2008 he has worked with guitarist Robert Fripp in the duo Travis and Fripp, releasing four CDs to date, as well as three live concerts as downloads through DGMLive (two of them also on vinyl through Tonefloat). Travis has also worked extensively with Steven Wilson, performing on fifteen of his records and with Wilson mixing six of Travis' releases. Travis appears extensively as featured soloist on Wilson's Grammy nominated album Grace for Drowning and is part of his touring live band. In 2014, using kickstarter funding, he self-published the book Twice Around The World: Steven Wilson Tour Blogs 2012-2013 which included edited entries previously published on Travis' Facebook page, and was illustrated with photographs from the tour.

Travis has also worked with Harold Budd, Bass Communion, Fear Falls Burning/Dirk Serries, Burnt Friedman, Gong, No-Man, Porcupine Tree, The Tangent, Tim Bowness, John Jowitt, Andy Edwards, Matt Stevens of The Fierce and the Dead,Dave and Richard Sinclair, David Sylvian and David Gilmour.

== Awards ==
Travis' album View From the Edge was voted Best British Jazz CD of 1994 by a Jazz on CD Critics/Readers poll.

== Discography ==
=== Solo albums ===
- 2am (1993) 33 Jazz
- View From the Edge (1994) "Best British Jazz CD 1994" 33 Jazz
- Secret Island (1996) 33 Jazz
- Passion Dance - Live at Ronnie's (1999) [Theo Travis Quartet] RSJH - Ronnie Scott's Jazz House
- Heart of the Sun (2001) 33 Jazz
- Slow Life (2003) Ether Sounds
- Earth to Ether (2004) 33 Jazz
- View From the Edge (Deluxe Edition) (2004) contains 2nd CD with alternative takes and remixes 33 Jazz
- Double Talk (2007) 33 Jazz
- Transgression (2015) [Theo Travis' Double Talk] Esoteric Recordings
- Open Air (2017) vinyl only Tonefloat
- Songs From the Apricot Tree (2021)
- The Dark Hours (2023)
- Ancient Soul, Modern Times: One Hour Duduk Meditation (2023)
- Inner Sun: One Hour Duduk Meditation (2024)
- Ocean of Heaven (2025)
- One Rainy Night (2026)
- In A Timeless Place (2026)

=== Solo collaboration albums ===
- Bodywork (1998) Marshall Travis Wood:] 33 Jazz
- Berlin Vibe (2001) [Travis/Beaujolais Quartet] Symbol
- Guerrilla Music (2002) [Theo Travis/Mark Hewins] Burning Shed
- For the Love of Open Spaces (2003) Steve Lawson/Theo Travis] Pillow Mountain
- Eleven Bowls of Acidophilus Flute Salad 2000/2001 (2006) all tracks improvised live on the Gong Zero To Infinity Tour vinyl only Tonefloat
- Thread (2008) [Travis & Fripp] Panegyric
- The Tonefloat Sessions (2009) [Travis & Fear Falls Burning]vinyl only Tonefloat
- All Saints Church, Broad Chalke, UK live recording (21 May 2009) [Travis & Fripp] vinyl Tonefloat, download DGMLive
- St. Michael & All Saints, Bishop's Cleeve, UK live recording (22 May 2009) [Travis & Fripp] vinyl Tonefloat, download DGMLive
- Teatro Echegaray, Málaga, Spain live recording (30 April 2010) [Travis & Fripp] download only DGMLive
- Live at Coventry Cathedral (2010) [Travis & Fripp] Panegyric
- Torn Sunset (2011) [Theo Travis and John Foxx] Edsel
- Follow (2012) [Travis & Fripp] Panegyric
- Discretion (2014) [Travis & Fripp] Panegyric
- Windjammer (2014) [Echo Engine with Theo Travis] Blue Serene Focus
- Aeolus: One Hour Duduk Meditation (2024) [Theo Travis and Steven Wilson] Panegyric

=== Solo compilation albums ===
- All I Know (2010) 33 Jazz

=== with Soft Machine ===
Studio

- Steam (as Soft Machine Legacy) (2007) Moonjune
- Burden of Proof (as Soft Machine Legacy) (2013) Moonjune
- Hidden Details (2018) Moonjune
- Other Doors (2023)

Live

- Live Adventures (as Soft Machine Legacy) (2010) Moonjune
- Live At The Baked Potato (2020) Tonefloat

=== Collaboration albums ===
- Distant Echoes (1993) Jade Warrior Red Hot
- Dangerous Days (1994) [The Other Side] Bridge
- Celtic Steppes (1996) Dick Heckstall-Smith 33 Jazz
- Gaddy Zerbib (1996) [Gaddy Zerbib] Zerbib
- Under African Skies (1996) [Jive Nation] Bridge
- Truth (1997) Sugizo Polygram/Cross
- _ism (1998) Jansen Barbieri Karn (JBK)] Medium Productions Limited
- Forest People (1998) Masami Tsuchiya Polygram/Cross
- Bass Communion (1998) Bass Communion 3rd Stone
- Indigo Falls (1998) Indigo Falls (Medium Productions Limited)
- It's out there (1998) [The Great Unknown] Infinity
- Stupid Dream (1999) Porcupine Tree Kscope
- Bass Communion 2 (1999) [Bass Communion] Hidden Art
- Pulse (1999) Yukihiro Takahashi/Steve Jansen Con - Sipio
- No Ordinary Man (1999) Cipher Hidden Art
- Zero to Infinity (2000) Gong Snapper Music
- Live 2 Infinitea (2000) [Gong] Snapper Music
- Beloved (2001) Akiko Kobayashi Warner Japan
- Smiling and Waving (2001) Anja Garbarek Virgin Norway
- Playing in a room with people (2001) [Jansen Barbieri Karn (JBK)] live album Medium Productions Limited
- Recordings (2001) [Porcupine Tree] Kscope/Snapper Music
- Bass Communion 3 (2001) [Bass Communion] Burning Shed
- Solar Sahara (2001) [Recreator] FMR
- Lost Songs, Volume One (2001) No-Man Burning Shed
- Returning Jesus (2001) [No-Man] 3rd Stone
- Blake (2001) [Rod Blake] Candid
- Tito Rides In (2001) [Tito Lopez Combo] Acid Jazz
- One Who Whispers (2002) [Cipher] Gliss
- OK Friends (2002) [Gong] Gas
- From Here to Eternity (2-CD reissue) (2002) [Gong] Snapper Music
- Into the Sun (2003) David Sinclair DSINCS-Music
- Full Circle (2003) [David Sinclair] DSINCS-Music
- Meditations (2003) Uri Geller Forkbender
- Words of Courage and Inspiration (2003) [Uri Geller] Forkbender
- The Sky Moves Sideways Reissue (2003) [Porcupine Tree] Delerium
- House of Thandoy (2003) [House of Thandoy] Not On Label - HOT1 CDr only
- Harbans Srih's Vybesmen (2003) [Harbans Srih's Vybesmen] Tito
- Bass Communion remixed (2003) [Bass Communion / Various] Headphone Dust
- All that you are (2003) [No-Man] Hidden Art EP
- Surfacing (2004) [A Marble Calm] Burning Shed
- The World That We Drive Through (2004) The Tangent Inside Out
- Unreleased Electronic Music Volume 1 (2004) Steven Wilson Headphone Dust
- Ghosts on magnetic tape (2004) [Bass Communion] Headphone Dust
- Still Smokin' (2004) Tito Lopez Combo Tito's
- Taste (2004) [Karen Lane] 33 Jazz
- Elemental Forces (2005) [Cipher] Burning Shed
- Snow Bourne Sorrow (2005) [Nine Horses (David Sylvian/Steve Jansen/Burnt Friedman)] SamadhiSound
- Indicates Void (2005) [Bass Communion] vinyl only Tonefloat
- A Place in the Queue (2006) [The Tangent] Inside Out
- So Many Reasons (2006) John Lester Midnite Cafe
- Stupid Dream (2006) [Porcupine Tree] Special Edition 2-CD set Lava/Atlantic
- Where You Go (2007) Cary Grace Door 13 Music
- Who's the Boss in the Factory? (2008) Karmakanic Inside Out
- NOW (2008) [Jade Warrior] Windweaver Music
- Not as Good as the Book (2008) [The Tangent] Inside Out
- Schoolyard Ghosts (2008) [No-Man] Kscope/Snapper Music
- Pacific Codex (2008) [Bass Communion] Headphone Dust
- Still Life in Mobile Homes (2009) Francis Dunnery Aquarian Nation
- 2032 (2009) [Gong] (G-Wave)
- A Rose (2009) [Stefano Panunzi] Emerald Recordings
- the seven dreams (2010) [goldbug] 1K Recordings
- Grace for Drowning (2011) [Steven Wilson] Kscope
- Catalogue / Preserve / Amass (Live In Europe, October 2011) (2012) [Steven Wilson] Headphone Dust, Kscope
- The Raven that Refused to Sing (And Other Stories) (2013) [Steven Wilson] Kscope
- Nacaal (2014) [goldbug] 1K Recordings
- Hand. Cannot. Erase. (2015) [Steven Wilson] Kscope
- Dreams And Absurdities (2015) Dave Sturt Esoteric/Antenna
- Until All The Ghosts Are Gone (2015) Anekdoten VIRTA
- The Overview (2025) [Steven Wilson] Fiction

=== Collaboration singles and EPs ===
- Piano Lessons c/w Ambulance Chasing (1999) [Porcupine Tree] Kscope
- Stranger by the minute c/w Even Less (pt 2) (2000) [Porcupine Tree] Kscope
- Les Pensées De Nos Rêves EP (2002) [Inconnu] (Over Records)

=== Collaboration DVDs ===
- High above the Subterranea Club 2000 (2002) [Gong] live album Snapper Music
- Classic Rock Magazine Legends filmed live at Metropolis Studios (2011) Bill Nelson and the Gentlemen Rocketeers] ITV Studios Home Entertainment
- The Raven that Refused to Sing (And Other Stories) CD+DVD (2013) [Steven Wilson] Kscope

=== Tracks on solo albums ===
- "Psychogroove Reconstruction/Remix" [Cipher] on View From the Edge (Deluxe Edition) 2nd CD with alternative takes and remixes (2004) 33 Jazz Records

=== Tracks on collaboration albums ===
- "Life Without Buildings" live, also features Steven Wilson on Medium Label Sampler (2000) [Jansen Barbieri Karn (JBK)] Medium Productions Limited
- The DAC Mixes (2003) [Darkroom] CDr Burning Shed
- "Sleepyard", "Gap Of Cloud", "A Way Of Disappearing", "Ballad Of A Deadman" and "Conversation Over" on Slope (2007) Steve Jansen SamadhiSound

=== Tracks on compilation albums ===
- 'three breaths' on Under The External (1997) [Ute] Id/Mercury Polygram
- "Lulworth Night" on Velvet Smooth Moods 2 (1999) [Various Artists] Jazz FM Records
- "Like A Child" [No-Man] and "White Cloud, Blue Sky" [Cipher] on The Sky Goes All The Way Home (1999) [Various Artists] Voiceprint
- "Drugged" remix [Bass Communion] on Remixes (2000) [Silver Apples] 3rd Stone
- DJ Spooky and Steve Jansen tracks on Pulse + Pulse Remix (2000) [Yukihiro Takahashi, Steve Jansen] Medium Productions Limited
- "The Lodger pt 2" [Cipher] exclusive track plus "16 Second Swarm" [Bass Communion], "No Ordinary Man" [Cipher] on Hidden Art Sampler (2000) [Various] Hidden Art
- "Quantico" [Bass Communion] on Invisible Soundtracks Macro 3 (2000) [Various] Leaf
- "Slow Life" [Theo Travis/Mark Hewins] on Burning Shed - Sampler Two (2002) [Various] CDr Burning Shed

=== Tracks on compilation 12" ===
- "All Things" [Aphratec] on The Discerning Dancefloor - Volume One (2002) [Various] vinyl only Care in the Community Records

== Bibliography ==
- Travis, Theo Twice Around The World: Steven Wilson Tour Blogs 2012-2013 (2014) includes entries previously published on Travis' Facebook page, here re-edited self-published

== Filmography ==
- 2015: Romantic Warriors III: Canterbury Tales (DVD)
