= Stu Calver =

British musician

Stuart 'Stu' Calver was a British (born 1946) musician who died 3 October 2000 at the age of 54. He had cystic fibrosis. He is best known for his work as a backing vocalist with the singer Cliff Richard.
