= Seven (Soft Machine album) =

- 1973 cover

Studio album by Soft Machine
- Released: October 1973
- Recorded: CBS Studios, London, July 1973
- Genre: Jazz fusion
- Length: 43:15
- Labels: CBS (UK), Columbia (USA)
- Producer: Soft Machine

Soft Machine chronology
Six (1973)	Seven (1973)	Bundles (1975)

Professional ratings
Review scores
Source	Rating
AllMusic	3/5 stars
Christgau's Record Guide	C+

Seven is the seventh studio album by the jazz rock band Soft Machine, released in 1973. Bassist Roy Babbington, who had previously worked with the band as a session musician on the Fourth (1971) and Fifth (1972) albums, joined the band as a full-time member, replacing Hugh Hopper, who left to begin a solo career. This line-up change meant more than half of Soft Machine was now former members of the band Nucleus.

== Overview ==
The album was issued on CBS Records with a colour gatefold cover in the UK, with black and white photos of the band members on the inside cover. In the USA, Columbia Records released a single sleeve cover that moved the band photos to the front. The title on the USA front cover is the numeral 7, but is spelled out as Seven on the spine and label. Although this is a 1973 release, USA copies show a copyright date of 1974 (and a phonographic rights date of 1973), suggesting the North American release may have been delayed. It was the last of their studio releases to carry a numbered title until the release of the album Thirteen in 2026.

The titles of the final two tracks are clearly intended as a joke. The preceding track, "Down the Road", fades into a swirling abstract jumble of notes on keyboards which plays with little variation for three minutes before fading out, and there is nothing musically to indicate the transition from German to French lessons, and no explanation as to why these two tracks are credited to different composers.

== Track listing ==
=== Side one ===
No.	Title	Writer(s)	Length
1.	"Nettle Bed"	Karl Jenkins	4:47
2.	"Carol Ann"	Jenkins	3:48
3.	"Day's Eye"	Mike Ratledge	5:05
4.	"Bone Fire"	Ratledge	0:32
5.	"Tarabos"	Ratledge	4:32
6.	"D.I.S."	John Marshall	3:02

=== Side two ===
No.	Title	Writer(s)	Length
1.	"Snodland"	Jenkins	1:50
2.	"Penny Hitch"	Jenkins	6:40
3.	"Block"	Jenkins	4:17
4.	"Down the Road"	Jenkins	5:48
5.	"The German Lesson"	Ratledge	1:53
6.	"The French Lesson"	Jenkins	1:01

== Personnel ==
Soft Machine

- Karl Jenkins – oboe, baritone and soprano saxophones, recorder, Fender Rhodes & Hohner Pianet electric pianos
- Mike Ratledge – Fender Rhodes electric piano, Lowrey Holiday Deluxe organ, EMS Synthi AKS synthesizer
- Roy Babbington – bass guitar, acoustic bass
- John Marshall – drums, percussion
