= Bundles (album) =

1975 instrumental studio album by Soft Machine

Studio album by Soft Machine
- Released: March 1975
- Recorded: July 1974 at CBS Whitfield St Studios, London
- Genre: Jazz rock
- Length: 41:55
- Label: Harvest
- Producer: Soft Machine

Soft Machine chronology
Seven (1973)	Bundles (1975)	Softs (1976)

Professional ratings
Review scores
Source	Rating
AllMusic	4/5 stars
Music Week	2/4 stars

Bundles is the eighth studio album by the jazz-rock band Soft Machine, released in 1975.

== Overview ==
By the time of Bundles, most of Soft Machine's members had previously been part of the jazz-rock band Nucleus, the exception being keyboardist Mike Ratledge, who at this point was the only remaining original member of Soft Machine. Guitarist Allan Holdsworth's prominent contributions set the album apart from previous Soft Machine recordings, which rarely featured guitar.

Bundles is the band's last full studio album recorded with Ratledge. Only two compositions by him are included, one of which is less than two minutes long. He left the band during the early sessions for the next album Softs, leaving the band with no original members.

== Track listing ==
All compositions by Karl Jenkins except where indicated.

Side one
No.	Title	Length
1.	"Hazard Profile Part One"	9:18
2.	"Hazard Profile Part Two (Toccatina)"	2:21
3.	"Hazard Profile Part Three"	0:33
4.	"Hazard Profile Part Four"	1:25
5.	"Hazard Profile Part Five"	5:29
6.	"Gone Sailing" (Allan Holdsworth)	0:59
Total length:		20:05

Side two
No.	Title	Length
7.	"Bundles"	3:14
8.	"Land of the Bag Snake" (Holdsworth)	3:35
9.	"The Man Who Waved at Trains" (Mike Ratledge)	1:50
10.	"Peff" (Ratledge)	3:37
11.	"Four Gongs Two Drums" (John Marshall)	2:31
12.	"The Floating World"	7:07
Total length:		21:54 41:59

== Personnel ==
Soft Machine

- Karl Jenkins – oboe, soprano saxophone, acoustic & electric piano
- Allan Holdsworth – electric, acoustic and 12-string guitars
- Mike Ratledge – Fender Rhodes electric piano, Lowrey Holiday Deluxe organ, EMS Synthi AKS synthesizer
- Roy Babbington – bass guitar
- John Marshall – drums, percussion

Additional musician

- Ray Warleigh – alto flute and bass flute on "The Floating World"
