= John Marshall (drummer) =

English drummer (1941–2023)

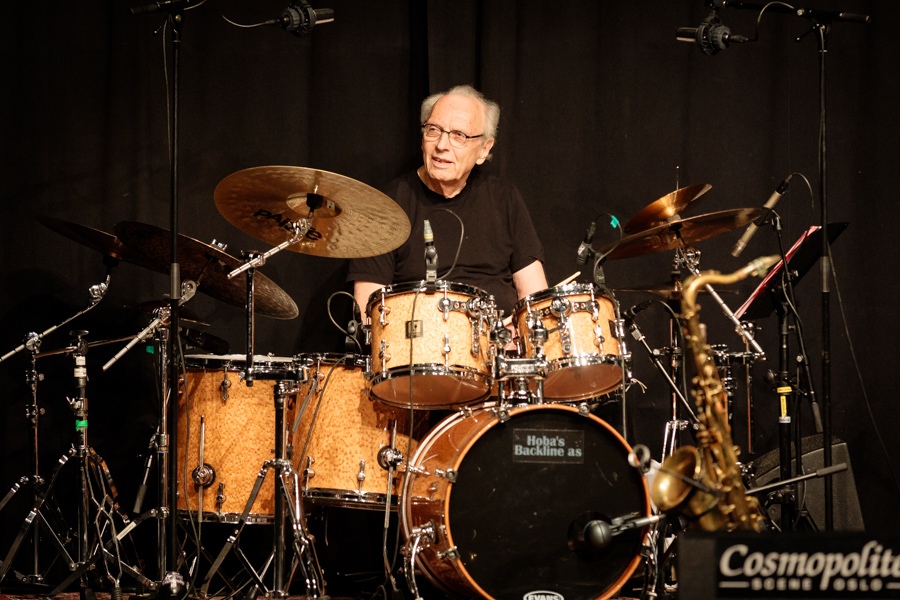
- Marshall in 2018

Background information
- Born: John Stanley Marshall; 28 August 1941; Isleworth, Middlesex, England
- Died: 16 September 2023 (aged 82)
- Genres: Jazz fusion; rock; world
- Occupation: Musician
- Instrument: Drums
- Years active: 1967–2023
- Formerly of: Nucleus; Soft Machine; Soft Machine Legacy

John Stanley Marshall (28 August 1941 – 16 September 2023) was an English drummer and founding member of the jazz rock band Nucleus. He is most well known as the drummer for Soft Machine and its asscociated acts from 1972 until his retirement from the group in 2022.

== Biography ==
Marshall was born in Isleworth, Middlesex on 28 August 1941, and worked with various jazz and rock bands and musicians, among them J. J. Jackson, Allan Holdsworth, Barney Kessel, Alexis Korner, Graham Collier, Michael Gibbs, Arthur Brown, Keith Tippett, Centipede, Jack Bruce, John McLaughlin, Dick Morrissey, Hugh Hopper, Elton Dean, John Surman, Charlie Mariano, John Abercrombie, Arild Andersen, and Eberhard Weber's Colours.

From 1999, he worked with former Soft Machine co-musicians in several Soft Machine-related projects like SoftWare, SoftWorks and Soft Machine Legacy. He toured as a member of the band, which operated under the name Soft Machine again, from 2015 to 2023.

Marshall died on 16 September 2023, at the age of 82.

== Discography ==
=== with Nucleus ===
- Elastic Rock (1970, Vertigo)
- We'll Talk About It Later (1971, Vertigo)
- Solar Plexus (1971, Vertigo)
- Live at Theaterhaus (1985, Mood)
- Ian Carr: Old Heartland (1988, EMI)

=== with Soft Machine ===
Studio

- Fifth (1972, CBS)
- Six (1973, CBS)
- Seven (1973, CBS)
- Bundles (1975, Harvest)
- Softs (1976, Harvest)
- Land of Cockayne (1981, EMI)
- Abracadabra (as Soft Works) (2003, Tone Center, MoonJune Records)
- Soft Machine Legacy (as Soft Machine Legacy) (2006, Moonjune Records)
- Steam (as Soft Machine Legacy) (2007, Moonjune Records)
- Burden of Proof (as Soft Machine Legacy) (2013, Moonjune Records)
- Hidden Details (2018, Moonjune Records)
- Other Doors (2023, Moonjune Records)

Live

- NDR Jazz Workshop - Live (1973, Cuneiform)
- Switzerland Live (recorded 1974, released 2015, Cuneiform)
- Floating World Live (recorded 1975, released 2006, Moonjune Records)
- British Tour '75 (recorded 1975, released 2005, Major League Productions)
- Alive & Well: Recorded in Paris (1978, Harvest)
- BBC Radio 1 Live in Concert [rec.1972] (1994, Windsong)
- Live in France [recorded 1972] (1994, One Way)
- Live in Zaandam (as Soft Machine Legacy) (2005, Moonjune Records)
- Live At The New Morning (as Soft Machine Legacy) (2006, in-akustik)
- Live Adventures (as Soft Machine Legacy) (2010, Moonjune Records)
- Live at the Baked Potato (2019, Moonjune Records)
- Abracadabra In Osaka (as Soft Works) (2020, Moonjune Records)

=== with Eberhard Weber's Colours ===
- Silent Feet (ECM, 1977)
- Pop Jazz International (Amiga, 1979)
- Little Movements (ECM, 1980)

=== with Centipede ===
- Septober Energy (Neon/RCA, 1971)

=== As sideman ===
With Jack Bruce

- Songs for a Tailor (Polydor Records, 1969)
- Harmony Row (Atco, 1971)

With John Surman

- Conflagration (Dawn, 1971)
- Morning Glory (Island, 1973)
- The Brass Project (ECM, 1992)
- Stranger than Fiction (ECM, 1993)

With Vassilis Tsabropoulos

- Achirana (ECM, 1999)

With others

- Graham Collier/Deep Dark Blue Centre (1967, Deram)
- Michael Garrick/Jazz Praises at St Paul's (1968, Airborne)
- Barney Kessel/Blue Soul (1968, Black Lion)
- Barney Kessel/Swinging Easy (1968, Black Lion)
- Graham Collier/Down Another Road (1969, Fontana)
- Neil Ardley/Greek Variations (1969, Columbia)
- Jack Bruce/Songs for a Tailor (1969, Polydor)
- Michael Gibbs/Michael Gibbs (1969, Deram)
- Mike Westbrook/Marching Song Vol. I & II (1969, Deram)
- Georgie Fame/Seventh Son (1969, CBS)
- Arthur Brown/Crazy World of Arthur Brown (1969, Track)
- Indo-Jazz Fusions/Etudes (1969, Sonet)
- Lloyd Webber/Rice/Jesus Christ Superstar (1970, Decca)
- Bill Fay/Bill Fay (1970, Deram)
- Mike d'Abo/Michael D'Abo (1970, Uni)
- Chris Spedding/Songs Without Words (1970, Harvest)
- Top Topham/Ascension Heights (1970, Blue Horizon)
- Michael Gibbs/Tanglewood '63 (1970, Deram)
- Chitinous Ensemble/Chitinous Ensemble (1971, Deram)
- Linda Hoyle/Pieces of Me (1971, Vertigo)
- Spontaneous Music Orchestra/Live: Big Band/Quartet (1971, Vinyl)
- Mike Westbrook/Metropolis (1971, RCA)
- Centipede/Septober Energy (1971, Neo)
- Michael Gibbs/Just Ahead (1972, Polydor)
- Alexis Korner/Bootleg Him (1972, Rak Srak)
- Volker Kriegel/Inside:The Missing Link (1972, MPS)
- Hugh Hopper/1984 (1973, CBS)
- John Williams/Height Below (1973, Hi Fly)
- Volker Kriegel/Lift (1973, MPS)
- Pork Pie (Van 't Hof. Mariano, Catherine, Marshall)/The Door is Open (1975, MPS)
- Charlie Mariano/HelenTwelveTrees (1976, MPS)
- Elton Dean & Alan Skidmore/El Skid (1977, Vinyl)
- Jasper van 't Hof & George Gruntz/Fairy Tales (1978, MPS)
- Gil Evans/The British Orchestra (1983, Mole)
- Uli Beckerhoff, Jasper van 't Hof, John Marshall/Camporondo (1986, Nabel)
- Uli Beckerhoff, John Abercrombie, Arild Andersen, John Marshall/Secret Obsession (1991, Nabel)
- Wolfgang Mirbach/Links (1992, Schlozzton)
- Towering Inferno/Kaddish (1993, Tl Records)
- Michael Gibbs/By The Way (1994, Ah Um)
- Theo Travis/View From The Edge (1994, 33 Records)
- Jandl/Glawischnig/Laut & Luise (1995, Hat Hut/Du)
- Graham Collier/Charles River Fragments (1995, Boathouse)
- Mirbach/Links/New Reasons to Use Old Words (1995, Schlozzton)
- Jack Bruce & Friends/Live in Concert [rec.1971] (1995, Windsong)
- Christoph Oeding/Taking a Chance (1997, Mons)
- Marshall Travis Wood/Bodywork (1998, 33 Records)
- Roy Powell/North by Northwest (1998, released 2001, Nagel-Heyer)
