= Insight (disambiguation) =

Insight is the act or result of apprehending the inner nature of things or of seeing intuitively.

Insight may also refer to:

== Film and television ==
- InSight (2011 film), an American mystery drama film
- Insight (2021 film), an American action film
- Insight (Australian TV program), a current affairs talk programme
- Insight (American TV series), an American religious syndicated program
- Insights (TV series), a public affairs program based in Dallas, Texas, US
- Insight Communications, a cable television company in the Midwest U.S.
- Insight Sports, a media company in Canada that operates several specialty channels

== Media and journalism ==
- Insight (Adventist magazine)
- Insight (Sunday Times), an investigation team for The Sunday Times newspaper
- Insights (FARMS), a 1981–2013 newsletter for the Foundation for Ancient Research and Mormon Studies
- InSight Crime, a non-profit journalism and consultancy organization on organized crime
- Insight Guides, a travel and map guide series based in the UK
- Insight on the News, an American conservative Internet magazine formerly owned by Sun Myung Moon's Unification Church
- INSIGHT (skepticism), blog of The Skeptics Society

== Music ==
- Insight (Prince Lasha album) (1966)
- Insight (Maciek Pysz album) (2013)
- Insights (album), a 1976 album by Toshiko Akiyoshi – Lew Tabackin Big Band
- "Insight", a 1980 song by Joy Division from Unknown Pleasures

== Sports and recreation ==
- Insight Bowl, a college football bowl played in Tempe, Arizona
- Project Insight, a division of the San Francisco, California Recreation & Park Department that provides programs for young people with hearing or vision impairments

== Technology ==
- InSight, a NASA spacecraft landed on Mars in 2018
- Insight (email client), a groupware email client
- Honda Insight, Honda's first mass production hybrid vehicle
- Norton Insight, a whitelisting technology present in Symantec's 2009 and 2010 range of antivirus software
- Insight Enterprises, a NASDAQ listed IT computer reseller based in Tempe, Arizona
- Insight Technology, a company that produces flashlights for mounting on weapons
- Hard X-ray Modulation Telescope or Insight, a Chinese X-ray space observatory

== Other uses ==
- Insight (public organization), a Ukrainian LGBTQI organization
- Insight Credit Union, a credit union based in Florida, United States
- Insight Global, an employment agency
- Institute for the Study and Integration of Graphical Heritage Techniques
- International Network for Strategic Initiatives in Global HIV Trials

== See also ==
- Bodhi
- Insite, a supervised drug injection site in North America
- Vipassanā
- Wisdom in Buddhism or Prajna
- Incite (disambiguation)
