= A Journey (album) =

Studio album by Maciek Pysz
- Released: October 2015
- Recorded: 16–19 December 2014
- Studio: Artesuono Studios, Udine, Italy
- Genre: Jazz
- Label: Dot Time Records
- Producer: Stefano Amerio

A Journey is an album by jazz musician Maciek Pysz, released in October 2015 on Dot Time Records. All tracks are composed by Pysz, except track 6, which is composed by Ralph Towner and 11 which is jointly composed and arranged by Maciek Pysz and Gianluca Corona.

== Reception ==
A Journey received universally favourable reviews. The critic Stephen Graham proclaimed:

With a pastoral sound Pysz plays mainly his own gently persuasive compositions plus a version of Ralph Towner song ‘Innocente’, and there’s a delicate humanity to the atmosphere throughout, sometimes touching on Pat Metheny territory by cleverly harnessing complex acoustic melodic lines underpinned by a very emotion-laden but uncloying sense of harmony. ... There is some beautiful stuff here – a must for jazz guitar fans.

— Graham, Stephen (9 October 2015). "Maciek Pysz, A Journey". Marlbank Reviews. Archived from the original on 11 October 2015.

Ian Mann said:

Pysz is a quiet virtuoso who has developed into one of the most distinctive guitarists around.

— Mann, Ian (10 November 2015). "Maciek Pysz, A Journey". The Jazz Mann.

In London Jazz News, Adrian Pallant wrote:

the crisp balance of sound and space in this recording is flawless. Throughout, it's great to witness the development of Maciek Pysz's own musical personality.

— Pallant, Adrian (29 October 2015). "CD review: Maciek Pysz – A Journey". London Jazz News. Archived from the original on 17 November 2015.

Adam Baruch wrote:

There is no doubt that this is an amazing album, full of musical beauty, aesthetic pleasure and extraordinary musicianship, an album that has only a very few equals among the numerous other albums released on a world scale.

— Baruch, Adam (29 November 2015). "Maciek Pysz – A Journey (2015)". Adam Baruch Polish Jazz Blogspot.

== Track listing ==
All compositions by Maciek Pysz except track 6, "Innocente", which is by Ralph Towner and track 11 which is by Maciek Pysz and Gianluca Corona

1. Fresh Look – 5:27
2. Water Streets – 6:07
3. I Saw You Again – 8:03
4. Story Of A Story – 4:34
5. Paris – 3:19
6. Innocente – 4:38
7. Undeniable – 8:25
8. Until New Time – 4:26
9. Always On The Move – 3:14
10. Peacefully Waiting – 6:15
11. Desert – 6:53
12. Coming Home – 5:44

== Personnel ==
- Maciek Pysz – acoustic guitar and classical guitar
- Yuri Goloubev – Bass and Piano track 9
- Asaf Sirkis – Drums and percussion
- Daniele di Bonaventura – bandoneon and piano
- Produced and arranged by Maciek Pysz
- Recorded 16–19 December 2014 at Artesuono Studios, Udine, Italy
- Recorded, mixed and mastered by Stefano Amerio
- Photography by Tim Dickeson and Daniel Sutka, cover photo by Jan Mika
- Executive Producer Mary James
- Design by MFM Media
