= Antoine Guenet =

Belgian musician, composer, artist and educator

- Born: 1986 (age 39–40)
- Origin: Belgium
- Genres: Progressive rock, avant-jazz, experimental, art rock
- Occupations: Musician, composer, visual artist
- Instruments: Piano, keyboards, synthesizer, vocals
- Years active: 2009–present
- Website: antoineguenet.com

Antoine Guenet is a Belgian musician, composer, and visual artist. He is a pianist and keyboardist known for his work with The Wrong Object, Univers Zero, SH.TG.N, Machine Mass, and The Gödel Codex. In 2023, his artwork was exhibited at Lapin blanc, a contemporary art event on AI and art at La Conciergerie in Savoie, France. Guenet also co-founded L'École Autonome, the first Sudbury school in Wallonia, Belgium, in 2016.

== Career ==
=== Music ===
In 2009, Guenet founded the avant-rock band SH.TG.N, where he served as keyboardist and principal composer. Their self-titled debut was released by MoonJune Records in 2012. Guenet later joined The Wrong Object, playing keyboards on their album After the Exhibition (2013). In 2014, the band performed Frank Zappa's 200 Motels suite along with the Brussels Philharmonic, the Vlaams Radio Koor and Robert Martin, under the direction of Swedish conductor Alexander Hanson.

In 2013, he joined Univers Zéro under Daniel Denis, contributing to the album Phosphorescent Dreams (2014).

Guenet is a long-time collaborator with Michel Delville, joining him in the project Machine Mass along with American drummer Tony Bianco for the albums Machine Mass Plays Hendrix (2017) and Intrusion (2021), for which the trio became a sextet with musicians Laurent Blondiau, Manuel Hermia and Damien Campion.

He is also part of The Gödel Codex, an electro-jazz trio with Delville and drummer Étienne Plumer. Their album Oak was released in 2019 by Off Records.

Guenet appears in the documentary Romantic Warriors III: Canterbury Tales (2015), which explores the Canterbury scene and features The Wrong Object, including both performances and interviews with band members, including Guenet himself. The earlier film Romantic Warriors II: A Progressive Music Saga About Rock in Opposition (2012) includes extensive coverage of Univers Zéro, a band Guenet later joined in 2013, though he does not appear in the documentary.

=== Visual Art ===
Guenet’s artwork integrates AI tools and generative algorithms with other techniques. Releasing The River in 2022, made with generative AI Disco Diffusion, he was among the first to use the technology to make a full official music video. In 2023, he exhibited a series of AI-augmented music videos and multimedia pieces at the exhibition Lapin blanc at La Conciergerie, La Motte-Servolex.

=== Education ===
In 2016, Guenet co-founded L'École Autonome in Genval with composer Susan Clynes. The school operated on the Sudbury model: a democratic environment without formal classes, curriculum, or teachers, and was the first of its kind in French-speaking Belgium.

== Discography ==
With SH.TG.N

- SH.TG.N (2012, MoonJune Records)

With The Wrong Object

- After the Exhibition (2013, MoonJune Records)
- Zappa Jawaka (2018, Off Records)
- Into the Herd (2019, Off Records)

With Univers Zéro

- Phosphorescent Dreams (2014, Arcàngelo)

With Machine Mass

- Machine Mass Plays Hendrix (2017, MoonJune Records)
- Intrusion (2021, Off Records)

With The Gödel Codex

- Oak (2019, Off Records)

With Beautiful Badness

- A Sunny Morning (single, 2015)
- Many Years (EP, 2015)
- Rewind (2020, Jo&Co)
