= Insight (Maciek Pysz album) =

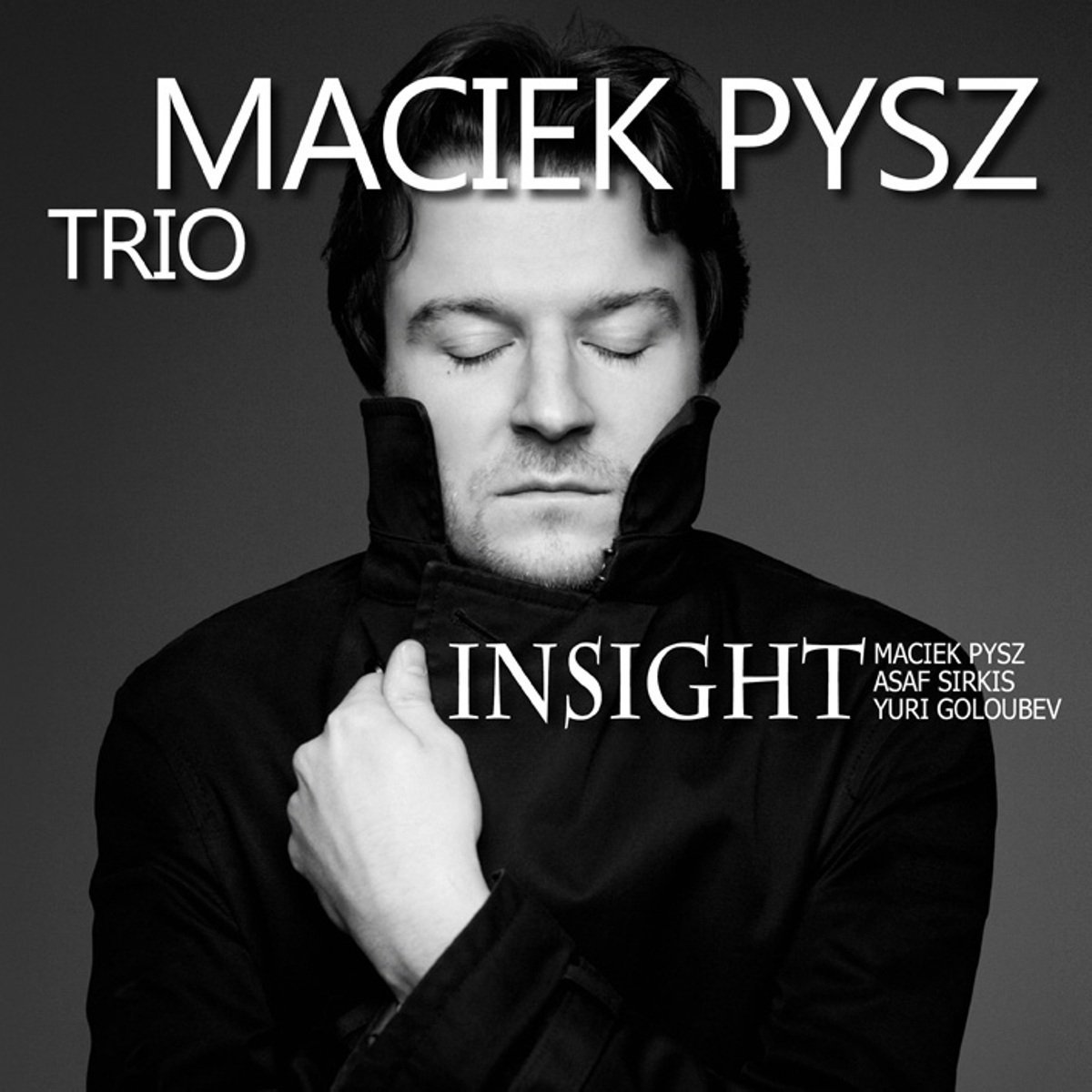

Studio album by Maciek Pysz
- Released: May 2013
- Recorded: 21–23 February 2013
- Studios: Artesuono Studios, Udine, Italy
- Genre: Jazz
- Label: 33 Jazz Records
- Producer: Stefano Armerio

Insight is an album by jazz musician Maciek Pysz, released in May 2013 on 33 Jazz Records. All tracks are composed by Pysz, except track 3, which is jointly composed and arranged by Gianluca Corona and Maciek Pysz.

== Reception ==
Insight received universally favourable reviews. The critic Stephen Graham proclaimed "an album that announces a major new presence on the jazz guitar scene". Peter Bacon in The Jazz Breakfast wrote "Maciek Pysz himself plays both acoustic and classical guitars, though so rich is the recording quality and so varied the sounds he manages to get that you’d swear sometimes there was electricity involved." In London Jazz News, Al Ryan wrote "There is an intuition or shorthand between the musicians that brings together some of the freshest musical ideas and worldwide musical influences to jazz. This CD is a culmination of three years of playing and touring together and the vibe and connection is obvious in the music." And Ian Mann wrote "Pysz's highly melodic writing and well delineated and unhurried playing style make for a highly satisfying and often beautiful album." Jack Massarik in Jazzwise described it as "melodic music played with sensitivity and conviction in a style that borrows more from folk and contemporary classical music than jazz..." Adam Baruch praised the sound quality of the album, stating there is "an astonishing sonic ambience" and awarded the album four stars out of five. In Jazzitalia, Gianni Montano described "catchy melodies...harmoniously developed" with simple music deceptive only in appearance, and where the search for particular nuances and tonal gradation are expressed in a coherent and consistent expansion. Other critics have mentioned that the deceptive simplicity of Insight is its greatest strength. Marcin Pulawski in Laboratorium Muzycznych Fuzji wrote of the painterly qualities of the music, of the shadows and light, warmth and colour, which give the listener a sense of truth and beauty. He gave the album eight out of ten stars.

== Track listing ==
All compositions by Maciek Pysz except track 3, "Amici", which is by Maciek Pysz and Gianluca Corona

1. Those Days – 6:38
2. Blue Water – 6:55
3. Amici – 7:27
4. Lost in London – 4:11
5. Insights – 4:47
6. Moody Leaf – 6:44
7. Maroon – 7:50
8. Steps of Time – 6:34
9. Under the Sky – 7:21

== Personnel ==
- Maciek Pysz - acoustic and classical guitars
- Yuri Goloubev - Bass
- Asaf Sirkis - Drums and percussion
- Produced and arranged by Maciek Pysz
- Recorded 21–23 February 2013 at Artesuono Studios, Udine, Italy
- Recorded, mixed and mastered by Stefano Amerio
- Photography by Krystian Data
- Design by Dirk Bertelmann
