= Aar Maanta =

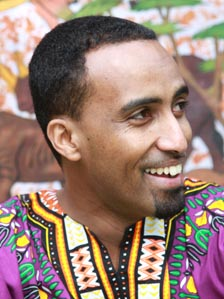

Background information
- Born: Jijiga, Ethiopia
- Genre: Somali music
- Occupations: singer; songwriter; actor; composer; instrumentalist; music producer
- Instruments: vocals; keyboard; oud
- Years active: 2004–present
- Label: Maanta Music
- Website: www.aarmaanta.com

Hassan-Nour Sayid (Somali: Xasan-Nuur Sayid, known by his stage name Aar Maanta) is a Somali–British singer-songwriter, actor, composer, instrumentalist and music producer.

== Personal life ==
Maanta, was born Hassan-Nour Sayid in Jigjiga, the capital of the Somali Region of Ethiopia. Maanta later moved to the United Kingdom at the end of the 1980s, on the eve of the civil war in Somalia.

As a lone child in a new country, Maanta turned to music for comfort, absorbing many genres including pop, rock, hip hop, R&B and house. He started studying music at school and then later at university. However, because of family pressure and disapproval due to his Muslim faith, Maanta was encouraged to follow a different career path. He consequently completed a degree in science, but eventually returned to singing.

== Career ==
Maanta produces an eclectic mix of styles blended with traditional Somali music, including the classical oud-centred Qaraami ("love songs" in Somali) style of the 1940s. According to him, traditional Somali music shares many similarities with that of North Africa, and Somali musical genres draw from a diverse range of influences, such as Arabic and Indian sounds. Maanta cites a growing appreciation with age for these roots of Somali music, as well as greater ease performing classical-based songs. His music has been described as 'afro-hop'.

In 2006, Maanta held his first notable performance at Rise: London United, the UK's largest multi-cultural festival. There, he played alongside Graham Coxon, The Buzzcocks, and other prominent acts. Over 80,000 young people and families attended this event, bringing together London residents from many different ethnic communities.

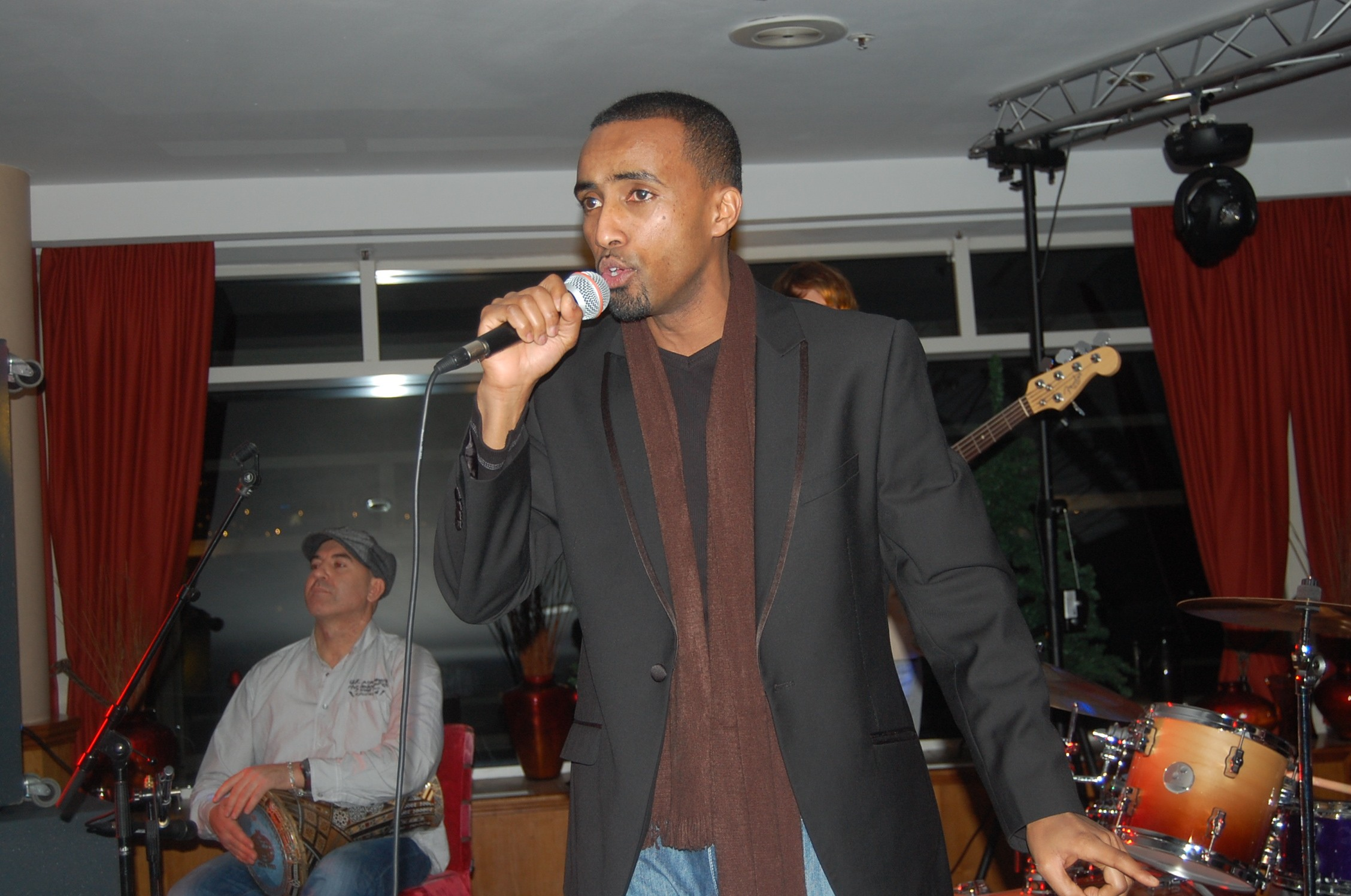
Aar Maanta performing with his band at Pier Scheveningen Strandweg in The Hague, Netherlands.

Maanta has since worked with various other artists including Algerian Raï singer Abdelkader Saadoun, UK hip hop group the Choong Family, and Somali musicians Maryam Mursal and Ahmed 'Hudeydi' Ismail Hussein.

Frustrated by what he regards as a lack of new Somali compositions, Maanta produced his own record of original songs in his home studio. In 2008, his debut album Hiddo & Dhaqan was released, featuring tracks such as "Asalamu Alaykum", "Saafi" and "Dhadhami".

Despite the significant increase of expatriate Somalis in recent years, there were no music bands that play live Somali music outside of Horn of Africa. Realising this need and the need to promote his album, Aar Maanta set up a multinational band that reflected the diversity of his musical influences and his base city of London. Aar Maanta is now the only Somali music artist in Europe that is successfully fusing traditional Somali music with a variety of contemporary influences. Recognizing this achievement in 2010, Star Africa Radio of Paris referred to Aar Maanta as a "a Somali culture shaper in London."

In September 2011, Maanta was forced to cancel a concert performance at the Cedar Cultural Centre in Minneapolis, after having already received approval for a visa following a long vetting process by U.S. immigration authorities. According to the festival's organizers, the U.S. embassy in London unreasonably delayed processing the artist's visa because of his Muslim background, provenance and real middle name, Mohammed. Maanta similarly indicated in a 2013 interview with The Independent that when traveling abroad, he was routinely stopped and asked unusual questions by UK security officials in suits. In protest, he staged a re-enactment of one such interrogation at Heathrow in the music video for his single "Deeqa".

In October 2013, Maanta embarked on the Track Change Tour, his first UK concert tour in support of his album Hiddo & Dhaqan. During the year's Eid celebrations, he also performed for the first time in Jijiga. Singing alongside other Somali artists, Maanta gave his new rendition of the traditional Dhaanto Somali genre.

In February 2014, Maanta released his second record, the six track EP Somali Songs from the Diaspora. His multinational supporting band provided session work on the album, with Maciek Pysz playing guitar on "Deeqa". The record was distributed through Aar's Maanta Music label.

In April 2015, Maanta performed at Cedar Cultural Center in Minneapolis as part of Midnimo's week-long residency. Over 700 people were in attendance and included Somali community members, Augsburg College students, and other music fans. Star Tribune's Chris Riemenschneider described Maanta's concert as a "textbook example of what makes the Cedar Cultural Center special".

Maanta is described by young Somalis in the UK as "the voice of our generation" because his songs discuss a range of issues of interest to Somali immigrants. His vocals have been touted as "almost Middle Eastern in feel," with a broad singing range and laidback delivery. A multi-instrumentalist, he plays the keyboard and oud, the latter of which is a staple of traditional Somali, Arabic and North African music.

== Awards ==
- 2012 Somali Music Awards – Best Music Video, Minneapolis.

== Discography ==
- Hiddo & Dhaqan (2008, Maanta Music)
- Somali Songs from the Diaspora (2014, Maanta Music)
