= Jon Lloyd (musician) =

British jazz saxophonist and composer

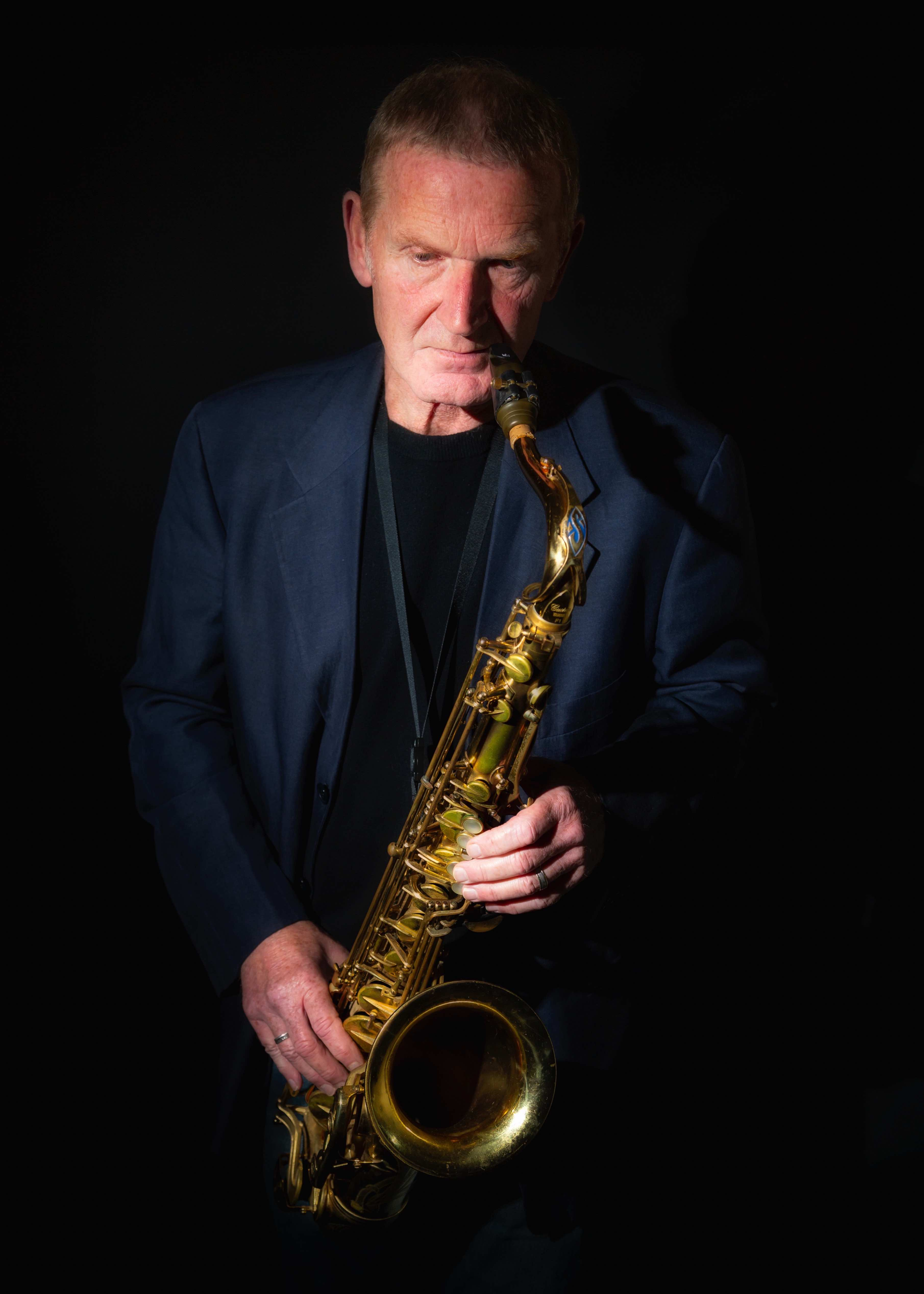

Background information
- Born: 20 October 1958 (age 67); Stratford-on-Avon, Warwickshire, England
- Genres: Jazz, contemporary classical, Free jazz, free improvisation
- Occupations: Musician, composer
- Instrument: Saxophone
- Years active: 1987–present
- Labels: FMR, HatHut, Leo, 33 Jazz, Ubuntu Music
- Website: jonlloydmusic.com

Jon Lloyd (born 20 October 1958) is a British jazz saxophonist and composer.

== Biography ==
He was born in Stratford-on-Avon, Warwickshire, England. He was educated at Warwick School and at Imperial College, London University, working for several years as a research scientist at London's King's College Hospital before pursuing a career divided between music and teaching.

From the mid-1980s onwards Jon Lloyd lived and worked in London and was part of the London free improvisation scene of the time. He played free jazz with the Lloyd Fowler Garside Trio, curated club events and organised many improvisation projects, including "Anacrusis", a large-scale improvising ensemble featuring saxophonist Evan Parker.

Through the 1990s his quartet with John Law, bassist Paul Rogers (or Tim Wells) and drummer Mark Sanders released CDs on LEO Records (Syzygy, 1991; Head!, 1993) and on the Swiss label HatART; (By Confusion, 1997).

High-profile performances by the quartet during this period included the 1993 Contemporary Music Network tour of the UK supporting the Bill Frisell Band, (QEH London concert broadcast on BBC R3) Berlin's FMP Festival in 1997 plus several Arts Council England tours.

In the late 1990s, Lloyd extended his compositional approach, writing more tightly composed music for a sextet of improvising musicians, releasing Praxis on FMR Records. This sextet included several names on the international free music scene of the time: violinist Aleksander Kolkowski, French trombonist Mark Boukouya, bassist John Edwards, American cellist Stan Adler and drummer Mark Sanders.

At the end of the 1990s several new projects arose, notably Jon Lloyd Four (released on HatOLOGY in 1999) with drummer Paul Clarvis, cellist Stan Adler and Brazilian bassist Marcio Mattos, and in 2001 the release on HatOLOGY of Abacus, John Law's suite for jazz quartet also comprising bassist Tim Wells and American drummer Gerry Hemingway. This album received the French "Choc" award of that year.

In the early part of the 2000s Lloyd explored contemporary classical composition. He wrote "String Quartet 1" (performed by Philipp Wachsmann, Stan Adler, Charlotte Glasson and Dylan Bates, Battersea Arts Centre, London) and "Form:Reform", a piece featuring flautist Rowland Sutherland (performed Russell-Cotes Museum, Bournemouth). Between 2001 and 2003, Lloyd was a shortlisted composer for the Society for the Promotion of New Music (SPNM) and had a piece broadcast on BBC Radio 3 ("Stasis"). The culmination of this period of composition was the recording Still Life (ASC Records) in 2003, a collection of reflective pieces written by Lloyd and performed by Lloyd on piano, Stan Adler on cello and Cathy Stevens, viola.

Returning to jazz-related performance in 2005, Lloyd worked again with John Law and in 2006 they released Mimesis (ASC Records), a suite of compositions (written by both musicians) for piano and soprano saxophone. This duo toured in the UK supported by Arts Council England.

In 2009, Lloyd began to embrace European jazz-related compositional elements in his writing and playing. The Jon Lloyd Quintet toured widely in the UK and the 2013 release, Vanishing Points (33Xtreme) with drummer Asaf Sirkis, bassist Tom Farmer, pianist John Law and guitarist Rob Palmer left free music behind and began to explore a much wider European sound.

2022 saw Lloyd involved with Renaissance. Conceived by composer and pianist John Law, this was a multi-media, ambient jazz work. Using samples of renaissance polyphonic choral work as a harmonic basis, Law composed extended pieces with an underlying electronic textural fabric (created in collaboration with Jasper Law) for saxophone and keyboard to improvise upon. The music was presented in major cathedrals around the UK, including Gloucester Cathedral, Durham Cathedral, Truro Cathedral, Beverley Minster and Christchurch Priory, accompanied by projected visuals by digital artist Patrick Dunn, touring VJ artist for Tangerine Dream. The first performance at Malmesbury Abbey was released as Live at Malmesbury Abbey (2022) on 33 Jazz Records.

The 2023 Jon Lloyd Quartet is a new group presenting Lloyd's European Contemporary Jazz compositions, performed by Jon (tenor and soprano saxophone), John Law (piano), Nick Pini (bass) and Alex Goodyear (drums) at UK/European venues and festivals. The Jon Lloyd Quartet recording Earth Songs was released by Ubuntu Music in February 2024.

=== Selected discography ===
- Syzygy (1990) (Jon Lloyd Quartet) LEO Records CDLR173
- Head! (1993) (Jon Lloyd Quartet) LEO records CDLR186
- By Confusion (1997) (Jon Lloyd Quartet) HatArt CD6198
- Praxis (1998) (Jon Lloyd Sextet) FMR Records CD 47-VO198
- Four and Five (1999) (Jon Lloyd Four) HatOLOGY CD537
- Abacus (2001) (John Law Quartet) HatOLOGY CD567
- Apparitions (2004) (Apparitions) LEO Records CDLR408
- Mimesis (2006) (Law/ Lloyd Duo) ASC Records CD85
- Still Life (2006) (Chamber Music) ASC Records CD87
- Vanishing Points (2013) (Jon Lloyd Quintet) 33xtreme002
- Brittle They Snap (2019) (Adler/ Lloyd Duo) Syzygy Records syzygy60
- Live at Malmesbury Abbey (2022) (Renaissance) 33JAZZ Records 33Jazz289
- Earth Songs (2024) (Jon Lloyd Quartet) Ubuntu Music UBU0162
