= The Wrong Object =

- Origin: Liège, Belgium
- Genres: Jazz, avant-garde jazz, jazz rock, progressive rock
- Years active: 2002–present
- Label: Moonjune
- Members: Michel Delville; Laurent Delchambre; Antoine Guenet; Marti Melia; Pierre Mottet
- Past members: Fred Delplancq; Damien Polard; Jean-Paul Estiévenart

The Wrong Object is a jazz-rock band from Belgium. The band was formed in 2002 by guitarist Michel Delville and includes Marti Melia on saxophone and clarinet, François Lourtie on saxophones, Antoine Guenet on keyboards, Pierre Mottet on bass and electronics, and Laurent Delchambre on drums. Former members include Fred Delplancq on tenor sax, Damien Polard on bass, and Jean-Paul Estiévenart (winner of the Django d'Or award for best young jazz musician in 2007) on trumpet.

== History ==
The Wrong Object started in 2002 as a Frank Zappa tribute band, and has played in venues such as Zappanale (2004, 2008 and 2024), the Gaume Jazz Festival, the Jazz à Liège Festival, and the European Jazz Festival in Athens. Some were augmented by guest performances by Elton Dean, Harry Beckett, Annie Whitehead, Jaap Blonk, and Zappa's percussionist Ed Mann.

"Elton Dean & The Wrong Object" and "The Wrong Object featuring Annie Whitehead and Harry Beckett", were documented by album releases from Voiceprint (Platform One) and Moonjune Records (The Unbelievable Truth, a collaboration with Elton Dean) in the spring of 2007. The Unbelievable Truth was included in Arnaldo de Souteiro's, Top Ten Jazz CDs of the Year 2007 (category: special projects) in the Brazilian newspaper Tribuna da Impresa.

The band is by Leonardo Pavkovic at Moonjune Records and Management in New York. In 2008, they released Stories from the Shed, their first studio album in more than five years. The album received positive reviews from Jazzwise, Guitar Player, Signal to Noise, Allmusic, Musica Jazz (July 2008), Jazz Review, and Exposé. Their music has also been broadcast by radio stations all around the world; in November 2007, the Dutch National Radio devoted a one-hour program to the band's discography and their collaborations with Elton Dean, Annie Whitehead, Harry Beckett and Alex Maguire VPRO.

== Discography ==
- The Unbelievable Truth featuring Elton Dean (Moonjune, 2006)
- Platform One featuring Harry Beckett and Annie Whitehead (Voiceprint, 2007)
- Stories from the Shed (Moonjune, 2008)
- The Wrong Object feat. Stanley Jason Zappa: Live at Zappanale (Fazzul, 2010)
- After the Exhibition (Moonjune, 2013)
- Zappa Jawaka (Off, 2018)
- Into the Herd (Off/MoonJune, 2019)
- In and Outflown Tapes (Off, 2024)

== Filmography ==
- 2015: Romantic Warriors III: Canterbury Tales (DVD)
