= Incite =

Incite may refer to:

- INCITE, formerly styled inCite, members' news magazine of the Australian Library and Information Association
- Incite (band), American metal band
- Incitement, a former offence under England and Wales law
- Incite Pictures, a documentary film production company
- Incite Productions, a documentary film production company

== See also ==
- Insight (disambiguation)
