= John Law (musician) =

British jazz pianist and composer

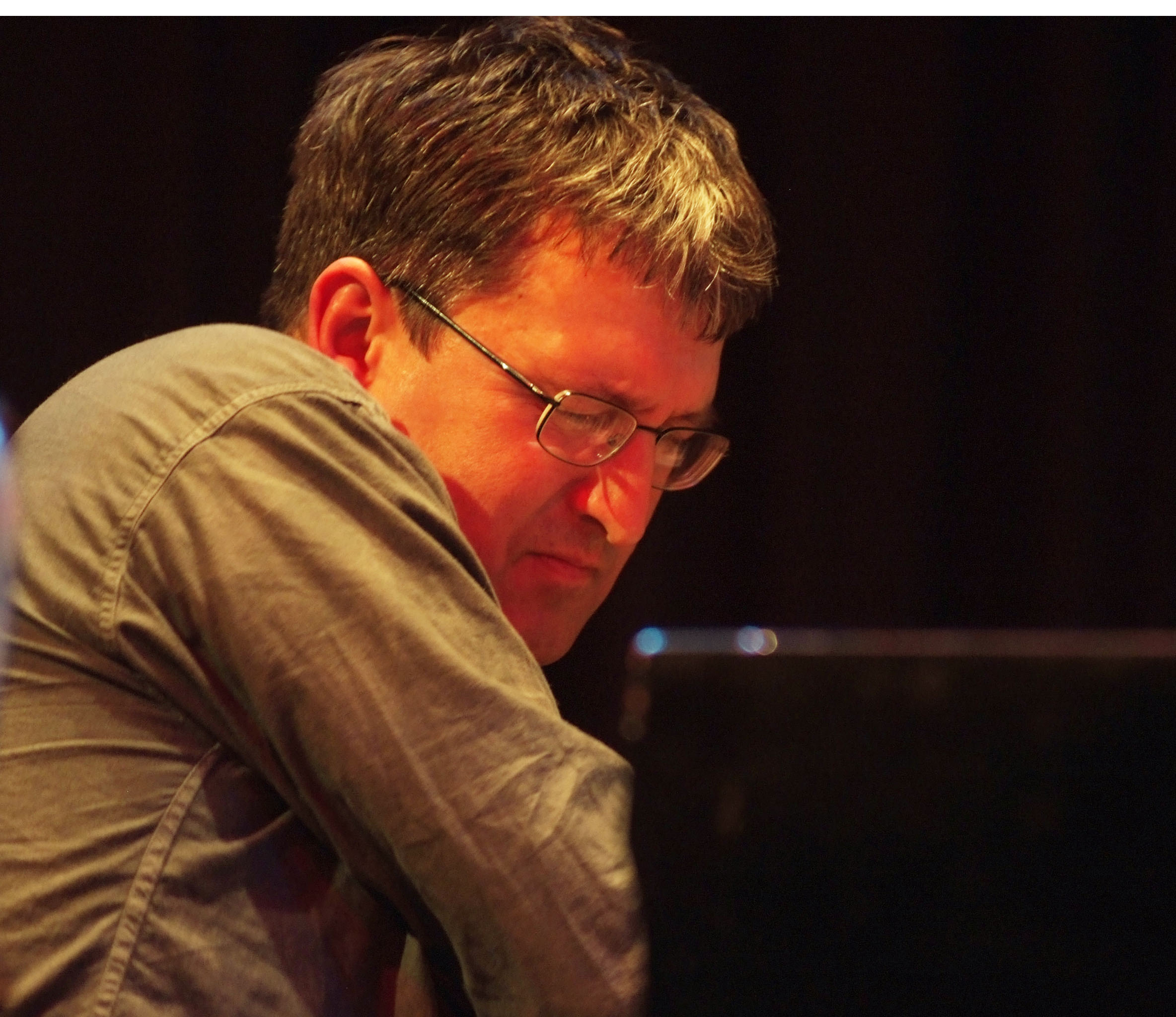

Background information
- Born: London, England
- Genres: Jazz, classical, free improvisation
- Occupations: Musician, composer
- Instrument: Piano
- Years active: 1988–present
- Labels: FMR, HatHut, Leo, 33 Jazz, Ubuntu Music

John Law is a British jazz pianist and composer, born in London to British and Austrian parents.

== Biography ==
He started classical piano at the age of four, playing in public at the age of six. With early encouragement from the Austrian concert pianist Alfred Brendel he was awarded a scholarship to study piano and composition at the Royal Academy of Music where he studied from 1979 to 1983, winning prizes for piano playing. After being awarded an Austrian government scholarship to study with the Viennese pianist Paul Badura-Skoda he studied for a year in Vienna at the Hochschule für Musik und darstellende Kunst, Wien. It was in Vienna that he first came across jazz and decided to pursue a career in this field, hoping to combine his love of the piano and performing with his interest in composition.

After some initial studies with Simon Purcell his early interest lay in freely improvised music. He performed with Evan Parker, Louis Moholo and Barry Guy, among others. In 1990 he began a long-term musical relationship with the saxophonist and composer Jon Lloyd, recording with Lloyd's quartet his first CD, Syzygy, for the Leo Records label. More recently Law appeared on Jon Lloyd's Vanishing Points (2013). Later John Law was to turn back to an exploration of his classical roots with a four-CD solo piano set entitled Chants, which was a series of compositions/improvisations based on early music and plainchant. Later still John turned towards a more recognisably contemporary jazz area, working with Tim Garland, Tim Wells, Dave Wickins, Steve Watts, Martin Speake, Paul Clarvis, Julian Siegel, Julian Nicholas and others, though his work has continued to include references to classical music, freely improvised music and the avant garde.

After 2005, Law was most widely known for his project The Art of Sound. The name of the trio, as well as the resulting series of four CDs, was taken from the name of the Italian studio where the recordings were all made: Artesuono in Udine, Italy. Playing almost exclusively Law's original, sometimes complex, sometimes extremely melodic, compositions, the trio, with Asaf Sirkis on drums and Sam Burgess on bass, recorded two highly successful albums: The Art of Sound, Volume 1 and Congregation, The Art of Sound Volume 4. Of The Art of Sound Vol 1, John Fordham in The Guardian wrote: "As well as being a formidable thematic improviser, whose phrasing constantly opens up new twists, Law writes beautiful romantic ballads" and awarded 4 stars. Volumes 2 and 3 were both solo piano recordings. Later, the Russian bass virtuoso Yuri Goloubev came into the trio and it changed to John Law's Congregation. Known for incorporating subtle effects into the piano and bass sound and for the addition to the drum kit of glockenspiel, hang and other sounds, the trio became known as much for the wide palette of sound colours, within a conventional jazz piano trio, as for the instrumental virtuosity of the individual players and the intricate, intense atmosphere of Law's compositions. In All About Jazz Jakob Baekgaard wrote: "Three Leaps of the Gazelle finds Law and his cohorts at the top of their game. It would be hard to find a more innovative and sympathetic trio working in jazz today." He awarded 5 stars. The same reviewer awarded 5 stars for John Law/Mark Pringle This Is. Jazzwise wrote: "[Law, a] pianist with an international reputation, unleashes an unstoppable flow of ideas with whatever band he puts together, constantly trying new things."

Law also performs solo piano concerts. During 2002/3 he performed in a two-piano project with the UK pianist Jason Rebello.

In 2001, Law's recording Abacus, featuring the American drummer Gerry Hemingway, was awarded a prize, a Choc, as one of the best CDs of the year, by the French jazz magazine Jazzman. In 2005 Law was awarded a distinction at classical piano diploma level, gaining dipABRSM.

Law has also composed for, toured and recorded a large suite for large ensemble, Out of the Darkness, with Andy Sheppard and members of the London Sinfonietta. At the Purcell Room in London, John Fordham described Out of the Darkness as "an ambitious piece combining rich and slowly transforming (sometimes rather Mike Gibbs-like) harmonic movements, sudden clustered ensemble sprints, and systems-music overlays of phrasing deploying bassoon, brass and strings lines against the jazz instruments... A rich and completely distinctive contemporary music programme."

John Law has also performed classical music projects, mainly the solo piano and visuals Goldberg, where he played J. S. Bach's Goldberg Variations (on the modern grand piano) with live accompanying visuals by graphic artist David Daniels, adapted live to the music by Patrick Dunn; also his two piano project Sacre, with fellow pianist David Gordon, where they played a selection of Stravinsky's Rite of Spring with original jazz re-interpretations of some of the key movements interpolated in-between the Stravinsky.

His current three main projects are his original quartet Congregation, featuring James Mainwaring on saxophones, guitar and effects, his quartet Re-Creations, which plays creative arrangements of well known tunes by other people, and Renaissance, an ambient duo with saxophonist Jon Lloyd, with John Law on midi keyboards and laptop, playing improvised music over looped pads derived from early sacred vocal music, put together by Jasper Law, with live visuals by Patrick Dunn.

Law has performed at over 50 festivals worldwide and made over 40 recordings. In 2020, he was awarded a prestigious Paul Hamlyn Foundation Award for Artists.

== Selected discography ==
- Syzygy – Jon Lloyd Quartet (Leo CDLR173, 1992)
- Exploded on Impact – John Law Quartet (SLAM CD204, 1993)
- Head – Jon Lloyd Quartet (Leo CDLR186, 1993)
- Talitha Cumi – John Law solo piano (FMR CD06, 1994)
- The Boat is Sinking, Apartheid is Sinking – John Law/Louis Moholo (Impetus CD19322, 1994)
- Pentecost – John Law solo piano (FMR CD027, 1996)
- The Onliest – John Law Trio (FMR CD38, 1996)
- Giant Leaves – John Law Trio (FMR CD32, 1996)
- By Confusion – Jon Lloyd Quartet (HatHut CD6198, 1997)
- Extremely Quartet – John Law/Paul Dunmall/Barry Guy/Louis Moholo (HatHut CD6199, 1997)
- The Hours – John Law solo piano (FMR CD40, 1997)
- Songs Without Words – John Law Trio (EOS CD12, 1998)
- Strange Stories – John Law Trio (Cornucopia CRCD03, 2000)
- Thanatos – John Law solo piano (Cornucopia CRCD04, 2000)
- Abacus – John Law Quartet, featuring Jon Lloyd, Gerry Hemingway (HatOLOGY5672001)
- Solitudes – John Law Trio solo piano (Cornucopia CRCD05, 2001)
- The Moment – John Law Trio/Quartet, featuring Tim Garland (Cornucopia CRCD06, 2001)
- Monk 'n' Junk – John Law Trio/Quartet, featuring Julian Siegel (ASC CD81, 2005)
- Out of the Darkness – Cornucopia Ensemble, featuring Andy Sheppard (SLAM CD264, 2004)
- Mimesis – Jon Lloyd/John Law Duo (ASC CD85, 2006)
- The Art of Sound Volume 1 – John Law/Sam Burgess/Asaf Sirkis (33JAZZ155, 2007)
- The Ghost in the Oak, The Art of Sound Volume 2 – John Law solo piano (33JAZZ176, 2008)
- Chorale, The Art of Sound Volume 3 – John Law solo piano (33JAZZ180, 2008)
- Congregation, The Art of Sound Volume 4 – John Law/Sam Burgess/Asaf Sirkis (33JAZZ193, 2009)
- This Is – John Law, Mark Pringle duo (33JAZZ219, 2011)
- Three Leaps of the Gazelle – John Law/Yuri Goloubev/Asaf Sirkis, (33JAZZ228, 2012)
- Vanishing Points – Jon Lloyd Group (33Xtreme002, 2013)
- Boink! – John Law group, featuring Jon Lloyd, Rob Palmer and Laurie Lowe (Cornucopia CRCD07, 2014)
- These Skies In Which We Rust – John Law's New Congregation, featuring Josh Arcoleo, Yuri Goloubev, Laurie Lowe (33Xtreme006, 2014)
- Goldberg – John Law solo piano (33Xtreme005, 2014)
- Re-Creations Volume 1 – John Law Quartet, featuring Sam Crockatt, James Agg, Billy Weir (33JAZZ267, 2017)
- Re-Creations Volume 2 – John Law solo piano (33JAZZ278, 2019)
- Re-Creations Volume 3 – John Law Quartet, featuring Sam Crockatt, James Agg, Billy Weir (33JAZZ279, 2019)
- CONFIGURATION – John Law's Congregation, featuring James Mainwaring, Ashley John Long, Billy Weir (Ubuntu UBU0036, 2020)
- Renaissance - Live at Malmesbury Abbey John Law/Jon Lloyd/Jasper Law (33JAZZ289, 2022)
- Many Moons – John Law's Re-Creations, featuring Sam Crockatt, Henrik Jensen, Alex Goodyear (33JAZZ296, 2024)
- Earth Songs – Jon Lloyd Quartet (Ubuntu UBU0162, 2024)
