= Tony Bianco =

American jazz drummer and composer (1953–2025)

- Born: Anthony Bianco; May 24, 1953; New York City, U.S.
- Died: September 14, 2025 (aged 72) Shropshire, England
- Genres: Jazz
- Occupation: Musician
- Instrument: Drums
- Labels: 33 Jazz, Moonjune
- Website: www.tonybianco.f9.co.uk

Anthony Bianco (May 24, 1953 – September 14, 2025) was an American jazz drummer and composer from New York City who moved to Europe in the early 1990s. He has been described as a "true master of the drums ". He played and recorded with many prominent jazz musicians including Elton Dean, Alexander von Schlippenbach, Dave Liebman, Paul Dunmall, and Evan Parker. In 2008 he brought Liebman and Parker together for a BBC recording which resulted in the album Relevance.

Bianco recorded a contemporary jazz album, In a Western Sense, featuring Zoe Rahman. He played with Elton Dean on his concept called "Freebeat", which resulted in two albums featuring Dean on Northern Lights and Liebman on Monkey Dance.

In 2009 he recorded Never Pet a Burning Dog with the band douBt with guitarist Michel Delville and pianist Alex Maguire. The album received four stars from Down Beat magazine. In the annual poll by Arnaldo DeSouteiro, Bianco was one of the top five drummers and douBt was the third best instrumental group.

In 2011, Bianco and Delville created the electro-jazz project Machine Mass, which was joined by Dave Liebman in 2012. Bianco was known for his "mercurial", "octopusian" drumming style, which combined the sounds of free jazz and straight jazz and reflected Bianco's musical creed – to be "loose and tense, free and strict".

Bianco died in Shropshire, England, on September 14, 2025, at the age of 72.

== Selected discography ==
- Sea of Infinity by Elton Dean (Hux, 1997)
- " Utoma Trio" (Emanem 2000)
- Hour Glass (Emanem, 2001)
- In a Western Sense (33 Jazz, 2003)
- "Remembrance" (NoBusinessRecords 2004)
- "Vesuvius" (SLAM 2004)
- "Lineish" (Emanem 2004)
- "Decision Dream Steamroom Variations" (Red toucan Records 2005)
- "freebeat" (FMR Records 2005)
- "Avyahyah" (FMR Records 2005)
- Monkey Dance (FMR, 2006)
- Never Pet a Burning Dog by douBt (Moonjune, 2009)
- Spirits Past and Future (Duns-limited, 2009)
- "Invoking Spirits" (mark alan murray records 2009)
- Relevance (Red Toucan, 2009)
- As Real as Thinking by Machine Mass Trio (Moonjune 2011)
- "Dig Deep Trio" (FMR Records 2011)
- "Tribute to Coltrane" (SLAM 2012)
- "Homage to John Coltrane" (SLAM 2013)
- "Inti" (MoonJune Records 2014)
- "extremes" (Red Toucan Records 2014)
- "Tony Bianco's Utoma Quartet" (FMR Records 2014)
- "Autumn" (FMR Records 2015)
- "Machine Mass Plays Hendrix" (MoonJune Records 2017)
- "Rising Up" (Discus Music 2021)
- "Wayward Mystic-Improvisations inspired by the music of St.Hildegard von Bingen (Discus Music 2022)
- "Prema" (FMR Records 2023)
- " Sentient Beings" (OFF 2023)
- "Truth is not the enemy" by Sentient Beings, live at the Vortex (Discus 2024)
