= 48 Cameras =

48 Cameras, often referred simply as 48C, is a musical and international collective in a format that varies according to circumstances. It was created in 1984 by both musicians and non-musicians (the line-up varies greatly), some currently living in Belgium, Netherlands, United Kingdom, etc. To this day, 48 Cameras recorded 13 albums, the work being done frequently via the Internet (some of the members have never met), allowing the collective to welcome various guests from diverse cultures and a wide range of disciplines : Annemarie Borg (Antara Project), Rodolphe Burger, Andy Cairns (Therapy?), David Coulter, Michel Delville, Sandy Dillon, Michael Gira, Marcel Kanche, Tom Heasley, Gerard Malanga, Martyn Bates, (Eyeless in Gaza), DJ Olive, Charlemagne Palestine, Philippe Poirier, Nicholas Royle, Eugène Savitzkaya, Robin Rimbaud (Scanner), Malka Spiegel, Vesica Piscis, Aaron Ximm, etc. The music created has been described as being alternative, ambient, art rock, dark, folk, industrial or even psychedelic. Rightly or wrongly, the collective has been compared to bands as Coil, Psychic TV or Current 93.

Paul Buck, the author of the novel "The Honeymoon Killers", was once a member of the collective.

Due to the characteristics of the collective, 48 Cameras has only performed on stage eight times in its 33 years of existence : in Amay, Paris, Nancy, Brussels and Liège. In March 2004, the RTBF’s "Les 100 minutes de Tyan" gave its last second two hours long programme to the collective.

Jean M. Mathoul, one of the members of the collective, once said, paraphrasing David Herbert Lawrence: "Our music could be a music written in a foreign language which we would not totally like to master".

The name of the collective refers to Muybridge and to a Jim Morrison poem : "Muybridge derived his animal subjects from the Philadelphia Zoological Garden, male performers from the University. The women were professional artists' models, also actresses and dancers, parading nude before the 48 cameras" (in "The Lords and the new creatures").

== Discography ==
- "B-Sides are for lovers" (vinyl / 1985 / 139 K's Records). Reissued in 2009 by Infrastition (France) under the shape of a digipack including two bonus tracks
- "Third & last imitation of Christ" ( CD / 1992 / Besides)
- "Easter, November & a year" (CD / 1994 / Les Disques du Soleil et de l'Acier)
- "Me, my youth & a bass drum" (CD / 1996 / Big Bang)
- "From dawn to dust & backwards" (CD / 1997 / Besides)
- "THREE weeks WITH my DOG" with Gerard Malanga as guest (CD / 1999 / Besides)
- "I swear I saw garlic growing under my father's steps" (CD / 2002 / Interzone)
- "Three weeks long, I saw garlic growing under my dog's steps" (2005_2006 / Dead Scarlet Records) reissued under the shape of a double digipack of the previous two albums
- "After all, isn't tango the dance of the drunk man?" (Digipack / 2006 / Interzone + Carbon7)
- "Before me lay some more dark waters" (Digipack / 2009 / Interzone + an eastern Belgium at night production). To note in this respect that the first 23 copies of this album were voluntarily "abandoned" in places public : parks, libraries, brasseries, etc. in New York, Paris, Berlin, Brussels, London, etc.
- "Right north, she said..." (Double-digipack / 2012 / Interzone + Transonic)
- "From a river to a hill" (limited edition / 2012 / Siren Wire Editions)
- "We could bring you silk" in May with Scanner as guest (Digipack / 2013 / Interzone)
- "Run Amok Run" (limited edition / 2014 / Siren Wire Editions)
- "Songs our mothers taught us" / Digipack : 2016 / Interzone)

The collective has participated in 1999 to Gerard Malanga's album Up From the Archives, issued on the label Sub Rosa and including interventions of William Burroughs, Jack Kerouac, Angus MacLise, Thurston Moore, DJ Olive, Iggy Pop, and Andy Warhol, among others.

== Current members ==
- Antara Annemarie Borg (UK) : keyboards, spoken words, vocals
- Calogero Marotta (Italy / UK) : acoustic bass guitar, bass, double-bass, cello, guitar, keyboards
- Jean Marie Mathoul aka Jean M. Mathoul (Belgium) : devices, drones, loops, lyrics, mix, percussions, soundscapes, treatments
- Bert Vanden Berghe (Netherlands) : guitars, treatments

48 Cameras just started the recording of Songs from the Marriage of Heaven & Hell according to William Blake with Edward Ka-Spel (The Legendary Pink Dots) on spoken words.

== Side projects ==
Every member of 48 Cameras has led one or several parallel musical activities. In 2002, David Coulter (UK) and Jean M. Mathoul (Belgium) recorded with Charlemagne Palestine (US) by correspondence the album, Maximin, released on Michael Gira 's label, Young God Records. In the same way, in 2004 David Coulter, Jean M. Mathoul and Charlemagne Palestine also recorded with Michael Gira (US), and once again by correspondence, Gantse Mishpuchah - Music in 3 Parts, released on the Italian label Fringes Recording.
