= Good Days At Schloss Elmau =

Studio album by Gwilym Simcock
- Released: 2011
- Genre: Jazz
- Length: 58:27
- Label: ACT Music, Vision GmbH

Gwilym Simcock chronology
Blues Vignette (2010)	Good Days At Schloss Elmau (2011)

Good Days At Schloss Elmau is a 2011 album by British jazz and classical pianist and composer Gwilym Simcock. Schloss Elmau is a luxury hotel in Bavaria. Mojo placed the album at number 43 on its list of the "Top 50 Albums Of 2011".

It was one of the twelve nominees for the Mercury Music Prize, ultimately losing to PJ Harvey's Let England Shake.

== Track listing ==
1. These Are the Good Days 6:12
2. Mezzotint 6:40
3. Gripper 6:38
4. Plain Song 5:51
5. Northern Smiles 5:48
6. Can We Still Be Friends? 12:19
7. Wake Up Call 5:31
8. Elmau Tage 9:28
