= TriPod =

Rock trio

- TriPod in Mexico

Background information
- Origin: New York City
- Genres: Rock, progressive rock
- Years active: 1998–present
- Labels: Moonjune
- Members: Clint Bahr; Keith Gurland; Steve Romano
- Website: www.tripod-theband.com

TriPod is a rock trio with no guitars or keyboards.

TriPod uses non-traditional instruments in the melodic line (bass, brass, theremin, and woodwinds). The band has been classified as jazz fusion, Canterbury, world music, progressive rock, alternative rock, Rock in Opposition, and avant-garde, but TriPod considers itself a rock band.

TriPod performs only original music and includes improvisation in stage performances and on albums. The band was discovered at CBGBs in New York City by Genya Ravan and tours internationally, performing in venues from clubs to international festivals: 2005 - Baja Prog Festival (Mexico); 2006 - Zappanale Festival (Germany), North West Rock Festival (Croatia), Burg Herzberg Festival (Germany); 2007 - European tour (Germany, Croatia, Serbia, Hungary, Slovenia, Bosnia, Netherlands, Belgium).

It is composed of three New York musicians: Clint Bahr (12-string bass guitar, Chapman Stick, Taurus pedals, Theremin, vocals), Keith Gurland (alto and tenor sax, flute, clarinet, panpipes, pedals, vocals) and Steve Romano (acoustic and electric drums and percussion).

Following in the tradition of King Crimson and Emerson, Lake & Palmer, TriPod creates symphonic rock music. At one point Pierre Moerlen from Gong was a band member.

TriPod's album was released by Moonjune Records, known for promoting artists such as Soft Machine and Elton Dean.
