= Yuri Goloubev =

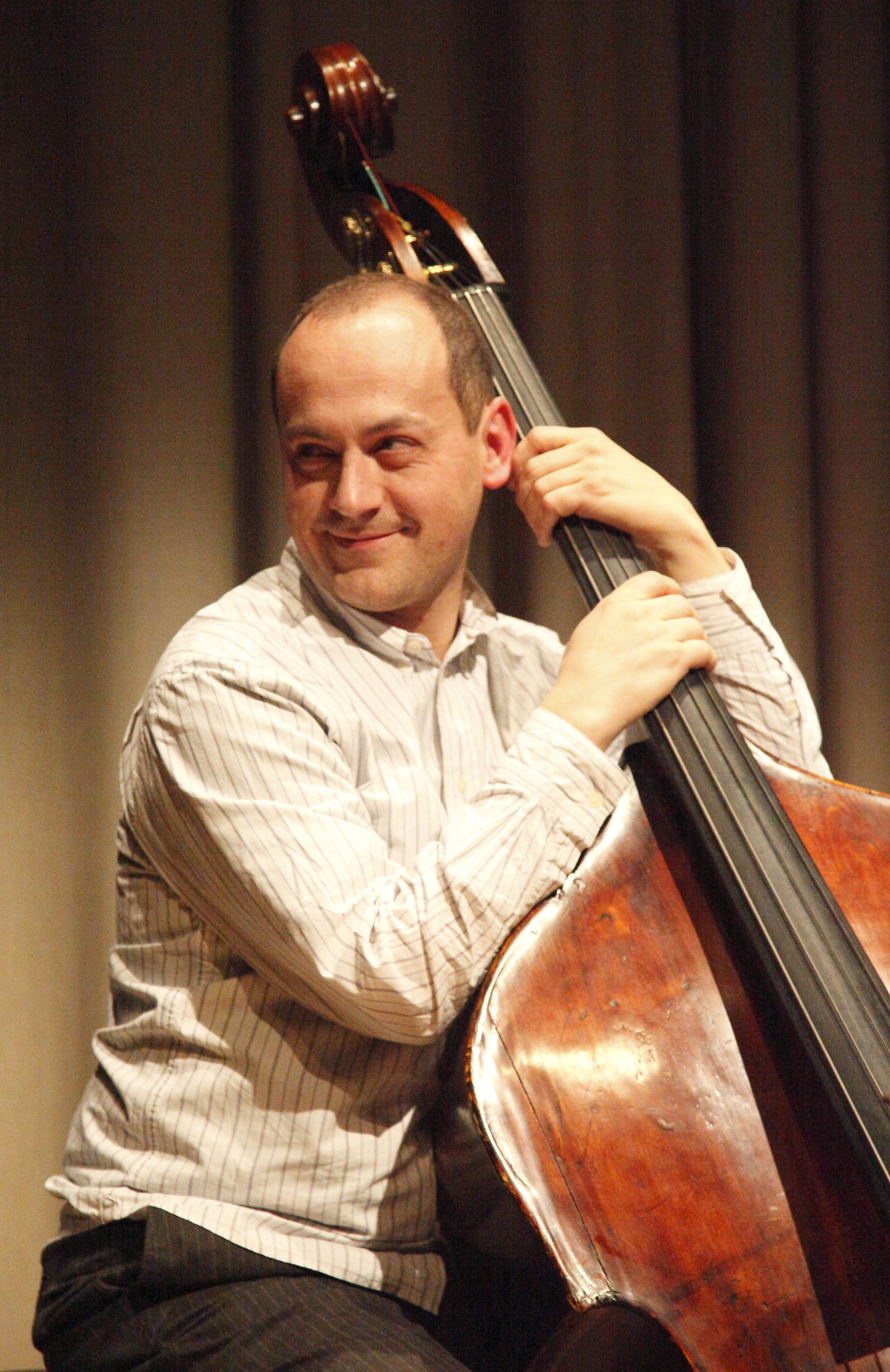
- Yuri Goloubev, photographed by David Forman

Background information
- Born: 27 July 1972 (age 54); Moscow, Russia
- Genre: Jazz
- Occupations: Musician, composer
- Instrument: Double bass
- Years active: 1991–present
- Labels: ACT, Universal, Basho
- Website: yurigoloubev.com

Yuri Goloubev (Russian: Юрий Голубев; born 27 July 1972) is a jazz musician, composer and double bass player. He switched to jazz in 2004 after over a dozen years as a bass player in classical orchestras, and has achieved success in jazz also as a performer with "perfect pitch, flawless execution and an improviser's imagination". He is also praised for his arco playing. Ian Patterson, writing in All About Jazz wrote "There are few better exponents of arco, and his tone has the warm resonance of a cello."

== Classical career ==
Yuri Goloubev won the First Prize in the All-Soviet-Union Students' Competition in 1990, then started work as the Principal Bass with the Moscow-based "Ensemble XXI" Chamber Orchestra (1990–1991). From 1991 until 1992 he also worked as a section bass with the Bolshoi Theatre. He studied classical composition at the Moscow Tchaikovsky Conservatory and 1995 he received his master's degree in double bass as a soloist and chamber music performer. From 1992 til 2004 he was the Principal Bass with the Moscow Soloists directed by Yuri Bashmet. It was during this time that he performed with many artists such as Mario Brunello, Sarah Chang, James Galway, Lynn Harrell, Barbara Hendricks, Kim Kashkashian, Gidon Kremer, Shlomo Mintz, Thomas Quasthoff, Sviatoslav Richter, Mstislav Rostropovich, Vladimir Spivakov, Uto Ughi and Maxim Vengerov. He has performed at venues such as Sydney Opera House, Royal Albert Hall, Musikverein, Carnegie Hall, Suntory Hall, Gewandhaus, Concertgebouw, Salle Pleyel, Palacio de Bellas Artes, Palais des Beaux Arts, Accademia di Santa Cecilia and Megaro. He has also appeared at major festivals such as the Kuhmo Chamber Music Festival (Finland), Hong Kong Festival of the Arts, Bath Music Festival (UK), Perth Festival (Australia), Casals Festival (Puerto Rico), Prestige de la Musique (France) and Omaggio a Roma (Italy).

== Jazz career ==
In December 2004 Goloubev moved to Milan, dedicated himself solely to jazz and quickly gained the attention of many Italian musicians. He worked with such artists as Francesco Bearzatti, Fabrizio Bosso, Antonio Faraò, Giovanni Falzone, Claudio Fasoli, Paolo Fresu, Rosario Giuliani, Guido Manusardi, Massimo Manzi, Enrico Pieranunzi and Glauco Venier. He also worked with Bob James, Pablo Held, Till Brönner, Asaf Sirkis, Harvey Mason, Franco Ambrosetti, Kenny Werner, Klaus Gesing, John Law, Benjamin Henocq, Stan Sulzmann, Wolfgang Muthspiel, Julian Argüelles, Tim Garland, Rick Margitza, Manhu Roche, Gwilym Simcock, Chico Freeman, Jason Rebello, Daniele Di Bonaventura, Chihiro Yamanaka, Bill Smith and Billy Kilson. In 2007–2009 he taught at the jazz faculty of CPM Music Institute in Milan and in 2010 became the Jazz Double Bass Professor at The Conservatorio di Musica F.A. Bonporti, Trento. Currently (since 2015), he teaches at the Royal Welsh College of Music & Drama in Cardiff, Wales, as well as at the Siena Jazz University - Accademia Nazionale del Jazz, Siena.

Goloubev is also a composer and has released several albums as leader. His album Two Chevrons Apart received a 4-star review in DownBeat.

He has performed on over 100 recordings and two of his trio albums have been selected as Critics Choice Top 10 Jazz Albums in Japan: Roberto Olzer Trio - Steppin' Out, #1 Best Jazz Album, 2013, Michele di Toro Trio - Play, #8 Best Jazz Album, 2014. Various albums with his participation have been featured in the inflight entertainment programs of such airlines as Air France, Lufthansa, British Airways, Swiss, Emirates. He has received widespread acclaim for his partnership with the pianist Gwilym Simcock in two recordings released on ACT Music in 2014. Their album "Duo Art: Reverie at Schloss Elmau" received a number of 4 star reviews. The critic Dave Gelly wrote in The Observer "In Russian bassist Yuri Goloubev, Gwilym Simcock has obviously found a collaborator with the same expansive imagination and equal virtuosity. The interplay between the two is like musical telepathy." In JazzTimes H. Allen Williams wrote, "Goloubev's playing is a sound of beauty with impeccable technique and heartfelt feel."

== Awards ==
- Awarded the title Honored Artist of Russia by President Putin in 2002

== Discography ==
=== As leader / co-leader ===
- Non-Standard Approach - Yuri Goloubev (feat. Simone Locarni, Hans Mathisen, Andrew Bain) (Abeat Records, 2026)
- Trionomics - Michele Di Toro/Yuri Goloubev/Hans Mathisen (Caligola, 2023)
- Two Chevrons Apart - Yuri Goloubev (Basho, 2020)
- Duonomics - Michele Di Toro/Yuri Goloubev (Caligola 2018)
- Reverie at Schloss Elmau — Gwilym Simcock/Yuri Goloubev (ACT Music, 2014)
- Creating Magic — various artists (ACT Music, 2014)
- Standpoint — Just Music Trio (Caligola, 2012)
- Titanic for a Bike — Yuri Goloubev (feat. Julian Arguelles, Claudio Filippini, Asaf Sirkis) (Caligola, 2011)
- Metafore Semplici — Yuri Goloubev (feat. Klaus Gesing, Giovanni Falzone, Gwilym Simcock, Asaf Sirkis) (Universal, 2009)
- SGS Group, Inc, Presents — Gwilym Simcock, Yuri Goloubev, Asaf Sirkis (Music Center, 2008)
- Mulini a Vento — Bottos/Goloubev/Colussi (Jazzengine, 2008)
- Hommage à Duke — Glauco Venier, Yuri Goloubev, Asaf Sirkis (Caligola, 2007)
- Private Tales — Mario Zara, Yuri Goloubev, Marco Zanoli (Abeat, 2007)
- Intermezzo — Glauco Venier (Artesuono, 2004–2007)
- Tandem — Guido Manusardi, Yuri Goloubev ( Splasc(h), 2006)
- The Bridge — Yuri Goloubev/Andrey Kondakov (Landy Star, 2003)
- Toremar Island — (Landy Star, 2001)
- Rendering — Igor Bril/Yuri Goloubev (Cantabile, 1996)

=== As sideman (partial list) ===
- Pont De Vie - Maciek Pysz (with Daniele Di Bonaventura) (Abeat Records, 2026)
- Invisible Cities - Luigi Martinale Quartet & Cuneo Conservatoire Chamber Orchestra (Abeat Records, 2025)
- Stay Human - Michele Perruggini (Abeat Records, 2025)
- Vienna Chamber Diaries - Johannes Berauer with Klaus Gesing, Wolfgang Muthspiel, Gwilym Simcock and others (Basho Records, 2022)
- Notturno - Roberto Olzer Trio with Strings (Atelier Sawano, 2021)
- On Vacation - Till Bronner / Bob James (Sony Music, 2020)
- Re:Focus - Tim Garland (Edition Records, 2020)
- Weather Walker - Tim Garland (Edition Records, 2018)
- Celeste - Roberto Olzer Trio (Atelier Sawano, 2018)
- The Moon and The Bonfires - Roberto Olzer Trio (Atelier Sawano, 2015)
- A Journey - Maciek Pysz, Daniele de Bonaventura, Yuri Goloubev & Asaf Sirkis (Dot Time Records, 2015)
- Magna Carta Suite - Alex Hutton, Liz Palmer, Liesbeth Allart, Neil Sparkes, Yuri Goloubev, Asaf Sirkis (F-Ire, 2015)
- Spring Thing Marco Cortesi, Gianluca Di lenno, Yuri Goloubev, Asaf Sirkis (PBR Records, 2015)
- Fade Out Mario Zara, Yuri Goloubev, Michele Salgarello (Abeat, 2015)
- Elisa Nel Paese delle Meraviglie -Elisa Marangon, Mauro Negri, Roberto Olzer, Yuri Goloubev (TRJ records, 2015)
- Glitterwoods -Fabienne Ambuehl, Yuri Goloubev, Asaf Sirkis (Traumton, 2015)
- Dafne - The Rest of Me - Dafne Franzoni, Paolo Filippi, Diego Zanoli, Antonio Leofreddi, Paolo Legramandi, Cisco Portone, Sergi Pescara, Massimo Moriconi, Yuri Goloubev (OMP Records, 2015)
- Still Chime - Marcella Carboni, Francesca Corrias, Max De Aloe, Yuri Goloubev, Francesco S'Auria (Abeat, 2014)
- These Skies In Which We Rust -John Law, Josh Arcoleo, Yuri Goloubev, Laurie Lowe, Holly Law (33Xtreme, 2014)
- Yumi Ito Quartet - Yumi Ito, Gabriel Dalvit, Yves Theiler, Yuri Goloubev (private production, 2014)
- Play — Michele di Toro, Yuri Goloubev, Marco Zanoli (Abeat, 2014)
- PrimaVera — Silvia Infascelli, feat. Silvia Infascelli, Frank Harrison, Yuri Goloubev (and arrangements), Asaf Sirkis (Caligola, 2014)
- Final Step — Matteo Finali feat. Matteo Finali, Max Pizio, Alessandro Ponti, Yuri Goloubev, Dario Milan, Silvano De Tomaso (Altrisuoni, 2014)
- Instrumation — Gwilym Simcock (ACT Music, 2014)
- Creating Magic — various artists (ACT Music, 2014)
- Perfect Equipoise — Davide Recchia (TRJ records, 2013)
- Insight — Maciek Pysz Trio (33 Jazz Records, 2013)
- Nadir – Daniele Di Bonaventura (Tuk Music, 2013)
- What's New Over the Rainbow – Lalo Conversano & Danilo Moccia "Brass Joy" (Brass Joy, 2012)
- Otto – Francesco Grillo (Universal, 2012)
- Steppin' Out – Roberto Olzer Trio (Abeat, 2012)
- Three Leaps of the Gazelle – John Law, (33 Jazz Records, 2012)
- While We're Young – Gianna Montecalvo (Dodicilune, 2012)
- Some Tales – Dafne (RNC Music, 2012)
- Legentis – Alex Hutton (F-IRE, 2011)
- Balkan Bop – Markelian Kapidani (Red Records, 2011)
- Say It With Style – Gwilym Simcock (Scoring House, 2011)
- Throw Me The Groove – Gwilym Simcock (Scoring House, 2011)
- Res Nova – Mattia Cigalini (My Favorite Records, 2011)
- Notturni – Carlo Magni (Music Center, 2011)
- You and the Night and the Music – Guido Manusardi (Music Center, 2011)
- Bossa & Friends – Alvaro Belloni (Music Center, 2010)
- Reflections – Claudio Fasoli Emerald Quartet (Blue Serge, 2010)
- Exit For Three – Dario Carnovale (Albore Jazz, 2010)
- Natura Morta con Flauto – Beppe Aliprandi Quartet (Ultrasound, 2010)
- Some Portraits – Carlo Morena Trio (Music Center, 2010)
- Brass Joy – Lalo Conversano/Danilo Moccia (Music Center, 2010)
- La Strada della Luna – Marco Fusi (2009)
- Blues Vignette – Gwilym Simcock ( Basho, 2009)
- Conduction 3 – Carlo Alberto Canevali (nBn, 2009)
- Stan-darts – ENS Live (TCB, 2009)
- The Night of the Storytellers – Enzo Favata (Isola dei Suoni, 2009)
- Venice Inside – Claudio Fasoli Emerald Quartet (Blue Serge, 2009)
- From The Sky – Michele Di Toro (Music Center, 2009)
- The Sand – Guido Manusardi (MAP, 2009)
- Decantando – Federica Santi (Caligola, 2008)
- FPQ – Francesco Pinetti (Music Center, 2008)
- Glauco Venier suona Frank Zappa – Feat. Klaus Gesing (Music Center, 2008)
- Pollocksuite – Ferdinando Faraò (Music Center, 2007)
- A French Man in New York – Kekko Fornarelli (WideSound, 2007)
- Il Gioco Delle Forme – Massimo Colombo (Splasc(h), 2007)
- Promenade – Claudio Fasoli Emerald Quartet (Comar23, 2007)
- Way Out – Europe Connection (Dodicilune, 2007)
- Il Passo Del Gatto – Michele Di Toro Trio (Abeat, 2006)
- No More No Less – Guido Manusardi (SoundHills, 2006)
- Unquiet Serenade – Nicita/Di Rosa (Abeat, 2006)
- Heartluggage – Klaus Gesing (ATS, 2006)
- Леденец для дурочки – Aleksandr Laerstky (laertsky.com, 2004)
- Colours – Lorenzo Erra (Ultrasound, 2004)
- Голоса родных – Alexander Laerstky (Elias, 2000)
- Sergei Prokofiev – Quintet – Russian String Quartet (Arte Nova, 2000)
- New Romantic Jazz – Vyacheslav Gorsky (I.F. & M., 1999)
- Brahms/Shostakovich – Moscow Soloists (Sony Classical, 1998)
- Haydn – Cello Concertos – Moscow Soloists (Auvidis, 1998)
- An Introduction to Faradj Karajev – Studio for New Music Ensemble (Megadisc, 1996)
- Canti – Partick De Clerck (Megadisc, 1996)
- An Introduction to Alexander Wustin – Studio for New Music Ensemble (Megadisc, 1996)
- Schnittke/Berg – feat. Gidon Kremer (violin), Yuri Bashmet (viola), Mstislav Rostropovich (cello), Moscow Soloists (EMI Classics, 1996)
- Taneev/Glinka – Moscow Conservatory Quintet (Chant Du Monde, 1995)
- Tchaikovsky/Bartok – Ensemble XXI (Ensemblegram, 1992)
- Mozart/Dvoràk – Ensemble XXI (Ensemblegram, 1991)
