= Michel Delville =

Belgian musician, writer and critic

- Born: 1969 (age 56–57); Liège, Belgium
- Genres: Jazz fusion, progressive rock
- Occupations: Musician, teacher, writer, songwriter
- Instruments: Guitar, electronics
- Labels: Moonjune, Voiceprint, Fazzul
- Website: micheldelville.com

Michel Delville (born 1969) is a Belgian musician, writer and critic. Delville teaches literature at the University of Liège. He is the author of books about comparative poetics and interdisciplinary studies. He was awarded the 1998 SAMLA Book Award, the Choice Outstanding Book Award, the Léon Guérin Prize, the 2001 Alumni Award of the Belgian American Educational Foundation, the rank of Officer of the Order of Leopold I (2009), and the 2009 Prix Wernaers pour la recherche et la diffusion des connaissances.

Delville has been performing and composing alternative music since the mid-1980s. His bands include The Wrong Object, douBt, Machine Mass feat. Dave Liebman, Alex Maguire's Electric 6tet, the New Texture Pan Tonal Fellowship (under the direction of Stanley Jason Zappa), the Ed Mann Project, and the Moving Tones. He has worked with Dave Liebman, Elton Dean, Annie Whitehead, Harry Beckett, Richard Sinclair, Ed Mann, Alex Maguire, Dagmar Krause, Benoît Moerlen, Tony Bianco, Karen Mantler, Geoff Leigh, Markus Stauss, Guy Segers, Klaus Blasquiz, Gilad Atzmon, and Dirk Wachtelear.

In 2009 he created the trio douBt with Alex Maguire and Tony Bianco. Their debut album, Never Pet a Burning Dog, included ex-Camel, Caravan and Hatfield and the North member Richard Sinclair on guest vocals and bass. In 2010 he was invited to join and coordinate Comicoperando, a tribute to the music of Robert Wyatt whose line-up includes Dagmar Krause, Richard Sinclair, Annie Whitehead, Gilad Atzmon, Alex Maguire, Chris Cutler, John Edwards, and Cristiano Calcagnile. In 2011 the band toured Europe and Canada as a sextet in 2011. In 2012, Delville collaborated with the international collective 48 Cameras and Robin Rimbaud. In 2018 he was voted one of the 3 best electric guitarists of the year by Arnaldo DeSouteiro's Annual Jazz Station Poll.

== Selected bibliography ==
As author

- Erasurism (w. Louis Armand; Dallas: SMU/Bridwell Press, Project Poëtica, 2026)
- Tutto quello che non-avreste mai voluto leggere—o rileggere—sul fotoromanzo. Una passeggiata (w. Luciano Curreri and Giuseppe Palumbo; Bologna: Comma22, 2021; French translation by Vittorio Frigerio, Presses Universitaires de Limoges, 2024)
- Le roman de la faim: du Hungerkünstler au schizoflâneur (Rome/Macerata: Quodlibet, 2021)
- Jim Hendrix: Are Your Experienced (Paris/Rouen: Editions Densité, 2019)
- The Politics and Aesthetics of Hunger and Disgust (w. Andrew Norris; New York/London: Routledge, 2017)
- Undoing Art (w. Mary Ann Caws; Roma/Macerata: Quodlibet, 2017)
- Ali e t o lo ss (w. Elisabeth Waltregny; Stockholm: Trolltrumma, 2017)
- Anything & Everything (trans. Gian Lombardo; Niantic, CT: Quale Press, 2016)
- Radiohead: OK Computer (Paris/Rouen: Editions Densité, 2015)
- Crossroads Poetics: Text, Image, Music, Film & Beyond (Prague: Litteraria Pragensia/Charles University Prague, 2013)
- Entre la poire et le fromage (Lyon/Marseille: Editions Kirographaires, 2013)
- Eating the Avant-Garde (Routledge, 2008)
- Frank Zappa, Captain Beefheart and the Secret History of Maximalism (cowritten with Andrew Norris; Salt Publishing, 2005)
- Le Troisième corps (Le Fram, 2004) (poetry collection). Translated into English by Gian Lombardo as Third Body (Florence, MA: Quale Press, 2009)
- Hamlet & Co (w. Pierre Michel; Editions de l'ULg, 2003)
- The American Prose Poem (The University of Florida Press, 1998)
- J.G. Ballard (Northcote House/The British Council, 1998)

As editor or co-editor

- The Edinburgh Companion to the Prose Poem (w. Mary Ann Caws; Edinburgh: Edinburgh University Press, 2021)
- Early Prose Poems from All Over (w. Mary Ann Caws; New York: Manifold/CUNY – Boston, Black Widow

Press, 2021)

- The French Prose Poem: An Anthology (w. Mary Ann Caws; New York: New York Review Books, 2023)
- Poe: Eureka (w. Jean-Pierre Bertrand; Paris: Gallimard, 2019)
- Literature Now: Key Terms and Methods for Literary History (w. Sascha Bru and Ben de Bruyn; Edinburgh: Edinburgh University Press, 2015)
- Il grande incubo che mi son scelto: prove di avvicinamento a Profondo Rosso (w. Luciano Curreri; Piombino: Edizioni Il Foglio, 2015)
- Le thriller métaphysique (w. Antoine Dechêne; Liège: Presses Universitaires de Liège, 2015)
- Marc Atkins (Liège: Collections artistiques de l'Université de Liège, 2015)
- Le dégoût: Histoire, politique et esthétique d'une émotion plurielle (w. Andrew Norris and Viktoria von Hoffmann; Liège: Presses Universitaires de Liège, 2015)
- Boucle et répétition: musique, littérature, arts visuels (w. Livio Belloï, Christophe Levaux and Christophe Pirenne; Liège: Presses Universitaires de Liège, 2014)
- L’œuvre en morceaux : Esthétiques de la mosaïque (w. Livio Belloï; Paris : Les Impressions Nouvelles, 2006)
- Le Rossignol instrumental : Poésie, musique, modernité. (w. Jean-Pierre Bertrand and Christine Pagnoulle; Leuven, Paris, Dudley, MA : Peeters/Vrin, 2004)
- Sound as Sense: US Poetry &/In Music (w. Christine Pagnoulle; Brussels, Bern, Frankfurt, New York : Presses Interuniversitaires Européennes-Peter Lang, 2003)
- Postwar American Poetry: The Mechanics of the Mirage (w. Christine Pagnoulle; Liège: L3, 2000)

== Selected discography ==
- The Wrong Object feat. Ed Mann Live at Zappanale (Arf Records, 2005)
- The Wrong Object, The Unbelievable Truth (Moonjune, 2006) featuring Elton Dean
- The Wrong Object, Platform One (Voiceprint, 2007) feat. Harry Beckett and Annie Whitehead
- Trank Zappa Grappa in Varèse, More Light (Fazzul Music, 2007)
- PaNoPTiCoN, Live at L'An Vert (After-Z Productions, 2008)
- The Wrong Object, Stories from the Shed (studio release; Moonjune, January 2008)
- Alex Maguire Sextet, Brewed in Belgium (Moonjune, 2008)
- Trank Zappa Grappa in Varèse, TZGIV Play Zappa (Fazzul, 2009)
- PaNoPTiCoN, Dawn of the New World (After-Z, 2009)
- PaNoPTiCoN, Dusk of the New World (After-Z, 2009)
- The Wrong Object feat. Stanley Jason Zappa and Nick Shrowaczewski, Live at Zappanale 2008 (Fazzul, 2009)
- douBt (Alex Maguire/Michel Delville/Tony Bianco), Never Pet a Burning Dog (Moonjune, 2010)
- PaNoPTiCoN, Live @ El Negocito (After-Z, 2011)
- Machine Mass Trio (Tony Bianco/Michel Delville/Jordi Grognard), As Real as Thinking (Moonjune, 2011)
- 48 Cameras, Right North, she said ... (Interzone, 2012)
- douBt (Alex Maguire/Michel Delville/Tony Bianco), Mercy, Pity, Peace and Love (Moonjune, 2012)
- Comicoperando, Live at the Bimhuis (promo CD)
- NichelOdeon, Bath Salts (Lizard Rec/Den Rec, 2013)
- Robin Rimbaud/48Cameras, We Could Bring You Silk in May (Interzone, 2013)
- The Wrong Object, After the Exhibition (Moonjune, 2013)
- Machine Mass feat. Dave Liebman, Inti (Moonjune, 2014)
- Machine Mass, Plays Hendrix (Moonjune, 2017)
- Eclectic Maybe Band (Joe Higham, Michel Delville, Catherine Smet, Guy Segers, Dirk Wachterlaer) (Discus, 2018)
- The Wrong Object, Zappa Jawaka (Off, 2018)
- Dominique Vantomme w. Tony Levin/Michel Delville/Maxime Lenssens, Vegir (MoonJune, 2018)
- Eclectic Maybe Band, Reflection in a Moebius Ring Mirror (Discus, 2019)
- The Gödel Codex, Oak (Off/MoonJune, 2019)
- The Wrong Object, Into the Herd (Off/MoonJune, 2019)
- Machine Mass Sextet, Intrusion (Off/MoonJune, 2021)
- Eclectic Maybe Band, Again Alors? (Discus, 2022)
- Eclectic Maybe Band, Bars Without Measures (Discus, 2023)
- The Wrong Object, In and Outflown Tapes (Off/MoonJune, 2024)
- Eclectic Maybe Band, Cosmic Light Clusters (Discus, 2025)
- Eclectic Maybe Band, Domestic Dragon (Discus, 2026)
- Blutchings (Daniel Denis/Antoine Guenet/Michel Delville), Blutchings (Sub Rosa, 2026)

== Selected filmography ==
- The World According to Radiohead (Bridges/ARTE, 2019)
- Romantic Warriors Part III: Canterbury Tales (Zeitgeist Media, 2015)
- Michel Delville : Portrait (Zero4 TV, 2012)
- Comicoperando Live In Amsterdam (PanRec, 2012)
- The Wrong Object feat. Ed Mann Live at Zappanale (Arf Records, 2005)
