= Mark Wingfield =

Background information
- Born: UK
- Genres: Pop, rock
- Occupation: Musician
- Instrument: Guitar
- Labels: Dark Energy Music, MR, Moonjune
- Website: markwingfield.com

Mark Wingfield is an English guitarist and composer based in the UK. Most of his output is rooted in jazz, but he is also active in contemporary classical music. Much of his output is directed towards performing and studio work. Wingfield cites jazz, rock, Indian, Japanese, African, and classical music as influences has written over 70 compositions. He attempts to combine these with classical music.

He has worked with Iain Ballamy, Gary Husband, Markus Reuter, Kevin Kastning, Asaf Sirkis, Thomas Strønen, Jeremy Stacey, Robert Mitchell, and René von Grüenig.

== Biography ==
=== Background ===
Wingfield spent the first part of his childhood in England before moving to America with his family and then later returning to England. An interest in jazz lead him to begin playing in Europe where he worked as composer and performer, touring and recording with various jazz groups including SMQ, Scapetrace, as well as his own groups.

Though primarily self-taught, he studied orchestration with Colin Huens, music fellow at the University of Cambridge. He also studied western and non-western classical musical forms, and further developed his interest in Indian, African and Japanese music.

=== As a performer ===
As a guitarist, Wingfield cites jazz influences such as John Coltrane, Miles Davis, Keith Jarrett and Jan Garbarek, as well as rock players such as Jimi Hendrix.

On his album Fallen Cities, he collaborated with Lebanese singer Samia Afra and continued his interest in non-western forms, working and performing with Turkish musicians Gökhan Özyavuz in Istanbul and Zambian musician KT Lumpa.

Wingfield's interest in music technology came to the fore when he was asked by songwriter Willy Henshall of Londonbeat to join ResRocket, a band made up of musicians from around the world who played together live over the internet using specially developed software. As a core member of ResRocket, as well as recording an album, he toured with the band, playing in London, Paris, Los Angeles, and Oslo. During concerts, some of the members were on stage, while others played live over the internet projected on giant screens on stage.

Wingfield has played with his own band and various collaborations widely in Europe and the Eastern United States. He has records for the New York City label Moonjune Records as well as for Dark Energy Music, and Greydisc.

=== Composition ===
His compositions were the subject of a lecture at Goldsmiths College, London in 2006 to mark the opening of its new Contemporary Music Department and have also been featured in lectures and workshops at the Royal College of Music in London, Trinity College of Music in London, and Dartington College of Arts music department.

The growing interest in his work has led to commissions for the BMICs Cutting Edge Series, SPNM's Sound Source, the European Commission funded Waterways Celebration, Kathryn Stott, Jane Chapman, Kate Ryder, Elaine Funaro, Geoffrey Burgess, and McFall's Chamber.

His compositions have been performed in concert halls and festivals in cities across the UK including, London, Bath, Manchester, Leeds, Birmingham and Southampton. His work has also been performed in New York City, Zurich, and Luzern.

== Discography ==
- Guitar Encryptions (Dark Energy, 2006)
- Liquid Maps (Dark Energy, 2006)
- Sleeper Street (Dark Energy, 2009)
- Proof of Light with Yaron Stavi, Asaf Sirkis (MoonJune, 2015)
- The Stone House with Reuter, Stavi, Sirkis (MoonJune, 2016)
- The Line to Three with Kevin Kastning (Greydisc, 2017)
- Lighthouse with Reuter, Sirkis (MoonJune, 2017)
- Tales from the Dreaming City (MoonJune, 2018)
- The Gathering (MoonJune, 2024)
