= Comicoperando =

Musical collective

Comicoperando is a musical collective dedicated to the music of Canterbury scene legend, singer and songwriter Robert Wyatt. The band's debut concert, which world-premiered at the Teatro Communale Luciano Pavarotti in Modena, Italy, in March 2010. It featured prominent Canterbury scene-affiliated musicians Dagmar Krause (Henry Cow, Slapp Happy, Art Bears), Chris Cutler (Henry Cow, Art Bears, Peter Blegvad Trio) and Richard Sinclair (Caravan, Camel, Hatfield and the North), alongside Wyatt's longtime collaborators Annie Whitehead and Gilad Atzmon, Alex Maguire, Michel Delville, John Edwards and Cristiano Calcagnile.

Their repertoire includes re-arranged classics as such as "Alifib", "Little Red Riding Hood Hits the Road" and "Memories" as well as lesser-known numbers encompassing all of Wyatt's 40-odd-year career, from the early Soft Machine albums to Comicopera (2007), which inspired the collective's name.

A new incarnation of Comicoperando featuring Karen Mantler on vocals and organ toured Europe and America in the Spring of 2011.

== Discography ==
DVD

- Comicoperando, The Music of Robert Wyatt (PanRec, 2012)
