= Institute for the Study and Integration of Graphical Heritage Techniques =

American Computer Laboratory

- Company type: 501(c)(3) Non-profit
- Industry: CGI animation; motion pictures; software
- Predecessor: ECHO (Egyptian Cultural Heritage Operation), 1998-1999
- Founded: 1998 as ECHO; 2000 as INSIGHT
- Founder: Kevin Cain; Philippe Martinez; (incorporation as Institute for the Study and Integration of Graphical Heritage Techniques)
- Headquarters: Paris, France, France and United States
- Key people: Kevin Cain; Philippe Martinez
- Website: insightdigital.org

The Institute for the Study and Integration of Graphical Heritage Techniques (INSIGHT) is an American computer laboratory for archaeological visualization based in Berkeley, California. INSIGHT's principal work consists of archaeological documentation projects for academics, universities and non-governmental organizations. INSIGHT's work has been included in documentary films, including Sunken Treasures of the Nile, Queens of the Nile and Ramses II, the Great Journey.

INSIGHT began in 1998 as the Egyptian Cultural Heritage Operation (ECHO), with the support of the Center for Design Visualization at the University of California at Berkeley.
