= Choong Family =

British hip hop group

- Origin: United Kingdom
- Genres: Hip hop
- Labels: Eastside Gridlockaz Records (UK)
- Members: Afix; Scandal; H.T. Nutz P

Choong Family or Choong Fam as they are sometimes known, are a four-piece group originating from East London, consisting of rappers Afix and Nutz P, and singers Scandal and HT. They are best known for their single "More Murking". The group released their first album Higher Elevation in 2005.

== Discography ==
=== Albums ===
- 2005: Higher Elevation
- 2009: Baptism of Fire

=== Singles ===
- "Solitude"
- "Adrenaline"
- "Spray/Skank Music"
- "Pain Don't stop"
- "More Murking"
- "Fall Back"
- "Memory Lane", peaked at number 57 on the Official Charts UK Top 75s.
- "Injury Time"
- "I'm Choong"
