= Insight Credit Union =

Credit union based in Winter Springs, Florida, U.S.

- Formerly: Orlando District Employees Telco Federal Credit Union (1935–1965); Bell-Tel Federal Credit Union (1965–2003); Insight Financial Credit Union (2003–2010)
- Type: Credit union
- Industry: Financial services
- Founded: 1935; 91 years ago
- Headquarters: Winter Springs, Florida, U.S.
- Number of locations: 12 (2025)
- Area served: Central Florida
- Total assets: US$682.2 million (Q2 2025)
- Members: 43,773 (Q2 2025)
- Number of employees: 131 (Q2 2025)
- Website: insightcreditunion.com

Insight Credit Union is an American state-chartered credit union headquartered in Winter Springs, Florida. It offers financial services to individuals and businesses, including checking and savings accounts, loans, mortgages, credit cards, and online banking.

Insight Credit Union is federally insured by the National Credit Union Administration (NCUA) and provides both in-person branch services and digital banking. It maintains 12 branch locations throughout central Florida.

== History ==
It was founded in 1935 as Orlando District Employees Telco Federal Credit Union to serve employees of the telecommunications industry in central Florida. It changed its name to Bell-Tel Federal Credit Union in 1965.

In 1999, Bell-Tel acquired United Employees Credit Union (originally based out of Leesburg), and in 2000 it acquired Lake County Schools Credit Union (based out of Eustis). Bell-Tel rebranded as Insight Financial Credit Union in 2003 to reflect the expansion of its membership beyond the original telecommunications employees it served, and in 2010, the name was shortened to Insight Credit Union.

In 2024, it became the naming sponsor of the basketball and volleyball facility within the Edmunds Center at Stetson University, known as the Insight Credit Union Arena.
