= Gwilym Simcock =

Welsh pianist and composer

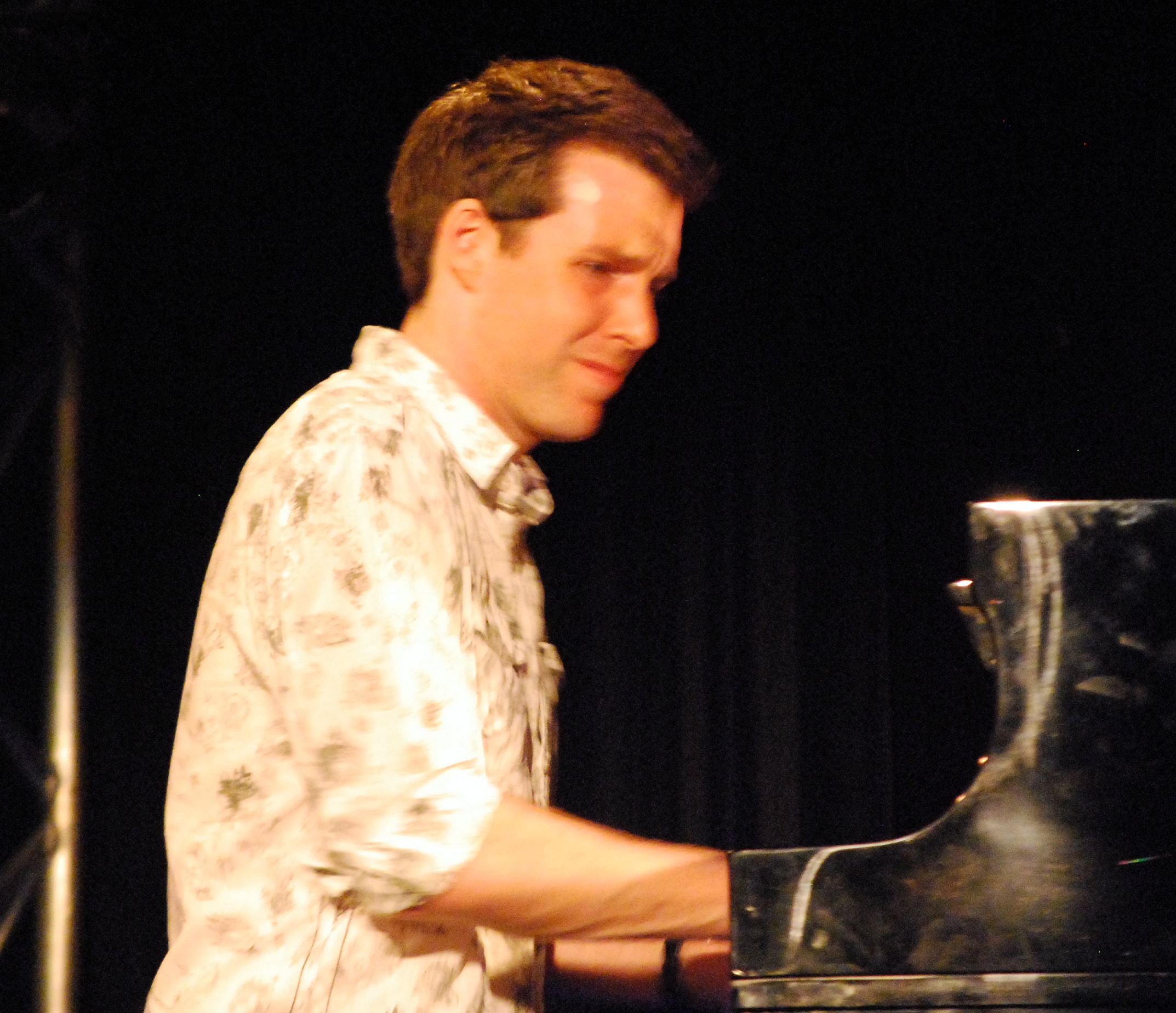

Background information
- Born: 24 February 1981 (age 45); Bangor, Gwynedd, Wales
- Genre: Jazz
- Occupations: Musician, composer
- Instrument: Piano
- Years active: 2000s–present
- Website: gwilymsimcock.com

Gwilym Simcock (born 24 February 1981) is a Welsh pianist and composer working in both jazz and classical music. He was chosen as one of the 1000 Most Influential People in London by the Evening Standard in 2009. He was featured on the front cover of the August 2007 issue of the UK's Jazzwise magazine.

== Early life ==
Simcock was born in Bangor, Gwynedd. At the age of 11 he attained the highest marks in the country for his Associated Board on both piano and French horn. He studied classical piano, French horn, and composition at Chetham's School, Manchester, where he was introduced to jazz by pianist and teacher Les Chisnall and bassist and teacher Steve Berry. He studied jazz piano at The Royal Academy of Music, London with John Taylor, Nikki Iles, Nick Weldon, and Geoff Keezer. He graduated from the Royal Academy of Music and won the "Principal's Prize" for outstanding achievement.

== Career ==
In 2006, he was the first jazz musician to be selected for the BBC Radio 3 New Generation Artists scheme, and this was extended to 2008. It involved broadcasts on BBC Radio 3 as solo performances, and his trio appearance at the Wigmore Hall during the London Jazz Festival 2006 (broadcast 7 July 2007).

In 2008, he was commissioned to perform at The Proms at the Royal Albert Hall in London. He composed a Piano Concerto "Progressions" which he performed with his trio and the BBC Concert Orchestra on 9 August 2008, broadcast live on the television channel BBC Two.

On 5 October 2008, he was featured in an evening at the King's Place Opening Festival in which he performed four concerts leading four different groups including a duo with John Taylor.

His trio, which has performed at festivals and venues worldwide such as the North Sea Jazz Festival 2007, features James Maddren (drums) and Yuri Goloubev (bass), while his debut album featured Stan Sulzmann, John Parricelli, Phil Donkin, Martin France, and Ben Bryant.

He was chosen by Chick Corea for a solo concert performance and live recording at Klavier Festival Ruhr 2007. This concert was broadcast on WDR radio and 20,000 copies were given away as a cover mount CD in Germany's leading music magazine Fonoforum.

He was a member of Tim Garland's Lighthouse Trio, but he left in 2013 and was replaced by John Turville. He was a member of Malcolm Creese's Acoustic Triangle, Stan Sulzmann's Neon, and Bill Bruford's Earthworks. He has also played with Dave Holland, Lee Konitz, Bob Mintzer, Bobby McFerrin, Kenny Wheeler, Iain Ballamy, Julian Argüelles, Pete King, Don Weller, Steve Waterman, and Torsten de Winkel / New York Jazz Guerrilla. He is a founding member of The Impossible Gentlemen.

He also plays French horn and has played with the National Youth Jazz Orchestra (NYJO), the BBC Big Band, and with Kenny Wheeler on his 2003/2005 tour.

He has toured with jazz guitarist Pat Metheny in a quartet with Linda Oh and Antonio Sanchez.

In 2011 his album Good Days At Schloss Elmau was one of the twelve nominees for the Mercury Music Prize, losing to PJ Harvey's Let England Shake.

In 2026 Gwilym was commissioned for the second time by BBC Radio3 to write a major work for the BBC Proms. This was Co-commission with BBC Proms, CBSO, Sofia Philharmonic and Antwerp Symphony Orchestra – Triple Concerto for Soprano Saxophone, Horn and Cello for Jess Gillam, Ben Goldscheider and Sheku Kanneh Mason.

== Commissions/collaborations ==
- A commission to compose and perform a piano concerto with the BBC Concert Orchestra at the Proms 2008 at the Royal Albert Hall in London (Progressions)
- A commission for a new work for the Aronowitz Ensemble at the City of London Festival, July 2008
- A commission and recording for a piano concerto with big band with the NDR Big Band in Germany (Hamburg Suite)
- A Big Band project at Cheltenham Jazz Festival 2007, broadcast on BBC Radio on 1 June 2007 (The Lichfield Suite)
- A 2007 commission and tour with The Scottish Ensemble (Chamber Orchestra), broadcast on 1 July 2007 on BBC Radio Scotland and again on BBC Radio 3 on 12 October
- Guest soloist on Mark Antony Turnage's commission with London Sinfonietta for the re-opening of the Southbank Centre at Queen Elizabeth Hall, June 2007
- A commission for the Britten Sinfonia, premiered at the London Jazz Festival 2007 (Jackie's Dance)
- New Horn Sonata performed at the Wigmore Hall with French horn player Chris Parkes
- Performed the première of Tim Garland's piano concerto with the Northern Sinfonia, May 2005
- A commission and major Arts Council-funded tour of cathedrals with Acoustic Triangle and Sacconi Strings, 2008
- Performing with his trio at the BBC Young Musician of the Year Jazz Award 2014 and 2016 with the finalists of the competition
- Commissions and performances (2024-2026) with the Oxford University Jazz Orchestra as part of a concert series in the Jacqueline du Pré Music Building
- 2026 Co-commission with BBC Proms, CBSO, Sofia Philharmonic and Antwerp Symphony Orchestra – Triple Concerto for Soprano Saxophone, Horn and Cello for Jess Gillam, Ben Goldscheider and Sheku Kanneh Mason

== Awards and nominations ==
- Winner of Perrier Award 2001: Young Jazz Ensemble
- Winner of BBC Jazz Award 2005: Rising Star
- Winner of British Jazz Award 2005: Rising Star
- BBC Radio 3 New Generation Artist 2006–2008
- All Party Parliamentary Jazz Awards – Jazz Musician of the Year 2007
- Barclaycard Mercury Album of the Year Good Days at Schloss Elmau (ACT 2011) 2011
- All Party Parliamentary Jazz Awards – Jazz Ensemble of the Year - The Impossible Gentlemen 2013
- Honorary Fellow at Royal Welsh College of Music and Drama, Cardiff 2020

== Discography ==
=== As leader ===
- Perception (Basho, 2007)
- Blues Vignette (Basho, 2009)
- Good Days At Schloss Elmau (ACT 2011)
- The Impossible Gentlemen - The Impossible Gentlemen (Basho, 2011)
- Internationally Recognised Aliens - The Impossible Gentlemen (Basho, 2013)
- Let's Get Deluxe - The Impossible Gentlemen (Basho, 2016)
- Instrumation (ACT, 2014)
- Reverie at Schloss Elmau with Yuri Goloubev (ACT, 2014)
- Birdsong with Kizzy Crawford (Basho, 2018)
- Near and Now (ACT, 2019)
- Big Visit (ACT 2024)

=== As sideman ===
- Catalyst - Acoustic Triangle (Audio B, 2003)
- Close to You - Kathleen Willison (Basho, 2004)
- Resonance - Acoustic Triangle (Audio B, 2005)
- If the Sea Replied - Tim Garland (Sirocco Music, 2005)
- Take Me Home - Kaz Simmons (33 Jazz, 2005)
- Heart Luggage - Klaus Gesing (ATS, 2006)
- Sax of Gold - Sax Assault (Astute Music, 2007)
- Traces - Dan Stern (Kvetch, 2007)
- Due North - Tim Garland (Jazzaction, 2007)
- Reverence - Spike Wells (Audio-B, 2007)
- Video Anthology Vol. 1: 2000's - Bill Bruford's Earthworks (Summerfold, 2007)
- SGS Group Inc. Presents - Simcock/Goloubev/Sirkis (Music Center, 2008)
- Give It One - London Horn Sound (Cala, 2008)
- Smoke and Mirrors - Tom Richards Orchestra (Candid, 2008)
- 3 Dimensions - Acoustic Triangle (Audio B, 2008)
- Finally Beginning - John Warren (Fuzzy Moon, 2008)
- Bimbache Jazz & Raíces, La Condición Humana (nyjg / ESC, 2008)
- Howeird - Sam Crockatt Quartet (Loop, 2009)
- Metafore Semplici - Yuri Goloubev (Universal, 2009)
- Libra - Tim Garland (Global Mix, 2009)
- Following On - John Warren (Fuzzy Moon, 2009)
- Momenta - Julian Arguelles (Basho, 2009)
- Quartet, Quintet with LSO Percussion Ensemble (2020)
- From This Place - Pat Metheny (Nonesuch, 2020)
- Vienna Chamber Diaries - Johannes Berauer (Basho 2022)
- Ocean Floor Ayanna Witter Johnson with LSO Percussion Ensemble (2024)

== Other sources ==
- spiegel.de
- https://web.archive.org/web/20080222093747/http://www.br-online.de/bayern4/sendungen/jazz/
- http://www.birminghampost.net/life-leisure-birmingham-guide/birmingham-culture/classical-music-birmingham/2007/11/29/britten-sinfonia-uncovers-hidden-treasure-65233-20180607/
