= Asaf Sirkis =

Israeli musical artist

Asaf Sirkis אסף סירקיס
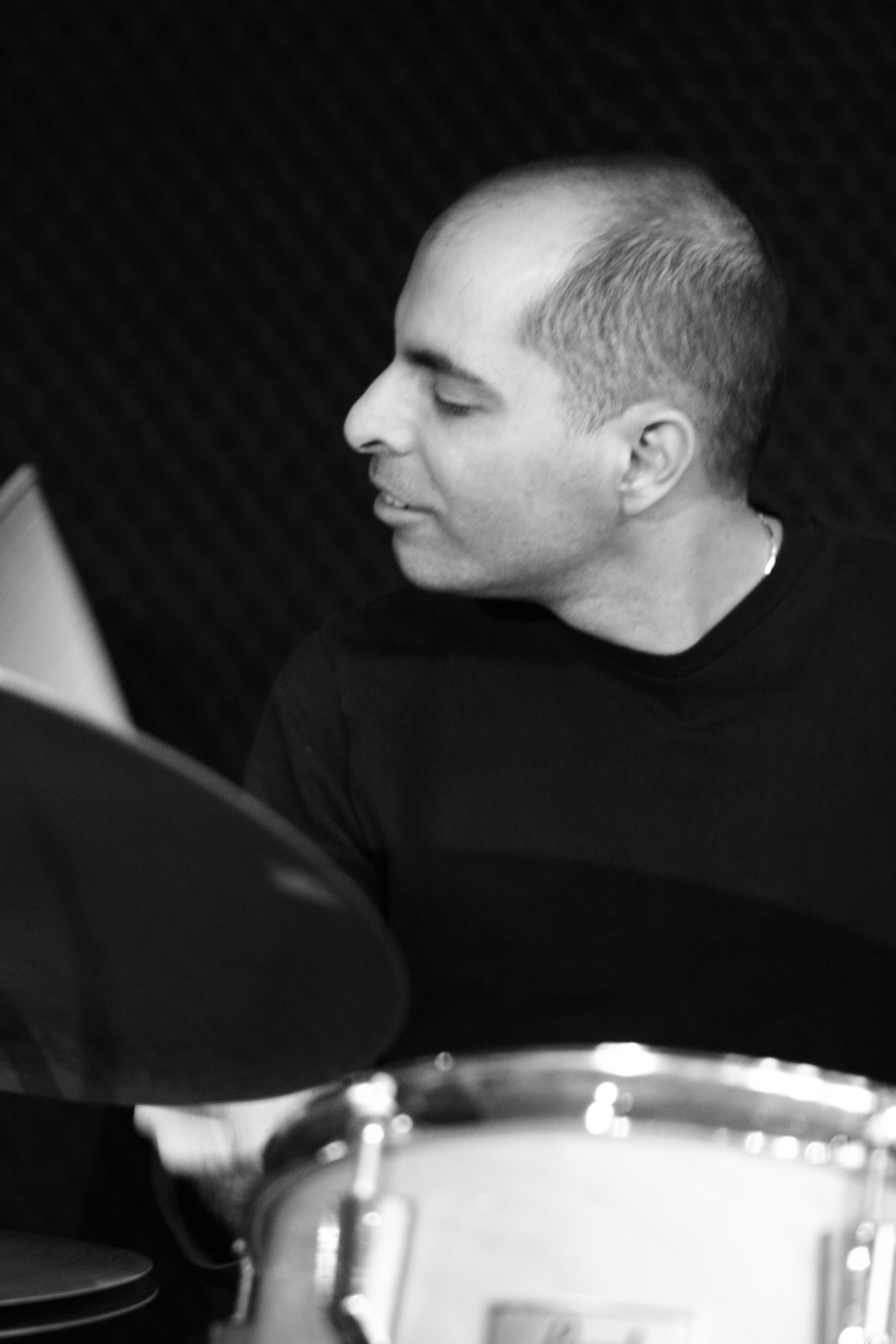
- Sirkis playing the drums in 2014

Background information
- Born: March 22, 1969 (age 57); Petah Tikva, Israel
- Genres: Jazz fusion, rock, world music
- Occupations: Musician, composer, educator
- Instrument: Drums
- Years active: 1989–present
- Labels: Stonedbird, Moonjune, ACT, Universal, 33 Records, CAM Jazz, Caligula
- Website: asafsirkis.com

Asaf Sirkis (Hebrew: אסף סירקיס; born 1969) is an Israeli jazz drummer, composer and educator. He has been a member of the jazz rock band Soft Machine since 2023 replacing long time member John Marshall.

== Early life ==
Born in Petah-Tikva in 1969, Sirkis spent his teens and early twenties in Rehovot, Israel where he began drum lessons aged 12. His early musical influences were The Beatles, The Police, Yes, Allan Holdsworth, Weather Report, classical music, Arabic, Balkan, Klezmer, Pop, and Israeli folk music. In 1990, shortly after he completed his three-year national service he started his full-time professional career working as an all-around drummer in Israel. He has played with notable jazz musicians from Israel and abroad including Harold Rubin, Albert Beger, Yair Dalal and Eyal Sela.

== Education ==
Sirkis begun drum lessons at 12 years old with a local drum tutor in Rehovot, Israel. After a couple of years, he started drum lessons with David Rich at the Metronome drum school in Tel-Aviv until around 1990.

Later, around 2009 in London Asaf studied the art of the south Indian vocal percussion (Konnakol) at the Tamil centre in west London under the guidance of master percussionist Paramasamy Kirupakaran and from various other sources.

Around 2018 and for the next 6 years, Asaf studied drum technique with Mr. Bruce Becker, a longtime student of Freddie Gruber.

== Career ==
In 1993 Sirkis moved to Tel Aviv and soon after formed the Asaf Sirkis trio featuring Kobi Arad on keyboards, and Gabriel Mayer on electric bass. With that line up he recorded his first solo album One Step Closer (1996) as well as touring in Israel with the trio. In 1996 he formed the 'Asaf Sirkis & The Inner Noise' trio. The Inner Noise was a trio featuring church organ, guitar and drums and was the first jazz/rock group documented with this line up. The Inner Noise' first project was funded by the Tel-Aviv city council in 1997.

Asaf left Israel in 1998, settling in London in 1999. Soon after arriving in the UK, Sirkis re-formed the Inner Noise trio with Steve Lodder on church organ and Mike Outram on guitar. The band has recorded three acclaimed albums - Inner Noise, We Are Falling and The Song Within. Around 2000, he met reeds player and composer Gilad Atzmon with whom he formed The Orient House Ensemble and recorded 7 albums, including Exile, which won "Best CD of the Year" at the BBC Jazz Award 2003 while the band was nominated for "Best Band" in 2004. After almost 9 years in the OHE, Sirkis left the band in 2009 to focus on his solo career and other collaborations.

Since 2006, Sirkis has been collaborating with reed player and composer Tim Garland with whom he toured internationally and recorded many albums including 'Lighthouse' with the Lighthouse trio featuring Gwilym Simcock on piano, Tim Garland on reeds and Asaf on a drums-percussion hybrid kit, as well as Garland's album 'One'.

From 2014 to 2019, Sirkis co-lead the Sirkis/Bialas International Quartet together with Polish singer/composer Sylwia Bialas. The Quartet featured pianist Frank Harrison and Bassist Patrick Bettison (on the album 'Come To Me'), and later Scottish bassist Kevin Glasgow (on the album 'Our New Earth'). Their debut album Come To Me was launched at the London Jazz Festival in 2015. Come To Me has been selected as one of the best albums of 2015 at All About Jazz website by several reviewers and the band has toured extensively. The Quartet's second double album 'Our New Earth' was released in 2019 on the Moonjune Records label.

Since 2016, Asaf has collaborated with various artists on the Moonjune Records label. Notably, The Wingfield/Reuter/Stavi/Sirkis album, The Stone House, has received a 5 star review at the July 2017 issue of DownBeat magazine. Sirkis has also appeared on many Moonjune releases with artists including Spanish guitarist Carles Benavent, Nguyen Le, Dewa Budjana, Indonesian pianist Dwiki Dharmawan, Gary Husband, Mark Wingfield, Markus Reuter, Jorge Pardo, Beledo and many more.

As of 2017, he was a principal lecturer at Leeds College of Music and Trinity Laban Conservatory of music and dance where he taught jazz drums and rhythmic training (Konnakol).

In January 2023, Sirkis joined the British jazz-rock group Soft Machine and has toured internationally with the band. He recorded a single for the My Only Wish record label, released in 2024, and performed on the band’s 13th studio album, released in March 2026, which features him on drums and piano and includes three of his compositions..

In July 2026 Asaf received the Moonjune Lifetime Achievement in Music Award at the 4th Moonjune international festival. Also in 2026, Asaf released his debut Piano Solo album, Letters.

Asaf has performed and recorded with numerous international artists such as pianist Gwilym Simcock, John Abercrombie, Kenny Wheeler, Norma Winstone, John Taylor, saxophonist Andy Sheppard, Dave Liebman, Natacha Atlas, Bob Sheppard, Mark Egan, Mark Wingfield, Nicolas Meier, David Binney, Norman Watt-Roy, Wilko Johnson, Billy Sherwood, bassist Jeff Berlin, bassist Dave Holland, Jacob Collier, Larry Coryell, Robert Wyatt, Kenny Wheeler, Wilko Johnson, Celine Bonacina, Eyal Maoz, John Law (musician), Christine Tobin, Julian Siegel, Peter King and many more.

== Discography ==
=== As leader and collaborator ===
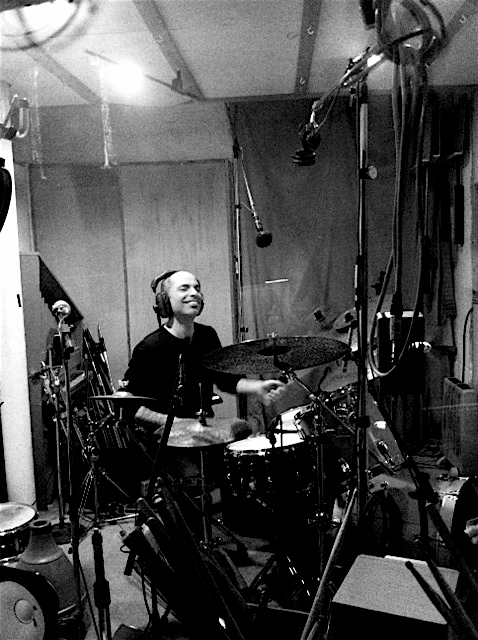
Asaf recording at Eascote Studios, London 2014

- (2026) Soft Machine, 'Clowns And Jugglers' (a tribute to Syd Barrett)
- (2026) Asaf Sirkis, Letters (piano solo)
- (2026) Soft Machine, Thirteen
- (2025) Soft Machine, Slightly (Slightly) All The Time
- (2024) Asaf Sirkis, The Journey Is You
- (2022) Asaf Sirkis, *Solar flash
- (2019) The Sirkis/Bialas International Quartet, Our New Earth
- (2016) Asaf Sirkis, "Full Moon"
- (2014) The Sirkis/Bialas International Quartet, Come to Me
- (2013) Asaf Sirkis Trio, Shepherd's Stories
- (2012) Simcock/Garland/Sirkis, Lighthouse ACT
- (2010) Asaf Sirkis Trio, Letting Go
- (2008) Asar Sirkis Trio, The Monk
- (2007) Asaf Sirkis & The Inner Noise, The Song Within
- (2005) Asaf Sirkis & The Inner Noise, We are Falling
- (2003) Asaf Sirkis & The Inner Noise, Inner Noise
- (1998) Asaf Sirkis Trio, One Step Closer

=== Educational Releases ===
- (2022) Time For Space drum play-along, Vol. 1
- (2022) Time For Space drum play-along, Vol. 2
- (2022) Time For Space drum play-along, Vol. 3
- (2023) Time For Space drum play-along, Vol. 4
- (2023) Time For Space drum play-along, Vol. 5
- (2023) Time For Space drum play-along, Vol. 6
- (2024) Time For Space drum play-along, Vol. 7
- (2025) Time For Space drum play-along, Vol. 8

=== As a sideman ===
- (1990) Biological Madness – Biological Madness
- (1991) Odeon – Odeon
- (1992) Tact – Downtown
- (1993) Harold Rubin – Trialog
- (1993) Changes – Changes
- (1994) Rami Shuler – With One Breath
- (1994) Return to Zero – Return to Zero
- (1994) Fantasy Jazz Trio – F.J.T.
- (1995) Albert Beger – The Primitive
- (1995) Return to Zero – Back for More
- (1996) Harold Rubin – Blue Bag
- (1997) Albert Beger – This Life
- (1997) Amir Perelman Trio – Trio 97 Vol. 1
- (1998) Eyal Maoz & Asaf Sirkis – Freedom Has Its Own Taste
- (1999) Christoph Spendel – The Three Worlds
- (1999) Adel Salameh – Nuzha
- (2000) Gilad Atzmon & the Orient House Ensemble – Orient House
- (2001) Eyal Sela – Sela
- (2001) Gilad Atzmon & the Orient House Ensemble – Nostalgico
- (2001) Various Artists – The More We Know: 30 Years of Enja Records
- (2001) Nick Homes – Not Tonight
- (2002) The Meier Group – Ribbon in the Wind
- (2002) Simon Fisher Turner – Swift
- (2002) Phil Robson – Impish
- (2002) Mark Latimer – Unhinged, Take 2
- (2002) Lee Gibson – Songs of Time And Place
- (2003) Gilad Atzmon and the Orient House Ensemble – Exile
- (2003) John Williams – Tenorama
- (2003) Nick Homes – Indian Summer
- (2004) Gilad Atzmon & the Orient House Ensemble – MusiK
- (2005) Tim Garland's Lighthouse – If The Sea Replied
- (2005) Nicolas Meier Group – Orient
- (2005) Simon Fisher Turner – LANA LARA LATA
- (2005) Tassos Spiliotopoulos Quartet – Wait for Dusk
- (2005) John Donaldson Trio – Music Box
- (2006) Alcyona Mick – Around the Sun
- (2006) Gilad Atzmon Presents Artie Fishel & The Promised Band – Artie Fishel
- (2006) Klaus Gesing – Heart Luggage
- (2007) Nicolas Meier – YUZ
- (2007) Glauco Venier & Yuri Goloubev – Homage a Duke
- (2007) Sirkis/Venier/Goloubev – Intermezzo
- (2007) Tim Garland – The Mystery (featuring Chick Corea)
- (2007) Law/Burgess/Sirkis – The Art of Sound Volume 1
- (2007) Gilad Atzmon & The Orient House Ensemble – Refuge
- (2007) Dan Stern – Traces
- (2007) Tim Garland – The Northern Underground Orchestra
- (2008) SGS Group (Sirkis/Goloubev/Simcock) – Presents...
- (2008) Nicolas Meier – Silence Talks
- (2008) Massimo Colombo Trio – Il Goico Delle Forme
- (2009) Sarah Gillespie – Stalking Juliet
- (2009) Tim Garland Lighthouse Trio – Libra
- (2009) Yuri Goloubev – Metafore Semplici
- (2009) Gilad Atzmon – In Loving Memory of America
- (2009) Polly Scattergood – Polly Scattergood
- (2009) John Law's Art of Sound Trio – Volume 4, Congregation
- (2009) Nicolas Meier – Journey
- (2009) Simon Fisher Turner – Music From Films You Should Have Seen
- (2009) Nicolas Meier Trios – Breeze
- (2009) Asaf Sirkis & Eyal Maoz Duo – Elementary Dialogues
- (2010) Asaf Sirkis/Sassi Mizrachi/Kobi Arad – Vagabond
- (2010) Jonathan Cohen's Time Loves Changes Octet – Life Cycles
- (2010) Tassos Spiliotopoulos – Archipelagos
- (2011) Alex Hutton Trio – Legentis
- (2011) Yuri Goloubev Trio – Titanic for a Bike
- (2011) Carlo Magni Quartet – Notturni
- (2012) John Law Congregation Featuring Asaf Sirkis & Yuri Goloubev – Three Leaps of the Gazelle
- (2013) Nicolas Meier Group – From Istanbul to Ceuta With a Smile
- (2013) Maciek Pysz Trio – Insight
- (2013) Norman Watt-Roy – Faith & Grace
- (2014) Tim Garland's Lighthouse – Songs For The North Sky
- (2014) Fabienne Ambuhl Trio – Glitterwood
- (2015) Mark Wingfield – Proof of Light
- (2015) Alex Hutton Trio – Magna Carta Suit
- (2015) Noel Langley – Edentide
- (2015) Maciek Pysz – A Journey
- (2016) Marco Cortesi – Spring Thing
- (2016) Celine Bonacina – Crystal Rain
- (2016) Tim Garland – One
- (2017) Dwiki Dharmawan – Pasar Klewer
- (2017) Wingfield/Reuter/Stavi/Sirkis – The Stone House
- (2017) Dusan Jevtovic – No Answer
- (2017) Wingfield/Reuter/Sirkis – Lighthouse
- (2018) Mark Wingfield – Tales from the Dreaming City
- (2018) The Lie Detectors – Secret Unit
- (2018) Dwiki Dharmawan – Rumah Batu
- (2018) Ant Law – Life I Know (guest appearance)
- (2019) Markus Reuter – Truce
- (2020) Markus Reuter – Oculus
- (2020) Dwiki Dharmawan – Hari Ketiga
- (2020) Tim Garland – Refocus
- (2020) Nicolas Meier & Dewa Budjana – Flying Spirits
- (2021) Markus Reuter – Truce 2
- (2022) Anchor And Burden – Kosmonautik Pilgrimage
- (2023) Emma Rawicz – Croma
- (2024) Mark Wingfield – The Gathering
- (2024) Beledo – Flotando en el vacio
- (2024) Tonnen Von Hall, Antlitz
- (2025) Markus Reuter – Truce 3
- (2025) Tonnen Von Hall, Ein Abdruck vom Messer im Herzen
- (2026) Tonnen Von Hall, Donnermesser
- (2026) Emma Rawicz, Paintbox
