= Glauco Venier =

Italian jazz pianist and composer (born 1962)

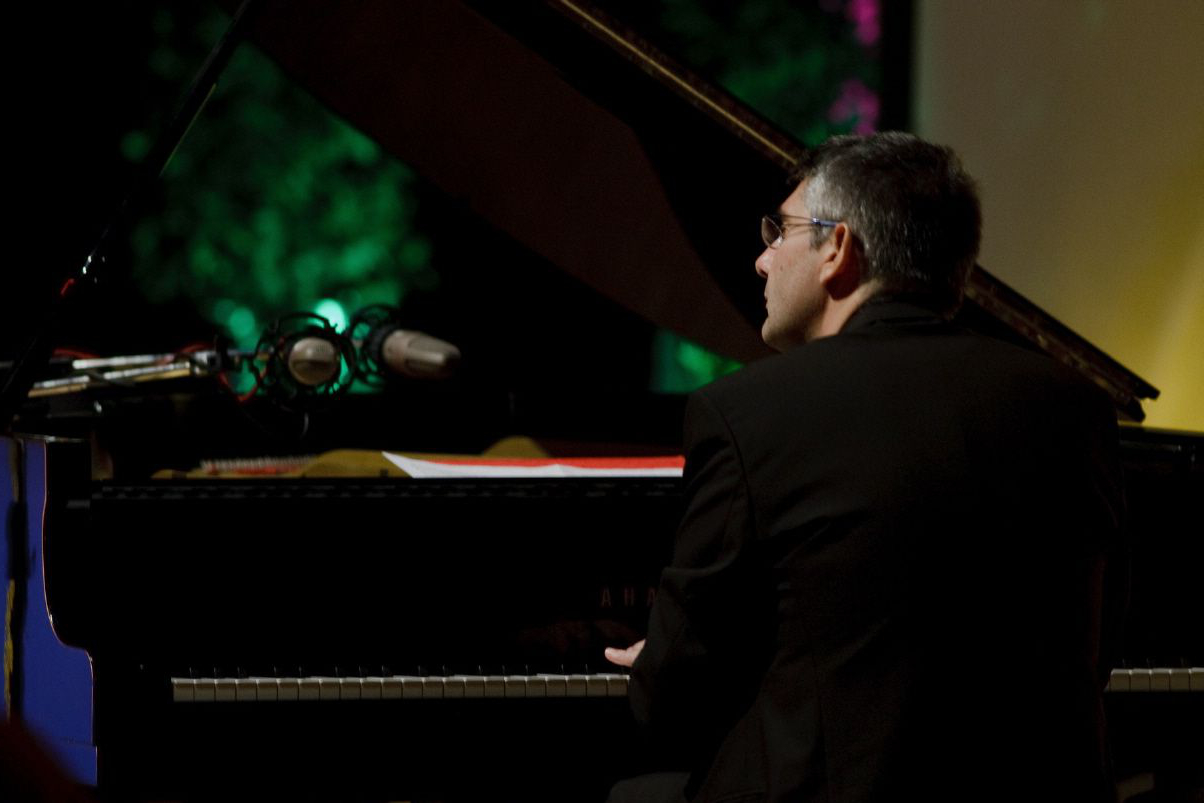
- Venierglauco

Background information
- Born: 8 September 1962 (age 63); Sedegliano, Udine, Italy
- Genres: Jazz
- Occupations: Musician, composer
- Instrument: Piano
- Years active: 1990s–present

Glauco Venier (born 8 September 1962) is an Italian jazz pianist and composer.

== Life and career ==
Venier was born in Sedegliano, Udine on 8 September 1962. He "graduated in organ and composition from the Udine Conservatory in 1985, then took private lessons with Franco d'Andrea before heading to Boston's Berklee School." "He has led his own bands since 1990".

Venier has performed and recorded as a trio with vocalist Norma Winstone and reeds player Klaus Gesing since the early 2000s. Their 2007 album Distances was nominated for a Grammy in the Best Jazz Vocal Album category.

== Discography ==
An asterisk (*) indicates that the year is that of release.

=== As leader/co-leader ===
Year recorded	Title	Label	Personnel/Notes
2002*	Chamber Music	Universal	Trio, co-led with Klaus Gesing (), Norma Winstone (vocals)
2007*	Intermezzo		Trio
2007	Distances	ECM	Trio, co-led with Klaus Gesing (soprano sax, bass clarinet), Norma Winstone (vocals)
2009*	Stories Yet to Tell	ECM	Trio, co-led with Klaus Gesing (soprano sax, bass clarinet), Norma Winstone (vocals)
2014*	Dance Without Answer	ECM	Trio, co-led with Klaus Gesing (soprano sax, bass clarinet), Norma Winstone (vocals)
2016*	Miniatures	ECM	Solo piano and percussion
