= Maciek Pysz =

- Born: 6 September 1982 (age 44); Rybnik, Poland
- Genres: Jazz, Contemporary Jazz, World Music
- Occupations: Guitarist, Composer
- Instrument: Guitar
- Years active: 2003–present
- Labels: 33Jazz Records, Dot Time Records, Caligola Records, Ozella Music, ABeat Records
- Website: www.maciekpysz.com

Maciek Pysz (born 6 September 1982 in Rybnik, Poland) is a jazz musician, guitarist and composer. He is known for his clear lyrical phrasing, his virtuosity and his imaginative, cinematic compositions inspired by people, places and experiences. His music draws on jazz, classical music, tango, flamenco and Brazilian music, and is characterised by a melodic and lyrical approach to composition and improvisation. Pysz had moved to London in 2003 where he established the Maciek Pysz Trio in 2008. He has released several albums as leader including Insight (2013), A Journey (2015), London Stories (2017), Coming Home (2017), A View (2019) and Pont De Vie (2026).

== Career ==
Maciek Pysz is a self-taught musician, who has been playing guitar since the age of 9. He has been inspired by musicians such as Al Di Meola, Sylvain Luc, Pat Metheny, John McLaughlin, Keith Jarrett, Biréli Lagrène, Chick Corea and Ralph Towner. Pysz plays acoustic and classical guitars and his influences come from tango, flamenco, Latin, jazz, Brazilian and classical music. His compositions are known for their lyricism, well developed melodic sense, and imagination. He moved to London in 2003 and established his first project, the Maciek Pysz Trio, in 2008 and recorded his first EP Discoveries the same year. Touring and collaborations followed, including a quartet with the addition of accordionist/pianist Maurizio Minardi and harmonica player Patrick Bettison. He appeared on Polish National TV in 2010, and established his trio with drummer Asaf Sirkis and bassist Yuri Goloubev. He appeared at the Blue Note Jazz Club in Poland in 2011. In 2012 he was a recipient of the UK's Jazz Services Recording Support Scheme (funded by the UK Arts Council).

In February 2013, Pysz recorded his debut album Insight with his trio at Artesuono Studio in Udine, Italy with acclaimed sound engineer Stefano Amerio from ECM Records. The album was released in May 2013 on 33 Jazz Records. The critic Stephen Graham wrote [this is] "an album that announces a major new presence on the jazz guitar scene" and "There is real musicianship as in the quality of the guitar solo on 'Moody Leaf'. Even Pat Metheny would be proud of this one." Ian Mann wrote "Pysz's highly melodic writing and well delineated and unhurried playing style make for a highly satisfying and often beautiful album." Tracks from the album featured on several occasions on Polskie Radio. and, on Jazz FM (UK) and BBC Radio 3 Jazz Record Requests He performed at London Jazz Festival in 2013.

In 2009, Pysz was a member of the Somali singer-songwriter Aar Maanta's band. In 2014, he played guitar on Maanta's song "Deeqa".

In 2014, Pysz received funding from the UK's Jazz Services National Touring Support Scheme. The funds enabled the trio to complete a UK-wide promotional tour in the spring of 2014, including a concert at London's PizzaExpress Jazz Club, which featured a guest appearance with the trio by Grammy award winner, British saxophonist, Tim Garland. The critic Peter Bacon, writing in the Birmingham Post wrote "Their album, called Insight, was released last year and shows Pysz to be an exceptionally accomplished and wide-ranging musician on both acoustic and classical guitars."

In early 2014, Pysz recorded a new album, with Italian guitarist Gianluca Corona. The album, London Stories was released in 2017 on 33 Jazz Records. He also featured on an album released in mid-2014 by Polish singer Monika Lidke If I was to describe you which featured bass player Janek Gwizdala and singer Basia Trzetrzelewska.

In late December 2014 he recorded his second album, A Journey with Yuri Goloubev, Asaf Sirkis and Daniele di Bonaventura at Artesuono Studio. It was released worldwide in October 2015 on Dot Time Records. He received funding for his November 2015 album launch tour of the UK from Arts Council England. The 19 date UK tour received favourable reviews. Of a performance in Newcastle, the reviewer Lance Liddle wrote “From the start it was obvious that this was going to be something special … Pysz had the audience enthralled." Sebastian Scotney of London Jazz News attended the album launch at The Forge, London and wrote "increasingly Pysz is finding his own individual descriptive harmonic colours, and is with the right colleagues to explore them further."

On 23 February 2016 Pysz appeared at London's PizzaExpress Jazz Club with his Quartet. The critic for Central and Eastern European London Review wrote "The genius of the quartet included achieving sounds both layered and deep with the efforts and skill of just four instruments or, at frequent moments, even fewer." In late 2016 Pysz formed a duo with British pianist Ivo Neame. Ian Mann described their first performance at The Arena Wolverhampton as "An excellent showing from Neame and Pysz, and I'm certain that their already impressive rapport will continue to develop." Since 2014 Pysz has been a member of Sur Amar Pysz Inwardness [formerly One Million Faces], a group playing improvised music and based in the South of France. Of one of their performances in Biot, France a critic said “One Million Faces offers stunning music, open, both avant-garde and very accessible...”. ". The band made its UK debut at Manchester Jazz Festival 2017 and the London Jazz News reviewer wrote "Three unscripted, immersive pieces, across a full hour... This trio’s improvisations evolve both organically and patiently, their emotional reach potentially quite powerful...". And Jazzwise praised their "subtly dynamic, ambient tone poems".

== Instruments ==
Pysz mainly plays acoustic and flamenco/classical guitars with various models of Godin guitar. While his favourite guitar is a Godin Grand Concert SA, he also plays a Tanglewood steel string acoustic guitar.

== Style ==
Pysz mostly plays with a plectrum and has his own picking style, he uses a lot of rhythm variations in his playing, and sometimes uses a fingerstyle, often switching from one to the other in one song. His style is soft, clean, melodic and highly emotional. Of his style on Insight, the critic Jack Massarik in Jazzwise said [this is] "Melodic music played with sensitivity and conviction in a style that borrows more from folk and contemporary classical music than jazz...". Bruce Lindsay in All About Jazz wrote "Pysz favors a crystal clear acoustic sound, delicate yet precise finger-work and fluid melodies. Pysz overdubs lead and rhythm guitar on much of the album, creating a fuller, richer sound in so doing. "Those Days" is a fine opening track: Pysz' lead lines are forceful and upbeat, his rhythm playing full-toned." In London Jazz News, John Watson wrote of a performance in March 2017 "However impressive his technique may be, it is certainly not “showy” – everything is at the service of creative expression."

== Insight ==
Insight was released in May 2013 on 33 Jazz Records. All tracks are composed by Pysz, except track 3, which is jointly composed and arranged by Gianluca Corona and Maciek Pysz.

Personnel

- Maciek Pysz - acoustic guitar and classical guitar
- Yuri Goloubev - bass
- Asaf Sirkis - drums and percussion

Reviews

Insight received universally favourable reviews. The critic Stephen Graham proclaimed "an album that announces a major new presence on the jazz guitar scene". Peter Bacon in The Jazz Breakfast wrote "Maciek Pysz himself plays both acoustic and classical guitars, though so rich is the recording quality and so varied the sounds he manages to get that you’d swear sometimes there was electricity involved." In London Jazz News, Al Ryan wrote "There is an intuition or shorthand between the musicians that brings together some of the freshest musical ideas and worldwide musical influences to jazz. This CD is a culmination of three years of playing and touring together and the vibe and connection is obvious in the music." And Ian Mann wrote "Pysz's highly melodic writing and well delineated and unhurried playing style make for a highly satisfying and often beautiful album." Jack Massarik in Jazzwise said [this is] "Melodic music played with sensitivity and conviction in a style that borrows more from folk and contemporary classical music than jazz..." Adam Baruch praised the sound quality of the album, stating there is "an astonishing sonic ambience" and awarded the album 4 stars. Marcin Pulawski in Laboratorium Muzycznych Fuzji wrote of the painterly qualities of the music, of the shadows and light, warmth and colour, which give the listener a sense of truth and beauty. He gave the album eight out of ten stars.

== A Journey ==
A Journey was released in October 2015 on Dot Time Records. All tracks are composed by Pysz, except track 6 which was composed by Ralph Towner and track 11 which is jointly composed by Maciek Pysz and Gianluca Corona.

Personnel

- Maciek Pysz - acoustic guitar and classical guitar
- Daniele di Bonaventura - bandoneon and piano
- Yuri Goloubev - bass and piano on track 9
- Asaf Sirkis - drums and percussion

Reviews

A Journey was given 4 stars Recommended by Stephen Graham. "There’s a delicate humanity to the atmosphere throughout, sometimes touching on Pat Metheny territory by cleverly harnessing complex acoustic melodic lines underpinned by a very emotion-laden but uncloying sense of harmony." Ian Mann said "Pysz is a quiet virtuoso who has developed into one of the most distinctive guitarists around." In London Jazz News, Adrian Pallant wrote "the crisp balance of sound and space in this recording is flawless. Throughout, it's great to witness the development of Maciek Pysz's own musical personality." Adam Baruch wrote "There is no doubt that this is an amazing album, full of musical beauty, aesthetic pleasure and extraordinary musicianship, an album that has only a very few equals among the numerous other albums released on a world scale.”

== London Stories ==
London Stories was released in May 2017 on 33 Jazz Records.

Personnel

- Maciek Pysz - classical guitar and acoustic guitar
- Gianluca Corona - classical guitar

Reviews

London Stories was awarded 5 stars by Lance Liddle who wrote "There won't be many if any, better guitar albums either side of the Atlantic this year." *****

== Coming Home ==
Coming Home was released in October 2017 on Caligola Records.

Personnel

- Maciek Pysz - acoustic guitar and electric guitar
- Daniele di Bonaventura - bandoneon and piano

Reviews

Coming Home received good reviews in the UK, Italy and Poland. The London Jazz News reviewer wrote 'Coming Home is a stunningly beautiful album that very nearly got my vote for best of the year. A triumph of understatement and restraint.'

== Discography ==
As leader

- 2026: Pont De Vie (ABeat Records) Maciek Pysz feat. Daniele di Bonaventura & Yuri Goloubev
- 2019: A View (Caligola Records) Maciek Pysz solo guitar
- 2015: A Journey (Dot Time) with Maciek Pysz Quartet feat. Daniele di Bonaventura
- 2013: Insight (33 Jazz) with Maciek Pysz Trio

As co-leader

- 2018: Space Jazz Inwardness (Ozella Music) with Davy Sur and David Amar
- 2017: Coming Home (Caligola Records) duo with Daniele di Bonaventura
- 2017: London Stories (33 Jazz) duo with Gianluca Corona

As sideman or guest

- 2021 Renata Irsa (Soliton) - Czerwona Spodnica
- 2020 Monika Lidke - Let The World Be A Question
- 2020 Julian Costello Quartet (33 Jazz) - Connections
- 2019: David Barrows (Hounds Of Renown Records) - The Species That Knew Too Much
- 2017: Julian Costello Quartet (33 Jazz) - Transitions
- 2017: Monika Lidke (Dot Time) - Gdyby Kazdy Z Nas...
- 2014: Monika Lidke (33 Jazz)/Polskie Radio) – If I Was to Describe You
- 2014: Rom D Collective (La Note Bleue) – Energy in Motion – Live at La Note Bleue
