= MoonJune Records =

Record label

- Founded: 2001
- Founder: Leonardo Pavkovic
- Genre: Progressive rock, avant-garde, ethno jazz, jazz rock
- Country of origin: United States
- Location: New York City, United States / Toledo, Spain
- Official website: moonjune.com

MoonJune Records is an American record label specializing in progressive rock, jazz rock, and avant-garde music. It was founded by record producer Leonardo Pavkovic in 2001.

== History ==
Pavkovic was born in 1962 in Jajce, Yugoslavia and grew up in the region of Apulia, southern Italy. In his youth he was attracted to the music of Black Sabbath, Deep Purple, The Doors, Led Zeppelin, Jimi Hendrix, then the progressive rock of Genesis, Pink Floyd, and Yes, followed by the jazz of Miles Davis, John Coltrane, Sun Ra and blues of John Lee Hooker, Muddy Waters, and John Mayall. He cites as additional influences the concert documentaries Woodstock (1970), Pink Floyd: Live at Pompeii (1972), and The Last Waltz (1978). He avoids any music that could be considered mainstream.

During the 1980s, he discovered ECM Records and from its roster of musicians Keith Jarrett, Jan Garbarek, Egberto Gismonti, Pat Metheny, Terje Rypdal, and Eberhard Weber, and the world music of Paco De Lucia, Ravi Shankar, Milton Nascimento, Astor Piazzola, Fela Kuti.

In college he concentrated on Brazilian and Portuguese literature. He speaks five languages: Bosnian, Italian, English, Brazilian Portuguese, and Spanish. He briefly lived in Africa, in two Portuguese speaking countries Angola and São Tomé & Principe, In 1990 he moved to New York City and worked in graphic design. He started MoonJune Music (booking & management agency) and MoonJune Records (boutique record label) in June 2001.

MoonJune has released albums by Beledo, Dewa Budjana, D.F.A., Dwiki Dharmawan, Michel Delville, Tony Levin, Marbin, Phil Miller, Dennis Rea, Markus Reuter, Asaf Sirkis, Soft Machine, Stick Men, Tohpati, TriPod, and Mark Wingfield. In February 2020, MoonJune Records released its 100th album.
