= That's What You Get Babe =

Studio album by Kevin Ayers
- Released: February 1980
- Recorded: 1980
- Studio: Vineyard (London, UK)
- Genre: Rock
- Length: 32:22
- Label: Harvest
- Producer: Graham Preskett

Kevin Ayers chronology
Rainbow Takeaway (1978)	That's What You Get Babe (1980)	Diamond Jack and the Queen of Pain (1983)

Singles from That's What You Get Babe
- 1. "Money, Money, Money" Released: February 15, 1980

Professional ratings
Review scores
Source	Rating
AllMusic	1.5/5 stars

That's What You Get Babe is the ninth studio album by Kevin Ayers and his final recording for Harvest.

== Background ==
Ayers had retired to Deià, Spain, directly after 1978's Rainbow Takeaway and That's What You Get Babe was his first public appearance in two years. It was arranged and produced by multi-instrumentalist Graham Preskett who had been instructed by Harvest to give the album a more mainstream production, resulting in the offbeat and eccentric presence of Ayers and sidekick Ollie Halsall sounding rather absent from the proceedings.

Although the polished arrangements of the LP met with some hostile responses from fans and critics on release in 1980, it has been reassessed and noted to contain a strong selection of Ayers compositions. The production dichotomy perhaps best exemplified in the lyrics of the title song: "That's what you get for following dreams / Never turn out how they should it seems / That what you get for losing yourself / That's what you get, babe."

"Money Money Money" was released as a single in the UK backed with "Stranger in Blue Suede Shoes" and Ayers performed shows in New York and London to promote the LP. However, he quickly withdrew to more sympathetic audiences in France and Spain, in the latter of which he released a single of non-LP tracks, "Animals"/"Don't Fall in Love With Me" on Columbia Records.

It would be three and a half years before Ayers would release his next album, Diamond Jack and the Queen of Pain, in June 1983.

== Track listing ==
All tracks composed by Kevin Ayers

1. "That's What You Get" – 3:16
2. "Where Do I Go From Here" – 2:39
3. "You Never Outrun Your Heart" – 3:06
4. "Given and Taken" – 2:54
5. "Idiots" – 3:07
6. "Super Salesman" – 5:03
7. "Money Money Money" – 3:12
8. "Miss Hanaga" – 3:18
9. "I'm So Tired" – 2:36
10. "Where Do The Stars End" – 3:03

== Personnel ==
=== Musicians ===
- Kevin Ayers – guitar, vocals
- Graham Preskett – guitar, violin, keyboards, backing vocals, banjo, mandolin
- Ollie Halsall – guitar (tracks 1–3, 5–10) bass (track 7), slide guitar (tracks 5, 10), backing vocals
- Mo Foster – bass (tracks 1–6, 9–10)
- Liam Genockey – drums (tracks 1–6, 9–10)

=== Additional musicians ===
- Roy Jones – percussion (tracks 1–2, 6, 8)
- Neil Lancaster – backing vocals (tracks 1, 3, 7–8, 10)
- Clare Torry – backing vocals (tracks 1, 3, 7–8, 10)
- Trevor Murrell – drums (track 8), percussion (tracks 3, 10)
- Geoff Whitehorn – lead guitar (track 2)

=== Technical ===
- Graham Preskett – producer
- Simaen Skolfield – engineer
- Edwin Cross, Laurie Latham, Rick Walton – assistant engineers
- Roger Dopson – liner notes

== References and Sources ==
- Original LP sleevenotes
