= Falling in Love Again (Can't Help It) =

1930 song by Friedrich Hollaender

- A-side label of US 78-rpm single

Single by Marlene Dietrich
- B-side: "Naughty Lola"
- Released: 1930
- Genre: Traditional pop
- Label: Victor Talking Machine Company
- Songwriters: Friedrich Hollaender (German); Sammy Lerner (English)

"Falling in Love Again (Can't Help It)" is the English language name for a 1930 German song composed by Friedrich Hollaender as "Ich bin von Kopf bis Fuß auf Liebe eingestellt" (literally: "I am, from head to toe, ready for love"). The song was originally performed in the 1930 film Der Blaue Engel (English translation: The Blue Angel) by Marlene Dietrich, who also recorded the more famous English version, which became her anthem. Dietrich is backed by the Friedrich Hollaender Orchestra.

The English lyrics were written by Sammy Lerner, though they do not include a translation of the original version's most erotic verse; when the English version is sung, the first verse is simply repeated. The song is sometimes co-credited to Reginald Connelly.

== Cover versions ==
=== The Beatles version ===
"Falling in Love Again" was covered live by the Beatles while playing Hamburg in 1962. The band altered the English lyrics slightly, and delivered the song in a rock'n'roll style.

Featuring Paul McCartney on lead vocals, the Beatles' live rendition of the song can be found on the double LP Live! at the Star-Club in Hamburg, Germany; 1962, originally released in 1977; it is the only released version of the song by the band.

=== Kevin Ayers version ===
"Falling in Love Again"

Single by Kevin Ayers

from the album Yes We Have No Mañanas (So Get Your Mañanas Today)
- B-side: "Everyone Knows the Song"
- Released: February 1976
- Genre: Rock
- Label: Island WIP6271 & Harvest
- Producer: Muff Winwood

Kevin Ayers singles chronology
"After the Show" (1974)	"Falling in Love Again" (1976)	"Star" (1977)

Harvest single cover
- Harvest edition

"Falling in Love Again" was Kevin Ayers' final release on Island Records. The flip side, "Everyone Knows the Song", was an Ayers original. After the release of this single, Ayers signed to Harvest Records, and both tracks became part of his 1976 album Yes We Have No Mañanas (So Get Your Mañanas Today). The single was also re-released a few months later by Harvest in parts of Europe but featuring the Ayers original "The Owl" on the B-side.

==== Track listing ====
Island release

1. "Falling in Love Again" (Hollander/Connelly)
2. "Everyone Knows the Song" (Kevin Ayers)

Harvest release

1. "Falling in Love Again" (Hollander/Connelly)
2. "The Owl" (Kevin Ayers)

==== Personnel ====
- Kevin Ayers – vocals
- Billy Livsey – keyboards
- Charlie McCracken – bass
- Ollie Halsall – guitar
- Rob Townsend – drums
- Roger Saunders – guitar
- B. J. Cole – steel guitar
- Pip Williams (arr. A-side)

=== Adicts version ===
"Falling in Love Again"

Single by the Adicts
- Released: May 1985
- Genre: Punk rock, new wave
- Label: Sire

The Adicts singles chronology
"Tokyo" (1984)	"Falling in Love Again" (1985)

The 12-inch single "Falling in Love Again" by the Adicts was released in 1985 under the name ADX. It is often included as a bonus track on reissues of the punk band's third album, Smart Alex.

==== Track listing ====
1. "Falling in Love Again"
2. "Come Along"
3. "It's a Laugh"
4. "Saturday Night"

==== Personnel ====
- Keith "Monkey" Warren – vocals
- Mel "Spider" Ellis – bass
- Pete "Pete Dee" Davison – guitar
- Michael "Kid Dee" Davison – drums
- John "Scruff" Ellis – guitar
- Dan "Fiddle Dan" Graziani – violin, piano, mandolin

== Other versions ==
Dietrich re-recorded the song in a huskier voice in 1939, accompanied by Victor Young and His Orchestra. As her signature song, it would also consistently be featured on Dietrich's live albums.

Doris Day - Duet with André Previn (1962)

Alan Price, who had recently left the Animals, released a 45-rpm single on Deram Records in 1969.

Linda Ronstadt recorded the song with Nelson Riddle and his orchestra; it appears on her 1984 pop album Lush Life.

Christina Aguilera recorded the song for the soundtrack of The Spirit, a 2008 movie adaptation of the comic book series.

John Prine covered the song with Alison Krauss on his 2016 album of duets For Better, or Worse.

The song was also recorded and featured on releases by the Comedian Harmonists (in German, as "Wir sind von Kopf bis Fuß auf Liebe eingestellt", circa 1930); Zarah Leander (1931, in Swedish); Billie Holiday (1940); Sammy Davis Jr. (1962); Nina Simone (1966); Claudine Longet (1968); Lill Lindfors (1968, new Swedish lyrics); Denise McCann (1979); Techno Twins (1981); Klaus Nomi (1982); Family Fodder (1983); William S. Burroughs (1990, in German); Ute Lemper, in German and English, on her 1992 Illusions album; Marianne Faithfull (1997); Bryan Ferry (1999); the Puppini Sisters (2006); and Theo Bleckmann (2008); Patricia Kaas (2008, on the album Kabaret); and by Alain Kan (in English).

The 1974 Mel Brooks film Blazing Saddles features a performance by Madeline Kahn of a song called "I'm Tired", a parody of Dietrich's performance of the Hollaender song in The Blue Angel. The song lyrics are parodied in an original Star Trek novel, How Much for Just the Planet? (1987) by John M. Ford. "Falling in Love Again" was also sung by Guy Siner (as Lieutenant Gruber) in an episode of the sitcom 'Allo 'Allo!

Madonna sang a few lines of the song during The Girlie Show Tour in 1993. It also was featured on the Bonzo Dog Doo Dah Band's 40th anniversary tour in 2006.
