= Money Money Money (Kevin Ayers song) =

Single by Kevin Ayers

from the album That's What You Get Babe
- B-side: "Stranger In Blue Suede Shoes"
- Released: Feb 1980
- Genre: Rock
- Label: Harvest
- Songwriter: Kevin Ayers
- Producer: Graham Preskett

Kevin Ayers single singles chronology
"Mr. Cool" (1977)	"Money Money Money" (1980)	"Animals" (1980)

"Money Money Money" was a Kevin Ayers single issued to promote his 1980 album, That's What You Get Babe. By this time fiscal realities were obviously shadowing the naiveté of his psychedelic youth as he ruefully notes; “You get moonlight in the evening / Sunshine by day / That's all you get for nothing / You want more?” The B-side is his 1971 single ‘Stranger in Blue Suede Shoes’.

== Track listing ==
1. "Money Money Money" (Kevin Ayers)
2. "Stranger In Blue Suede Shoes" (Kevin Ayers)

== Personnel ==
- Kevin Ayers / Guitar, Vocals
- Liam Genockey / Drums
- Ollie Halsall / Bass
- Neil Lancaster / Vocals
- Graham Preskett / Acoustic Guitar, Banjo, Brass Synth, Piano, Violin, Electric Piano, Mandolin, Vocals
- Clare Torry / Vocals
