= Joy of a Toy (song) =

- 1968 US issue

Single by The Soft Machine

from the album The Soft Machine
- B-side: "Why Are We Sleeping?"
- Released: November 1968
- Recorded: April 1968
- Studio: Record Plant, New York City
- Genre: Canterbury scene; psychedelic rock
- Length: 2:40
- Label: Probe
- Songwriters: Kevin Ayers; Mike Ratledge
- Producers: Chas Chandler; Tom Wilson

The Soft Machine singles chronology
"Love Makes Sweet Music" (1967)	"Joy of a Toy" (1968)	"Soft Space" (1978)

"Joy of a Toy" was the first US single by the psychedelic rock band Soft Machine. It was released in 1968 to promote the group's debut album The Soft Machine. The single features edited versions of two songs, both being the only known mono mixes from that album. Kevin Ayers would employ the song's title for his debut solo album, Joy of a Toy, a year later, even though it does not feature the song. According to Rob Chapman, the title of the A-side was taken from the name of an otherwise unrelated composition by Ornette Coleman.

== Track listing ==
1. "Joy of a Toy" (Ayers/Ratledge)
2. "Why Are We Sleeping?" (Ayers/Ratledge/Wyatt)

== Personnel ==
- Kevin Ayers – bass guitar
- Mike Ratledge – keyboards
- Robert Wyatt – drums
