= The Soft Machine (Soft Machine album) =

- US cover

Studio album by The Soft Machine
- Released: December 1968
- Recorded: April 1968 at Record Plant Studios, New York City
- Genres: Canterbury scene; psychedelic rock; jazz rock
- Length: 41:30
- Labels: USA: ABC Probe CPLP 4500; France: Barclay
- Producers: Chas Chandler, Tom Wilson

The Soft Machine chronology
The Soft Machine (1968)	Volume Two (1969)

Singles from The Soft Machine
- 1. "Joy of a Toy" b/w "Why Are We Sleeping?" Released: November 1968

The Soft Machine (also titled Volume One as a reissue) is the debut album by the British psychedelic rock band Soft Machine, released in December 1968, through ABC Records and Probe Records in the United States and Barclay in France. The album, a psychedelic rock and jazz rock record, was recorded in April 1968 at Record Plant Studios, based in New York City, and was produced by Chas Chandler of The Animals and Tom Wilson.

Upon its release, the album charted at number 160 on the Billboard Top LPs chart in the US, and peaked at number 49 on the RPM Top Albums chart in Canada. The album's sole single, "Joy of a Toy"/"Why Are We Sleeping?", was released in November 1968. The album was later reissued with their debut single, "Love Makes Sweet Music"/"Feelin' Reelin' Squeelin'", in 2009. It is the group's only album to feature Kevin Ayers as a member, as he would leave the group that same year.

== Background and recording ==
Founded in 1966 by keyboardist Mike Ratledge, drummer/vocalist Robert Wyatt, bassist/vocalist Kevin Ayers and guitarists Daevid Allen and Larry Nowlin, Soft Machine were one of the central bands in the Canterbury scene and had been staples of the London underground, playing the UFO Club with Pink Floyd. After their first single, February 1967's "Love Makes Sweet Music", failed to chart, they put future releases on hold while they continued to tour. Eventually, they recorded this self-titled debut album in New York City during a spring 1968 tour of the United States with The Jimi Hendrix Experience, produced by Chas Chandler and Tom Wilson.

By the time it was recorded, the band had been reduced to a three-piece, with Nowlin leaving in September 1966 and Allen having left in August 1967, going on to form the band Gong. After the album was completed, future Police guitarist Andy Summers joined the band; he left after just two months, returning them to a three-piece until Ayers himself left that September, effectively ending The Soft Machine until its reformation at the end of the year.

== Music ==
The work on this album was one of the essential roots in progressive rock and jazz-fusion. Two of the tracks, "Save Yourself" and "So Boot If At All" (under its original title and lyric "I Should've Known") stem from a series of April 1967 demos cut with Daevid Allen. With Allen's departure, Mike Ratledge took over the group's solos on a Lowrey organ, attempting to beef up its sound with a fuzz box and Wah-wah pedal at the suggestion of Hendrix. Musically, the album is a transitional release between more concise, conventional pop music with avant-garde electronics and free-form jazz improvisations, using a scaled-down, keyboard-led trio format similar to The Nice.

== Artwork ==
The original artwork featured a circular die-cut sleeve, revealing a rotating wheel card insert with gears through which the band members could be viewed underneath (a similar gimmick would later be tried for Led Zeppelin III). The original issue’s gatefold and back sleeve also featured the uncensored image of a nude girl's backside.

== Reception and legacy ==
Professional ratings
Review scores
Source	Rating
AllMusic	4.5/5 stars

The album initially saw release only in the United States, Canada and France, where it made little impact. In the United States, the album charted at number 160 on the Billboard Top LPs chart. In Canada, the album charted at number 49 on the RPM Top Albums chart. Retrospective critical appraisals have been largely positive, with AllMusic stating that "it was one of the few over-ambitious records of the psychedelic era that actually delivered on all its incredible promise".

== Track listing ==
Side one
No.	Title	Writer(s)	Length
1.	"Hope for Happiness"	Kevin Ayers; Mike Ratledge; Brian Hopper	4:21
2.	"Joy of a Toy"	Ayers; Ratledge	2:49
3.	"Hope for Happiness (Reprise)"	Ayers; Ratledge; B. Hopper	1:38
4.	"Why Am I So Short?"	Ratledge; Ayers; Hugh Hopper	1:39
5.	"So Boot If At All"	Ayers; Ratledge; Robert Wyatt	7:25
6.	"A Certain Kind"	H. Hopper	4:11

Side two
No.	Title	Writer(s)	Length
7.	"Save Yourself"	Wyatt	2:26
8.	"Priscilla"	Ayers; Ratledge; Wyatt	1:03
9.	"Lullabye Letter"	Ayers	4:32
10.	"We Did It Again"	Ayers	3:46
11.	"Plus Belle qu'une Poubelle"	Ayers	1:03
12.	"Why Are We Sleeping?"	Ayers; Ratledge; Wyatt	5:30
13.	"Box 25/4 Lid"	Ratledge; H. Hopper	0:49

=== Notes ===
The 2009 Remastered Edition includes "Love Makes Sweet Music" and "Feelin' Reelin' Squeelin'" as bonus tracks. The songs were respectively Side A and Side B of their first single, issued in 1967.

== Personnel ==
Soft Machine

- Mike Ratledge – organ
- Kevin Ayers – lead guitar, bass, lead vocals (on 10), spoken word (on 12)
- Robert Wyatt – drums, lead vocals

Additional personnel

- Hugh Hopper – fuzz bass (on 13)
- The Cake – backing vocals (on 12)

== Charts ==
Chart (1969)	Peak position
US Billboard Top LPs	160
Canada RPM Top Albums	49
