= Who's Still Crazy =

"Who’s Still Crazy"

Single by Kevin Ayers

from the album Diamond Jack and the Queen of Pain
- B-side: "Champagne and Valium"
- Released: 1983
- Genre: Rock
- Label: WEA (ES)
- Songwriter(s): Kevin Ayers
- Producer(s): Juan Ruiz

Kevin Ayers single singles chronology
| "My Speeding Heart" (1983) | "Who’s Still Crazy" (1983) | "Stop Playing with My Heart" (1984) |

"Who’s Still Crazy" is a Kevin Ayers Spanish single release taken from his 1983 album, Diamond Jack and the Queen of Pain. It is backed with his autobiographical ‘Champagne and Valium’, also lifted from the same LP.

== Track listing ==
1. "Who's Still Crazy" (Kevin Ayers)
2. "Champagne and Valium" (Kevin Ayers)

== Personnel ==
- Kevin Ayers / Guitar, Vocals
- Ollie Halsall / Guitar, Vocals
- Zanna Gregmar
- Carlos Garcia Vaso
- Joaquin Montoya
- Manolo Aguilar
- Javier de Juan
