= Caribbean Moon =

Single by Kevin Ayers
- B-side: "Take Me To Tahiti"
- Released: Apr, 1973
- Genre: Rock
- Length: 2:54
- Label: Harvest, Sire (USA)
- Songwriter(s): Kevin Ayers
- Producer(s): Kevin Ayers

Kevin Ayers singles chronology
"Oh! Wot a Dream" (1972)	"Caribbean Moon" (1973)	"The Up Song" (1974)

Sire USA single
- Sire edition

"Caribbean Moon" (backed with "Take Me To Tahiti") was a Kevin Ayers single, released shortly before his third LP Bananamour. Neither song was featured on the LP but both regularly appeared in his live set at the time. A humorous promotional video was shot for the single; stills from which are featured on the cover.

== Track listing ==
1. "Caribbean Moon " (Kevin Ayers)
2. "Take Me To Tahiti" (Kevin Ayers)

== Personnel ==
- Kevin Ayers / Guitar, Vocals, Bass
- Archie Leggett / Bass, Harmony Vocals
- Eddie Sparrow / Drums
- Keith Bachelor / Flute
- Harry Smith / Piccolo
- Roy Smith-Field / Piccolo
- Schokomomoko / Inspiration of the album
