= Lady June =

English poet, painter and singer (1931–1999)

Background information
- Also known as: June 'Onion'
- Born: June Campbell Cramer; 3 June 1931; Doncaster, West Riding of Yorkshire, England
- Died: 7 June 1999 (aged 68) Deià, Majorca, Spain
- Genre: Progressive rock
- Occupations: Poet, painter, singer
- Instrument: Vocals
- Years active: early 1960s – 1999
- Label: Caroline
- Formerly of: Gong

June Campbell Cramer (3 June 1931 – 7 June 1999), better known as Lady June, was an English painter, poet and musician. She was associated with the Canterbury scene and recorded two albums. She exhibited and performed her works in several countries, often combining her painting, poetry and music into multimedia presentations.

Richie Unterberger at AllMusic described her as a "Bohemian artist", and an obituary in The Independent called her "a great British eccentric and cosmic prankster".

== Biography ==
June Campbell Cramer was born on 3 June 1931 in Doncaster in Yorkshire, England. Her parents were Scottish and Russian, and she was brought up in Plymouth according to the strict rules of the Plymouth Brethren, a conservative Evangelical Christian movement. In the late 1940s, her father, a fashion retailer, took her to the Spanish island of Majorca, where he introduced her to modelling. June moved to London in the 1950s where she worked as a model and studied at an art college. In the early 1960s she returned to Majorca, where she continued modelling in Palma.

In Palma June met several musicians including Daevid Allen and Kevin Ayers, who later became associated with the Canterbury scene and were founding members of the Canterbury bands Gong and Soft Machine. June later moved to the coastal village of Deià on Majorca, home of the English poet Robert Graves. Allen said that to live there "you had to have some sort of satisfactory relationship with him ... Robert was very tolerant of June, and she hung out with him." June began painting in Deià and put on several exhibitions of her work there as June 'Onion', hanging an onion over each piece as her signature. Her paintings, and later her poetry, were filled with elements of "surreal humour".

In the late 1960s June moved into a flat in Vale Court in Maida Vale, London, which she opened up to many musicians to lodge in or just "hang out". Allen described her flat as "London's premier smoking salon", and her role of "landlady to many of the capital's more creative musicians" spawned her honorary title of "Lady". She hosted many parties there, including a birthday party in June 1973 for Gilli Smyth, Allen's wife, during which ex-Soft Machine drummer Robert Wyatt broke his back when he fell from a fourth-floor window.

By 1970 June was combining her painting, poetry and music into multimedia presentations, and in 1972 she gave performances at a number of venues, including the International Carnival of Experimental Sound in London and the Edinburgh Festival. In 1973 she worked on the BBC Radio 4 series If It's Wednesday It Must Be... with Kenny Everett and Vivian Stanshall, and participated in a Radiophone Workshop for BBC Radio 3. Later that year she recorded Lady June's Linguistic Leprosy, an album of her poetry to music by Ayers, one of her tenants, and Brian Eno, who lived nearby. The recording was made in the front room of her flat in Vale Court with Ayers, Eno and Pip Pyle, and reportedly cost £400. Richie Unterberger at AllMusic called the album "an eccentric piece of work" with songs that are "odd, whimsical, rather surrealistic spoken poems, delivered in a quirkily aristocratic manner".

June continued performing solo and with other artists, and appeared at several women's festivals in Amsterdam and London. In 1975 she moved back to Deià, where she lived in the artists' commune, and it was here that she was most productive. Ayers said, "I think she found what she was looking for ... She had been involved in fashion and didn't really like it. She had a longing to be an artist – at whatever cost – and discovered that in Deià." June maintained contact with the Canterbury scene musicians and groups, and she featured in a Gong concert held in Paris in May 1977. June overcame her shyness by drinking and taking soft drugs, but often tended to over-indulge. Cream lyricist Pete Brown said, "She smoked and drank a bit too much ... but her paintings continued to be terrific and so funny." In the mid-1990s June suffered a minor stroke, but this did not deter her work and she continued exhibiting her paintings and giving poetry performances in Deià.

In 1996 June released her second record, Hit and Myth, and was working on a third, Rebela, an autobiography/audiobiography with Mark Hewins, featuring some of the members of Gong, Pete Brown, Lol Coxhill and others, when she died of a heart attack in Deià on 7 June 1999. An obituary in The Independent called Lady June "a great British eccentric and cosmic prankster", and said that her "most achieved performance was herself: she succeeded in turning her existence into living art, bristling with humour."

== Discography ==
- Lady June's Linguistic Leprosy (1974, LP, Caroline Records)
- Lady June's Hit and Myth (1996, CD, Gas Records)

Source: AllMusic
