= Kevin Ayers =

English singer-songwriter (1944–2013)

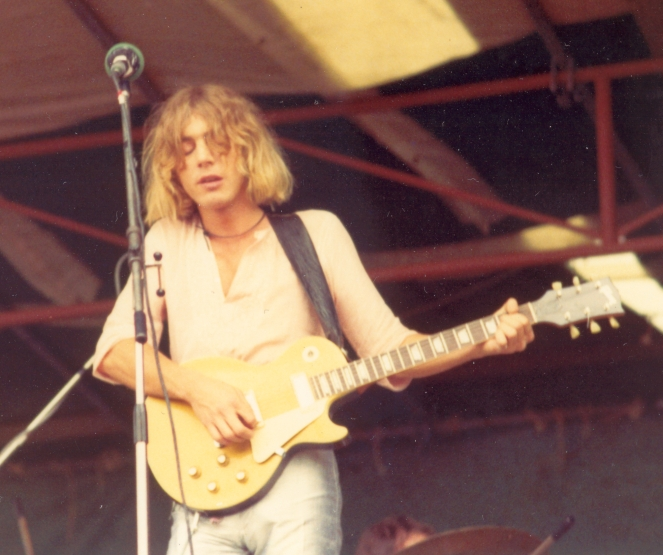
- Free concert at Hyde Park, 29 June 1974

Background information
- Born: 16 August 1944; Herne Bay, Kent, England
- Died: 18 February 2013 (aged 68) Montolieu, France
- Genres: Canterbury scene; psychedelia; progressive rock; progressive pop
- Occupations: Musician; singer-songwriter; record producer
- Instruments: Vocals; guitar; bass guitar
- Years active: 1960s–2013
- Labels: LO-MAX; Island; Harvest; Sire; ABC
- Formerly of: Soft Machine

Kevin Ayers (16 August 1944 – 18 February 2013) was an English singer-songwriter who was active in the English psychedelic music movement. Ayers was a founding member of the psychedelic band Soft Machine in the mid-1960s, and was closely associated with the Canterbury scene. He recorded a series of albums as a solo artist and over the years worked with Brian Eno, Syd Barrett, Bridget St John, John Cale, Elton John, Robert Wyatt, Andy Summers, Mike Oldfield, Nico and Ollie Halsall, among others. After living for many years in Deià, Mallorca, he returned to the United Kingdom in the mid-1990s before moving to the south of France. His last album, The Unfairground, was released in 2007. The British rock journalist Nick Kent wrote: "Kevin Ayers and Syd Barrett were the two most important people in British pop music. Everything that came after came from them."

== Biography ==
=== Early life ===
Ayers was born in Herne Bay, Kent, the son of BBC producer Rowan Ayers. Following his parents' divorce and his mother's subsequent marriage to a British civil servant, Ayers spent most of his childhood in Malaya. Ayers returned to England at the age of 12, and attended Simon Langton Grammar School for Boys in Canterbury. In his early college years he became involved with the emerging Canterbury scene when he joined the Wilde Flowers, a band that included Robert Wyatt and Hugh Hopper, as well as future members of Caravan. This prompted him to start writing songs and singing.

=== Soft Machine ===
Ayers and Wyatt left the Wilde Flowers, later joining keyboardist Mike Ratledge and guitarist Daevid Allen to form Soft Machine. Ayers switched to bass (and later both guitar and bass following Allen's departure from that group) and shared vocals with the drummer, Robert Wyatt. The group's sound contrasted between Ayers's baritone and Wyatt's tenor singing, plus a mix of rock and jazz. The band often shared stages (particularly at the UFO Club) with Pink Floyd. They released their debut single "Love Makes Sweet Music" / "Feelin' Reelin' Squeelin" in February 1967, making it one of the first recordings from the new British psychedelic movement. Their debut album, The Soft Machine, was recorded in the US for ABC/Probe and released in 1968. It is considered a classic of the genre.

=== Solo career, 1969–2013 ===
==== 1970–1976 ====
After an extensive tour of the United States opening for the Jimi Hendrix Experience, a weary Ayers sold his white Fender Jazz Bass to Noel Redding and retreated to the beaches of Ibiza in Spain with Daevid Allen to recuperate. While there, Ayers went on a songwriting binge that resulted in the songs that would make up his first album, Joy of a Toy. The album was one of the first released on the new Harvest label, alongside Pink Floyd's Ummagumma. Joy of a Toy established Ayers as a unique talent with music that varied from the circus march of the title cut, to the pastoral "Girl on a Swing", and the ominous "Oleh Oleh Bandu Bandong", based on a Malay folksong. Ayers's colleagues from Soft Machine backed him on one track, "Song for Insane Times", and on some cuts with Rob Tait, sometime Gong drummer.

One product of the sessions was the single, "Religious Experience (Singing a Song in the Morning)", early recordings of which featured Syd Barrett on guitar and backing vocals. The lead guitar that appears on the final mix was often thought to have been played by Barrett, even appearing on various Barrett bootlegs, but Ayers said that he played the solo, emulating Barrett's style. However, the 2004 CD reissue of Joy of a Toy includes a mix of this song featuring Barrett's guitar as a bonus track.

Ayers was to all intents and purposes a member of Gong in 1971 when the band first toured the UK. He also played an instrumental role in Steve Hillage appearing in Gong in 1972, while Steve was touring France as a member of Ayers's band.

A second album, Shooting at the Moon, soon followed. For this, Ayers assembled a band that he called the Whole World, including a young Mike Oldfield on bass and occasionally lead guitar, avant-garde composer David Bedford on keyboards and improvising saxophonist, Lol Coxhill. Again Ayers came up with a batch of engaging songs interspersed with avant-garde instrumentals and a heavy dose of whimsy.

The Whole World was reportedly an erratic band live, and Ayers was not cut out for life on the road touring. The band broke up after a short tour, with no hard feelings, as most of the musicians guested on Ayers's next album, Whatevershebringswesing, which is regarded as one of his best, featuring the mellifluous eight-minute title track that would become Ayers's signature sound for the 1970s.

Bananamour was the fourth studio album by Kevin Ayers and it featured some of his most accessible recordings, including "Shouting in a Bucket Blues" and his whimsical tribute to Syd Barrett, "Oh! Wot A Dream". After Whatevershebringswesing, Ayers assembled a new band anchored by drummer Eddie Sparrow and bassist Archie Legget and employed a more direct lyricism. The centrepiece of the album is "Decadence", a portrait of Nico.

1974 was a watershed year for Ayers. In addition to releasing his most compelling music in this year, he helped provide other artists with access to a wider stage, most notably Lady June (June Campbell Cramer). The recording, titled Lady June's Linguistic Leprosy, made in a front room of Cramer's home in Vale Court, Maida Vale, brought Lady June's spoken-word poetry together with the music and voice of Ayers, and also had contributions by Brian Eno and Pip Pyle. It was originally released on Ayers's own Banana Productions label (via Virgin/Caroline).

The Confessions of Dr. Dream and Other Stories marked Ayers's move to the more commercial Island record label and is considered by many to be the most cohesive example of Ayersian philosophy. The production was expensive, with Ayers quoting the recording costs in a 1974 NME interview as exceeding £32,000 (a vast figure at the time). On this LP Mike Oldfield returned to the fold, and guitarist Ollie Halsall from progressive rock band Patto began a twenty-year partnership with Ayers.

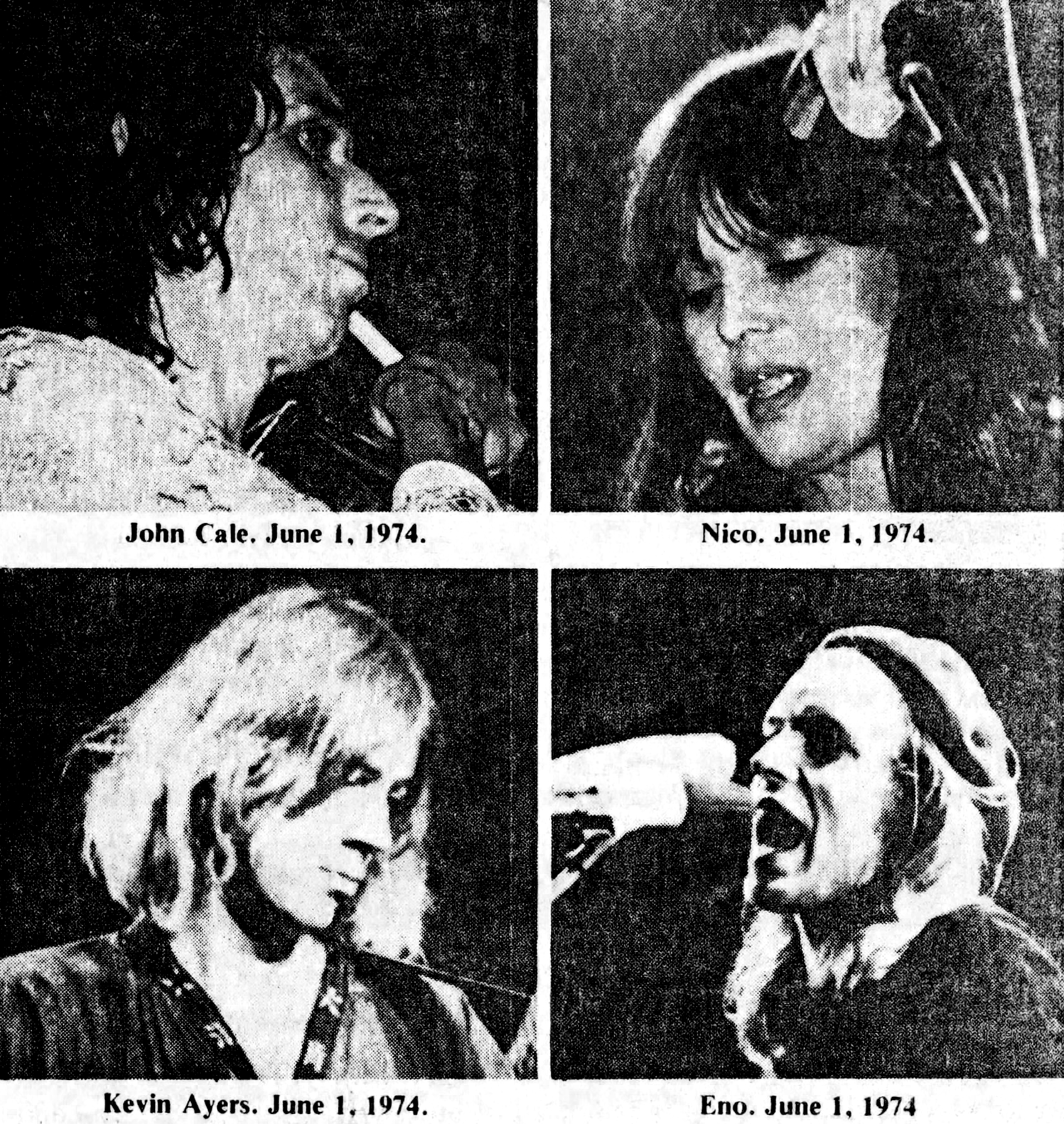
A collage of John Cale, Nico, Ayers, and Brian Eno performing at London's Rainbow Theatre on 1 June 1974.

On 1 June 1974, Ayers headlined a heavily publicised concert at the Rainbow Theatre, London, accompanied by John Cale, Nico, Brian Eno and Mike Oldfield. The performance was released by Island Records just 27 days later on a live LP entitled June 1, 1974. Tensions were somewhat fraught at the event since the night before John Cale had caught Ayers sleeping with his wife, prompting him to write the bile-soaked paean "Guts" that appeared on his 1975 album Slow Dazzle.

In 1976, Ayers returned to his original label Harvest and released Yes We Have No Mañanas (So Get Your Mañanas Today). The album was a more commercial affair. and secured Ayers a new American contract with ABC Records. The LP featured contributions from B.J. Cole and Zoot Money. That same year Harvest released a collection entitled Odd Ditties, that assembled a colourful group of songs that Ayers had consigned to single B-Sides or left unreleased.

==== The european years (1978–1992) ====
The late 1970s and 1980s saw Ayers as a self-imposed exile in warmer climes (Spain), a fugitive from changing musical fashions, and a hostage to chemical addictions. Rainbow Takeaway was released in 1978 and That's What You Get Babe in 1980. 1983's Diamond Jack and the Queen of Pain, Ayers's 10th solo album, was perhaps a low-point for Ayers. He was quoted in a 1992 BBC Radio 1 interview as saying he had "virtually no recollection of making those records", and that living in Deià was "a very bad move on my part. The social scene was very intense, a meat market of expatriates all flaunting themselves and on display. My career was going downhill". Ayers released two more solo albums, 1984's Deià...Vu and 1986's As Close As You Think to little attention. The road back was marked with 1988's prophetically titled Falling Up, which received his first positive press notices in years. In 1987 he also recorded a vocal track for Mike Oldfield's single, "Flying Start". The lyrics of this song contains many references to Ayers's life.

Despite the positive reception Falling Up received, Ayers by this point had almost completely withdrawn from any public stage. An acoustic album Still Life with Guitar recorded with Fairground Attraction surfaced in France on the FNAC label and was subsequently released throughout Europe. After a European Tour in April/May 1992 his musical partner Ollie Halsall suddenly died of a drugs-related heart attack. Collaborations with Ayers fanatics Ultramarine and with Liverpool's Wizards of Twiddly completed his output in the 1990s. The Wizards of Twiddly collaboration encompassed a couple of concert tours of the U.K./ Europe during 1995 and a resulting live album, 'Turn the Lights Down' [Market Square Records, 1999].

In 1993, Ayers toured the USA twice, usually performing solo with occasional guests, including Daevid Allen, who was also touring at the same time. Aside from a few New York shows in 1980 with Ollie Halsall, these tours were Ayers's first live performances in the US since 1968. In 1998 and 2000 he returned for two California mini-tours, performing in Los Angeles and San Francisco and backed by local musicians. The 2000 concerts had Ayers double-billed with Gong. Longtime friend John Altman joined the Los Angeles band in 2000.

BBC DJ John Peel wrote in his autobiography: "Kevin Ayers' talent is so acute you could perform major eye surgery with it."

==== Later years (2000–2013) ====
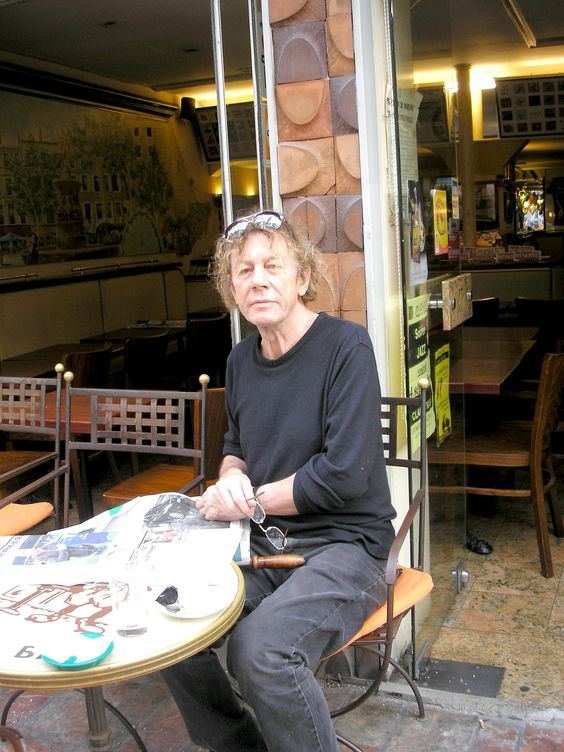
Ayers in Carcassonne, September 2009

In the late 1990s, Ayers was living the life of a recluse in the south of France. At the Sculpture Centre he met American artist Timothy Shepard, who had been invited to use studio space there, and the two became friends. Ayers started to show up at Shepard's house with a guitar, and by 2005 passed some new recordings on to Shepard, most taped on a cassette recorder at his kitchen table. The songs were by turns "poignant, insightful and honest", and Shepard, "deeply moved" by what he heard, encouraged Ayers to record them properly for a possible new album.

Signing with London's LO-MAX Records, Shepard found equal enthusiasm for the demos and after making some tentative enquiries, discovered a hotbed of interest in Ayers's work amongst the current generation of musicians. New York's Ladybug Transistor set up rehearsals for a possible recording organised by band leader Gary Olson, and Kevin and Shepard flew out to New York. When the rehearsals gelled, the entourage, which had now swelled to include horn and string players, flew out to Tucson, Arizona, where the first sessions were recorded in a dusty hangar known as Wavelab Studios.

With the tapes from the first sessions, Shepard set about getting Ayers to complete the album in the UK, where by now word had spread, and a host of musicians started gravitating to the studio. Shepard recounted meeting Teenage Fanclub at a Go-Betweens party and hearing their passion for Ayers's music, and wrote a letter to singer, guitarist Norman Blake. Mojo magazine reported that, within a couple of weeks, Ayers was in a Glasgow studio with Teenage Fanclub and a host of their like-minded colleagues, who had all assembled to work with their hero. Bill Wells from the Bill Wells Trio rubbed shoulders with Euros Childs from Gorky's Zygotic Mynci and Francis Reader from the Trash Can Sinatras.

Friends and peers from the past also visited the sessions. Robert Wyatt provided his eerie Wyattron in the poignant "Cold Shoulder", Phil Manzanera contributed to the brooding "Brainstorm", Hugh Hopper from Soft Machine played bass on the title track and Bridget St John, a British folk singer beloved of John Peel, duetted with Ayers on "Baby Come Home", the first time they had sung together since 1970 on Shooting at the Moon. The Unfairground was released to critical acclaim in September 2007.

Ayers died in his sleep on 18 February 2013 in Montolieu, France, aged 68. He was survived by three daughters, Rachel, Galen and Annaliese, and his sister, Kate. Rachel and Galen are also active as singers and musicians.

== Discography ==
=== Soft Machine ===
Title	Label	Date of Release
The Soft Machine	ABC/Probe	December 1968

=== Solo ===
Title	Label	Date of Release
Joy of a Toy	Harvest	November 1969
Shooting at the Moon (credited to Kevin Ayers and the Whole World)	Harvest	October 1970
Whatevershebringswesing	Harvest	November 1971
Bananamour	Harvest	May 1973
The Confessions of Dr. Dream and Other Stories	Island	May 1974
Sweet Deceiver	Island	March 1975
Yes We Have No Mañanas (So Get Your Mañanas Today)	Harvest	June 1976
Rainbow Takeaway	Harvest	April 1978
That's What You Get Babe	Harvest	February 1980
Diamond Jack and the Queen of Pain	Charly	June 1983
Deià...Vu	Blau	March 1984
As Close as You Think	Illuminated	June 1986
Falling Up	Virgin	February 1988
Still Life with Guitar	FNAC	January 1992
The Unfairground	LO-MAX	September 2007

=== Singles ===
Title	Label	Date of Release
"Love Makes Sweet Music" (with Soft Machine)	Polydor	February 1967
"Joy of a Toy" (with Soft Machine)	ABC/Probe (USA)	November 1968
"Singing a Song in the Morning"	Harvest	February 1970
"Butterfly Dance"	Harvest	October 1970
"Stranger in Blue Suede Shoes"	Harvest	August 1971
"Oh! Wot a Dream"	Harvest	November 1972
"Don't Let It Get You Down"	Harvest (FR)	November 1972
"Caribbean Moon"	Harvest	April 1973
"The Up Song"	Island	February 1974
"Day by Day"	Island (NL)	February 1974
"After The Show"	Island	July 1974
"Falling in Love Again"	Island	February 1976
"Stranger in Blue Suede Shoes" (reissue)	Harvest	February 1976
"Star"	Harvest	April 1977
"Mr. Cool"	ABC (USA)	April 1977
"Money Money Money"	Harvest	February 1980
"Animals"	Columbia (ES)	1980
"My Speeding Heart"	Charly	1983
"Who's Still Crazy"	WEA (ES)	1983
"Stop Playing with My Heart"	Blau (ES)	1984
"Stepping Out"	Illuminated	1986
"Am I Really Marcel?"	Accidentales (ES)	1988
"The Best We Have"	Accidentales (ES)	1988
"Thank You Very Much"	FNAC	1992
"Baby Come Home"	LO-MAX	September 2008

=== Compilations, collaborations and live recordings ===
- June 1, 1974 (Island, Jun 1974) (with Nico, John Cale and Brian Eno)
- Lady June's Linguistic Leprosy (Caroline/Virgin, Nov 1974) (with Lady June and Brian Eno)
- Odd Ditties (Harvest 1976) (a collection of rarities and unreleased tracks)
- The Kevin Ayers Collection (SFM 1983)
- Banana Productions: The Best of Kevin Ayers (EMI 1989)
- BBC Live in Concert (Windsong 1992)
- Document Series Presents Kevin Ayers (Connoisseur Collection 1992)
- 1969–80 (Alex 1995)
- First Show in the Appearance Business: The BBC Sessions 1973–1976 (Strange Fruit 1996)
- The Garden of Love with Mike Oldfield and Robert Wyatt (Voiceprint 1997)
- Singing the Bruise: The BBC Sessions, 1970–1972 [live] (Strange Fruit 1998)
- Too Old to Die Young: BBC Live 1972–1976 (Hux 1998)
- Banana Follies (Hux 1998)
- Turn the Lights Down (live) with the Wizards of Twiddly (Market Square 2000)
- The Best of Kevin Ayers (EMI 2000)
- Didn't Feel Lonely Till I Thought of You: The Island Records Years (Edsel 2004)
- Alive in California (Box-O-Plenty Records, November 2004)
- BBC Sessions 1970–1976 (Hux 2005)
- Some Kevin Ayers (white label promo 2007)
- What More Can I Say... (Reel Recording, 2008) - A seven tracks compilation of early '70's home recordings
- Songs For Insane Times: An Anthology 1969–1980 (EMI, September 2008)
- The Harvest Years (5 X CD box set, Harvest 2012 ) – Includes Joy of a toy, Shooting at the Moon, whatevershebringswesing, Bananamour and The Confessions of Dr. Dream and other stories all with bonus tracks, single mixes, B sides, BBC session tracks. Odd ditties is omitted and Confessions is included despite it being originally released on Island, not Harvest.
