= Animals (Kevin Ayers song) =

Single by Kevin Ayers
- B-side: "Don't Fall In Love with Me"
- Released: 1980
- Genre: Rock
- Label: Columbia
- Songwriter(s): Kevin Ayers
- Producer(s): Joan Bibiloni

Kevin Ayers singles chronology
"Money Money Money" (1980)	"Animals" (1980)	"My Speeding Heart" (1983)

"Animals" was a Kevin Ayers Spanish single release. It was issued on the Columbia imprint of EMI shortly after his 1980 album, That's What You Get Babe. In 1978 Ayers had relocated to Deià, Spain where he found the more relaxed audiences suited his somewhat delicate sensibilities. "Animals" uses a Noah's Ark metaphor to take an aggressive swing at the oncoming 1980s consumerism, "Ain't you just like the animals / You do as you're told."

== Track listing ==
1. "Animals" (Kevin Ayers)
2. "Don't Fall In Love with Me"

== Personnel ==
- Kevin Ayers / Guitar, Vocals
