= Now Is the Happiest Time of Your Life =

Now Is The Happiest Time Of Your Life

Studio album by Daevid Allen
- Released: 1977, (Remaster 2009)
- Genre: Psychedelic folk
- Length: 45:19
- Label: Charly Records / (Esoteric Recordings)
- Producer: Daevid Allen

Daevid Allen chronology
Good Morning (1976)	Now Is The Happiest Time Of Your Life (1977)	N'Existe Pas (1979)

Professional ratings
Review scores
Source	Rating
Allmusic	4.5/5 stars

Now Is The Happiest Time Of Your Life is Daevid Allen's second solo studio album, originally released in 1977, and re-released in a digitally remastered version in 2009.

== Track listing ==
1. "Flamenco Zero"
2. "Why Do We Treat Ourselves Like We Do?"
3. "Tally & Orlando Meet the Cockpot Pixie"
4. "See You on the Moontower"
5. "Poet for Sale"
6. "Crocodile Nonsense Poem"
7. "Only Make Love If You Want To"
8. "I Am"
9. "Deya Goddess"

== Personnel ==
- Daevid Allen – Guitar, Vocals, Producer
- Joan Biblioni – Guitar
- Sam Gopal – Percussion
- Pepe Milan – Guitar
- Victor Peraino – Keyboards
- Xavier Riba – Violin
- Marianne Oberasche – Harp
