= Yes We Have No Mañanas (So Get Your Mañanas Today) =

Studio album by Kevin Ayers
- Released: June 1976
- Recorded: Spring 1976
- Studios: Basing Street, London
- Genre: Rock
- Length: 35:17
- Labels: Harvest (UK); ABC (US)
- Producer: Muff Winwood

Kevin Ayers chronology
Sweet Deceiver (1975)	Yes We Have No Mañanas (So Get Your Mañanas Today) (1976)	Rainbow Takeaway (1978)

Singles from Yes We Have No Mañanas (So Get Your Mañanas Today)
- 1. "Falling in Love Again" Released: March 5, 1976 (Europe only); 2. "Star" Released: April 22, 1977 (UK only); 3. "Mr. Cool" Released: 1977 (US only)

Professional ratings
Review scores
Source	Rating
AllMusic	2.5/5 stars
Village Voice	4.5/5 stars

Yes We Have No Mañanas (So Get Your Mañanas Today) is the seventh studio album by Kevin Ayers, released in June 1976. This LP marked Kevin Ayers's return to the leftfield Harvest label. Producer Muff Winwood employed a straightforward pop production that clipped some of Ayers's usual eccentricities from the tapes.

The band comprised Rob Townsend from Family on drums, Taste's Charlie McCracken on bass, B.J. Cole's steel guitar and Ollie Halsall's guitar.

== Track listing ==
All tracks written by Kevin Ayers except where noted.

Side one
No.	Title	Length
1.	"Star"	4:18
2.	"Mr. Cool"	3:00
3.	"The Owl"	3:14
4.	"Love's Gonna Turn You Round"	4:52
5.	"Falling in Love Again" (Reginald Connelly, Friedrich Hollander)	2:36

Side two
No.	Title	Length
6.	"Help Me"	2:40
7.	"Ballad of Mr Snake"	2:02
8.	"Everyone Knows The Song"	2:33
9.	"Yes I Do"	3:08
10.	"Blue"	6:26

2009 CD reissue bonus tracks
No.	Title	Recording source	Length
11.	"Mr. Cool"	John Peel Show, 13 July 1976	3:01
12.	"Love's Gonna Turn You Round"	John Peel Show, 13 July 1976	4:44
13.	"Star"	John Peel Show, 13 July 1976	4:42
14.	"Ballad of Mr. Snake"	John Peel Show, 13 July 1976	2:23
15.	"Shouting in a Bucket Blues"	BBC Paris Theatre, 30 September 1976	5:26
16.	"Star"	BBC Paris Theatre, 30 September 1976	4:40
17.	"Mr. Cool"	BBC Paris Theatre, 30 September 1976	3:44
18.	"Ballad of Mr. Snake"	BBC Paris Theatre, 30 September 1976	2:39
19.	"Blue"	BBC Paris Theatre, 30 September 1976	6:24

== Personnel ==
=== Musicians ===
- Kevin Ayers – guitar, vocals
- Billy Livsey – keyboards
- Charlie McCracken – bass
- Ollie Halsall – lead guitar
- Rob Townsend – drums, percussion
- Roger Saunders – rhythm guitar

=== Additional musicians ===
- B.J. Cole – steel guitar (tracks 3, 5)
- Rick Wills – bass (track 6)
- Zoot Money – keyboards (track 6)
- Tony Newman – drums (track 6)
- Andy Roberts – guitar (track 8)
- Mickey Feat – bass (track 8)
- Nick Rowley – keyboards (track 8)
- Roger Pope – drums (track 8)
- Pip Williams – arranger (track 5)
- David Bedford – choral arranger (track 10)

=== Technical ===
- Muff Winwood – producer
- Mike Robinson – engineer
- Peter Mew – mastering
- Peter Shepherd – design
- Peter Vernon – photography
- Mark Powell – liner notes

== References and Sources ==
- NME – Album review (June 1976)
- Original LP sleevenotes
