= Love Makes Sweet Music =

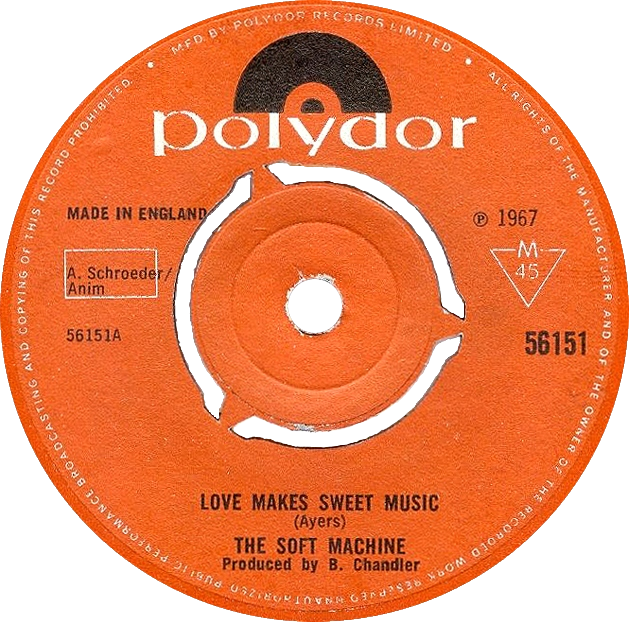
- Side A of the UK single

Single by Soft Machine
- B-side: "Feelin' Reelin' Squeelin'"
- Released: February 17, 1967
- Recorded: January 1967, Advision Studios
- Genre: Psychedelic rock
- Label: Polydor 56 151 (UK)
- Songwriter: Kevin Ayers
- Producers: Chas Chandler (A-side); Kim Fowley (B-side)

Soft Machine singles chronology
| "Love Makes Sweet Music" (1967) | "Joy of a Toy" (1968) |

"Love Makes Sweet Music" was the first UK single released by the psychedelic rock group Soft Machine. It is one of the first British psychedelic releases, predating Pink Floyd's "Arnold Layne" by three weeks. The A-side is more pop-oriented, featuring Robert Wyatt on lead vocals was recorded 5 February 1967 and produced by Chas Chandler. The other side, "Feelin’ Reelin Squeelin" was recorded January 1967 and produced by Kim Fowley. The latter features Kevin Ayers on lead vocal for the verses, while Wyatt sings the chorus. The single did not chart.

The tracks from the single have been reissued on the Soft Machine compilations Triple Echo and Out-Bloody-Rageous - An Anthology 1967 -1973 (Sony), on the 1972 Polydor compilation LP Rare Tracks, and on the 2009 CD edition of the album The Soft Machine. A cover of "Love Makes Sweet Music" was recorded by The Valentines, an early band of AC/DC frontman Bon Scott, as a B-side for their cover of "Peculiar Hole in the Sky".

== Track listing ==
1. "Love Makes Sweet Music" (Kevin Ayers)
2. "Feelin’ Reelin' Squeelin’" (Robert Wyatt)

== Personnel ==
- Kevin Ayers - guitar ("Love Makes Sweet Music"), bass ("Feelin..."), vocals
- Daevid Allen - bass ("Love Makes Sweet Music"), guitar ("Feelin...")
- Robert Wyatt – drums, vocals
- Mike Ratledge - keyboards
