= June 1, 1974 =

1974 live album by various artists

Live album by various
- Released: 28 June 1974
- Recorded: 1 June 1974
- Venues: Rainbow Theatre, London, England
- Genre: Art rock
- Length: 45:54
- Label: Island
- Producer: Richard Williams

Kevin Ayers chronology
The Confessions of Dr. Dream and Other Stories (1974)	June 1, 1974 (1974)	Lady June's Linguistic Leprosy (1974)

John Cale chronology
Paris 1919 (1973)	June 1, 1974 (1974)	Fear (1974)

Brian Eno chronology
Here Come the Warm Jets (1974)	June 1, 1974 (1974)	Taking Tiger Mountain (1974)

Nico chronology
Andy Warhol's Velvet Underground Featuring Nico (1971)	June 1, 1974 (1974)	The End... (1974)

Professional ratings
Review scores
Source	Rating
AllMusic	3/5 stars
Christgau's Record Guide	B+
Spin Alternative Record Guide	6/10

June 1, 1974 is a live album of songs performed at the Rainbow Theatre in London on 1 June 1974. The album is officially attributed to all principal performers Kevin Ayers, John Cale, Brian Eno and Nico, although other well-known musicians, including Mike Oldfield, Robert Wyatt, and Ollie Halsall, also contributed to the concert. The record has often been referred to as the "A.C.N.E." album, for the initials of Ayers, Cale, Nico, and Eno.

== Content ==
The cover photograph was taken by Mick Rock in the foyer of the Rainbow Theatre shortly before the concert began. The wry stare between John Cale (right) and Kevin Ayers is said to be explained by the fact that Cale had caught Ayers sleeping with his wife the night before the show. The couple would divorce the next year.

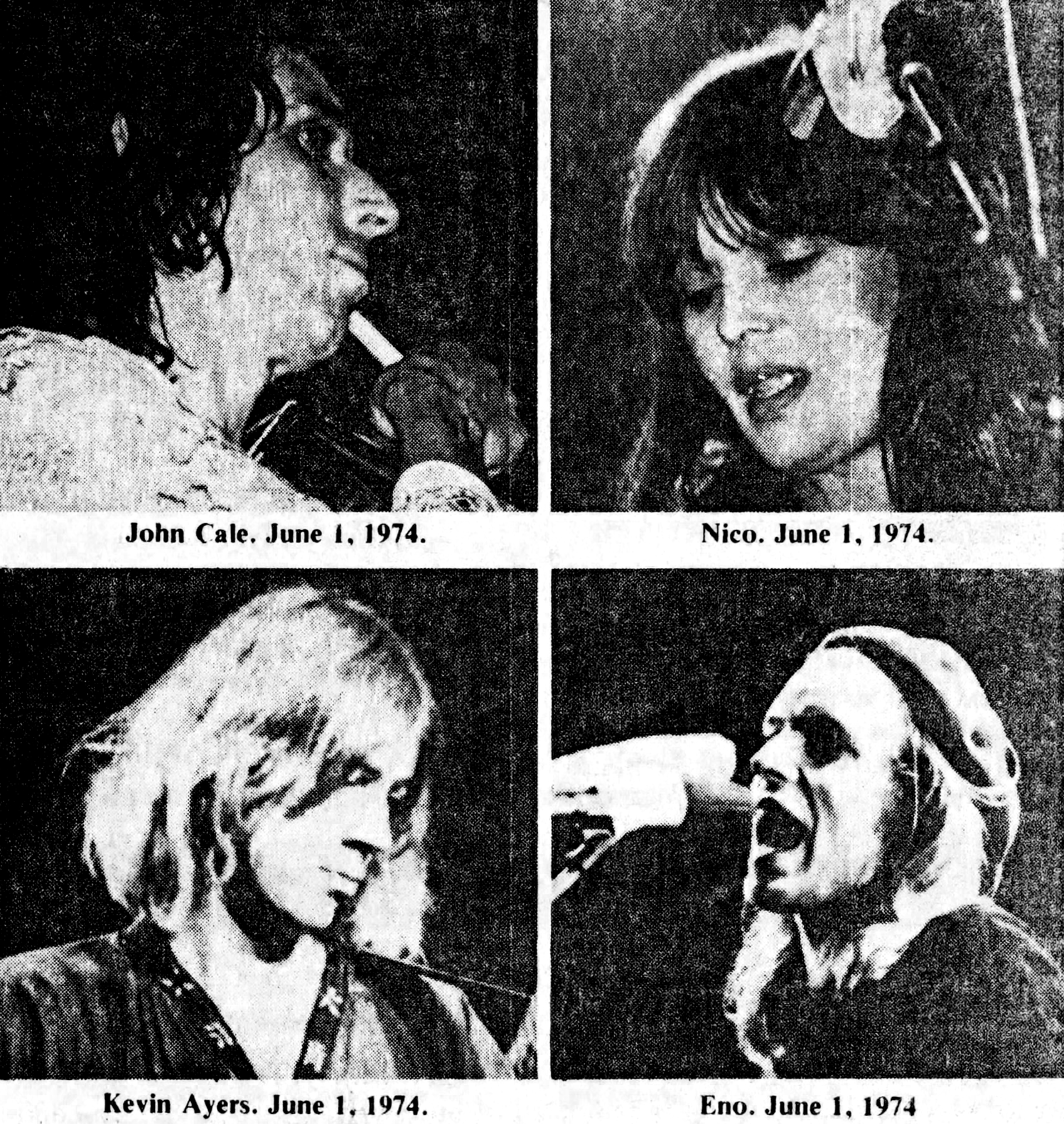
A collage of John Cale, Nico, Kevin Ayers, and Brian Eno performing at London's Rainbow Theatre on 1 June 1974.

Other songs that were performed but did not make the LP include Ayers' "I've Got a Hard-On for You Baby" (with Cale on backing vocals), Cale's "Buffalo Ballet" and "Gun", and Nico's "Janitor of Lunacy" and her rendition of "Das Lied der Deutschen".

Nico’s performance of "Das Lied der Deutschen" was released as a bonus track on the 2012 reissue of her 1974 album The End....

== Critical reception ==
Robert Christgau wrote of the record in Christgau's Record Guide: Rock Albums of the Seventies (1981):

"The highlights of a concert organized by genial eccentric Kevin Ayers (ex-Soft Machine, but he got out when the getting was good), this offers one side of Ayers's genially eccentric songs and one of Eno singing Eno songs at full volume (note demonic cackle) and John Cale singing an Elvis Presley song at full volume (note lupine howl). And also, oh well, Nico singing 'The End.' But if there's gotta be art-rock, Lord, let it be like this."

== Track listing ==
All tracks are written by Kevin Ayers, except where noted.

Side A
No.	Title	Writer(s)	Length
1.	"Driving Me Backwards"	Brian Eno	6:07
2.	"Baby's on Fire"	Eno	3:52
3.	"Heartbreak Hotel"	Mae Boren Axton, Tommy Durden, Elvis Presley	5:19
4.	"The End"	John Densmore, Robbie Krieger, Ray Manzarek, Jim Morrison	9:14

Side B
No.	Title	Length
1.	"May I?"	5:30
2.	"Shouting in a Bucket Blues"	5:07
3.	"Stranger in Blue Suede Shoes"	3:27
4.	"Everybody's Sometime and Some People's All the Time Blues"	4:35
5.	"Two Goes into Four"	2:28

== Personnel ==
- Kevin Ayers – vocals (B1–5), guitar (B1–5), bass guitar (A1–2)
- Brian Eno – vocals (A1–2), synthesizer (A1–4, B5)
- John Cale – vocals (A3), piano (A2), viola (A1, B5)
- Nico – vocals (A4), harmonium (A4)
- Mike Oldfield – lead guitar (B4), acoustic guitar (B5)
- Ollie Halsall – piano (A1), guitar (A2–3, B4), lead guitar (B1–3), acoustic guitar (B5)
- John "Rabbit" Bundrick – organ (A1–3, B1–5), organ, piano, electric piano (B1–3)
- Robert Wyatt – percussion (A1–3, B1–3 + 5)
- Doreen Chanter – backing vocals (A3)
- Archie Leggatt – bass guitar (A1–3, B1–3 + 5)
- Eddie Sparrow – drums (A2–3, B1–3), bass drum (A1), tympani (B5)
- Liza Strike – backing vocals (A3)
- Irene Chanter – backing vocals (A3)

Technical

- John Wood – engineer
- Phil Ault – assistant engineer
- Ray Doyle – assistant engineer
- Ian Tilbury – concert presenter
- Richard Williams – producer
