= Oh! Wot a Dream =

Single by Kevin Ayers

from the album Bananamour
- B-side: "Connie on a Rubber Band"
- Released: Nov, 1972
- Genre: Psychedelic pop; country
- Label: Harvest
- Songwriter: Kevin Ayers
- Producers: Kevin Ayers & Andrew King

Kevin Ayers singles chronology
"Stranger in Blue Suede Shoes" (1971)	"Oh! Wot a Dream" (1972)	"Caribbean Moon" (1973)

"Oh! Wot a Dream" was a Kevin Ayers single taken from his fourth solo album Bananamour. Ayers has stated in interviews that 'Oh! Wot A Dream' was about his friend and colleague Syd Barrett – "You are the most extraordinary person / You write the most peculiar kind of tunes / I met you floating as I was boating / One Afternoon". 'Connie On A Rubber Band' was a non album track, which is a ska rendition of his song Clarence in Wonderland from Shooting at the Moon, that would later be included on 1976 compilation Odd Ditties.

== Track listing ==
1. "Oh! Wot A Dream" (Kevin Ayers)
2. "Connie On A Rubber Band" (Kevin Ayers)

== Personnel ==
- Kevin Ayers - guitar, vocals
- Eddie Sparrow - percussion
