= Mr. Cool (Kevin Ayers song) =

"Mr Cool"

Single by Kevin Ayers

from the album Yes We Have No Mañanas (So Get Your Mañanas Today)
- B-side: "Mr Cool"
- Released: April 1977
- Genre: Rock
- Length: 3:00
- Label: ABC (USA)
- Songwriter(s): Kevin Ayers
- Producer(s): Muff Winwood

Kevin Ayers singles chronology
"Star" (1977)	"Mr Cool" (1977)	"Money Money Money" (1980)

"Mr Cool" was Kevin Ayers' USA promotional single issued to publicize his album Yes We Have No Mañanas (So Get Your Mañanas Today). It featured a mono mix of the song on one side coupled with a stereo mix on the flip side.

== Track listing ==
1. "Mr Cool" (Kevin Ayers)
2. "Mr Cool (Stereo)" (Kevin Ayers)

== Personnel ==
- Kevin Ayers – Guitar, Vocals
- Billy Livsey – Keyboards
- Charlie McCracken – Bass
- Ollie Halsall – Guitar
- Rob Townsend – Drums, percussion
- Roger Saunders – Guitar
