= Star (Kevin Ayers song) =

Single by Kevin Ayers

from the album Yes We Have No Mañanas (So Get Your Mañanas Today)
- B-side: "The Owl"
- Released: April 1977
- Genre: Rock
- Label: Harvest
- Producer(s): Muff Winwood

Kevin Ayers singles chronology
"Falling in Love Again" (1976)	"Star" (1977)	"Mr. Cool" (1977)

"Star" was the second Kevin Ayers single issued to promote his 1976 album, Yes We Have No Mañanas (So Get Your Mañanas Today). Both songs were featured on the LP. Ayers would not release another single in the UK for three years.

== Track listing ==
1. "Star" (Kevin Ayers)
2. "The Owl" (Kevin Ayers)

== Personnel ==
- Kevin Ayers / Guitar, Vocals
- Billy Livsey / Keyboards
- Charlie McCracken / Bass
- Ollie Halsall /Guitar
- Rob Townsend / Drums, percussion
- Roger Saunders Guitar
- B.J. Cole / Steel Guitar
