= Sweet Deceiver =

Studio album by Kevin Ayers
- Released: March 1975
- Recorded: 1975
- Studios: The Manor, Shipton-on-Cherwell, England
- Genres: Rock, progressive pop
- Length: 34:53
- Label: Island
- Producers: Kevin Ayers, Ollie Halsall

Kevin Ayers chronology
Lady June's Linguistic Leprosy (1975)	Sweet Deceiver (1975)	Yes We Have No Mañanas (So Get Your Mañanas Today) (1976)

Professional ratings
Review scores
Source	Rating
AllMusic	3/5 stars

Sweet Deceiver is the sixth studio album by Kevin Ayers and his last for Island Records. It is one of Ayers' more rock-oriented productions, with the first side featuring the progressive material, while the second was more mainstream. Guitarist Ollie Halsall was now a key foil for Ayers and his playing on the opening track "Observations" is a clear demonstration of his dexterity. Elton John also joined the sessions, contributing some outstanding piano work to several tracks, including "Circular Letter" and "Toujours Le Voyage".

== Background ==
By 1975, Kevin Ayers had joined the roster of Elton John's manager and partner John Reid, who put considerable energy into turning him into a mainstream artist, booking him appearances on early morning children's TV shows. Reid's concept was to market Ayers as a pretty boy rock star and the cover painting he commissioned for Sweet Deceiver demonstrates this to shocking effect.

Ayers, however, was still a maverick musician and the packaging of the LP was alarmingly at odds with its contents which were some of his more poignant recordings. It was little wonder therefore, that critics like the NME's Nick Kent (a long-time supporter), dismayed by Ayers' new image, wrote virulent attacks on the LP. Ayers has subsequently stated in interviews that he was "deeply upset" by Kent's reaction to the album, although he failed to notice how delicately the scales of credibility were balanced within the 70s avant-garde music scene. Kent commented (NME, Dec 7, 1974) that when he first heard the song "Sweet Deceiver" at a Glasgow Apollo concert, "it rhymed 'rain' with 'pain' to questionable effect."

However, it is Ayers himself who offers the most accurate critique of the situation in "Guru Banana" where he pointedly satirises his own pop promotion; "Who's the one with the grin on his face / Says he's gonna save the human race / He laughs a lot as he climbs to fame / Now what's his name? / Guru Banana! / That's me and I'll show you the light / I've got the answers and they're all right / 'cause I'm divine and you can be the same / Now what's my name? / Guru Banana!"

== Track listing ==
All tracks written by Kevin Ayers.

Side one
No.	Title	Length
1.	"Observations"	4:20
2.	"Guru Banana"	2:43
3.	"City Waltz"	3:30
4.	"Toujours La Voyage"	8:56

Side two
No.	Title	Length
5.	"Sweet Deceiver"	3:47
6.	"Diminished But Not Finished"	2:52
7.	"Circular Letter"	4:27
8.	"Once Upon An Ocean"	3:27
9.	"Farewell Again (Another Dawn)"	3:11

2009 CD reissue bonus tracks - (All tracks recorded live at the BBC Paris Theatre on March 27th 1975)
No.	Title	Length
10.	"Didn't Feel Lonely 'til I Thought of You"	5:21
11.	"Observations"	5:31
12.	"Stranger in Blue Suede Shoes"	4:51
13.	"Interview"	6:03
14.	"Farewell Again"	4:40

== Personnel ==
=== Musicians ===
- Kevin Ayers – vocals, fuzz bass, electric and acoustic 6 and 12 string guitars, mandolin
- Freddie Smith – drums
- Ollie Halsall – lead, acoustic and bass guitar, mandolin, honk piano, vibes, backing vocals (track 8)

Ollie Halsall is credited on the original album as Ollie Haircut.

=== Additional musicians ===
- Jacob Magnusson – organ, accordion, piano, clavinet, (tracks 1, 3–4, 6, 8), vocals (track 1)
- John Altman – clarinet (track 2)
- Fuzzy Samuels – bass guitar (track 8)
- Elton John – piano (tracks 2, 4, 7)
- Bias Boshell – piano (track 5)
- Chili Charles – drums (track 8)
- Muscle Shoals Horns – brass (track 8)
- The Manor choir – backing vocals (tracks 3, 8)

=== Technical ===
- Kevin Ayers, Ollie Halsall – producers
- Steve Cox – engineer
- Vic Gamm – engineer
- Joe Gaffney – photography
- Tony Wright – cover art

== References and Sources ==
- "Ayers and Graces" by Nick Kent (NME Dec 7, 1974)
- "Despair and Temperence in Maida Vale" by Mike Flood Page (Sounds Jan 25, 1975)
- "Cousin Kevin" by Hervé Picart (Extra [FR] Apr, 1975)
- Album Review by Paul Alessandrini (Rock & Folk [FR] Apr, 1975)
- "Soft Centered" by Pierre Perrone (The Independent Sep 10, 2007)
- Original LP sleevenotes
