= Butterfly Dance =

Single by Kevin Ayers
- B-side: "Puis Je?"
- Released: October 1970
- Genre: Psychedelic rock
- Label: Harvest
- Songwriter: Kevin Ayers
- Producers: Peter Jenner & Kevin Ayers

Kevin Ayers single singles chronology
"Singing a Song in the Morning" (1970)	"Butterfly Dance" (1970)	"Stranger in Blue Suede Shoes" (1971)

"Butterfly Dance" was the second Kevin Ayers single. It was an exclusive release that did not appear on the contemporaneous album Shooting at the Moon. The flip side was a French-language version of Ayers' "May I?"

== Track listing ==
1. "Butterfly Dance" (Kevin Ayers)
2. "Puis Je?" (Kevin Ayers)

== Personnel ==
- Kevin Ayers / Guitar, bass, Vocals
- David Bedford / organ, piano, accordion
- Lol Coxhill / Saxophone
- Mike Oldfield / Bass, Guitar
- Mick Fincher / Drums, percussion
- The Ladybirds / Backing Vocals
