= The Unfairground =

Studio album by Kevin Ayers
- Released: September 2007
- Recorded: 2006–2007
- Studios: Wavelab, Tucson, Arizona; Marlborough Farms, New York City; Eastcote, London; Gallery, London; YipJump, Glasgow
- Genre: Rock
- Length: 34:02
- Label: LO-MAX
- Producers: Timothy Shepard; Peter Henderson; Gary Olson

Kevin Ayers chronology
Still Life with Guitar (1992)	The Unfairground (2007)

Professional ratings
Review scores
Source	Rating
AllMusic	4/5 stars
BBC	very favourable
Mojo	4/5 stars
Q	4/5 stars
Stylus	A−
The Times	4/5 stars
Uncut	4/5

The Unfairground is the fifteenth and final studio album by Kevin Ayers, recorded with members of Ladybug Transistor, Teenage Fanclub, Neutral Milk Hotel, Gorky's Zygotic Mynci and Roxy Music. It was his sixteenth studio LP and his first new set of recordings in fifteen years, as well as the last album released before his death in 2013. It was recorded in New York City; Tucson, Arizona; London; and Glasgow. It debuted at No. 14 in the UK Indie Album chart.

The Unfairground deals with themes of love, loss and the passing of time, and it has received strong critical endorsements for its author's ruminations on his tumultuous life. Ayers stated in a 2007 Sunday Times interview that it is "very much a reflective album: lost love, lost feelings, lost sensibilities. I had to include some of my blood, sweat and tears – if you are going to be honest, it can't be avoided."

== Track listing ==
All tracks are written by Kevin Ayers.

No.	Title	Length
1.	"Only Heaven Knows"	2:47
2.	"Cold Shoulder"	3:09
3.	"Walk on Water"	3:14
4.	"Friends and Strangers"	3:36
5.	"Shine a Light"	3:47
6.	"Wide Awake"	2:54
7.	"Baby Come Home"	2:36
8.	"Brainstorm"	4:31
9.	"Unfairground"	3:51
10.	"Run, Run, Run"	3:37

== Personnel ==
=== Musicians ===
- Kevin Ayers – guitar, vocals
- Gary Olson – trumpet, producer
- San Fadyl – drums
- Jeff Baron – guitar
- Norman Blake – guitar, backing vocals
- Francis MacDonald – drums
- Julian Koster – singing saw
- Candie Payne – backing vocals
- Euros Childs – backing vocals
- Bill Wells – bass
- Joe McGinty – keyboards
- Phil Manzanera – guitar
- Robbie McIntosh – guitar
- Hugh Hopper – bass
- Daisy Martey – backing vocals
- Tucson Philharmonia – strings
- Bridget St. John – vocals
- Dave McGowan – pedal steel
- Heather McIntosh – bass, cello
- Kellie Sutherland – brass
- Tara Shackell – brass
- Isobel Knowles – brass
- Gus Franklin – brass
- Graham Henderson – accordion
- Peter Nicholson – cello
- Francis Reader – backing vocals
- The Wyattron

=== Technical ===
- Peter Henderson – producer
- Timothy Shepard – producer, artwork, executive producer
- Bernard MacMahon – executive producer
