= Lady June's Linguistic Leprosy =

Studio album by Lady June
- Released: November 1974
- Genre: Spoken word; experimental music
- Length: 31:29
- Label: Caroline; Market Square (reissue); See For Miles SEECD350 (reissue)
- Producer: David Vorhaus

Kevin Ayers chronology
June 1, 1974 (1974)	Lady June's Linguistic Leprosy (1974)	Sweet Deceiver (1975)

Professional ratings
Review scores
Source	Rating
AllMusic	3.5/5 stars
Select	3/5 stars

Lady June's Linguistic Leprosy is an experimental music/spoken word album by poet Lady June (a.k.a. June Campbell Cramer). It features musical contributions by Kevin Ayers and Brian Eno.

== Overview ==
The recording was made for £400 in the living room of Kevin Ayers' Maida Vale home. The original release was of 5,000 copies which quickly sold once followers of Eno and Ayers realized that they contributed to the recording. The album was later reissued by Market Square Records.

== Track listing ==
Music by Kevin Ayers except "Optimism" by Brian Eno and "Am I?" by Kim Solomon. Lyrics by June Campbell Cramer.

Side 1

1. "Some Day Silly Twenty Three" – 2:25
2. "Reflections" – 1:10
3. "Am I?" – 2:33
4. "Everythingsnothing" – 4:25
5. "Tunion" – 4:16
6. "The Tourist" – 2:22

Side 2

1. "Bars" – 2:46
2. "The Letter" – 4:03
3. "Mangel/Wurzel" – 0:58
4. "To Whom It May Not Concern" – 2:52
5. "Optimism" – 1:34
6. "Touch Downer" – 1:59

== Personnel ==
- Lady June – vocals
- Kevin Ayers – guitar, bass, vocals
- Brian Eno – electronic guitar, bass, imminent, linearment, lunar lollipops, vocals
- Pip Pyle – drums
- Martha – vocals
- David Vorhaus – kaleidophone, mix
- Jakob Klasse – piano
- Kim Solomon – piano on "Am I"
