= Diamond Jack and the Queen of Pain =

Studio album by Kevin Ayers
- Released: June 1983
- Recorded: 1983
- Studio: Spain
- Genre: Rock
- Label: Charly
- Producer: Julián Ruiz

Kevin Ayers chronology
That's What You Get Babe (1980)	Diamond Jack and the Queen of Pain (1983)	Deia...Vu (1984)

Singles from Diamond Jack and the Queen of Pain
- 1. "My Speeding Heart" Released: July 1983

Professional ratings
Review scores
Source	Rating
AllMusic	2/5 stars

Diamond Jack and the Queen of Pain is the tenth solo album by Kevin Ayers, a founding member of Soft Machine.

== Track listing ==
All tracks composed by Kevin Ayers, except where indicated

1. "Madame Butterfly" – 4:30
2. "Lay Lady Lay" (Bob Dylan) – 4:19
3. "Who's Still Crazy" – 4:46
4. "You Keep Me Hangin' On" (J.J. Cale) – 3:26
5. "You Are a Big Girl" – 3:31
6. "Steppin' Out" (Ayers, Ollie Halsall) – 5:15
7. "My Speeding Heart" – 4:19
8. "Howling Man" – 3:28
9. "Give a Little Bit" – 3:51
10. "Champagne and Valium" – 3:05

== Personnel ==
=== Musicians ===
- Kevin Ayers – guitar, vocals
- Ollie Halsall – guitar, backing vocals
- Carlos Garcia Vaso – guitars & keyboards
- Joaquin Montoya – keyboards
- Manolo Aguilar – bass
- Javier de Juan – drums, percussion
- Zanna Gregmar – backing vocals
- Jimmy Kashisian – horn arrangements

=== Technical ===
- Julian Ruiz – producer
- Luis F. Soria – engineer
- Yeldham Muchmore – design
