= Rainbow Takeaway =

Studio album by Kevin Ayers
- Released: April 1978
- Recorded: 1978
- Studios: Workshop, UK
- Genre: Rock
- Length: 36:08
- Label: Harvest
- Producers: Kevin Ayers, Anthony Moore

Kevin Ayers chronology
Yes We Have No Mañanas (So Get Your Mañanas Today) (1976)	Rainbow Takeaway (1978)	That's What You Get Babe (1980)

Professional ratings
Review scores
Source	Rating
AllMusic	2/5 stars

Rainbow Takeaway is the eighth studio album by Kevin Ayers. The core band is essentially the same as in his previous album, Yes We Have No Mañanas (So Get Your Mañanas Today). Rainbow Takeaway marks the close of Ayers' progressive sound, with Billy Livsey's synthesizer flourishes on "A View from the Mountain" providing a final coda to that era. Soul and country elements are also present on Rainbow Takeaway, coupled with reggae rhythms on "Beware of the Dog II". The eccentric Ayers mélange is in full effect on the chaotic closer "Hat Song". Ayers retired to Deià, Spain, shortly after the album's release.

== Track listing ==
All tracks composed by Kevin Ayers

1. "Blaming It All on Love" – 3:00
2. "Ballad of a Salesman Who Sold Himself" – 4:30
3. "A View from the Mountain" – 6:15
4. "Rainbow Takeaway" – 3:50
5. "Waltz for You" – 5:22
6. "Beware of the Dog II" – 5:59
7. "Strange Song" – 2:41
8. "Goodnight Goodnight" – 3:06
9. "Hat Song" – 1:17

== Personnel ==
=== Musicians ===
- Kevin Ayers – guitar, vocals
- Ollie Halsall – guitar
- Billy Livsey – keyboards
- Rob Townsend – drums
- Charles McCracken – bass, guitar
- Anthony Moore – keyboards
- Graham Preskett – violin
- Barry DeSouza – drums

=== Technical ===
- Anthony Moore – producer
- Kevin Ayers – producer
- Brian Palmer – art direction
- Sharon Coventry – artwork
- Peter Vernon – photography
