= Falling Up (Kevin Ayers album) =

Studio album by Kevin Ayers
- Released: February 1988
- Recorded: May–June 1987
- Studio: Trak, Madrid, Spain
- Genre: Rock
- Length: 37:08
- Label: Virgin
- Producer: Colin Fairley

Kevin Ayers chronology
As Close As You Think (1986)	Falling Up (1988)	Still Life with Guitar (1992)

Professional ratings
Review scores
Source	Rating
AllMusic	3.0/5 stars

Falling Up is the thirteenth studio album by Kevin Ayers, released on Virgin Records in 1988.

The song "Flying Start" was first released on the Mike Oldfield album Islands in September 1987.

== Track listing ==
1. "(Another) Saturday Night (In Deya)" (Kevin Ayers, Peter Halsall) – 4:02
2. "Flying Start" (Mike Oldfield) – 3:38
3. "The Best We Have" (Ayers, Halsall) – 3:29
4. "Another Rolling Stone" (Ayers, Marvin Siau) – 5:17
5. "Do You Believe" (Ayers) – 5:54
6. "That's What We Did (Today)" (Ayers, Halsall) – 3:44
7. "Night Fighters" (Ayers, Halsall) – 4:58
8. "Am I Really Marcel?" (Ayers) – 5:59

In the songwriting credits, Ollie Halsall's real name, Peter, is used.

== Personnel ==
=== Musicians ===
- Kevin Ayers – guitar, vocals, harmonica, percussion
- Ollie Halsall – guitar, keyboards, drums, bass, backing vocals
- Luis Dulzaides – congas
- Marcelo Fuentes – bass
- Javier Paxariño – soprano saxophone
- Ñete (Antonio Martín-Caruana) – drums
- Tony Vázquez – drums, bongos
- Pablo Salinas – piano
- Miguel Herrero – guitars
- El Reverendo – Hammond organ
- Charles J. Beale, Chuck "C' Note" Brown, Patrick Patterson, Andrea Bronston, Mary Jamison – backing vocals

=== Technical ===
- Colin Fairley – producer
- Eugenio Muñoz – engineer
- David De La Torre – assistant engineer
- Oscar Mariné – artwork
- Jordi Socías – photography
