= Still Life with Guitar =

Studio album by Kevin Ayers
- Released: January 1992
- Recorded: 1991
- Studio: Chipping Norton, Oxfordshire, England; The Church, London; Townhouse, West London; Marcus, London; Strongroom, East London; Nomis, London; Real World, Box, Wiltshire
- Genre: Rock
- Length: 34:30
- Label: fnac
- Producer: Kevin Ayers and Dave Vatch

Kevin Ayers chronology
Falling Up (1988)	Still Life with Guitar (1992)	The Unfairground (2007)

Professional ratings
Review scores
Source	Rating
AllMusic	2.5/5 stars

Still Life with Guitar is the fourteenth studio album by Kevin Ayers. It was the final recording to feature guitarist Ollie Halsall, who died shortly after its release. Ayers would not record another album of new material for fifteen years.

== Track listing ==
All tracks composed by Kevin Ayers; except where noted.

1. "Feeling This Way" – 2:43
2. "Something in Between" (Ayers, Mark Nevin) – 3:15
3. "Thank You Very Much" – 3:18
4. "There Goes Johnny" – 4:03
5. "Ghost Train" (Ayers, Peter Halsall) – 4:27
6. "I Don't Depend on You" – 3:36
7. "When Your Parents Go to Sleep" – 4:46
8. "M16" – 2:54
9. "Don't Blame Them" – 1:53
10. "Irene Goodnight" (Traditional; arranged by Ayers) – 3:29

== Personnel ==
=== Musicians ===
- Kevin Ayers – guitar, vocals
- Ollie Halsall – acoustic guitar (tracks 5, 8–9), vibraphone (track 6)
- Mark E. Nevin – acoustic guitar (tracks 3–4, 7, 10)
- Mike Oldfield – guitar (track 6)
- B.J. Cole – pedal steel guitar (tracks 4, 7)
- Kevin Armstrong – guitar (tracks 1, 7)
- Stuart Bruce – synthesizer (track 8), backing vocals (track 6)
- Simon Clarke – Hammond organ (track 6)
- Graham Henderson – Hammond organ (track 7), piano (track 2), accordion (track 4, 10)
- Anthony Moore – synthesizer (track 2), keyboards (tracks 3, 5)
- Danny Thompson – double bass (tracks 4–9)
- Richard Lee – double bass (track 10)
- Simon Edwards – guitarrón (track 3)
- Roy Dodds – drums (tracks 3–5, 7, 9–10)
- Gavin Harrison – drums (tracks 6, 8)
- Steve Monti – drums (track 1)
- Ben Darlow – backing vocals (track 6)

=== Technical ===
- Kevin Ayers – producer
- Dave Vatch – producer
- Ben Darlow – engineer
- Martin Mitchell – engineer
- Stuart Bruce – engineer
- Mathias Augustyniak, Michaël Amzalag – art direction, design, illustration
- Dan Salzmann – photography
