= Singing a Song in the Morning =

Single by Kevin Ayers and The Whole World
- B-side: "Eleanor's Cake (Which Ate Her)"
- Released: Feb 1970
- Genre: Psychedelic rock
- Length: 2:48
- Label: Harvest HAR 5011
- Songwriter: Kevin Ayers
- Producers: Peter Jenner, Malcolm Jones

Kevin Ayers and The Whole World singles chronology
"Singing a Song in the Morning" (1970)	"Butterfly Dance" (1970)

"Singing a Song in the Morning" (originally titled "Religious Experience") was the first solo single released by Kevin Ayers, one of the founding members of the band Soft Machine. It was issued three months after Ayers' debut solo LP Joy of a Toy, and the artist was credited on the record label as Kevin Ayers and the Whole World. Although the song was not included on the original Joy of a Toy album, the single's B-side, "Eleanor's Cake (Which Ate Her)", was on the album.

Accompanying Ayers were three members of the band Caravan—cousins David and Richard Sinclair, and Richard Coughlan. Syd Barrett, recently departed from Pink Floyd, played guitar on the session, but his part was left off the mix of the 1970 single.

Members of Soft Machine had recorded on Barrett's first solo album, The Madcap Laughs. It was around this time that Barrett recorded the guitar part for Ayers on this track. The version with Barrett was first issued on the 2003 expanded reissue of Joy of a Toy. However, the track listing confused the take featuring Barrett with another unused version which also featured on the CD - The take with Barrett playing was listed as the one without and vice versa (The takes without Barrett have only two guitars – acoustic and 12-string electric. The version with Barrett has a third guitar – a six string electric – playing along)

Part of the lyrics of "Singing a Song in the Morning" were adapted by Robert Wyatt in the composition "Moon in June", a suite which appeared on Third, the Soft Machine album released in June 1970.

== Track listing ==
All tracks written by Kevin Ayers.

1. "Singing a Song in the Morning"
2. "Eleanor's Cake (Which Ate Her)"

== Personnel ==
- Kevin Ayers – Guitars and Vocals
- David Sinclair – Organ, Mellotron
- Richard Sinclair – Bass
- Richard Coughlan – Drums
- The Ladybirds – Backing Vocals
- Syd Barrett – Guitar
