= Will Z. =

Belgian musician

- Origin: Belgium
- Genres: Psychedelic rock; Psychedelic folk
- Occupations: Singer, songwriter, record producer
- Instruments: Vocals; keyboards; guitar; percussion; sitar
- Years active: 2008–present
- Formerly of: Cosmic Trip Machine, Black Moon Tape
- Website: www.openyoureyesprod.com/willz

Will Z. is a musician, multi-instrumentalist, singer and record producer from Belgium, leader of Cosmic Trip Machine and Black Moon Tape, and producer of Book of AM with the Psychedelic folk band Can am des puig and Daevid Allen from Gong.

== Biography ==
In 2008, Will Z. founded Cosmic Trip Machine and recorded four albums, Lord Space Devil, Vampyros Roussos, The Curse of Lord Space Devil and Golden Horus Name for the Berlin-based Nasoni Records, home of Earthling Society, Vibravoid, Space Invaders & Nik Turner... In March 2016, Iggy Pop broadcast three extracts of Golden Horus Name on his BBC Radio 6 Music show

During Golden Horus Name sessions, Will Z. helped the Psychedelic folk band Can am des puig, formed in 1977 in Deià, to finish their four parts project and worked with Daevid Allen and Gilli Smyth from Gong before launching a solo career.

His first solo album, Shambhala Album, inspired by meditation is recorded, produced and distributed in 10 days. In 2013, Will Z. worked on 12 Visions, based on Là-bas by French novelist Joris-Karl Huysmans and Dark Tales, inspired by Syd Barrett and the first Black Sabbath albums. Will Z. used Korg MS-20 plugged in Turbo RAT effects pedal to create Drone metal ambiances.

After the release of his next album, New Start, with the first posthumous appearances of Daevid Allen and Carmeta Mansilla, lead singer of Can AM Des Puig, on an album, Will Z. performed in 2015 during concerts in Belgium and Germany with guests like Sharron Kraus and Alice Artaud. He wrote his last solo album in 2016, A New Mirrored You, inspired by La Vita Nuova, a text by Dante Alighieri.

In June 2017, Will Z. founded his new band Black Moon Tape and recorded another Concept album with songs written during 20 years and left unfinished. The album was available for download in several digital music stores, such as the iTunes Store with the help from Freaksville Records label.

== Discography ==
=== Solo albums ===
- 2012 : Shambhala Album (as Will Z.'s Amazing Flying Clock)
- 2013 : 12 Visions
- 2014 : Dark Tales of Will Z.
- 2015 : New Start
- 2016 : A New Mirrored You

=== Albums by other artists ===
- 2011 : oG Musique – The Woman Who Took a Flying Leap over the Fence
- 2012 : Can am des puig – The Book of AM
- 2015 : Alice Artaud – Ouroboros
- 2016 : oG Musique - Out of the Darkness, illustrated by Wayne Anderson, published by Open Your Eyes

=== With Cosmic Trip Machine ===
- 2008 : Lord Space Devil
- 2009 : Vampyros Roussos
- 2010 : The Curse of Lord Space Devil
- 2012 : Golden Horus Name

=== With Black Moon Tape ===
- 2017 : The Salvation of Morgane
