= Shooting at the Moon (album) =

Studio album by Kevin Ayers and the Whole World
- Released: October 1970
- Recorded: April–September 1970
- Studio: Abbey Road, London
- Genre: Progressive rock; Canterbury scene; psychedelic rock; experimental rock
- Length: 41.04
- Label: Harvest
- Producer: Kevin Ayers, Peter Jenner

Kevin Ayers and the Whole World chronology
Joy of a Toy (1969)	Shooting at the Moon (1970)	Whatevershebringswesing (1971)

Shooting at the Moon is the second solo album by Kevin Ayers, released in October 1970 through Harvest Records.

== Recording ==
In early 1970, Ayers assembled a band he called the Whole World to tour his debut LP Joy of a Toy that included a young Mike Oldfield, David Bedford, Lol Coxhill, Mick Fincher, the folk singer Bridget St. John and Robert Wyatt. After a UK tour, Ayers took the Whole World into the studio to cut an LP, produced, like his debut, with Peter Jenner.

The line-up produced a heady mixture of ideas and experimentation with two distinctive styles emerging; carefree ballads like "Clarence in Wonderland" and "May I?" abutted the avant-garde experimentation of songs like "Reinhardt and Geraldine" and "Underwater". The album has since become a best seller in Ayers' catalogue.

== Legacy ==
Although the Whole World disbanded shortly after the release, the nucleus of the group would contribute to Ayers next LP, Whatevershebringswesing. Ayers released a single of exclusive material at the time "Butterfly Dance" coupled with "Puis Je?" (a French-language version of "May I?")

Gorky's Zygotic Mynci, who were big fans of Ayers, referred to Shooting at the Moon as "the best album ever made" in the sleeve notes to their 1994 album Tatay. David Ross Smith of AllMusic described the record as "a snapshot of the era...saturated with original ideas, experimentation, and lunacy, all powered by the bottled grape."

Harvest Records re-released the album on CD in 2003.

== Critical reception ==
Professional ratings
Review scores
Source	Rating
AllMusic	2/5 stars
The Encyclopedia of Popular Music	5/5 stars

David Ross Smith of AllMusic wrote, "A snapshot of the era, the album is saturated with original ideas, experimentation, and lunacy, all powered by the bottled grape." In 1998, The Wire named Shooting at the Moon one of the "100 Records That Set the World on Fire (When No One Was Listening)".

It was voted number 943 in Colin Larkin's All Time Top 1000 Albums 3rd Edition (2000).

== Track listing ==
All songs written by Kevin Ayers

=== Side one ===
1. "May I?" – (4:01)
2. "Rheinhardt & Geraldine/Colores Para Dolores" – (5:41)
3. "Lunatics Lament" – (4:53)
4. "Pisser Dans un Violon" – (8:02)

=== Side two ===
1. "The Oyster and the Flying Fish" – (2:37)
2. "Underwater" – (3:54)
3. "Clarence in Wonderland" – (2:06)
4. "Red Green and You Blue" – (3:52)
5. "Shooting at the Moon" – (5:53)

=== Track listing 2003 CD reissue ===
1. "May I?" – 4:01
2. "Rheinhardt & Geraldine/Colores Para Dolores" – 5:41
3. "Lunatics Lament" – 4:53
4. "Pisser Dans un Violon" – 8:02
5. "The Oyster and the Flying Fish" – 2:37
6. "Underwater" – 3:54
7. "Clarence in Wonderland" – 2:06
8. "Red Green and You Blue" – 3:52
9. "Shooting at the Moon" – 5:53
10. "Gemini Child" – 3:16
11. "Puis Je?" – 3:41
12. "Butterfly Dance" – 3:45
13. "Jolie Madame" – 2:26
14. "Hat" – 5:27

== Personnel ==
=== Musicians ===
- Kevin Ayers – guitar, bass, vocals

=== The Whole World ===
- David Bedford – organ, piano, accordion, marimbaphone, guitar
- Lol Coxhill – saxophone, zoblophone
- Mike Oldfield – bass, guitar and vocal
- Mick Fincher – drums, percussion, bottles & ashtrays
- The Whole World Chorus – backing vocals

=== Additional musicians ===
- Bridget St. John – vocals ("The Oyster And The Flying Fish")
- Robert Wyatt – vocals ("Colores Para Dolores")

=== Technical ===
- Peter Jenner – producer
- Peter Mews – engineer
- Tom Fu – cover
