= Whatevershebringswesing =

Studio album by Kevin Ayers
- Released: November 1971
- Recorded: March–August 1971
- Studios: Abbey Road Studios, London
- Length: 36.09
- Label: Harvest
- Producers: Kevin Ayers, Andrew King

Kevin Ayers chronology
Shooting at the Moon (1970)	Whatevershebringswesing (1971)	Bananamour (1973)

Singles from Whatevershebringswesing
- 1. "Stranger in Blue Suede Shoes" Released: 27 August 1971

Professional ratings
Review scores
Source	Rating
AllMusic	4.5/5 stars

Whatevershebringswesing is the third solo album by Kevin Ayers, on Harvest Records.

== Background ==
In 1971 Kevin Ayers started recording what would become his most acclaimed album, Whatevershebringswesing accompanied by members of Gong and his previous backing band the Whole World. Praised by NME, Record Mirror and Rolling Stone, the album realized all the musical aspirations Ayers had harboured since the inception of Soft Machine.

As with most Ayers albums, a collision of disparate styles confronts the listener but in this instance they work to extremely powerful effect. The title track with Mike Oldfield's guitar accompaniment and Robert Wyatt's wracked harmonies would become a template for Ayers subsequent '70s output.

The album opens with "There Is Loving/Among Us" accompanied by David Bedford's dramatic orchestral arrangement. There follow the vignettes "Margaret" and "Oh My" where Ayers juxtaposes terse lyrics against measured backing. "Song from the Bottom of a Well" marries an explosive arrangement, again featuring Oldfield, to Ayers' cryptic lyric "This is a song from the bottom of a well / There are things down here / I've got to try and tell". The title track is notable for Oldfield's extended bass solo at the beginning, while "Stranger in Blue Suede Shoes", a flirtation with Ayers' love of early rock and roll, would become a staple of his live set for years to come, a song he would re-record twice that decade.

Many critics and fans have cited Whatevershebringswesing as their favourite Ayers album and it remains to this day a best seller in his catalogue.

== Track listing ==
All tracks are written by Kevin Ayers except "Among Us" by David Bedford and "Champagne Cowboy Blues" by Mike Oldfield

No.	Title	Length
1.	"There is Loving/Among Us/There is Loving"	7:22
2.	"Margaret"	3:20
3.	"Oh My"	2:59
4.	"Song from the Bottom of a Well"	4:37
5.	"Whatevershebringswesing"	8:13
6.	"Stranger in Blue Suede Shoes"	3:24
7.	"Champagne Cowboy Blues"	3:56
8.	"Lullaby"	2:14

2003 reissue bonus tracks
No.	Title	Length
9.	"Stars" (B-side to "Stranger...")	3:32
10.	"Don't Sing No More Sad Songs"	3:46
11.	"Fake Mexican Tourist Blues" (1976 B-side to "Stranger...")	4:38
12.	"Stranger in Blue Suede Shoes" (early mix; previously unreleased)	3:19

== Personnel ==
=== Musicians ===
- Kevin Ayers – vocals, guitar, bass (track 6)
- David Bedford – keyboards, orchestral arrangements
- Mike Oldfield – bass (tracks 1, 3–5), guitar (tracks 5, 7, 9)
- Dave Dufort – drums (tracks 1, 4–5)
- William Murray – percussion (tracks 2–3, 7)
- Tony Carr – drums (tracks 6, 12)
- Robert Wyatt – harmony vocals (track 5)
- Didier Malherbe – saxophone (track 1), flute (track 8)
- Gerry Fields – violin (track 3)
- Johnny Van Derrick – violin (tracks 2, 7)
- Bruce Malamut – flugelhorns (track 1), incidental brass (tracks 1–2, 5–6, 8, 12), assistant engineer (tracks 1–2)

=== Technical ===
- Andrew King – producer
- Kevin Ayers – producer
- Peter Mews – engineer
- John Barrett – engineer
- Adrian Boot – design
- Adrian Lyne – photography
