= The Confessions of Dr. Dream and Other Stories =

Studio album by Kevin Ayers
- Released: May 1974
- Recorded: February–March 1974
- Studios: AIR, London; Ramport, London
- Genres: Rock, art rock
- Length: 41:20
- Label: Island
- Producer: Rupert Hine

Kevin Ayers chronology
Bananamour (1973)	The Confessions of Dr. Dream and Other Stories (1974)	June 1, 1974 (1974)

Professional ratings
Review scores
Source	Rating
AllMusic	2/5 stars
Head Heritage	5/5 stars
BBC	(positive)
Tom Hull	B+

The Confessions of Dr. Dream and Other Stories is the fifth studio album by Kevin Ayers. Ayers moved to Island Records for this release which employed a vast array of session musicians. The album also marked the arrival of Patto guitarist Ollie Halsall, who would become a constant musical partner for Ayers. Other notable musicians are ex-King Crimson drummer Michael Giles, and Steve Nye and Simon Jeffes of the Penguin Cafe Orchestra. The album was critically acclaimed on release with the NME's Nick Kent describing it as "Ayers' most formidable recorded work to date". The album features many of Ayers' most accessible songs and arrangements.

== Track listing ==
All tracks composed by Kevin Ayers

Side one
No.	Title	Length
1.	"Day By Day"	3:49
2.	"See You Later"	0:28
3.	"Didn't Feel Lonely Till I Thought of You"	4:10
4.	"Everybody's Sometime And Some People's All the Time Blues"	3:05
5.	"It Begins With a Blessing/Once I Awakened/But It Ends With a Curse"	8:19
6.	"Ballbearing Blues"	0:55

Side two
No.	Title	Length
7.	"The Confessions of Doctor Dream, Part 1: Irreversible Neural Damage"	4:44
8.	"The Confessions of Doctor Dream, Part 2: Invitation"	1:12
9.	"The Confessions of Doctor Dream, Part 3: The One Chance Dance"	7:49
10.	"The Confessions of Doctor Dream, Part 4: Doctor Dream Theme"	5:12
11.	"Two Goes Into Four"	1:38

2009 CD reissue bonus tracks
No.	Title	Track source	Length
12.	"Another Whimsical Song"	BBC Maida Vale studio, 7 July 1974	0:24
13.	"The Lady Rachel"	BBC Maida Vale studio, 7 July 1974	3:53
14.	"Stop this Train"	BBC Maida Vale studio, 7 July 1974	6:14
15.	"Didn't Feel Lonely 'til I Thought of You"	BBC Maida Vale studio, 7 July 1974	4:36
16.	"The Up Song"	1973 non-album single	3:18
17.	"After the Show"	1974 non-album single	2:37
18.	"Thank You Very Much"	B-side of "After the Show"	3:01

== Personnel ==
=== Musicians ===
- Kevin Ayers – guitars, vocals; piano & organ (track 7)
- Mark Warner – electric guitar (tracks 1, 3, 5, 10), acoustic guitar (tracks 2, 7)
- Sam Mitchell – electric guitar (tracks 1, 3–4)
- Ollie Halsall – electric guitar solo (track 3)
- Cal Batchelor – electric guitar (track 4)
- Mike Oldfield – electric guitar solo (track 4)
- John Perry – bass (tracks 1–3, 5)
- John Gustafson – bass (track 8)
- Trevor Jones – bass (track 9)
- Michael Giles – drums (tracks 1–3, 5, 7–10)
- The G'Deevy Ensemble – percussion (track 1)
- Ray Cooper – percussion (tracks 2, 9)
- Henry Crallan – piano (track 4)
- Rupert Hine – keyboards (tracks 5–10)
- Mike Moran – piano (track 5)
- Steve Nye – organ (track 5), electric piano (track 8)
- Mike Ratledge – organ (track 9)
- Lol Coxhill – alto saxophone (track 5)
- Nico – vocals (track 7)
- Doris Troy, Rosetta Hightower, Joanne Williams – backing vocals (tracks 1, 3)
- Sean Milligan – backing vocals (track 2)
- Hulloo Choir – backing vocals (tracks 5, 10)

=== Technical ===
- Rupert Hine – producer
- John Punter – engineer
- Steve Nye – engineer
- Gerry Leitch, Sean Milligan – assistant engineer
- Simon Jeffes – additional brass arrangements
- George Smith, James Wedge – illustration
