= Deià...Vu =

Studio album by Kevin Ayers
- Released: March 1984
- Recorded: December 1980
- Studio: Estudios Maller, Palma de Mallorca, Spain
- Genre: Rock
- Length: 31:11
- Label: Blau
- Producer: Kevin Ayers & Joan Bibiloni

Kevin Ayers chronology
Diamond Jack and the Queen of Pain (1983)	Deià...Vu (1984)	As Close As You Think (1986)

Singles from Deia...Vu
- 1. "My Speeding Heart" Released: July 1983

Professional ratings
Review scores
Source	Rating
AllMusic	2.5/5 stars

Deià...Vu is the eleventh studio album by Kevin Ayers, recorded in December 1980 and released in Spain after a remix in August 1984. It was recorded at Estudios Maller, Palma de Mallorca, with Ayers' local backing band led by Joan Bibiloni, and includes his musical partner Ollie Halsall. The title refers to the Spanish village Deià, Mallorca.

== Track listing ==
1. "Champagne and Valium" (Kevin Ayers) – 5:18
2. "Thank God for a Sense of Humor" (Ayers) – 3:52
3. "Take It Easy" (Ayers) – 2:59
4. "Stop Playing with My Heart (You Are a Big Girl)" (Ayers) – 3:33
5. "My Speeding Heart" (Ayers) – 2:59
6. "Lay Lady Lay" (Bob Dylan) – 5:00
7. "Stop Playing With My Heart II" (Ayers) – 2:47
8. "Be Aware of the Dog" (Ayers) – 4:49

== Personnel ==
=== Musicians ===
- Kevin Ayers – lead vocals, guitar
- Joan Bibiloni – guitars
- Ollie Halsall – bass, guitar (7)
- Daniel Lagarde – bass
- Quique Villafania – drums
- Miguel Figuerola – drums
- Zanna Gregmar – keyboards, backing vocals
- Jorge Pardo – saxophone
- Linda Novit – backing vocals

=== Technical ===
- Kevin Ayers – producer
- Joan Bibiloni – producer
- Reinaldo Costantini – engineer
- Olaguer Armengol – photography
