= Joy of a Toy =

Studio album by Kevin Ayers
- Released: November 1969
- Recorded: 17 June – 11 September 1969
- Studio: Abbey Road Studios, London
- Genre: Psychedelic pop; progressive rock
- Length: 41:38
- Label: Harvest
- Producer: Kevin Ayers & Peter Jenner

Kevin Ayers chronology
Joy of a Toy (1969)	Shooting at the Moon (1970)

Joy of a Toy is the debut solo album of Kevin Ayers, a founding member of Soft Machine. He is accompanied on the LP by pianist and arranger David Bedford as well as his former Soft Machine colleagues Robert Wyatt and Mike Ratledge, and his eventual replacement Hugh Hopper, who had previously worked with him in the semi-pro band Wilde Flowers. Among the session musicians are cellist and arranger Paul Buckmaster, jazz bassist Jeff Clyne, oboist Paul Minns (of Third Ear Band) and drummer Rob Tait (formerly of Pete Brown and His Battered Ornaments before going on to join Vinegar Joe).

== Background ==
After a Soft Machine tour of the US with the Jimi Hendrix Experience, Ayers had decided to retire from the music business. Hendrix, however, presented Ayers with an acoustic Gibson J-200 guitar on the condition that he continue his songwriting. Ayers repaired to a small London flat where he composed and arranged a whole LP which was then presented to Malcolm Jones' fledgling Harvest label, where it was produced by Peter Jenner for £4,000.

Joy of a Toy featured many of Ayers' most enduring songs from "The Lady Rachel" to "Girl on a Swing", the latter still regularly covered by artists to this day such as Candie Payne and The Ladybug Transistor. It was on Joy that Ayers developed his sonorous vocal delivery, an avant-garde song construction and an affection for unusual instrumentation, that would have a deep influence far into the 1970s and up to the end of his career. He was assisted in this latter undertaking by David Bedford, who provided the musical arrangements for the album as well as playing piano and other keyboards.

For the recording of Syd Barrett's first solo album The Madcap Laughs, Soft Machine were brought in to do overdubs for a few of Barrett's tracks. It was during this time that Barrett recorded a guitar part for the track "Religious Experience", (later titled "Singing a Song in the Morning"); this version was not released until the 2003 reissue of Joy.

== Response ==
Professional ratings
Review scores
Source	Rating
AllMusic	3.5/5 stars
The Encyclopedia of Popular Music	5/5 stars
Rolling Stone	4/5 stars
The Times	5/5 stars

== Track listing ==
All tracks are written by Kevin Ayers.

Side one
No.	Title	Length
1.	"Joy of a Toy Continued"	2:53
2.	"Town Feeling"	4:51
3.	"The Clarietta Rag"	3:20
4.	"Girl on a Swing"	2:49
5.	"Song for Insane Times"	4:01

Side two
No.	Title	Length
1.	"Stop This Train (Again Doing it)"	6:06
2.	"Eleanor's Cake (Which Ate Her)"	2:53
3.	"The Lady Rachel"	5:17
4.	"Oleh Oleh Bandu Bandong"	5:35
5.	"All This Crazy Gift of Time"	3:53
Total length:		41:38

Bonus tracks (2003 reissue)
No.	Title	Length
11.	"Religious Experience (Singing a Song in the Morning)" (take 9, previously unreleased)	4:46
12.	"The Lady Rachel" (extended first mix, previously unreleased)	6:42
13.	"Soon Soon Soon"	3:23
14.	"Religious Experience (Singing a Song in the Morning)" (take 103, featuring Syd Barrett, previously unreleased)	2:51
15.	"The Lady Rachel" (single version)	4:51
16.	"Singing a Song in the Morning" (single version)	2:55
Total length:		1:07:06

== Personnel ==
=== Musicians ===
- Kevin Ayers – guitars, bass, melodica, harmonica, vocals
- Robert Wyatt – drums
- David Bedford – piano, mellotron, arranger
- Mike Ratledge – organ
- Hugh Hopper – bass (1 and 5)
- Paul Buckmaster – cello
- Jeff Clyne – double bass (2 and 7)
- Rob Tait – drums (tracks 6 and 9)
- Paul Minns – oboe

=== Additional musicians on tracks 11, 14 & 16 ===
- Syd Barrett – guitar (track 14 only)
- Richard Sinclair – bass
- Richard Coughlan – drums
- David Sinclair – organ
- The Ladybirds – backing vocals

Shortly after Barrett's death, Ayers told Mojo magazine that when Barrett arrived at the studio: "....he was out-of-it....wasn't able to tune his guitar or find the chords". A third guitar is present on track 14 [take 103], most noticeably at 0:54–1:03, 1:37–1:42 and 2:34–2:51.

=== Technical ===
- Kevin Ayers – producer
- Peter Jenner – producer
- Peter Mew – engineer
- Laurie Asprey – photography
