= Bananamour =

Studio album by Kevin Ayers
- Released: May 1973
- Recorded: September–October 1972
- Studio: Abbey Road Studios, London
- Length: 35:48
- Label: Harvest (UK); Sire (USA)
- Producer: Kevin Ayers; Andrew King

Kevin Ayers chronology
Whatevershebringswesing (1971)	Bananamour (1973)	The Confessions of Dr. Dream and Other Stories (1974)

Singles from Bananamour
- 1. "Oh! Wot A Dream" Released: November 10, 1972

Professional ratings
Review scores
Source	Rating
AllMusic	3.5/5 stars

Bananamour is the fourth studio album by Kevin Ayers and it featured some of his most accessible recordings, including "Shouting in a Bucket Blues" and his whimsical tribute to Syd Barrett, "Oh! Wot A Dream". After Whatevershebringswesing, Ayers assembled a new band anchored by drummer Eddie Sparrow and bassist Archie Legget and employed a more direct lyricism. The centrepiece of the album is "Decadence", his withering portrait of Nico: "Watch her out there on display / Dancing in her sleepy way / While all her visions start to play / On the icicles of our decay / And all along the desert shore / She wanders further evermore / The only thing that's left to try / She says to live I have to die." The song was later covered by the Australian psychedelic rock band The Church on their 1999 album A Box of Birds. The album was remastered to vinyl (no bonus tracks) in gatefold packaging in 2025; distributed by Esoteric Recordings.

The album marked the end of Ayers' first Harvest Records series.

== Track listing ==
All songs written by Kevin Ayers

Side one
No.	Title	Length
1.	"Don't Let It Get You Down (For Rachel)"	3:58
2.	"Shouting in a Bucket Blues"	3:44
3.	"When Your Parents Go to Sleep"	5:46
4.	"Interview"	4:44
5.	"Internotional Anthem"	0:40

Side two
No.	Title	Length
6.	"Decadence"	8:02
7.	"Oh! Wot A Dream"	2:48
8.	"Hymn"	4:34
9.	"Beware of the Dog"	1:20

2003 CD reissue bonus tracks
No.	Title	Length
10.	"Connie On a Rubber Band"	2:56
11.	"Decadence" (Early Mix)"	6:57
12.	"Take Me to Tahiti"	3:37
13.	"Caribbean Moon"	3:02

== Personnel ==
=== Musicians ===
- Kevin Ayers – guitar, vocals
- Archie Legget – bass, harmony vocals, lead vocal (track 3)
- Eddie Sparrow – drums

=== Additional musicians ===
- Steve Hillage – lead guitar (track 2, track 6)
- Mike Ratledge – organ (track 4)
- Robert Wyatt – harmony vocal (track 8)
- David Bedford – orchestral arrangement (track 9)
- Howie Casey – tenor saxophone
- Dave Caswell – trumpet
- Tristan Fry – cymbal
- Lyle Jenkins – baritone saxophone
- Ronnie Price – piano
- Barry St. John, Liza Strike, Doris Troy – backing vocals

=== Technical ===
- Kevin Ayers – producer
- Andrew King – producer
- John Kurlander – engineer
- Bob Lawrie – cover art
- Richard Imrie – photography
