= Daevid Allen =

Australian musician (1938–2015)

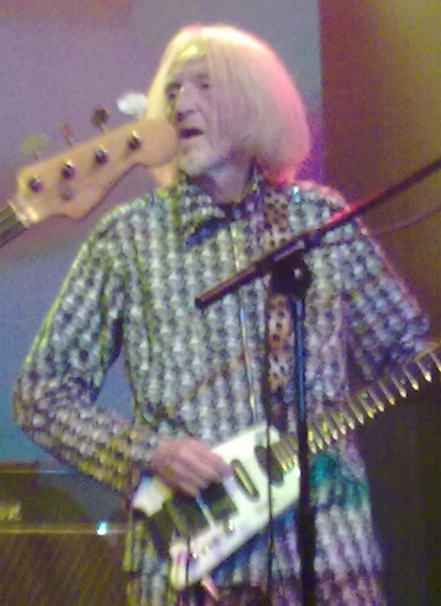
- Allen with Gong at HMV Forum, London in 2009

Background information
- Also known as: Divided Alien; Bert Camembert; Dingo Virgin; Ja Am
- Born: Christopher David Allen; 13 January 1938; Melbourne, Australia
- Died: 13 March 2015 (aged 77) Australia
- Genres: Canterbury scene; psychedelic rock; space rock; jazz rock; psychedelic folk; performance poetry
- Occupation: Musician
- Instruments: Guitar; vocals; bass
- Years active: 1960–2015
- Formerly of: Soft Machine; Gong
- Website: daevidallen.com

Christopher David "Daevid" Allen (13 January 1938 – 13 March 2015) was an Australian musician. He was co-founder of the Canterbury scene groups Soft Machine (in the UK, 1966) and Gong (in France, 1967).

== Biography ==
=== Early years ===
He was born in Melbourne to Walter and Helen Allen, and is of English descent. His father was a director in a furniture business and played piano. In 1960, inspired by the Beat Generation writers he had discovered while working in a Melbourne bookshop, Allen travelled to Paris, where he stayed at the Beat Hotel, moving into a room recently vacated by Allen Ginsberg and Peter Orlovsky. While selling the International Herald Tribune around Le Chat Qui Pêche and the Latin Quarter, he met Terry Riley and also gained free access to the jazz clubs in the area.

In 1961 Allen travelled to England and rented a room at Lydden, near Dover, where he soon began to look for work as a musician. After meeting up with William S. Burroughs, and inspired by philosophies of Sun Ra, he formed free jazz outfit the Daevid Allen Trio ('Daevid' having been adopted as an affectation of David), which included his landlord's son, 16-year-old Robert Wyatt. They performed at Burroughs' theatre pieces based on the novel The Ticket That Exploded. In 1966, together with Kevin Ayers and Mike Ratledge, they formed the band Soft Machine, the name having come from the Burroughs novel The Soft Machine. Ayers and Wyatt had previously played in Wilde Flowers.

Following a tour of Europe in August 1967, Allen was refused re-entry to the UK because he had overstayed his visa on a prior visit. He returned to Paris where he formed Gong along with his partner Gilli Smyth. They also formed the Bananamoon Band. Both projects were cut short as the two took part in the 1968 Paris protests which swept the city, although Allen admitted that he was scorned by the other protesters for being a beatnik. Fleeing the police, they made their way to Deià, Mallorca, where they had lived for a time in 1966 and met the poet Robert Graves, a friend of Robert Wyatt's family.

Returning to Paris in August 1969, they were offered the chance to make an album by the BYG Actuel label and so formed a new Gong band and recorded Magick Brother, released in March 1970.

=== 1970s ===
In 1971 Allen recorded and released his first solo album, Banana Moon (sometimes spelled Bananamoon) for BYG Actuel. It did not feature his original 1968 Bananamoon Band rhythm section, but did feature Robert Wyatt, Gilli Smyth, Gary Wright, Pip Pyle, Maggie Bell and many others. Gong's lineup stabilized with Pip Pyle (drums) joining Daevid Allen (guitar & vocals), Gilli Smyth (vocals), Christian Tritsch (bass) and Didier Malherbe (woodwinds). This group performed on the soundtrack to the film Continental Circus, poet Dashiell Hedayat's Obsolete and Gong's nominal second studio album, Camembert Electrique.

In October, Allen, Smyth and the rest of Gong moved into an abandoned 12-room hunting lodge called Pavilion du Hay, near Voisines and Sens, 120 km south-east Paris. They would be based there until early 1974. In late 1972 they were joined by electronic musician Tim Blake. Later Steve Hillage and Pierre Moerlen also joined to record the Radio Gnome Invisible trilogy which consisted of Flying Teapot, Angel's Egg and You. The band signed with Virgin Records in 1973 after BYG Records went bankrupt during recording of Flying Teapot at Richard Branson's Manor Studio. Gong was Branson's second Virgin release after Mike Oldfield's Tubular Bells. According to Allen, in his book Gong Dreaming 2, the idea of the flying teapot was influenced by Russell's teapot.

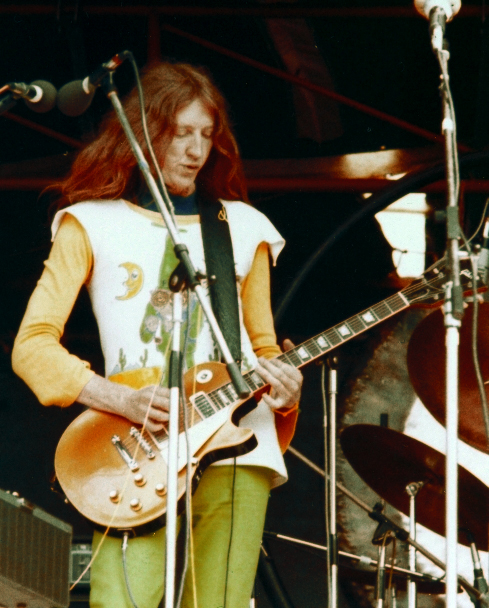
Allen performing in Hyde Park, London, 1974

Allen left Gong in April 1975 and went on to record three more solo albums, Good Morning (1976), Now Is the Happiest Time of Your Life (1977) and N'existe pas! (1979). During these years, he lived in a hippie collective in Deià and contributed to the production of The Book of Am, an album by the band Can am des puig, loaning them a four-track TEAC reel-to-reel tape recorder.

In late May 1977, Allen performed and recorded as Planet Gong, then reformed the "Radio Gnome Trilogy" version of the group for a one-off show at the Hippodrome, Paris, France. The show, the first Gong Reunion, featured Sting, Stewart Copeland and Andy Summers in their first live appearance as part of Mike Howlett's band Strontium 90, before Summers joined both Copeland and Sting in The Police. An edited version of the Gong concert was released later in 1977 as the double live album Gong est Mort, Vive Gong.

In 1978 Allen moved to New York at the invitation of his old producer Giorgio Gomelsky, and was teamed up with the nascent Material to form the punk-influenced New York Gong. They toured the US in the Spring of 1979, playing the classic Radio Gnome Invisible trilogy, and later recorded the studio album About Time.

=== 1980s and 1990s ===
In 1981 Allen returned to Australia, taking up residence in Byron Bay where he worked on performance pieces and poetry. He performed with performance artist David Tolley as Ex (not to be confused with the Dutch punk band The Ex), using tape loops and drum machines.

In 1989 he formed a new Gong band, Gongmaison, which toured and recorded a self-titled album. Reverting to the name Gong, they released Shapeshifter in 1992, which continued the classic Gong mythology of Zero the Hero.

A second Gong Reunion event took place in London in 1994 and the "classic" lineup toured between 1996 and 2001, releasing a new studio album, Zero to Infinity in 2000.

In 1996 he made a guest appearance on the track "Chant of the Twisted Mystics" on the album "Escape From Awkward Caucasia" by Byron Bay psychedelic / space rock band Freaks of Nature.

In 1998 Allen co-founded the San Francisco-based psychedelic rock band University of Errors and the UK-based jazz rock band Brainville 3, going on to record several studio and live albums with each. He also recorded with Spirits Burning, a space rock supergroup whose members include Alan Davey, Bridget Wishart, Karl E. H. Seigfried, and Simon House. Some of Daevid Allen's most experimental work was with the long running Los Angeles noise band Big City Orchestra, including live performances and more than a half dozen CD releases.

Other projects around this time included the Invisible Opera Company of Tibet and the Magick Brothers.

=== 2000s ===
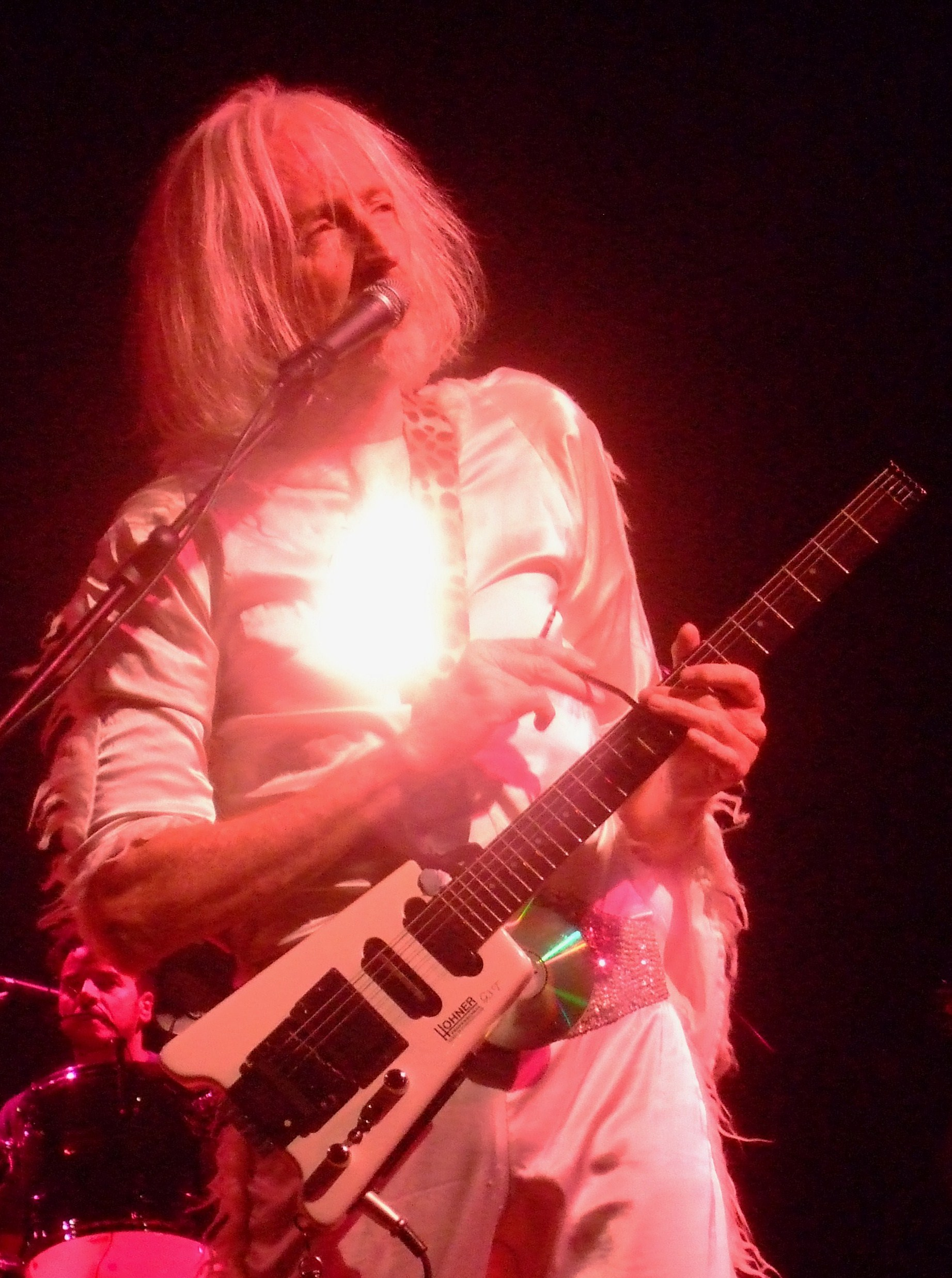
Allen performing with Gong at Zafferana, Sicily, 2009

A project with his son, Orlando, and members of Acid Mothers Temple led to Acid Mothers Gong and the 2004 album Acid Motherhood, as well as an improvisation outfit entitled Guru And Zero.

In November 2006 a Gong Family Unconvention was held in Amsterdam, which included a reunion of many former Gong members from the "classic" early 70s line-up. Further Gong concerts were held in London in June 2008, featuring many of the same line-up, including Allen himself, Gilli Smyth, Steve Hillage, Miquette Giraudy, and Mike Howlett.

In November 2007, Allen held a series of concerts in Brazil, with a branch of Gong, which was called Daevid Allen and Gong Global Family (Allen on vocals and guitar, Josh Pollock on guitar, megaphone and percussion; Fred Barley on drums and percussion, Fabio Golfetti on guitar, Gabriel Costa on bass, Marcelo Ringel on flute and tenor saxophone), along with his other band University of Errors (Allen, Pollock, Michael Clare and Barley). The concerts took place in São Paulo on 21 and 22 November and São Carlos on 24 November. These musicians, minus Marcelo, recorded some new songs at studio Mosh, in São Paulo. The São Paulo concert of 21 November was then released only as a DVD (UK only) and as a CD by Voiceprint Records.

The 2009 album 2032 featured the band's drummer since 1999, Chris Taylor, formerly of Roachford and Soul II Soul. Allen's son Orlando replaced Taylor in 2012.

In 2013, in Devon, England, Allen performed solo material and poetry at an event entitled "Up Close with Daevid Allen". He also joined The Invisible Opera Company of Tibet (UK) on stage to perform songs, including the Gong song "Tried So Hard" – a live recording of which appeared on the band's single, along with a studio version with Allen on vocals.

His final studio album with Gong, I See You, produced by his son Orlando, was released in November 2014.

The same year, he worked on Book of Intxixu, the second Can am des puig album, and New Start by Belgian musician Will Z., a tribute album to Deià musicians, the first posthumous album of Daevid Allen and Carmeta Mansilla, singer of Can am des puig.

=== Illness and death ===
On 12 June 2014, Allen underwent surgery to remove a cyst from his neck. It was determined to be cancerous and he subsequently underwent radiation therapy. In a statement, released on 5 February 2015, Allen wrote that the cancer had returned to his neck and also spread to his lungs, and that he was "not interested in endless surgical operations". He was "given approximately six months to live".

On 13 March 2015, his son, Orlando Monday Allen, announced through Facebook that Daevid Allen had died. The Planet Gong website announced that Allen had died in Australia, at 1.05pm, "surrounded by his boys". Allen had four sons, two with Gilli Smyth and two with other mothers.

Reviewing Allen's life, The Daily Telegraph said:

Allen revelled in being the court jester of hippie rock and never lost his enthusiasm for the transcendent power of the psychedelic experience. He once remarked: "Psychedelia for me is a code for that profound spiritual experience where there is a direct link to the gods." That he never attained the riches and fame of many of his contemporaries did not concern him.

== Discography ==
=== With Gong ===
- Magick Brother (1970)
- Camembert Electrique (1971)
- Continental Circus (1972, soundtrack)
- Flying Teapot (1973)
- Angel's Egg (1973)
- You (1974)
- Shapeshifter (1992)
- Zero to Infinity (2000)
- Acid Motherhood (2004)
- 2032 (2009)
- I See You (2014)
- Rejoice! I'm Dead! (posthumous contributions, 2016)

=== Solo & with others ===
1960s

- 1963: Live 1963 (with The Daevid Allen Trio, first released 1993)
- 1967: "Love Makes Sweet Music" b/w "Feelin' Reelin' Squeelin'" (debut single of Soft Machine)
- 1967: Faces & Places, Vol. 7, AKA Jet-Propelled Photographs (demos with Soft Machine, first released 1972)
- 1967: Turns On, Volume 1 (with Soft Machine, Allen appears on 4 demo tracks, first released 2001)

1970s

- 1971: Obsolete Dashiell Hedayat & Gong
- 1971: Banana Moon
- 1973: Gong on Acid 73 (BMO Vol. 16, with Gong, released 2006)
- 1976: Good Morning (with Euterpe)
- 1977: Now Is the Happiest Time of Your Life
- 1977: Studio Rehearsal Tapes 1977 (BMO Vol. 1, with Euterpe, released 2004)
- 1978: Mother (Gilli Smyth; Allen guests on a few tracks and produced the album)
- 1979: N'existe pas!

1980s

- 1980: Divided Alien Playbax 80 studio album with Bill Laswell
- 1980: Divided Alien Playbax: Live at The Missing In Cleveland (BMO Vol. 8, Disc 1, released 2004)
- 1980: Divided Alien Playbax: Live at The Missing In Cleveland (BMO Vol. 9, Disc 2, released 2004)
- 1981: Self Initiation (BMO Vol. 3, released 2004)
- 1982: Ex/Don't Stop (with David Tolley)
- 1984: Radio Art 1984 (BMO Vol. 14, released 2006)
- 1988: Live Spring '88: The Return
- 1989: The Owl and the Tree (with Mother Gong)

1990s

- 1990: Stroking the Tail of the Bird (with Gilli Smyth and Harry Williamson)
- 1990: Australia Aquaria
- 1990: Seven Drones
- 1990: The Australian Years
- 1990: Melbourne Studio Tapes (BMO Vol. 10, with Invisible Opera Company of Oz)
- 1992: Who's Afraid? (with Kramer)
- 1992: Live at the Witchwood 1991 (with Magick Brothers)
- 1992: Je ne Fum' pas des Bananes (unreleased early Daevid Allen/Bananamoon Band/Gong)
- 1993: 12 Selves (with Liz Van Dort)
- 1995: Hit Men (with Kramer)
- 1995: Dreamin' a Dream
- 1995: Bards of Byron Bay (BMO Vol. 4, with Russell Hibbs)
- 1998: Eat Me Baby I'm a Jellybean
- 1998: 22 Meanings (with Harry Williamson)
- 1998: Live in Glastonbury Town (BMO Vol. 11, with Magick Brothers)
- 1998: Solo @ The Axiom, Cheltenham '98 (BMO Vol. 15)
- 1999: Live in the UK (BMO Vol. 2, with Brainville)
- 1999: The Children's Crusade (with Brainville)
- 1999: Money Doesn't Make It (with University of Errors)

2000s

- 2001: Sacred Geometry (with Micro Cosmic)
- 2001: e²x10=Tenure (with University of Errors)
- 2001: Nectans Glen (with Russell Hibbs)
- 2002: Beauty the Basket Case (BMO Vol. 17, as Guru and Zero)
- 2002: One Who Whispers (with Cipher)
- 2002: Ugly Music For Monica (with University of Errors)
- 2004: Jet-Propelled Photographs (re-makes of early Soft Machine material, with University of Errors)
- 2004: Live in Chicago (with University of Errors)
- 2004: Makoto Mango (as Guru & Zero)
- 2004: Live @ the Knit NYC (BMO Vol. 6, with Nicoletta Stephanz)
- 2004: The Mystery Disque (BMO Vol. 7, with das)
- 2004: Altered States of Alien KWISP (BMO Vol. 13, with Altered Walter Funk)
- 2004: Gentle Genie (compilation 1985-1999)
- 2005: Sacred Geometry II (with Micro Cosmic)
- 2005: I Am Your Egg (with Gilli Smyth & Orlando Allen)
- 2005: DJDDAY (with Weird Biscuit Teatime; re-released in 2025 under the band name Weird Biscuit Teatime Starring Daevid Allen)
- 2006: Live at The Fleece, Bristol, England, 6th June 2003 (with University of Errors)
- 2006: Glissando Grooves (BMO Vol. 12, SFO Soundtribe 3, with Don Falcone)
- 2008: Trial by Headline (with Brainville 3)

2010s

- 2012: Soundbites 4 Tha Revelation (poetry)
- 2012: Live at the Roundhouse 1971 (with Gilli Smyth & Soft Machine)
- 2012: Live in San Francisco (with Magick Brothers)
- 2013: Tried So Hard (with The Invisible Opera Company of Tibet, UK)
- 2014: Stoned Innocent Frankenstein (alternative mixes & outtakes from Banana Moon)
- 2015: Elevenses (as The Daevid Allen Weird Quartet)
- 2017: The Roadmap in Your Heart b/w Another Roadmap in Your Head and An Ambient Heat (7-inch single, by Spirits Burning & Daevid Allen)

== Filmography ==
- 2015: Romantic Warriors III: Canterbury Tales (DVD)

== Bibliography ==
- 1994: Allen, Daevid, Gong Dreaming 1 (limited edition), GAS Publishing, No ISBN
- 2007: Allen, Daevid, Gong Dreaming 1 (2nd edition), SAF Publishing, ISBN 978-0-946719-82-2
- 2009: Allen, Daevid, Gong Dreaming 2, SAF Publishing, ISBN 978-0-946719-56-3
