= Stranger in Blue Suede Shoes =

Single by Kevin Ayers

from the album Whatevershebringswesing
- B-side: "Stars"
- Released: 27 August 1971
- Genre: Rock
- Label: Harvest
- Songwriter(s): Kevin Ayers
- Producer(s): Kevin Ayers, Andrew King

Kevin Ayers singles chronology
"Butterfly Dance" (1970)	"Stranger in Blue Suede Shoes" (1971)	"Oh! Wot a Dream" (1972)

1976 reissue
- 1976 reissue

"Stranger in Blue Suede Shoes" was a Kevin Ayers single release. The song was included on his classic 1971 album Whatevershebringswesing, released three months later. It would be re-released as a single in 1976 when Ayers re-signed to Harvest Records. The B-side, "Stars", was a non album track that would be later included on the 1976 compilation Odd Ditties.

== Track listing ==
Original release

1. "Stranger In Blue Suede Shoes" (Kevin Ayers)
2. "Stars" (Kevin Ayers)

1976 reissue

1. "Stranger In Blue Suede Shoes" (Kevin Ayers)
2. "Fake Mexican Tourist Blues" (Kevin Ayers)

== Personnel ==
- Kevin Ayers / vocals, (on "Stranger.."), vocals, bass (on "Stars")
- David Bedford / piano (on "Stranger.."), organ (on "Stars")
- Mike Oldfield / guitar (on "Stars"), guitar, bass (on "Stranger..)
- Dave Dufort / drums on "Stars"
- Tony Carr / drums on "Stranger.."
- The Ladybirds / backing vocals on "Stars"

== Live version ==
One live version of the song was released on the album June 1, 1974.

== 1976 reissue ==
To celebrate the return of Kevin Ayers to Harvest Records, in November 1976 the label reissued his 1971 neo-rockabilly single. This time the track was accompanied by another unreleased song from the Whatevershebringswesing sessions – "Fake Mexican Tourist Blues". This humorous track involves an unscrupulous Mexican trying to pair Ayers off with various members of his family; "Hey, brother, what about my mother / She's only just forty / She's especially naughty / She knows a lot a tricks / More than the younger chicks / And if you don't like my mother / I got a very nice brother." Both songs were included on a collection Harvest released that year of Ayers rarities and B-sides entitled Odd Ditties, which this single helped to promote.
