= The Black Crowes discography =

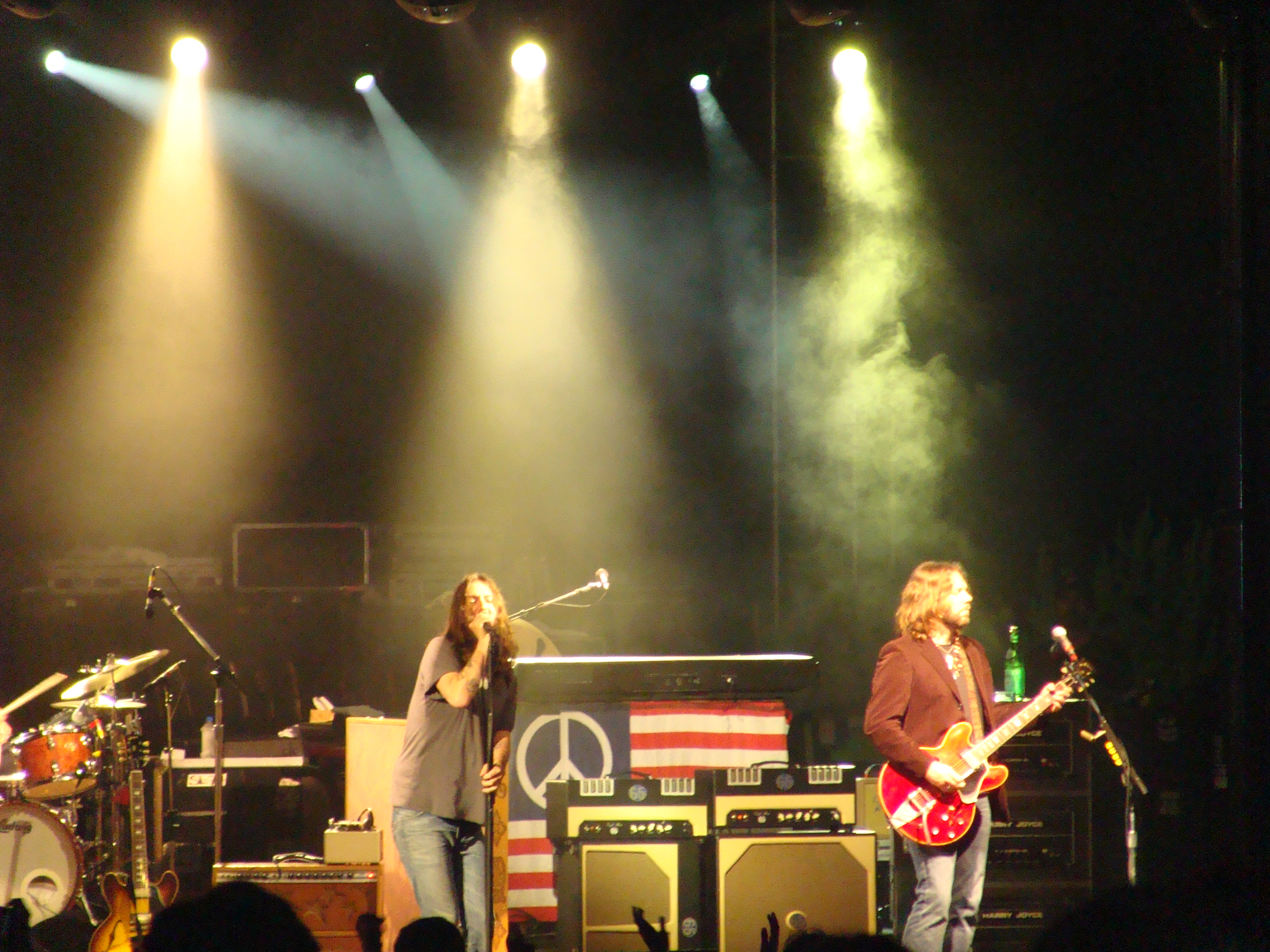
- The Black Crowes in 2009
- Studio albums: 11
- Extended plays: 2
- Live albums: 6
- Compilation albums: 3
- Singles: 27

This is a discography of the Black Crowes, an American hard rock/jam band formed in 1984 by Chris and Rich Robinson. Their first studio album, Shake Your Money Maker, was released in 1990. Helped by the singles "Twice as Hard", "Jealous Again", "Hard to Handle", "She Talks to Angels", and "Seeing Things", the album peaked at number four on the Billboard 200 and went five times platinum in the United States. "Hard to Handle" and "She Talks to Angels" both reached number one on the Hot Mainstream Rock Tracks chart.

In 1992, The Black Crowes released the studio album The Southern Harmony and Musical Companion, which reached number one on the Billboard 200 and went two times platinum in the US. It was the band's last album to go platinum. Four singles from the album ("Thorn in My Pride", "Sting Me", "Remedy", and "Hotel Illness") topped the Hot Mainstream Rock Tracks chart, bringing the band's overall total to six.

The Black Crowes released three more studio albums that decade: Amorica in 1994, Three Snakes and One Charm in 1996, and By Your Side in 1999. Amorica was certified gold in the US. In 2000, they released the compilation album Greatest Hits 1990–1999: A Tribute to a Work in Progress... and the live album Live at the Greek. Their sixth studio album, Lions, was released in 2001. The live album Live was released in 2002.

From 2002 to 2005, The Black Crowes went on hiatus. Since re-forming, they have released three studio albums. 2008's Warpaint, and Before the Frost...Until the Freeze in 2009. They also released two live albums, and one compilation album. Warpaint peaked at number five on the Billboard 200 and was their first album to peak in the top ten since The Southern Harmony and Musical Companion.

They reformed again in 2019, but a tour that features a full performance of their debut album was postponed until 2021 due to COVID. In 2022, they released an EP, 1972 followed by the live album Shake Your Moneymaker Live in 2023.

== Albums ==
=== Studio albums ===
Year	Album details	Peak chart positions										Certifications (sales thresholds)
Year	Album details	US	CAN	AUS	NZ	SWE	GER	NOR	FRA	NLD	UK	Certifications (sales thresholds)
1990	Shake Your Money Maker: Release date: February 13, 1990; Label: Def American	4	4	43	4	48	—	—	—	61	36	RIAA: 5× Platinum; BPI: Silver; MC: Gold
1992	The Southern Harmony and Musical Companion: Release date: May 12, 1992; Label: Def American	1	2	6	4	17	30	9	—	17	2	RIAA: 2× Platinum; ARIA: Gold; MC: Platinum
1994	Amorica: Release date: November 1, 1994; Label: American	11	13	11	39	25	40	—	39	17	8	RIAA: Gold; BPI: Silver
1996	Three Snakes and One Charm: Released: July 23, 1996; Label: American	15	22	23	—	23	38	—	—	39	17	
1999	By Your Side: Release date: January 12, 1999; Label: Columbia	26	14	40	—	11	28	23	71	46	34	
2001	Lions: Release date: May 7, 2001; Label: V2	20	20	74	—	51	66	—	141	—	37	
2008	Warpaint: Release date: March 3, 2008; Label: Silver Arrow	5	12	70	—	50	71	—	96	24	52	
2009	Before the Frost...Until the Freeze: Release date: September 1, 2009; Label: Silver Arrow	12	—	167	—	59	—	—	92	51	47	
2010	Croweology: Release date: August 3, 2010; Label: Silver Arrow	13	—	—	—	—	98	—	—	80	—	
2024	Happiness Bastards: Released: March 15, 2024; Label: Silver Arrow	97	—	107	—	—	18	—	—	29	31	
2026	A Pound of Feathers: Release date: March 13, 2026; Label: Silver Arrow	—	—	34	—	—	21	—	—	70	37	
"—" denotes releases that did not chart

=== Live albums and videos ===
Year	Album details	Peak chart positions									Certifications (sales threshold)
Year	Album details	US	US Indie	NZ	NLD	FRA	GER	ITA	FIN	AUS	Certifications (sales threshold)
1995	In Concert: Release date: 1995; Label: BBC Radio International	—	—	—	—	—	—	—	—	—	
2000	Live at the Greek: Release date: 2000; Label: TVT	64	2	45	46	73	24	37	27	72	RIAA: Gold
2002	Live: Release date: August 20, 2002; Label: V2	137	—	—	—	130	—	—	—	179	
2006	Freak 'n' Roll...Into the Fog: Release date: March 12, 2006; Label: Eagle Rock	200	18	—	—	—	—	—	—	—	RIAA: Gold
2009	Warpaint Live: Release date: April 28, 2009; Label: Eagle Rock	—	37	—	—	—	—	—	—	—	
2013	Wiser for the Time: Release date: 2013; Label: Silver Arrow	—	—	—	—	—	—	—	—	—	
2023	Shake Your Moneymaker Live: Release date: 2023; Label: Silver Arrow	—	—	—	—	—	—	—	—	—	
"—" denotes releases that did not chart

=== Compilation albums ===
Year	Album details	Peak positions	
Year	Album details	US	AUS
1998	Sho' Nuff: Release date: August 11, 1998; Label: American	—	—
2000	Greatest Hits 1990–1999: A Tribute to a Work in Progress...: Release date: June 20, 2000; Label: American	143	178
2006	The Lost Crowes: Release date: September 26, 2006; Label: American	128	—
"—" denotes releases that did not chart

== EPs ==
Year	EP details
2017	Live at Jones Beach 2000 (Jimmy Page and The Black Crowes): Release date: April 22, 2017; Label: The Orchard
2022	1972: Release date: May 4, 2022; Label: Silver Arrow

== Singles ==
Year	Single	Peak chart positions										Album
Year	Single	US	US Pop	US Main.	US AAA	US Cash Box	AUS	CAN	NZ	NED	UK	Album
1990	"Jealous Again"	75	—	5	—	73	96	56	—	34	76	Shake Your Money Maker
1990	"Hard to Handle"	45	—	1	—	49	79	40	—	56	45	Shake Your Money Maker
1990	"Twice as Hard"	—	—	11	—	—	—	85	—	—	47	Shake Your Money Maker
1991	"She Talks to Angels"	30	26	1	—	31	44	26	21	—	70	Shake Your Money Maker
1991	"Hard to Handle" (re-issue)	26	19	—	—	21	—	45	—	—	39	Shake Your Money Maker
1991	"Seeing Things"	—	—	2	—	—	—	72	—	—	72	Shake Your Money Maker
1992	"Remedy"	48	33	1	—	35	21	28	6	19	24	The Southern Harmony and Musical Companion
1992	"Sting Me"	—	—	1	—	—	59	62	—	—	42	The Southern Harmony and Musical Companion
1992	"Thorn in My Pride"	80	37	1	—	77	—	34	—	—	—	The Southern Harmony and Musical Companion
1992	"Hotel Illness"	—	—	1	—	—	—	49	—	24	47	The Southern Harmony and Musical Companion
1993	"Sometimes Salvation" (US promo)	—	—	7	—	—	—	45	—	—	—	The Southern Harmony and Musical Companion
1993	"Bad Luck Blue Eyes Goodbye" (US promo)	—	—	40	—	—	—	—	—	—	—	The Southern Harmony and Musical Companion
1994	"A Conspiracy"	—	—	5	—	—	62	54	—	—	25	Amorica
1995	"High Head Blues"	—	—	8	—	—	111	50	—	—	25	Amorica
1995	"Wiser Time"	—	—	7	—	—	133	15	—	—	34	Amorica
1996	"One Mirror Too Many" (EUR only)	—	—	—	—	—	—	—	—	—	51	Three Snakes and One Charm
1996	"Good Friday"	—	—	3	9	—	—	8	—	—	—	Three Snakes and One Charm
1996	"Blackberry"	—	—	6	—	—	144	42	—	—	—	Three Snakes and One Charm
1996	"Better When You're Not Alone" (US promo)	—	—	—	—	—	—	62	—	—	—	Three Snakes and One Charm
1998	"Kickin' My Heart Around"	118	—	3	—	—	112	12	—	—	55	By Your Side
1998	"By Your Side" (EUR/JPN)	—	—	—	—	—	—	12	—	—	—	By Your Side
1999	"Only a Fool"	—	—	7	10	—	168	25	—	—	—	By Your Side
1999	"Go Faster" (US promo)	—	—	24	—	—	—	—	—	—	—	By Your Side
2001	"Soul Singing"	—	—	12	8	—	191	—	—	—	80	Lions
2001	"Lickin'"	—	—	9	—	—	—	—	—	—	—	Lions
2008	"Goodbye Daughters of the Revolution"	—	—	33	9	—	—	—	—	—	—	Warpaint
2008	"Wounded Bird"	—	—	—	—	—	—	—	—	—	—	Warpaint
2009	"I Ain't Hiding"	—	—	—	—	—	—	—	—	—	—	Before the Frost...Until the Freeze
2009	"Good Morning Captain"	—	—	30	—	—	—	—	—	—	—	Before the Frost...Until the Freeze
2021	"Charming Mess"	—	—	33	25	—	—	—	—	—	—	Shake Your Money Maker: 30th Anniversary
2021	"Jealous Guy"	—	—	—	—	—	—	—	—	—	—	Shake Your Money Maker: 30th Anniversary
2024	"Wanting and Waiting"	—	—	15	8	—	—	—	—	—	—	Happiness Bastards
2024	"Cross Your Fingers"	—	—	—	—	—	—	—	—	—	—	Happiness Bastards
2024	"Bedside Manners"	—	—	38	—	—	—	—	—	—	—	Happiness Bastards
2024	"Wilted Rose" (feat. Lainey Wilson)	—	—	—	29	—	—	—	—	—	—	Happiness Bastards
2026	"Profane Prophecy"	—	—	12	—	—	—	—	—	—	—	A Pound of Feathers
2026	"Pharmacy Chronicles"	—	—	—	14	—	—	—	—	—	—	A Pound of Feathers
2026	"It's Like That"	—	—	—	—	—	—	—	—	—	—	A Pound of Feathers
"—" denotes releases that did not chart

== Other appearances ==
Year	Song	Notes
2002	"Lucy in the Sky with Diamonds"	The Beatles cover, from the soundtrack of the 2001 film I Am Sam
2005	"Back Door Santa"	Clarence Carter cover, digital download
