= Greatest Hits 1990–1999: A Tribute to a Work in Progress... =

Greatest Hits 1990-1999: A Tribute to a Work in Progress...

Compilation album by The Black Crowes
- Released: June 20, 2000
- Genre: Hard rock, blues rock, Southern rock
- Length: 73:30
- Label: American; Columbia

The Black Crowes chronology
| Live at the Greek: Excess All Areas (2000) | Greatest Hits 1990-1999: A Tribute to a Work in Progress... (2000) | Lions (2001) |

The Black Crowes compilation chronology
| Sho' Nuff (1998) | Greatest Hits 1990-1999: A Tribute to a Work in Progress... (2000) | The Lost Crowes (2006) |

Professional ratings
Review scores
| Source | Rating |
|---|---|
| AllMusic | 4.5/5 stars |
| Melody Maker | 4/5 stars |
| NME | (7/10) |
| Q | 4/5 stars |
| The Rolling Stone Album Guide | 4/5 stars |

Greatest Hits 1990–1999: A Tribute to a Work in Progress... is a compilation album by American rock band The Black Crowes, released June 20, 2000, by American Recordings & Columbia Records. It features material from all of their studio albums up to that point, and reached #143 on the Billboard 200.

== Track listing ==
All tracks are written by Chris Robinson & Rich Robinson, except where noted.

| No. | Title | Writer(s) | Original album | Length |
|---|---|---|---|---|
| 1. | "Jealous Again" | | Shake Your Money Maker, 1990 | 4:34 |
| 2. | "Twice As Hard" | | Shake Your Money Maker | 4:09 |
| 3. | "Hard to Handle" | Otis Redding, Allen Jones, Alvertis Isbell | Shake Your Money Maker | 3:08 |
| 4. | "She Talks to Angels" | | Shake Your Money Maker | 5:29 |
| 5. | "Remedy" | | The Southern Harmony and Musical Companion, 1992 | 5:24 |
| 6. | "Sting Me" | | The Southern Harmony and Musical Companion | 4:41 |
| 7. | "Thorn in My Pride" | | The Southern Harmony and Musical Companion | 6:05 |
| 8. | "Bad Luck Blue Eyes Goodbye" | | The Southern Harmony and Musical Companion | 6:30 |
| 9. | "A Conspiracy" | | Amorica, 1994 | 4:46 |
| 10. | "Wiser Time" | | Amorica | 5:33 |
| 11. | "Good Friday" | | Three Snakes and One Charm, 1996 | 3:51 |
| 12. | "Blackberry" | | Three Snakes and One Charm | 3:26 |
| 13. | "Kickin' My Heart Around" | | By Your Side, 1999 | 3:41 |
| 14. | "Go Faster" | | By Your Side | 4:03 |
| 15. | "Only a Fool" | | By Your Side | 3:44 |
| 16. | "By Your Side" | | By Your Side | 4:28 |

== Personnel ==
The Black Crowes

- Jeff Cease – guitar (1–4)
- Johnny Colt – bass guitar (1–12)
- Marc Ford – guitar (5–12)
- Steve Gorman – drums (all tracks)
- Eddie Harsch – keyboards (except 1–4)
- Sven Pipien – bass guitar (13–16)
- Chris Robinson – vocals (all tracks), blues harp (12 & 13)
- Rich Robinson – guitar (all tracks)

Uncredited musicians

- Chuck Leavell – piano, organ (1–4)

Production

- The Black Crowes – production (except 1–4, 13–16)
- George Drakoulias – production (1–8)
- Jack Joseph Puig – production (9–12)
- Kevin Shirley – production (13–16)
- Leon Zervos – mastering
- Pete Angelus – personal management
- James Diener & Mark Feldman – project management
- Josh Cheuse – art direction

== Charts ==
Weekly Charts

| Chart (2000) | Peak Position |
|---|---|
| US Billboard 200 | 143 |
