= List of the Black Crowes members =

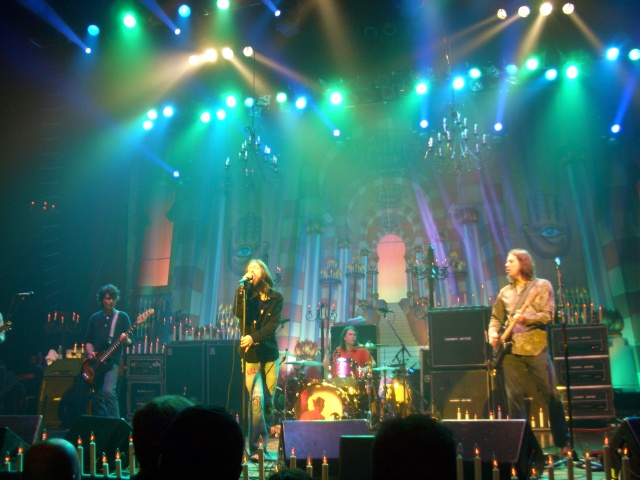
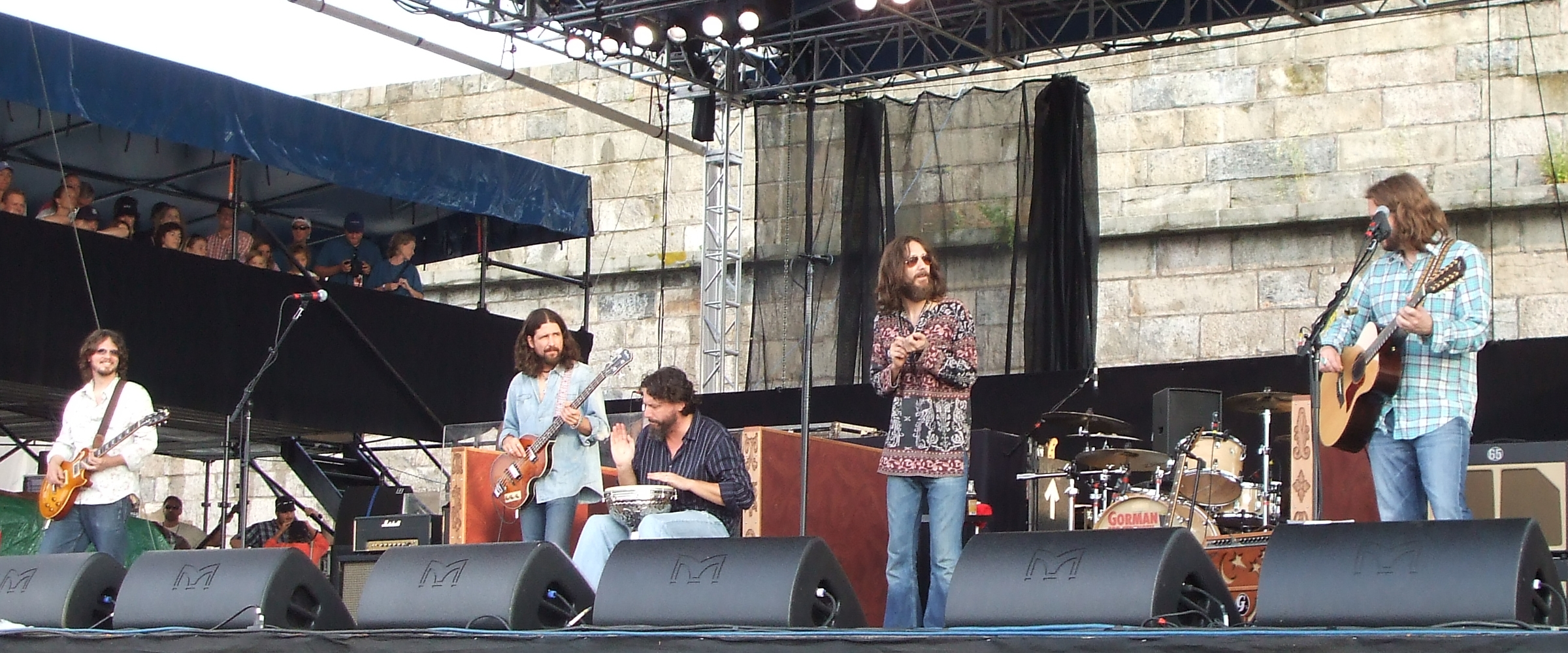
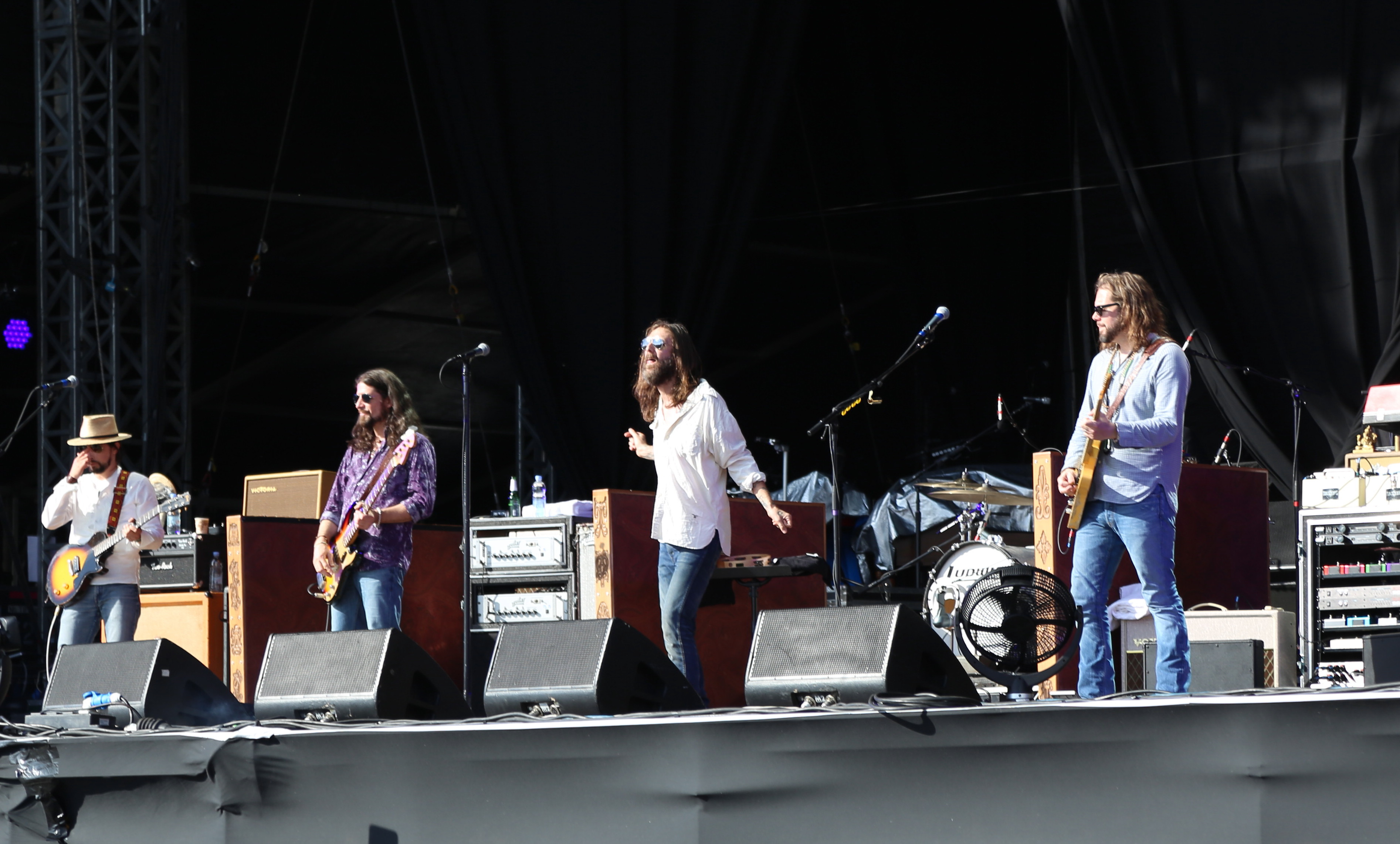
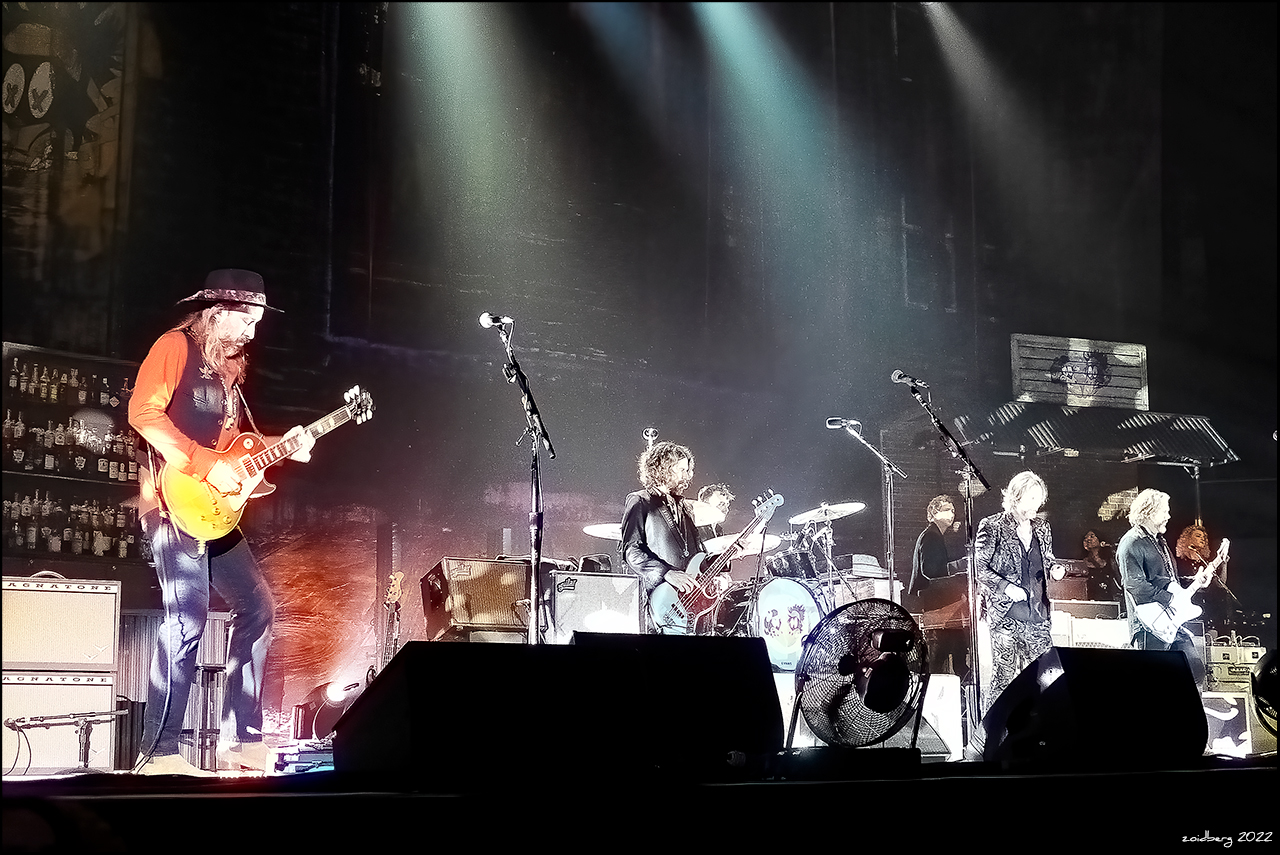
Four lineups of the Black Crowes in 2005, 2008, 2013 and 2022.

The Black Crowes are an American Southern rock band from Atlanta, Georgia. Originally formed by brothers Chris (lead vocals) and Rich Robinson (guitar) in 1984 as Mr Crowe's Garden, the group went through a series of early personnel changes before settling on a lineup including guitarist Jeff Cease, bassist Johnny Colt and drummer Steve Gorman in 1989. The current lineup of the band, which reformed in November 2019 after a very public breakup in 2015, includes the Robinson brothers and currently features new members Nico Bereciartua (guitar), Cully Symington (drums), Erik Deutsch (keyboards), and Mark "Muddy" Dutton (bass).

== History ==
=== 1984–2002 ===
Brothers Chris and Rich Robinson formed Mr. Crowe's Garden in 1984, working with a succession of six bassists and three drummers during the band's formative years. Early members included Keith Joyner (bass), Jeff Sullivan (drums), and Ted Selke (bass). By 1989, the group had been renamed the Black Crowes and featured guitarist Jeff Cease, bassist Johnny Colt and drummer Steve Gorman. After the release of the group's debut album Shake Your Money Maker, Cease was replaced by former Burning Tree guitarist Marc Ford in November 1991. Eddie Harsch was added as the band's first keyboardist the following year. After three more studio albums, Ford was dismissed in August 1997 due to heroin addiction, before Colt left shortly thereafter in October.

Colt was replaced by Sven Pipien for By Your Side, on which all guitars were performed by Rich Robinson. Audley Freed joined as a touring guitarist for shows starting in June 1998. In May 2000, Pipien was replaced by Greg Rzab, debuting on a tour with former Led Zeppelin guitarist Jimmy Page following the release of Live at the Greek. Rzab had left by the end of the year, and Rich Robinson played bass on the 2001 release Lions. Andy Hess took over Rzab's vacated position once the album was recorded, debuting in February 2001. After a final tour which spawned a live release simply titled Live, Gorman left the Black Crowes in December 2001 and the remaining members announced the band's "indefinite hiatus" the following month.

Steve Gorman was a member of Mr. Crowes Garden before they were named the Black Crowes

=== 2005 onward ===
After a three-year hiatus, the Black Crowes reformed in March 2005 with a lineup of Chris and Rich Robinson, former members Marc Ford and Sven Pipien, and new drummer Bill Dobrow. Within two months, Gorman had returned as the band's drummer. After a tour which spawned the live release Freak 'n' Roll... Into the Fog, Harsch left in August 2006 due to "health reasons" and was replaced by Rob Clores. Just over a week later, Ford also left the band citing "health reasons", with Paul Stacey taking his place for upcoming tour dates. Clores was dismissed and replaced by Adam MacDougall in July 2007, and in November Luther Dickinson joined as second guitarist, after having performed on Warpaint. After a final tour, the band went on "indefinite hiatus" again in July 2011.

The Black Crowes announced its return again on Christmas Day 2012 with Jackie Greene taking Dickinson's place in the band for tour dates starting the following March. The tour was followed by a period of extended inactivity before Rich Robinson formally announced in January 2015 that the Black Crowes had broken up due to a disagreement between him and brother Chris regarding ownership of the band.

However, in November 2019 after several weeks of rumors, it was announced that the Black Crowes had reunited for a planned 2020 tour in commemoration of the 30th anniversary of Shake Your Money Maker, with a new lineup including the Robinson brothers, guitarist Isaiah Mitchell, bassist Tim Lefebvre, drummer Raj Ojha and keyboardist Joel Robinow. This lineup would completely change before the tour was completed, except Chris and Rich Robinson who remain the only original members.

As of March 2026, The Black Crowes lineup is:

- Chris Robinson – lead vocals, harmonica, guitar
- Rich Robinson – guitar, backing vocals
- Nico Bereciartua – guitar, backing vocals (touring only)
- Mark "Muddy" Dutton – bass, backing vocals
- Cully Symington – drums (touring only)
- Erik Deutsch – keyboards, backing vocals (touring only)

== Members ==
=== Current ===
Image	Name	Years active	Instruments	Release contributions
	Chris Robinson	1989–2002; 2005–2011; 2012–2015; 2019–present	lead vocals; harmonica; acoustic guitar; percussion	all Black Crowes releases
	Rich Robinson	1989–2002; 2005–2011; 2012–2015; 2019–present	guitar; backing vocals; bass (2001)	all Black Crowes releases
	Erik Deutsch	2022–present (session/touring)	keyboards; backing vocals	Happiness Bastards (2024); A Pound of Feathers (2026)
	Nico Bereciartua	2023–present (session/touring)	guitar	none
	Cully Symington	2023–present (session/touring)	drums	A Pound of Feathers (2026)
	Mark "Muddy" Dutton	2026–present (session/touring)	bass; backing vocals	none

=== Former ===
Image	Name	Years active	Instruments	Release contributions
	Steve Gorman	1989–2001; 2005–2011; 2012–2015	drums; percussion	all Black Crowes releases from Shake Your Money Maker (1990) to Wiser for the Time (2013)
	Johnny Colt (Charles Brandt)	1989–1997	bass	all Black Crowes releases from Shake Your Money Maker (1990) to Sho' Nuff Live (1998); The Lost Crowes (2006)
	Jeff Cease	1989–1991	guitar	Shake Your Money Maker (1990)
	Marc Ford	1991–1997; 2005–2006	guitar; backing vocals	all Black Crowes releases from The Southern Harmony and Musical Companion (1992) to Sho' Nuff Live (1998); Freak 'n' Roll... Into the Fog (2006); The Lost Crowes (2006)
	Eddie Harsch (Edward Hawrysch)	1992–2002; 2005–2006 (died 2016)	keyboards; piano	all Black Crowes releases from The Southern Harmony and Musical Companion (1992) to The Lost Crowes (2006)
	Sven Pipien	1997–2000; 2005–2011; 2012–2015; 2021–2026	bass; backing vocals	By Your Side (1999); Live at the Greek (2000); Freak 'n' Roll... Into the Fog (2006); all Black Crowes releases from Warpaint (2008) to Happiness Bastards (2024)
	Audley Freed	1998–2002 (initially a touring member only)	guitar	Live at the Greek (2000); Lions (2001); Live (2002)
	Greg Rzab	2000	bass	Live at Jones Beach (EP/2000) w/Jimmy Page
	Andy Hess	2001–2002	bass	Live (2002)
	Bill Dobrow	2005	drums	none – live performances only
	Rob Clores	2006–2007	keyboards	none – live performances only
	Paul Stacey	2006–2007	guitar	none – live performances only
	Adam MacDougall	2007–2011; 2012–2015	keyboards; backing vocals	all Black Crowes releases from Warpaint (2008) to Wiser for the Time (2013)
	Luther Dickinson	2007–2011	guitar; mandolin; harmonica	all Black Crowes releases from Warpaint (2008) to Wiser for the Time (2013)
	Jackie Greene	2012–2015	guitar; backing vocals	none – live performances only
	Isaiah Mitchell	2019–2023 (session/touring)	guitar; backing vocals	1972 (2022); Shake Your Money Maker Live (2023)
	Joel Robinow	2019–2022 (session/touring)	keyboards; backing vocals	1972 (2022); Shake Your Money Maker Live (2023)
	Raj Kumar Ojha	2019–2020 (touring only)	drums	none – live performances only
	Tim Lefebvre	2019–2020 (touring only)	bass	none – live performances only
	Brian Griffin	2021–2023 (session/touring)	drums	1972 (2022); Shake Your Money Maker Live (2023); Happiness Bastards (2024)

== Lineups ==
Period	Members	Releases
Late 1989 – November 1991	Chris Robinson – lead vocals, harmonica, guitar; Rich Robinson – guitar, backing vocals; Jeff Cease – guitar; Johnny Colt – bass; Steve Gorman – drums, percussion	Shake Your Money Maker (1990)
November 1991 – August 1997	Chris Robinson – lead vocals, harmonica, guitar; Rich Robinson – guitar, backing vocals; Marc Ford – guitar, backing vocals; Johnny Colt – bass; Steve Gorman – drums, percussion; Eddie Harsch – keyboards, piano (initially a touring member 1991–92)	The Southern Harmony and Musical Companion (1992); Amorica (1994); Three Snakes and One Charm (1996); Sho' Nuff Live (1998); The Lost Crowes (2006)
August – October 1997	Chris Robinson – lead vocals, harmonica, guitar; Rich Robinson – guitar, backing vocals; Johnny Colt – bass; Steve Gorman – drums, percussion; Eddie Harsch – keyboards, piano	none
December 1997 – June 1998	Chris Robinson – lead vocals, harmonica, guitar; Rich Robinson – guitar, backing vocals; Sven Pipien – bass, backing vocals; Steve Gorman – drums, percussion; Eddie Harsch – keyboards, piano	By Your Side (1999)
June 1998 – May 2000	Chris Robinson – lead vocals, harmonica, guitar; Rich Robinson – guitar, backing vocals; Audley Freed – guitar (touring only); Sven Pipien – bass, backing vocals; Steve Gorman – drums, percussion; Eddie Harsch – keyboards, piano	Live at the Greek (2000) (with Jimmy Page)
May – December 2000	Chris Robinson – lead vocals, harmonica, guitar; Rich Robinson – guitar, backing vocals; Audley Freed – guitar; Greg Rzab – bass; Steve Gorman – drums, percussion; Eddie Harsch – keyboards, piano	none
January – February 2001	Chris Robinson – lead vocals, harmonica, guitar; Rich Robinson – guitar, bass, backing vocals; Audley Freed – guitar; Steve Gorman – drums, percussion; Eddie Harsch – keyboards, piano	Lions (2001)
February – December 2001	Chris Robinson – lead vocals, harmonica, guitar; Rich Robinson – guitar, backing vocals; Audley Freed – guitar; Andy Hess – bass; Steve Gorman – drums, percussion; Eddie Harsch – keyboards, piano	Live (2002)
December 2001 – January 2002	Chris Robinson – lead vocals, harmonica, guitar; Rich Robinson – guitar, backing vocals; Audley Freed – guitar; Andy Hess – bass; Eddie Harsch – keyboards, piano	none
Band inactive January 2002 – March 2005
March – May 2005	Chris Robinson – lead vocals, harmonica, guitar; Rich Robinson – guitar, backing vocals; Marc Ford – guitar, backing vocals; Sven Pipien – bass, backing vocals; Bill Dobrow – drums; Eddie Harsch – keyboards, piano	none
May 2005 – August 2006	Chris Robinson – lead vocals, harmonica, guitar; Rich Robinson – guitar, backing vocals; Marc Ford – guitar, backing vocals; Sven Pipien – bass, backing vocals; Steve Gorman – drums, percussion; Eddie Harsch – keyboards, piano	Freak 'n' Roll... Into the Fog: The Black Crowes All Join Hands, The Fillmore, San Francisco (2006)
August – September 2006	Chris Robinson – lead vocals, harmonica, guitar; Rich Robinson – guitar, backing vocals; Marc Ford – guitar, backing vocals; Sven Pipien – bass, backing vocals; Steve Gorman – drums, percussion; Rob Clores – keyboards	none
September 2006 – July 2007	Chris Robinson – lead vocals, harmonica, guitar; Rich Robinson – guitar, backing vocals; Paul Stacey – guitar (touring only); Sven Pipien – bass, backing vocals; Steve Gorman – drums, percussion; Rob Clores – keyboards	none
July – November 2007	Chris Robinson – lead vocals, harmonica, guitar; Rich Robinson – guitar, backing vocals; Paul Stacey – guitar (touring only); Sven Pipien – bass, backing vocals; Steve Gorman – drums, percussion; Adam MacDougall – keyboards, backing vocals	none
November 2007 – July 2011	Chris Robinson – lead vocals, harmonica, guitar; Rich Robinson – guitar, backing vocals; Luther Dickinson – guitar, harmonica; Sven Pipien – bass, backing vocals; Steve Gorman – drums, percussion; Adam MacDougall – keyboards, backing vocals	Warpaint (2008); Warpaint Live (2009); Before the Frost... Until the Freeze (2009); Croweology (2010); Wiser for the Time (2013)
Band inactive July 2011 – December 2012
December 2012 – January 2015	Chris Robinson – lead vocals, harmonica, guitar; Rich Robinson – guitar, backing vocals; Jackie Greene – guitar, backing vocals; Sven Pipien – bass, backing vocals; Steve Gorman – drums, percussion; Adam MacDougall – keyboards, backing vocals	none
Band inactive January 2015 – November 2019
November 2019 – 2021	Chris Robinson – lead vocals, harmonica, guitar; Rich Robinson – guitar, backing vocals; Isaiah Mitchell – guitar, backing vocals (touring only); Tim Lefebvre – bass (touring only); Raj Kumar Ojha – drums (touring only); Joel Robinow – keyboards, backing vocals (touring only)	none
2021–2022	Chris Robinson – lead vocals, harmonica, guitar; Rich Robinson – guitar, backing vocals; Isaiah Mitchell – guitar, backing vocals (touring only); Sven Pipien – bass, backing vocals; Brian Griffin – drums, (touring only); Joel Robinow – keyboards, backing vocals (touring only)	1972 (2022); Shake Your Moneymaker Live (2023)
2022–2023	Chris Robinson – lead vocals, harmonica, guitar; Rich Robinson – guitar, backing vocals; Isaiah Mitchell – guitar, backing vocals (touring only); Sven Pipien – bass, backing vocals; Brian Griffin – drums (touring only); Erik Deutsch – keyboards, backing vocals (touring only)	none
2023	Chris Robinson – lead vocals, harmonica, guitar; Rich Robinson – guitar, backing vocals; Nico Bereciartua – guitar, backing vocals (touring only); Sven Pipien – bass, backing vocals; Brian Griffin – drums (touring only); Erik Deutsch – keyboards, backing vocals (touring only)	Happiness Bastards (2024)
2023–2025	Chris Robinson – lead vocals, harmonica, guitar; Rich Robinson – guitar, backing vocals; Nico Bereciartua – guitar, backing vocals (touring only); Sven Pipien – bass, backing vocals; Cully Symington – drums (touring only); Erik Deutsch – keyboards, backing vocals (touring only)	none
2026–present	Chris Robinson – lead vocals, harmonica, guitar; Rich Robinson – guitar, backing vocals; Nico Bereciartua – guitar, backing vocals (touring only); Mark "Muddy" Dutton – bass, backing vocals (touring only); Cully Symington – drums (touring only); Erik Deutsch – keyboards, backing vocals (touring only)	A Pound of Feathers (2026)
