= Live (The Black Crowes album) =

Live album by The Black Crowes
- Released: August 20, 2002
- Recorded: October 30/31, 2001
- Venues: The Orpheum (Boston, MA)
- Genres: Blues-rock, hard rock, southern rock
- Label: V2
- Producer: Rich Robinson

The Black Crowes chronology
Lions (2001)	Live (2002)	Freak 'n' Roll...Into the Fog (2006)

The Black Crowes live chronology
Live at the Greek: Excess All Areas (1999)	Live (2002)	Freak 'n' Roll...Into the Fog (2006)

Professional ratings
Review scores
Source	Rating
Allmusic	3/5 stars
Entertainment Weekly	C
Q	3/5 stars
Rolling Stone	3/5 stars

Live is a live album by The Black Crowes, released on August 20, 2002. It was produced by Rich Robinson and recorded at the Orpheum in Boston, MA on October 30 & 31, 2001 (the last two shows before the band went on hiatus for a few years).

== Track listing ==
All songs written by Chris Robinson and Rich Robinson, except where noted.

=== Disc one ===
1. "Midnight from the Inside Out" – 4:46
2. "Sting Me" – 4:28
3. "Thick 'n' Thin" – 3:42
4. "Greasy Grass River" – 3:38
5. "Sometimes Salvation" – 6:29
6. "Cursed Diamond" – 6:08
7. "Miracle to Me" – 6:12
8. "Wiser Time" – 7:39
9. "Girl from a Pawnshop" – 6:44
10. "Cosmic Friend" – 5:08

=== Disc two ===
1. "Black Moon Creeping" – 5:59
2. "High Head Blues" – 6:11
3. "Title Song" – 8:25
4. "She Talks to Angels" – 6:01
5. "Twice As Hard" – 4:35
6. "Lickin'" – 5:14
7. "Soul Singing" – 3:53
8. "Hard to Handle" (Allen Jones, Alvertis Isbell, Otis Redding) – 3:26
9. "Remedy" – 5:36

Japanese bonus track

10. "My Morning Song" – 15:55

== Personnel ==
The Black Crowes

- Chris Robinson – vocals
- Rich Robinson – guitar, backing vocals
- Audley Freed – guitar, backing vocals
- Steve Gorman – drums
- Eddie Harsch – keyboards, backing vocals
- Andy Hess – bass

Production

- Rich Robinson – production, mixing
- Chris Ribando – engineer, mixing
- Leon Zervos – mastering
- V2 Image Control – design
- Pete Angelus – personal management
- Mary Ellen Matthews – photography
- Butch Belair – photography
