= Sho' Nuff (album) =

Sho' Nuff: The Complete Black Crowes

Box set by the Black Crowes
- Released: 1998
- Genre: Rock; blues rock
- Length: 116:05
- Label: American

Sho' Nuff: The Complete Black Crowes is a five-disc box set from the Black Crowes. It contains their first four studio albums and a bonus live EP. The studio albums were remastered, contain bonus tracks and each include a screen saver and music videos presented in multimedia format. The Sho' Nuff edition of Amorica includes neither 'Tied Up and Swallowed' (bonus track on the original 1994 CD release) nor 'Chevrolet' (bonus on the Japanese release).

The EP consists of five tracks recorded live at the Beacon Theatre in New York City, between March 18–22, 1995. The box also includes two Black Crowes stickers.

All discs were printed on the American Recordings label (the first two had originally been released on Def American, the label's original name).

Professional ratings
Review scores
Source	Rating
AllMusic	4/5 stars
Kerrang!	4/5 stars

== Album listing ==
- 1990: Shake Your Money Maker
  - Bonus tracks: "Don't Wake Me", "She Talks to Angels" (Acoustic)
  - Music videos: "Jealous Again", "She Talks to Angels"
- 1992: The Southern Harmony and Musical Companion
  - Bonus tracks: "Sting Me" (Slow version), "99 lbs."
  - Music videos: "Remedy", "Sometimes Salvation"
- 1994: Amorica
  - Bonus tracks: "Song of the Flesh", "Sunday Night Buttermilk Waltz"
  - Music videos: "Highhead Blues", "Wiser Time"
- 1996: Three Snakes & One Charm
  - Bonus tracks: "Just Say You're Sorry", "Mellow Down Easy"
  - Music video: "Blackberry"
- 1998: Live – see separate page for details

== Personnel ==
- Jeff Cease – guitar (Shake Your Money Maker only)
- Johnny Colt – bass
- Marc Ford – guitar (except Shake Your Money Maker)
- Steve Gorman – drums
- Eddie Harsch – keyboards
- Chris Robinson – vocals
- Rich Robinson – guitar

Production

- The Black Crowes – production (except Shake Your Money Maker)
- George Drakoulias – production (Shake Your Money Maker & The Southern Harmony and Musical Companion only)
- Jack Joseph Puig – production (Amorica & Three Snakes & One Charm only)
- Leon Zervos – remastering
