= By Your Side (The Black Crowes album) =

Studio album by The Black Crowes
- Released: January 12, 1999
- Recorded: 1998
- Studios: Avatar, New York City
- Genres: Southern rock; boogie rock
- Length: 44:55
- Label: Columbia
- Producer: Kevin Shirley

The Black Crowes chronology
Three Snakes and One Charm (1996)	By Your Side (1999)	Lions (2001)

Singles from By Your Side
- 1. "Kickin' My Heart Around" Released: November 2, 1998; 2. "Only a Fool" Released: February 1999; 3. "By Your Side" Released: February 16, 1999 (Europe); 4. "Go Faster" Released: June 1999

By Your Side is the fifth studio album by American rock band The Black Crowes. It was released on January 12, 1999 on Columbia Records, following the band's move from American Recordings, after second guitarist Marc Ford and bassist Johnny Colt had left the band in 1997. It is their only album to be released on that label. Audley Freed and Sven Pipien were hired as the new guitarist and bassist, respectively, although Rich Robinson played all the guitar parts on the album. By Your Side was recorded in New York City during the second quarter of 1998 and produced by Kevin Shirley. It comprised songs written in the studio, revised songs from pre-production and re-recorded songs from the abandoned 1997 album Band.

The Black Crowes promoted By Your Side by performing on numerous television programs in North America and Europe. The album debuted at its peak position of number 26 on the Billboard 200 and generally received positive reviews. While some critics depreciated By Your Side for its similarity to albums by Rod Stewart and The Rolling Stones, most reviewers lauded The Black Crowes' return to the straightforward approach of their debut album, Shake Your Money Maker (1990). Chris Robinson's singing and Rich's guitar playing also won praise from critics, though reviews of the lyrics were mixed.

Beginning in February 1999, the band toured North American theaters for two months in support of the album. Setlists from the tour, known as the "Souled Out Tour", typically included more than half the album's songs. The concerts were followed by a short co-headlining tour of US amphitheaters with Lenny Kravitz. The band spent the remainder of the summer opening for Aerosmith's European tour.

== Background ==
Personnel changes and label interference frustrated The Black Crowes' attempts to follow up their 1996 album Three Snakes and One Charm. During May and June 1997, they recorded an album called Band, but it was rejected by their label. Lead singer Chris Robinson said American "couldn't go with the vibe" and wanted something more "safe". In August, guitarist Marc Ford was fired due to a heroin habit that impaired his performances. Guitarist Rich Robinson said, "We would be onstage playing 'Remedy', and he would be playing a completely different song.... We told him to clean up or get out. We assumed, since he loved music and the band, that he would clean up." Bassist Johnny Colt had been losing interest in the band since the recording of Three Snakes and One Charm; his contributions to that album were minimal, as Rich played bass in his stead on all but one track. Colt quit in October to become a yoga instructor.

Sven Pipien was hired in December to replace Colt. Pipien had previously played with Mary My Hope and had been a housemate of Chris. Audley Freed was hired as the second guitarist before a 1998 tour in support of the band's Sho' Nuff box set. Recording sessions for By Your Side were well underway at this point, and continued after the tour, but Freed did not contribute to the album. Chris said of the new members, "It's great. These guys want to be here—and we feed off of that. And that will become obvious when you see us on the road."

American Recordings was partially absorbed by Columbia Records in early 1998. Though the arrangement preserved the American label, The Black Crowes transferred to Columbia after privately expressing their desire to disassociate themselves from American Recordings founder Rick Rubin. Despite working under a larger label, the band felt they had more freedom and support under Columbia; Chris remarked, "At American, I never knew what a record company did. We never had an A&R guy. Now we have a product manager.... It's like ... I didn't know what the music business was."

== Writing and production ==
Pre-production for By Your Side began in December 1997 with songs that later underwent substantial revision or were dropped altogether. Early versions of "HorseHead" and "It Must Be Over" were recorded at this point, and a reworked riff from "Every Little Bit" and some lyrics from "Tickle Tickle" were later incorporated into "Heavy". Some of the songs ultimately dropped, such as "Baby" and "Bled to Death", were later rewritten by Rich for his debut solo album, Paper (2004). More songs were introduced in January 1998, including "Red Wine Stains", which eventually became "Go Faster", and an early version of "Virtue and Vice". Some unused sections from this batch were borrowed for Paper, as well, including the main riffs of what became "Tomorrow Is Here" and "Thrown It All Away".

"Kickin' My Heart Around"
"Incendiary slide" guitar and "wailing blues harp" are featured on "Kickin' My Heart Around", a track that Jim Farber of the New York Daily News wrote "splices together Mick Jagger's 'Memo from Turner' with Lynyrd Skynyrd's 'What's Yer Name'".

Producer Kevin Shirley was brought in on the advice of Aerosmith guitarist Joe Perry. As Rich explained, "We really wanted to work with someone who can come in and say, 'That's not good.' ... If Kevin says something I disagree with, he'll be the first one to say, 'Hey, it's your song,' but it's healthy for me and Chris to have him come in and be as excited about our songs as we are and say, 'Okay, that's cool, but what if we tried this?'" At his first meeting with the band, Shirley described the songs played for him as having "the same old jammy, shuffle feel of the last two records. I stopped them then and I said to them ... 'You've got to feel like you're teenagers again. You need a song like that.'" Shirley's prompting led the band to write "Kickin' My Heart Around" on the spot, before he had signed on to produce. Rich agreed that Shirley shifted the focus to making "a rock record" that was "focused and concise".

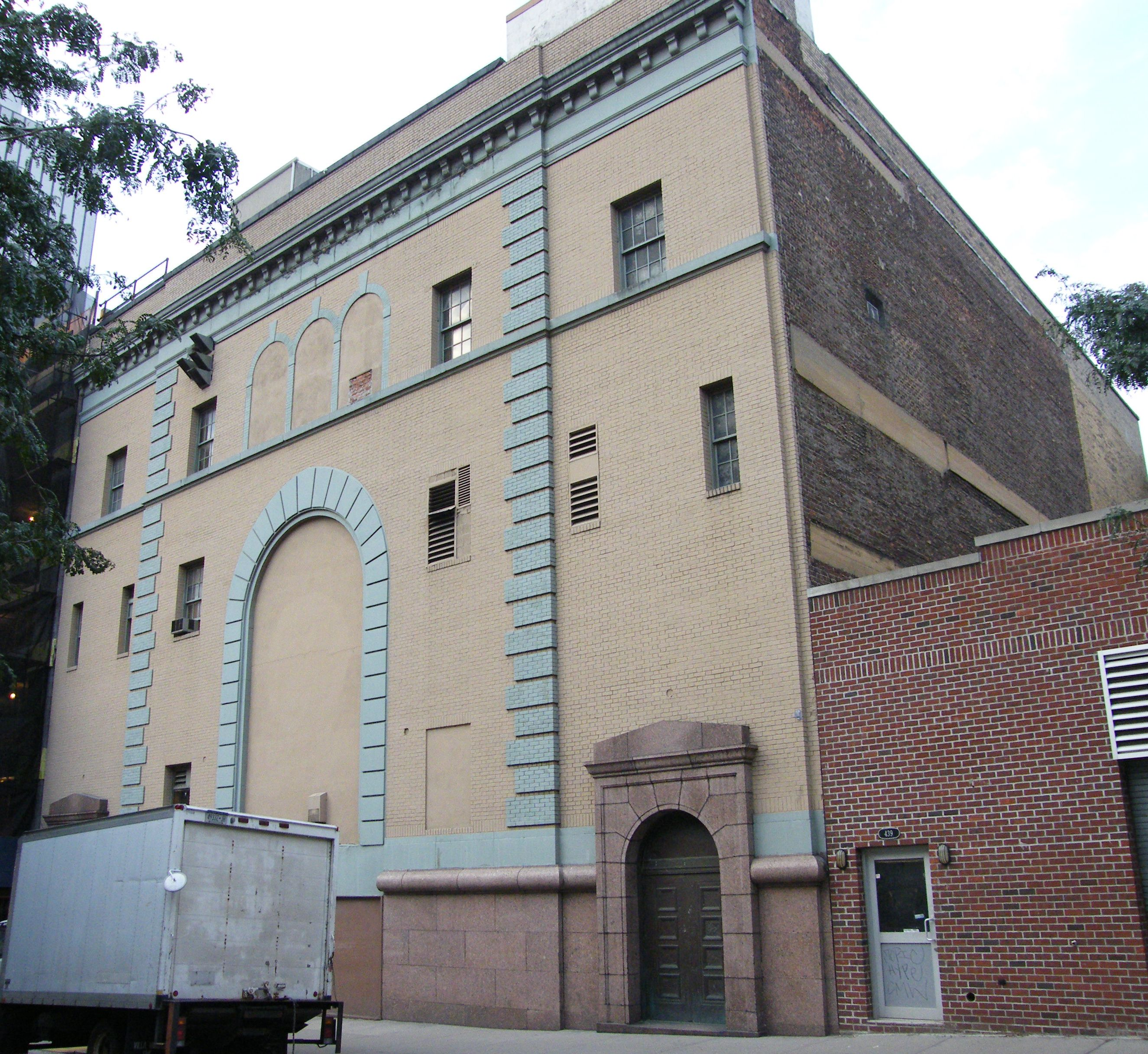
The Black Crowes recorded By Your Side at Avatar Studios in Manhattan.

The band hired Shirley and agreed to his recording conditions, which meant recording in New York City at Avatar Studios, taking weekends off and recording from 1:00–8:00 pm. Chris said of the rigid schedule, "We loved it.... We had lives other than just being in the studio 24 hours a day, seven days a week. Got a different vantage point on the whole thing." Shirley's laid-back style also won praise from the band. "Kevin is the first guy that I've worked with that just went with it—especially my singing. A lot of this album is just my scratch vocals. It's very loose, and Kevin let it go.... He'd say, if we didn't get it in two or three takes, 'We'll come back tomorrow'", said Chris. Of the album's lyrical bent, Chris said, "...there is a lot of love on it, and I've never written love songs. I do think having a muse in my life like the woman I'm with now helped.... I think there's also a lot of humor on this album, which is something we haven't touched on before, except maybe on Shake Your Money Maker, which was a lighter time and a lighter mood." There was also a conscious effort to "simplify the language", which was inspired by Chris's listening to music by Otis Redding, George Jones and Muddy Waters. "I realized how direct and honest those records were – and I wanted that here", said Chris.

For the first time on a Black Crowes album, Rich was the only guitarist involved in the recording. He said recording that way was not a challenge because he recorded most of the guitar parts on Three Snakes and One Charm, as well. Rich also noted that having only one guitarist gives the band "a different dynamic" because it affords Pipien and keyboardist Eddie Harsch "a lot of space". Chris praised his brother's performance, saying, "It sounds like there's two guitarists, two distinct personalities."

Fifteen songs were recorded in the second quarter of 1998 during the main recording session with Kevin Shirley. Some were updated versions of songs from pre-production; a few were totally new; others combined newly written music with parts from older, shelved songs. The main riff of a Three Snakes and One Charm leftover called "Pastoral", for example, was used for the B-side "You Don't Have to Go", while its chorus riff was borrowed for "Then She Said My Name". Four of the songs were holdovers from the Band sessions: "Only a Fool" and "If It Ever Stops Raining" were included on the album (the latter with new chorus lyrics as "By Your Side"), while "Peace Anyway" and "Smile" were released as B-sides. One cover song, Bob Dylan's "When the Night Comes Falling from the Sky", was recorded during the session and later released as a B-side.

While touring in support of Sho' Nuff, Chris and Rich finished writing "Diamond Ring" and "Go Tell the Congregation". The two songs were recorded after the tour during a planned session for putting finishing touches on By Your Side, though the decision delayed the album's release from November 17 to January 12. Rich said, "It's cool that Columbia Records is backing us on an artistic level and they're being open to all the hassles that come with moving an album into the new year. I know we're driving them insane with these last-minute changes, but we know it's all for the right reasons." After finishing the album, Chris noted that it "has the same sort of energy" as Shake Your Money Maker, "...but there is much more to it. There are a lot of subtleties in these songs. These are rock 'n' roll songs with subversive pop hooks."

== Promotion and release ==
The Black Crowes began promoting By Your Side in September 1998 when they performed at the Hard Rock Cafe in New York City for an episode of the VH1 show Hard Rock Live; the episode aired on December 12. The first noticeable instance of promotion was Columbia's release of "Kickin' My Heart Around" as the album's first single on November 2, 1998. The track spent ten weeks at its peak position of number 3 on the Billboard Mainstream Rock Tracks chart starting on November 28; it also charted in Canada and the UK. The band's next promotional event was a performance and interview for a live album premiere radio broadcast on January 6. On January 11, the Crowes performed "Kickin' My Heart Around" on the Late Show with David Letterman.

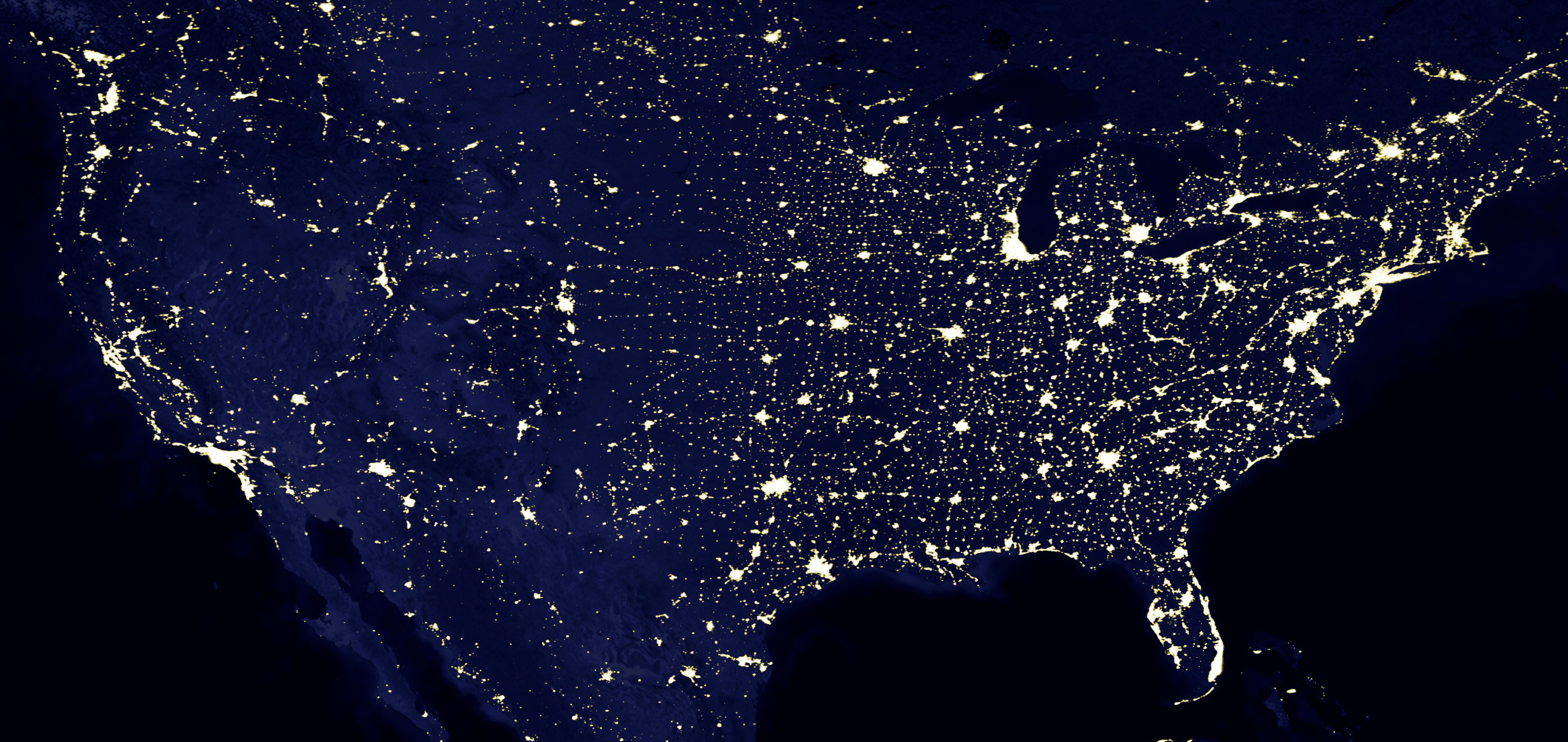
The back of the CD booklet reproduces a nighttime satellite photograph of the contiguous United States, similar to this one, that shows light pollution in densely populated areas.

By Your Side was released on January 12, 1999. The album's cover art is a blue-tinted nighttime photograph of the band, all dressed in white and standing in front of a lake. The band name is rendered in tiny white lights above their heads, and other small white lights are scattered at their feet. In keeping with the tiny lights theme, the back of the booklet shows a satellite image of the United States at night, in which densely populated areas can be discerned by light pollution, and the booklet contains drawings of constellations. The album's disc artwork is designed after a centaur with a crow's head in place of the man's head.

On the day the album was released, the band appeared at a Tower Records store in Manhattan to sign autographs and give away 1,000 tickets to that night's private show at Irving Plaza. By Your Side debuted at its peak position of number 26 on the Billboard 200 on January 30. The album has sold 271,000 copies in the US as of January 2002. The next two weeks were filled with radio and television appearances in Canada, Belgium, France, Sweden, and Italy. The Black Crowes returned to the US to perform during pre-game festivities at Joe Robbie Stadium before Super Bowl XXXIII on January 31. While on tour in support of the album in February, the band performed the second single, "Only a Fool", on Late Night with Conan O'Brien. The single was released in mid-February and peaked at number 7 on the Billboard Mainstream Rock Tracks chart. The accompanying promotional video was directed by "Weird Al" Yankovic. After an early April stop at an Atlanta radio station where the band played a half-hour acoustic set, The Black Crowes made a third late night television appearance at the end of that month, playing the album's third single, "Go Faster", on The Tonight Show with Jay Leno. "Go Faster" peaked at number 24 on the Mainstream Rock Tracks chart in July. Also in late April, Chris Robinson promoted By Your Side in an interview on The Daily Show with Jon Stewart.

== Critical reception ==
Professional ratings
Review scores
Source	Rating
AllMusic	4/5 stars
Entertainment Weekly	B+
The Globe and Mail	2.5/4 stars
Houston Chronicle	2.5/4 stars
The New Zealand Herald	3/5 stars
NME	7/10
Rolling Stone	3/5 stars
Toronto Sun	3/5 stars
Wall of Sound	83/100

By Your Side was generally well received by critics. Regarding the songwriting, most reviewers praised The Black Crowes for returning to the straightforwardness of Shake Your Money Maker (1990) following the more adventuresome Amorica (1994) and Three Snakes and One Charm. Gemma Tarlach of The Milwaukee Journal Sentinel welcomed the album "because it represents a great band's return to what it does best", calling it "45 minutes of good, dirty fun". Wall of Sound's Russell Hall found that the band's emergence from "the jam-band haze that's infected" their recent work resulted in a "laser-sharp focus". Mark Falkner of The Florida Times-Union said that beyond the band's mastery of their influences' musical styles, what prevents them "from being just another tribute act is that they have (also) mastered the power, the passion and the fun that made the mix work". Some critics, also noting the change in approach, derided the band for returning to mine the same influences perceived in their debut album. Jim Farber of the Daily News thus described By Your Side as "a copy-of-a-copy-of-a-copy" and marked "Go Faster" a sped-up version of Humble Pie's "Hot 'n' Nasty". The Times' Nigel Williamson called "HorseHead" "Zeppelinesque" and labeled "By Your Side" "a kicking boogie half way between [the Faces'] 'Cindy Incidentally' and [The Rolling Stones'] 'Tumbling Dice'". Steve Dougherty of People summed up by commenting, "Purists will wonder why to buy this album when [The Rolling Stones'] 1972 Exile on Main Street or [Rod] Stewart's 1970 Gasoline Alley exist on CD."

On some tracks, the influence of soul music was perceived. Richard Harrington of The Washington Post wrote that "Only a Fool" "conjures '60s-era Stax-Volt passions while Robinson's jubilant vocals evoke Redding's rough-edged insistence" and compared "Diamond Ring" to Al Green's work. The Dirty Dozen Brass Band's playing on "Welcome to the Goodtimes" was called "infectious" by Wayne Bledsoe of The Knoxville News-Sentinel.

"Virtue and Vice"
Dan Aquilante of the New York Post found "Virtue and Vice" to be the most unusual song on By Your Side and reminiscent of Traffic as Eddie Harsch's "jazzy piano [duels] with Rich Robinson's fat guitar work".

The musical performances and sound of the album were frequently hailed by critics. Lorraine Ali of Rolling Stone identified Rich Robinson's guitar playing as "brilliant in spots, letting it rip with Southern-rock abandon or lazy, drawling slide guitar". Allmusic's Stephen Thomas Erlewine praised the band's retention of the sonic detail from Amorica, and Jane Stevenson of the Toronto Sun appreciated the "soulful" backing vocals throughout. Echoing those sentiments was CMJ, which noted the "lazy slide-guitar textures, harmonica moans and choirs of soulful singers", but also stated "Chris Robinson's gritty, cocksure vocals blaze the trail." Stephen Thompson of The A.V. Club called Robinson's vocal performance on "HorseHead" "an inflection-for-inflection imitation of ... Billy Squier"; elsewhere on the album Robinson's voice was compared to that of Rod Stewart. Stewart himself called the album "brilliant" and said it "absolutely knocked [him] out". Robinson's lyrics were alternately praised and panned. The Guardian's Caroline Sullivan called "Go Faster" an amalgam of the band's interests, "including drugs ... nubile wenchhood ... scrapes ... and touring". The Washington Post's Harrington, however, called Robinson "convincing when he sings [in 'Virtue and Vice'], 'I feel so alive today and that's all I want to say/ I hope it stays this way,' adding, 'If not, I'll be okay'".

== Concert tours ==
The Black Crowes played a few shows in the eastern US in early January before the release of By Your Side, then spent the rest of the month promoting the album via television appearances in the US, Canada and Europe. A brief warm-up show in Milwaukee, Wisconsin, on February 10 preceded a two-month tour of North American theaters, called the Souled Out Tour, with Moke as the opening band. Every song from By Your Side was played at some point on this tour – "Go Faster", "Kickin' My Heart Around", "By Your Side" and "Virtue and Vice" were performed at most shows, but "Diamond Ring" was played only twice. A 1963 Fender Esquire guitar belonging to Rich was stolen from the backstage area at DeVos Performance Hall in Grand Rapids, Michigan, on February 16. The band's management waited six weeks before issuing a press release asking for its return, hoping the guitar would turn up in a local pawnshop. No update on the guitar was ever provided. After taking two weeks off, the band spent six weeks playing outdoor amphitheaters in the US on a co-headlining tour with Lenny Kravitz; opening acts were Everlast and Cree Summer.

Beginning in June, The Black Crowes toured Europe for six weeks, opening for Aerosmith in concert halls and at festivals. "Go Faster" and "Kickin' My Heart Around" remained staples of the band's 60- to 75-minute sets. Harsch required emergency surgery for a twisted intestine on June 24 and missed the band's next eight shows. (The crew continued to set up Harsch's keyboards and placed a human-sized inflatable green alien in his spot.) One of the shows Harsch missed was a charity concert in London at which The Black Crowes played a 45-minute set of Led Zeppelin songs and blues covers with Jimmy Page. The band's last show in support of By Your Side was a one-off festival date in Niigata, Japan, on July 30.

== Track listing ==
All songs written by Chris Robinson and Rich Robinson.

1. "Go Faster" – 4:04
2. "Kickin' My Heart Around" – 3:40
3. "By Your Side" – 4:28
4. "HorseHead" – 4:02
5. "Only a Fool" – 3:43
6. "Heavy" – 4:43
7. "Welcome to the Goodtimes" – 4:00
8. "Go Tell the Congregation" – 3:36
9. "Diamond Ring" – 4:09
10. "Then She Said My Name" – 3:43
11. "Virtue and Vice" – 4:45

Australian bonus disc

1. "It Must Be Over" – 4:49
2. "You Don't Have to Go" – 4:24
3. "Twice As Hard" (From VH1 Hard Rock Live) – 4:34
4. "HorseHead" (Acoustic Version) – 4:12

Album session tracks included on single b-sides

1. "It Must Be Over" – 4:49 (Kickin' My Heart Around)
2. "You Don't Have to Go" – 4:24 (Kickin' My Heart Around)
3. "Smile" – 4:19 (Only A Fool)
4. "When The Night Comes Falling From The Sky" (Bob Dylan) – 4:10 (Only A Fool)
5. "Grows A Rose" – 3:17 (By Your Side)
6. "Peace Anyway" – 3:46 (By Your Side)
7. "HorseHead" (Acoustic Version) – 4:12 (By Your Side)

== Personnel ==
The Black Crowes

- Chris Robinson – vocals and harmonica
- Rich Robinson – guitar
- Steve Gorman – drums
- Eddie Harsch – keyboards
- Sven Pipien – bass guitar

Additional personnel

- Dirty Dozen Brass Band – horns
- Zoe Thrall – flute
- Curtis King, Cindy Mizelle, Tawatha Agee, Brenda White King, Vaneese Thomas – background vocals
- David Campbell – arranger

Production

- Kevin Shirley – producer, engineer, mixing
- Rich Alvy – engineer
- Pat Thrall – editing
- George Marino – mastering
- Leon Zervos – mastering
- Pete Angelus – personal manager
- Leslie Langlo – A&R
- John Kalodner – John Kalodner
- John Cheuse – art direction, design
- Josef Astor – photography
- Will Kennedy – digital imaging

== Charts ==
Chart (1999)	Peak position
US Billboard 200	26
Australia ARIA Album Chart	40
Austria Album Chart	47
Belgium Album Chart	18
Canada RPM Top 100 CDs	10
Finland Album Chart	21
France Album Chart	71
German Albums	28
Netherlands Album Chart	46
Norway Album Chart	23
Scottish Albums	36
Sweden Album Chart	11
UK Albums Chart	34
