= Thorn in My Pride =

1992 single by the Black Crowes

- Side A of the US 7-inch single

Single by the Black Crowes

from the album The Southern Harmony and Musical Companion
- B-side: "Sting Me" (slow version)
- Released: 1992
- Length: 6:02
- Label: Def American
- Songwriters: Chris Robinson, Rich Robinson
- Producers: George Drakoulias, the Black Crowes

The Black Crowes singles chronology
"Sting Me" (1992)	"Thorn in My Pride" (1992)	"Hotel Illness" (1992)

Music video
- "Thorn in My Pride" on YouTube

"Thorn in My Pride" is a song written by Chris and Rich Robinson that was first released on the Black Crowes' second studio album, The Southern Harmony and Musical Companion (1992). It was released as a single and reached number one on the US Billboard Album Rock Tracks chart.

== Writing and recording ==
The Robinsons wrote "Thorn in My Pride" during the Shake Your Money Maker tour in 1991 and began playing a rough version song of the song towards the end of the tour. Chris Robinson said the song took about 20 minutes to write, although it evolved before it was recorded for the album. Rich Robinson stated that "That was one that I really liked as soon as I wrote it. It was one of those songs that was a springboard for the rest of the record."

Chris Robinson felt that the "melancholy descending arpeggiated little thing in B" that Rich Robinson plays on the guitar was influenced by Nick Drake. Chris Robinson stated that the title came from his liking to play on words, in this case changing the phrase "thorn in my side" to "thorn in my pride". He said that "the lyrics are really searching", asking "Who am I? And what's going on? I have these new eyes to see with, my perspective has been changed.

Classic Rock critic Paul Elliott felt that the song "carried echoes of the Rolling Stones, Led Zeppelin, Bob Dylan, Lynyrd Skynyrd and Sly & The Family Stone." But Rich Robinson claimed that "Thorn in My Pride" carried the Black Crowes' own sound and that the Rolling Stones "would never do that."

Of the recording, Chris Robinson said "I mixed 'Thorn In My Pride' with our engineer, Brendan O' Brien, at the Record Plant in LA. And I hated it. They had this huge board with digital computers and shit, which Brendan loves. Forget it. I went over to Hollywood Sound, got on that little Neve board and hot-mixed the whole rest of the album in one evening. What else do you need?"

== Reception ==
AllMusic critic Matthew Greenwald praised "Thorn in My Pride" as one of the Black Crowes "finest compositions." Greenwald noted the song's "soulful tenderness" and stated that in the song "The roots of Otis Redding and Humble Pie meet with a viable grace." Fellow AllMusic critic Tim Sendra described it as a ballad that took a "nuanced approach" and stated that it "[felt] more organic and grounded thanks to the arrangements that make good use of percussion, Eddie Harsch's vintage keys, and [Marc] Ford's soaring leads." Ultimate Classic Rock critic Chuck Armstrong rated it as the Black Crowes seventh-best song, describing it as one of the band's "tamer songs" and praising its "soulful edge" and "emotional lyrics". Classic Rock critic Dave Everley described it as a "wrenching" ballad "in which an increasingly feverish Chris Robinson urges an unnamed lover to 'Let your love light shine on me.'" Press-Register critic Matt Wake described it as "the most Black Crowes sounding Black Crowes song of all time." Advocate-Messenger critic John Miles called it the best song on The Southern Harmony and Musical Companion, praising Harsh's keyboards as rivaling Ray Manzarek of the Doors and stating that "the lyrics do a good job of conveying Chris and Rich Robinson's feeling of a romantic relationship." American Songwriter critic Tina Benitez-Eves rated it as one of the Black Crowes' 10 best songs.

Released as a single, "Thorn in My Pride" peaked at number 80 on the US Billboard Hot 100. However, on August 22, 1992, it became the third of four number-one songs on the Billboard Album Rock Tracks chart from The Southern Harmony and Musical Companion, following "Remedy" and "Sting Me", and preceding "Hotel Illness". It ended 1992 as the ninth-most successful album rock song in the United States. In Canada, the song peaked at number 34 on the RPM 100 Hit Tracks chart.

"Thorn in My Pride" was included on the Black Crowes 2000 compilation album Greatest Hits 1990–1999: A Tribute to a Work in Progress....

== Live performances ==
As of 2014, the Black Crowes had played "Thorn in My Pride" live in concert almost 1000 times. The Robinsons also played it live on an acoustic concert tour they performed on their own in 2020.

== Charts ==
=== Weekly charts ===
Chart (1992)	Peak position
Canada Top Singles (RPM)	34
US Billboard Hot 100	80
US Mainstream Rock (Billboard)	1
US Top 100 Pop Singles (Cash Box)	77
US CHR (Radio & Records)	37

=== Year-end charts ===
Chart (1992)	Position
US Album Rock Tracks (Billboard)	9
