= A Conspiracy =

1994 single by the Black Crowes

Single by the Black Crowes

from the album Amorica
- Released: November 1994
- Length: 4:45
- Label: American
- Songwriters: Rich Robinson; Chris Robinson
- Producers: Jack Joseph Puig; The Black Crowes

The Black Crowes singles chronology
"Hotel Illness" (1992)	"A Conspiracy" (1994)	"Wiser Time" (1995)

"A Conspiracy" is a song written by Rich and Chris Robinson that was first released on the Black Crowes' 1994 album Amorica. The song reached number 54 in Canada, number 25 in the United Kingdom, and number 5 on the US Billboard Album Rock Tracks chart.

American Songwriter critic Tina Benitez-Eves rated "A Conspiracy" as being among the Black Crowes 10 best songs of all time. Classic Rock critic Dave Everley considered it one of the 20 songs that tell the story of the band, saying that "Its hip-swaying lead single plastered on the wah-wah and found a never-better Chris Robinson exhorting to the heavens like a sidewalk preacher." Allmusic critic Matthew Greenwald described "A Conspiracy" as "basic hard-rocking soul-drenched ballad" with "an incredible guitar arrangement" and "energy and overall grunge." Greenwald described the lyrics of "A Conspiracy" as having "a sense of dread and paranoia." Fellow Allmusic critic Tim Sendra described "A Conspiracy" as having "a little bit of jam band looseness" that's "counterbalanced by the intensity of [the band's] playing and by the intricate arrangements." Scripps Howard News Service critic Larry Nager described "A Conspiracy" as a "retread" of an earlier Black Crowes' song "Remedy". Daily News critic Jim Farber claimed that as the album's lead single, "A Conspiracy" "bored Top 40 pop radio and video outlets", hurting sales of the album." The Record critic Barbara Jaeger found it to be "formulaic and dull".

"A Conspiracy" was included on the Black Crowes' 2000 compilation album Greatest Hits 1990–1999: A Tribute to a Work in Progress... A live version of the song was included on the 2013 album Wiser for the Time.

== Charts ==
Chart (1995)	Peak position
Australia (ARIA)	62
Canada	54
UK	25
US Mainstream Rock (Billboard)	5
