= Sho' Nuff Live =

Live album by The Black Crowes
- Released: 1998
- Recorded: March 18–22, 1995
- Venue: Beacon Theatre (New York City)
- Genre: Blues-rock
- Length: 28:09
- Label: American

Sho' Nuff Live is an EP by The Black Crowes. It was recorded live at the Beacon Theatre in New York City from March 18 through March 22, 1995. It was included as a bonus disc on the Sho' Nuff box set in 1998.

== Track listing ==
All tracks written by Chris Robinson & Rich Robinson, except Hard to Handle written by Otis Redding, Allen Jones & Alvertis Isbell

1. "No Speak No Slave" – 5:12
2. "Sometimes Salvation" – 4:57
3. "Cursed Diamond" – 6:38
4. "Hard to Handle" – 4:30
5. "Remedy" – 6:50
