= Live at the Greek (Jimmy Page and The Black Crowes album) =

2000 live album

- original MusicMaker.com cover

Live album by Jimmy Page & The Black Crowes
- Released: 29 February 2000
- Recorded: 18–19 October 1999
- Venues: Greek Theatre, Los Angeles with Le Mobile Recording Facilities
- Genres: Blues rock, hard rock
- Length: 111:06
- Labels: MusicMaker.com; TVT
- Producer: Kevin Shirley

The Black Crowes chronology
By Your Side (1999)	Live at the Greek (2000)	Lions (2001)

Jimmy Page chronology
Walking into Clarksdale (1998)	Live at the Greek (2000)

Alternative cover
- TVT version

Professional ratings
Review scores
Source	Rating
AllMusic	3/5 stars
NME	(7/10)
PopMatters	(favorable)
Rolling Stone	3/5 stars
Uncut	4/5 stars

Live at the Greek is a live album by Jimmy Page and The Black Crowes, first released by MusicMaker.com on 29 February 2000, then reissued by TVT Records on 4 July 2000. An expanded and remastered version was released by The Orchard Records for the album's 25th anniversary, on 14 March 2025. Most of the tracks were recorded at the Greek Theatre in Los Angeles on 18/19 October 1999; songs performed included material from the Led Zeppelin and The Black Crowes catalogues plus old blues and rock standards.

Contractual restrictions from The Black Crowes’ record company prevented their own songs from being released on the first two versions of the album. The 25th anniversary edition restored those songs and added several more tracks.

== Original edition ==
The album was first released on 29 February 2000 with the full title Live at the Greek: Excess All Areas, via MusicMaker.com through an online process in which buyers could choose the running order of the songs, or accept a running order chosen by the company. A standard retail two-CD set was issued by TVT Records later the same year. That version included additional songs, an enhanced QuickTime video, and photographs taken during the concert. The Japanese version of the TVT release adds "Misty Mountain Hop" and "In the Light", recorded at a later show. Bassist Sven Pipien was fired between the two releases of the album and was airbrushed out of the group photograph in the centerfold of the TVT Records version and all subsequent vinyl reissues; session bassist Greg Rzab played on the later tracks. "Hey, Hey, What Can I Do" was released as a promotional single.

=== Track listing ===
==== MusicMaker.com version; standard running order ====
(see below for full songwriting information)

Disc one

1. "Heartbreaker" – 6:03
2. "In My Time of Dying" – 9:45
3. "What Is and What Should Never Be" – 5:31
4. "Custard Pie" – 5:26
5. "Celebration Day" – 3:38
6. "Out on the Tiles" / "Whole Lotta Love" (Medley) – 9:12
7. "Nobody's Fault but Mine" – 6:52
8. "You Shook Me" – 8:29

Disc two

1. "The Lemon Song" – 9:01
2. "Your Time Is Gonna Come" – 6:01
3. "Ten Years Gone" – 6:38
4. "Sick Again" – 4:39
5. "Hey Hey What Can I Do" – 3:39
6. "Shake Your Money Maker" – 4:31
7. "Woke Up This Morning" – 4:19
8. "Shapes of Things" – 3:18
9. "Sloppy Drunk" – 6:07
10. "Oh Well" – 4:24

==== TVT Records version ====
Disc one
No.	Title	Writer(s)	Length
1.	"Celebration Day"	John Paul Jones, Jimmy Page, Robert Plant	3:42
2.	"Custard Pie"	Page, Plant	5:18
3.	"Sick Again"	Page, Plant	4:34
4.	"What Is and What Should Never Be"	Page, Plant	5:26
5.	"Woke Up This Morning"	B.B. King, Jules Tuab	4:14
6.	"Shapes of Things"	Jim McCarty, Keith Relf, Paul Samwell-Smith	3:09
7.	"Sloppy Drunk"	Jimmy Rogers	6:05
8.	"Ten Years Gone"	Page, Plant	6:30
9.	"In My Time of Dying"	Traditional; arr./adap. John Bonham, Jones, Page, Plant	9:34
10.	"Your Time Is Gonna Come"	Jones, Page	6:02

Disc two
No.	Title	Writer(s)	Length
1.	"The Lemon Song"	Howlin' Wolf, Bonham, Jones, Page, Plant	8:59
2.	"Nobody's Fault but Mine"	Page, Plant	6:41
3.	"Heartbreaker"	Jones, Page, Plant	5:50
4.	"Hey, Hey What Can I Do"	Bonham, Jones, Page, Plant	3:30
5.	"Mellow Down Easy"	Willie Dixon	5:20
6.	"Oh, Well"	Peter Green	4:10
7.	"Shake Your Money Maker"	Elmore James	4:25
8.	"You Shook Me"	Dixon, J.B. Lenoir	8:25
9.	"Out on the Tiles"	Bonham, Page, Plant	3:39
10.	"Whole Lotta Love"	Bonham, Dixon, Jones, Page, Plant	5:34

Japanese bonus tracks
No.	Title	Writer(s)	Length
11.	"In the Light"	Jones, Page, Plant	9:07
12.	"Misty Mountain Hop"	Jones, Page, Plant	5:05

== 2025 reissue ==
Live at the Greek

Live album by Jimmy Page and The Black Crowes
- Released: 14 March 2025
- Recorded: 18–19 October 1999
- Venues: Greek Theatre, Los Angeles with Le Mobile Recording Facilities
- Genres: Blues rock, hard rock
- Length: 213:00
- Label: The Orchard Records
- Producer: Kevin Shirley

An expanded and remastered edition of the live album was released on 14 March 2025 by The Orchard Records, with the title simplified to Live at the Greek. This version adds the Black Crowes songs that were omitted from the original edition, plus several more Led Zeppelin songs and blues standards performed during the concerts in 1999.

=== Track listing ===
Disc one
No.	Title	Writer(s)	Length
1.	"Celebration Day"	Jones, Page, Plant	3:40
2.	"Custard Pie"	Page, Plant	5:23
3.	"Sick Again"	Page, Plant	4:47
4.	"No Speak No Slave"	Chris Robinson, Rich Robinson	4:43
5.	"Hard to Handle"	Allen Jones, Al Bell, Otis Redding	3:35
6.	"The Wanton Song"	Page, Plant	4:07
7.	"Misty Mountain Hop"	Jones, Page, Plant	4:54
8.	"Hots On for Nowhere"	Page, Plant	4:45
9.	"What Is and What Should Never Be"	Page, Plant	5:23
10.	"Wiser Time"	Robinson, Robinson	7:16
11.	"Mellow Down Easy"	Little Walter	5:21
12.	"Woke Up This Morning (My Baby She Was Gone)"	B.B. King, Jules Tuab	4:31
13.	"Ten Years Gone"	Page, Plant	6:32

Disc two
No.	Title	Writer(s)	Length
1.	"In My Time of Dying"	Bonham, Jones, Page, Plant, Blind Willie Johnson	9:40
2.	"Your Time Is Gonna Come"	Jones, Page	5:58
3.	"Remedy"	Robinson, Robinson	5:19
4.	"The Lemon Song"	Bonham, Jones, Page, Plant, Chester Burnett	8:54
5.	"In the Light"	Jones, Page, Plant	9:10
6.	"Shake Your Money Maker"	Elmore James	4:33
7.	"Sloppy Drunk Blues"	Jimmy Rogers	5:58
8.	"Shapes of Things"	Jim McCarty, Keith Relf, Paul Samwell-Smith	3:17
9.	"Nobody's Fault but Mine"	Page, Plant	6:48
10.	"Heartbreaker"	Bonham, Jones, Page, Plant	5:53
11.	"Bring It On Home"	Bonham, Jones, Page, Plant, Willie Dixon	5:23
12.	"She Talks to Angels"	Robinson, Robinson	5:48

Disc three
No.	Title	Writer(s)	Length
1.	"Oh Well"	Peter Green	4:31
2.	"Band Intros"		0:51
3.	"Hey, Hey, What Can I Do"	Bonham, Jones, Page, Plant	3:35
4.	"You Shook Me"	Dixon, Lenoir	8:30
5.	"Out on the Tiles"	Bonham, Page, Plant	3:42
6.	"Whole Lotta Love"	Bonham, Jones, Page, Plant, Dixon	5:50
7.	"Custard Pie (soundcheck)"	Page, Plant	5:04
8.	"You Shook Me (soundcheck)"	Dixon	8:28
9.	"The Lemon Song (soundcheck)"	Bonham, Jones, Page, Plant, Burnett	8:42
10.	"Ten Years Gone (soundcheck)"	Page, Plant	11:41
11.	"Jam (soundcheck)"		10:21

== Personnel ==
- Jimmy Page – electric and acoustic guitars
- Chris Robinson – vocals
- Rich Robinson – guitars, vocals
- Steve Gorman – drums
- Eddie Harsch – keyboards
- Audley Freed – guitars
- Sven Pipien – bass
- Greg Rzab – bass on "Misty Mountain Hop" and "In the Light"

Production

- Kevin Shirley – production, mixing
- Butch Belair – photography
- Ian R. Drury – inside booklet design
- J.C. & A.F. – art direction and design
- George Marino – mastering at Sterling Sound, New York
- Joe Newton – cover illustration

== Accolades ==
Accolades for Live at the Greek: Excess All Areas (2000)
Publication	Country	Accolade	Year	Rank
Buscadero	Italy	Critics Poll 2000	2000	19
Rumore	Italy	Top 20 Albums of 2000	2000	10
Classic Rock	UK	50 Greatest Live Albums Ever	2003	40

== Charts ==
Chart performance for Live at the Greek: Excess All Areas (2000)
Chart (2000)	Peak position
Australian Albums (ARIA)	72
Austrian Albums (Ö3 Austria)	37
Canada Top Albums/CDs (RPM)	27
Dutch Albums (Album Top 100)	46
Finnish Albums (Suomen virallinen lista)	27
French Albums (SNEP)	73
German Albums (Offizielle Top 100)	24
Italian Albums (FIMI)	37
New Zealand Albums (RMNZ)	45
Scottish Albums (Official Charts)	37
Swiss Albums (Schweizer Hitparade)	77
UK Albums (Official Charts)	39
US Billboard 200	64
US Independent Albums (Billboard)	2

== Certifications ==
Certifications for Live at the Greek: Excess All Areas
Region	Certification	Certified units/sales
United States (RIAA)	Gold	500,000^{^}
^{^} Shipments figures based on certification alone.
