= The Southern Harmony and Musical Companion =

Studio album by the Black Crowes
- Released: May 12, 1992
- Recorded: 1991–1992
- Studio: Southern Tracks Recording Std
- Genre: Blues rock
- Length: 50:33
- Label: Def American
- Producers: George Drakoulias; The Black Crowes

The Black Crowes chronology
Shake Your Money Maker (1990)	The Southern Harmony and Musical Companion (1992)	Amorica (1994)

Singles from The Southern Harmony and Musical Companion
- 1. "Remedy" Released: April 1992; 2. "Sting Me" Released: August 1992 (Aus); 3. "Thorn in My Pride" Released: August 1992 (US); 4. "Hotel Illness" Released: November 1992

The Southern Harmony and Musical Companion is the second studio album by American rock band the Black Crowes, released on May 12, 1992. It was the first album by the band to feature Marc Ford on lead guitar, replacing Jeff Cease, who was fired the year before, and the first to feature keyboardist Eddie Harsch. The album's name derives from the full name of the Southern Harmony, an influential 1835 hymnal compiled by William Walker.

== Release ==
It was a record for an album to feature four album rock number-one hits (previously set by Tom Petty in 1989, with three). The album itself reached the top spot of the Billboard 200 album chart, propelled by the success of these singles.

A box set featuring the remastered album along with previously unreleased songs and live tracks was released in late 2023.

== Reception ==
Professional ratings
Review scores
Source	Rating
AllMusic	4.5/5 stars
Entertainment Weekly	B+
Kerrang!	5/5
Mojo	4/5 stars
NME	9/10
PopMatters	8/10
Rolling Stone	3.5/5 stars
Select	5/5
Uncut	9/10
The Village Voice	B−

In 2005, The Southern Harmony and Musical Companion was ranked number 477 in Rock Hard magazine's book The 500 Greatest Rock & Metal Albums of All Time.

In 2006, the album was ranked number 100 on Guitar World magazine's list of the greatest 100 guitar albums of all time.

== Track listing ==
All tracks are written by Chris Robinson & Rich Robinson, except where noted.

No.	Title	Writer(s)	Length
1.	"Sting Me"		4:39
2.	"Remedy"		5:22
3.	"Thorn in My Pride"		6:03
4.	"Bad Luck Blue Eyes Goodbye"		6:28
5.	"Sometimes Salvation"		4:44
6.	"Hotel Illness"		3:59
7.	"Black Moon Creeping"		4:54
8.	"No Speak No Slave"		4:01
9.	"My Morning Song"		6:15
10.	"Time Will Tell"	Bob Marley	4:08

Bonus tracks (1998 reissue)
No.	Title	Writer(s)	Length
11.	"Sting Me" (Slow)		5:48
12.	"99 lbs."	Don Bryant	4:18

Japanese bonus track
No.	Title	Writer(s)	Length
11.	"Shake 'Em On Down" (Live)	Bukka White	4:08

== Personnel ==
The Black Crowes

- Chris Robinson – vocals, percussion, blues harp, guitar
- Rich Robinson – guitar
- Marc Ford – guitar
- Johnny Colt – bass guitar
- Steve Gorman – drums
- Eddie Harsch – keyboards

Additional musicians

- Chris Trujillo – congas
- Barbara Mitchell and Taj Harmon (now Taj Artis) – choir

Production

- Pete Angelus – personal manager
- The Black Crowes – producer
- George Drakoulias – producer
- Janet Levinson – art direction
- Brendan O'Brien – engineer, mixing
- Chris Robinson – art direction
- Mark Seliger – photography
- Howie Weinberg – mastering

== Charts ==
=== Weekly charts ===
Chart (1992)	Peak position
Australian Albums (ARIA)	6
Austrian Albums (Ö3 Austria)	39
Canada Top Albums/CDs (RPM)	2
Dutch Albums (Album Top 100)	17
Finnish Albums (The Official Finnish Charts)	14
German Albums (Offizielle Top 100)	30
New Zealand Albums (RMNZ)	4
Norwegian Albums (VG-lista)	9
Swedish Albums (Sverigetopplistan)	17
Swiss Albums (Schweizer Hitparade)	17
UK Albums (Official Charts)	2
US Billboard 200	1

=== Year-end charts ===
Chart (1992)	Position
Dutch Albums (Album Top 100)	52
US Billboard 200	41
Chart (1993)	Position
Dutch Albums (Album Top 100)	100

== Certifications ==
Region	Certification	Certified units/sales
Australia (ARIA)	Gold	35,000^{^}
Canada (Music Canada)	Platinum	100,000^{^}
New Zealand (RMNZ)	Gold	7,500^{^}
United States (RIAA)	2× Platinum	2,000,000^{^}
^{^} Shipments figures based on certification alone.
