= Lions (album) =

Studio album by the Black Crowes
- Released: May 7, 2001
- Recorded: January–February 2001 at Montana Rehearsal Studios and Theater 99 Recording in New York City
- Genres: Southern rock, blues rock, hard rock
- Length: 55:09
- Label: V2
- Producer: Don Was

The Black Crowes chronology
By Your Side (1999)	Lions (2001)	Warpaint (2008)

Singles from Lions
- 1. "Lickin'" Released: May 14, 2001 (UK); 2. "Soul Singing" Released: July 23, 2001 (UK)

Lions is the sixth studio album by American rock band the Black Crowes. It was released in 2001 as their first album on V2 Records following their departure from Columbia, and is their only studio album to feature guitarist Audley Freed. Lions was recorded in New York City in January and February of that year, and was produced by Don Was. Bass guitar duties were shared by Rich Robinson and Was, as Greg Rzab had left the band and was not replaced until the tour that followed the release of the album.

The album debuted on the Billboard 200 at its peak position of 20, selling more than 53,000 copies in its first week. Lions received mixed reviews; although the overall sound of the album generally garnered praise, a frequent complaint was the lack of "memorable" songs. The critics who rated Lions lowest considered it a poor imitation of the band's influences, such as Led Zeppelin.

The band supported Lions with two North American tours (one with Oasis co-headlining), and a short tour of Europe and Japan in between. Soundboard recordings of several concerts were available for download to those who owned the album. Following the tour, the band went on hiatus until 2005.

== Background ==
The Black Crowes began writing songs for the follow-up to their 1999 album By Your Side as free agents, having left Columbia Records through a loophole in their contract. The decision to leave was driven by Columbia's promotion of By Your Side. According to band member Rich Robinson, "That record was destined to fail because ... [Columbia executives] just said, 'It's not going to do well ... It's no use wasting time or money.' " The band also was frustrated by the label's request for albums sounding similar to their first, 1990's Shake Your Money Maker.

In late 1999, lead vocalist Chris Robinson began a relationship with Kate Hudson, which would influence subtly the lyrics on Lions. The pair met at a Friday night party in Manhattan, which led to a Saturday stroll through Central Park and a Sunday move-in. Their wedding at the Aspen, Colorado, ranch of Kurt Russell and Kate's mother, Goldie Hawn, followed on December 31, 2000.

Before the 2000 tour with Jimmy Page, bassist Sven Pipien was fired after arriving late for a performance and missing the return flight. Rich said it was not enough to warrant termination, but Pipien's defensiveness when confronted about the incident was too much to handle. Greg Rzab and Andy Hess were considered as replacements; the band chose Rzab because he had more touring experience than Hess. Rzab, however, departed before the recording of Lions.

In mid-2000, the band signed with Richard Branson's V2 Records. Rich explained, "The cool thing about V2, the reason that we chose them, is that they told us, 'You guys go make the record you want to make. Then give it to us and we'll sell it.' That's what we needed to hear." The freedom V2 afforded through its hands-off approach influenced not only the music, but the album title as well. According to Chris, "Lions is a symbol that stands for the fierce feeling and freedom that music allows you."

== Writing and production ==
Chris Robinson granted that the experience of playing Led Zeppelin songs with Jimmy Page influenced Lions, but not on a song-by-song basis. "Led Zeppelin's music is very dramatic and very dynamic. That's something we've attempted to do with our style also. I think it definitely affected how we make our music." Funk and R&B were bigger influences than on past albums, and "Miracle to Me" was influenced by Nick Drake.

Chris claimed Kate Hudson's influence on his lyrics was subtle: "More so than a literal reference to her, it's the vantage point from where I'm writing. It's the reasons that I'm singing and it's the feeling. That is an influence far greater than the literal influence." He did grant, however, that "Soul Singing" and "Miracle to Me" were written with Hudson in mind, and explained that the album's track order roughly follows a path from confusion to clarity that mirrored his own. Producer Don Was said of Chris, "I realized he was taking on something that was significant. He was writing about becoming a man ... There's a lot of old man/young man symbolism that's a self-conversation ... I don't know that anyone has actually chronicled being 33 [years old] as well as this album."

"Soul Singing"
Chris believed "Soul Singing" sufficed with one instrumental section throughout. Rich argued a second section was needed. This 23-second sample contains distinctly different verse and chorus; thus, Rich won the argument.

Heated discussions during the writing of Lions were rare, owing to the Robinson brothers' usual method in which Rich writes the music and Chris writes the lyrics. "Soul Singing" was the only song to cause disagreement; "I'd written this part where although the vocals changed the music stayed the same throughout. I thought we should add something or just not finish it, but Chris thought it was already a song, and a good one. So we talked about that one for a while", Rich recalled.

The Black Crowes had previously sent Was demos to interest him in producing By Your Side, but Was believed the demos were good enough to be the album. Columbia Records disagreed with Was's assessment, however, leading to Kevin Shirley's hiring. With complete artistic control under V2 Records, the band was free to hire Was for Lions. Recording took place in January and February 2001 at Montana Rehearsal Studios and Theater 99 Recording in New York City. The recording sessions progressed as smoothly as the writing; only "Come On" caused conflict between the band and Was. Rich acknowledged, "We must have recorded 'Come On' about five times in different ways ... Then [Was] just took it away with him and came back with this different mix", which impressed the band, leading to its inclusion on the album. The band ultimately was satisfied by the recording experience, finding that Was was devoted to helping realize their vision for the album rather than imposing his own.

The sessions were recorded on tape and Pro-Tools simultaneously; the band ultimately chose to use the tape version, as they preferred its sound quality. Most songs were recorded live with the band members playing together in one room, and microphones set up to capture the overall sound rather than that of individual instruments. Was felt this approach best approximated the feel of a Black Crowes concert, later noting that the Lions songs debuted at a private show in February 2001 "sounded exactly like the record." Most of the recordings that comprise the album were recorded during preproduction, the purpose of which was to test arrangements. "[W]e didn't think we were recording the record. And it turned out to be great" said Rich. Audley Freed played guitar on only three tracks because Rich did not want "the meat of the song, which is the riff", to get lost in a "wall of sound". Though Rich brought his entire collection of guitars and a number of amplifiers, he mostly recorded with a 1954 Fender Esquire through a Harry Joyce amp. To achieve a resonator-like tone on "Soul Singing", he used a James Trussart metal-bodied electric. The distinctive guitar riff on "Lickin'" was achieved by Rich using the pickup selector on a Les Paul as a kill switch - by turning down the volume on the neck pickup and then switching between the bridge and neck pickups he was able to achieve a staccato effect when playing the riff with just his fretting hand. Since Andy Hess did not join the Black Crowes until the above private show, the band did not have a bassist during the recording sessions; Rich thus played bass on most tracks. On "Lay It All on Me", however, Rich played piano, leaving the bass guitar duties to Don Was.

A total of 20 songs were recorded during the Lions sessions. Of the seven cut from the album, four were mixed and mastered for potential release; three ("Last Time Again," "Love Is Now" and "Sleepyheads") appeared as B-sides, and the other ("The Pretty Gurl Song") circulates on a bootleg recording.

== Promotion and release ==
Soon after the Lions sessions, V2 Records threw a "completion party" at The Bank in New York City, at which the Black Crowes performed four songs from the new album, five songs from their catalog and a cover of Fleetwood Mac's "Oh Well". The band then played scattered dates in the U.S. and UK, including an appearance on Later... with Jools Holland, ahead of Lions' release. During this sequence of concerts, every song from the album was performed except "Losing My Mind" and "Ozone Mama"; the remaining two would be played on the album-supporting tour.

Lions was released on May 7, 2001, in the UK and a day later in the U.S.; it subsequently debuted at its peak position of number 20 on the Billboard 200 chart, and sold over 53,000 copies in its first week. As of January 2002, the album had sold 192,000 copies in the U.S.

Around the album's release, band members made numerous promotional appearances. Chris Robinson guested on The Daily Show with Jon Stewart the day before the album was released in the U.S., and Chris and Steve Gorman appeared on The Howard Stern Show the following day. The band performed "Soul Singing" on The Tonight Show with Jay Leno on May 10, and was inducted into Hollywood's RockWalk four days later. A second late night television performance of "Soul Singing" took place on June 6, this time on the Late Show with David Letterman.

"Lickin'" was the first single from the album; it peaked at number 9 on Billboard's Mainstream Rock Tracks on May 19. The song's promotional video was a compilation of various takes of a static, low-angle shot of the band performing the song on a tiny stage. Second single "Soul Singing" peaked at number 12 on the same chart on August 18; its promotional video featured the band playing in a grassy field as the sun rises in the sky. A third single, "Miracle to Me", was canceled, but not before a promotional video was shot of the band ostensibly recording the song in a studio. Videos also were filmed for "Come On", "Greasy Grass River" and "Cypress Tree". Despite not playing on the album, Andy Hess appears in some of these videos, all of which are available as streaming media on the band's official website.

== Critical reception ==
Professional ratings
Aggregate scores
Source	Rating
Metacritic	50/100
Review scores
Source	Rating
AllMusic	3/5 stars
dotmusic	3/5 stars
Entertainment Weekly	C−
The Gazette	3.5/4 stars
Herald Sun	0/5 stars
NME	1/10
Playlouder	1.5/5 stars
Rolling Stone	3.5/5 stars
Sonicnet	3/5 stars
Wall of Sound	53/100

Media reviews of Lions were mixed. Numerous writers detected a Led Zeppelin influence (which was praised by some, but panned by others) and attributed it to the Black Crowes' recent tour with Jimmy Page. Dave McKenna, writing for The Washington Post, compared Steve Gorman's drumming to that of John Bonham and found analogs to specific guitar and keyboard tones in Led Zeppelin albums. Nigel Williamson of The Times found similarities in Chris Robinson's voice on "Come On" to that of Robert Plant, and wrote that the song "could almost be a Led Zeppelin II cast off." Other reviewers noted similarities to Aerosmith; Howard Cohen of The Miami Herald called "Lickin'" "the best Aerosmith single that band hasn't recorded in years." The perceived lack of originality, though, turned off some critics. The Herald Sun's Andrew McUtchen inferred "the Black Crowes are unaware it's no longer the '70s and after one listen to Lions ... it's clear someone should tell them." Everett True of Playlouder concurred, writing "It's blindingly obvious the Crowes are imitators, and always will be", though Elysa Gardner, writing for USA Today, recognized the band "exhibit an energy and dexterity that compensate—at least somewhat—for their lack of invention."

"Young Man, Old Man"
25-second sample from "Young Man, Old Man" containing portions of the introduction (compared to "Sympathy for the Devil" by John Milward of Sonicnet) and the verse (called a "'Freddie's Dead' vamp" by Teresa Gubbins of The Dallas Morning News)

Many reviewers praised the sound of Lions but felt the songs were weak. Writing for dotmusic, John Mulvey highlighted the "gutsy, no-messing sound", but appreciated "Cosmic Friend" for being "as impressively mad as you'd hope, too, beginning like Beatles psychedelia, taking in massive Brazilian drumming and a touch of pedal steel, before coalescing into furious heavy rock." Stephen Thomas Erlewine of AllMusic described Lions as a "powerful, textured hard rock record that covers a lot of ground, surging from powerful riffs to gospel choruses and funkier-than-expected riffs", though he also complained that "the songs can seem incomplete." Critics disagreed on which songs were lacking, though. "Losing My Mind" and "Young Man, Old Man" were called "highlights" by Jane Stevenson of the Toronto Sun, though elsewhere the former was called "woeful" and the latter a "'Freddie's Dead' vamp" that should have been skipped.

The lyrics of Lions were another target for the critics. Mark Beaumont of NME stated that the eloquence ends at the "Come awn come awn!/Everyone!" chorus of "Come On", and Stephen Thompson of The A.V. Club bemoaned that "hoary tropes abound".

== Concert tours ==
Shortly after the release of Lions, the Black Crowes and Oasis, with opening band Spacehog, embarked on a co-headlining tour of North American theaters and amphitheaters. The Black Crowes had previously met Liam and Noel Gallagher and hit it off; "... so we called them and asked them if they were interested [in touring together]. And so they were like, 'Yeah, we'd love to!'" said Rich. The Black Crowes performed last each night, and their seventy-five-minute set always included numerous songs from Lions. Members of Oasis typically would join them for an encore cover such as "Lucifer Sam", "Can't You Hear Me Knocking" or "Road Runner".

The Black Crowes followed the tour with one-off dates and festivals across Europe and Japan, including shows opening for Neil Young. Most of these shows, as well as most of the dates with Oasis, were made available by V2 Records as soundboard recordings. With Lions loaded in a CD-ROM drive, one could stream each show, as well as download one live track per week and one show in its entirety.

Following a month-long break, the group returned to the road in late August for their Listen Massive Tour, with Beachwood Sparks as the opening band. The tour was billed as a return to two-hour shows featuring a rotating set list. The September 11 show at the Greek Theatre in Los Angeles was canceled, but the band performed the next evening in Tucson, Arizona, as scheduled. All profits and merchandise sales from the following week's three shows at the Beacon Theatre in New York City were donated to the New York State World Trade Center Relief Fund and the New York City Public/Private Initiative. While in New York City, Chris and Rich performed "By Your Side" on Late Night with Conan O'Brien. The Listen Massive Tour concluded with a 140-minute show at the Orpheum Theatre in Boston, Massachusetts, on October 31. This would be Andy Hess and Audley Freed's last show as band members, as the Black Crowes went on hiatus shortly thereafter.

== Track listing ==
All songs written by Rich and Chris Robinson.

1. "Midnight from the Inside Out" – 4:21
2. "Lickin'" – 3:42
3. "Come On" – 2:58
4. "No Use Lying" – 4:57
5. "Losing My Mind" – 4:26
6. "Ozone Mama" – 3:54
7. "Greasy Grass River" – 3:20
8. "Soul Singing" – 3:54
9. "Miracle to Me" – 4:42
10. "Young Man, Old Man" – 4:14
11. "Cosmic Friend" – 5:23
12. "Cypress Tree" – 3:41
13. "Lay It All on Me" – 5:29

Japanese version

14. "Love Is Now" – 4:22

== Personnel ==
The Black Crowes

- Chris Robinson – vocals, harmonica
- Rich Robinson – guitar, bass guitar, piano on "Lay It All on Me", vocals
- Steve Gorman – drums, percussion
- Ed Harsch – keyboards
- Audley Freed – guitar (on "Ozone Mama", "Greasy Grass River", & the outro of "Young Man, Old Man" only)

Additional musicians

- Don Was – bass guitar on "Come On" and "Lay It All on Me"
- Teese Gohl – string arrangement
- Craig Ross – lead guitar on "Greasy Grass River"
- Maxine Waters, Oren Waters, Rose Stone and Julie Waters – background vocals on "Soul Singing"

Production

- Don Was – producer
- Pete Angelus – personal manager
- Amy Finkle – management
- Chris Ribando – recording (Montana Rehearsal Studio and Theater 99)
- Ray Martin – recording (Theater 99)
- Raeann Zschokke – recording assistant
- The Sickamore Avenue High School Mixing Squad – mixing (The Record Plant and Electric Lady Studios)
  - Don Was
  - Chris Ribando
  - Adam Olmstead
  - Steve Mandel – mixing assistant
- Chris Lord-Alge – mixing ("Come On", "Losing My Mind" and "Soul Singing")
- Derek Phelps – guitar tech
- John "Noodles" Weber – drum tech
- Jane Oppenheimer – minister of information
- Jennifer Gunderson – production coordinator
- Ron Kimball Studios – cover photograph
- Zoren Gold – photography
- Minori – retouching
- V2 Image Control – art direction

== Charts ==
Chart (2001)	Peak position
Australian Albums (ARIA)	74
Canada Billboard Top Canadian Albums	20
Dutch Albums Chart	78
France Album Chart	141
Germany Album Chart	66
Scottish Albums Chart	30
Sweden Album Chart	51
UK Albums Chart	37
US Billboard 200	20
US Billboard Top Internet Albums	8
