= Audley Freed =

American guitarist (born 1962)

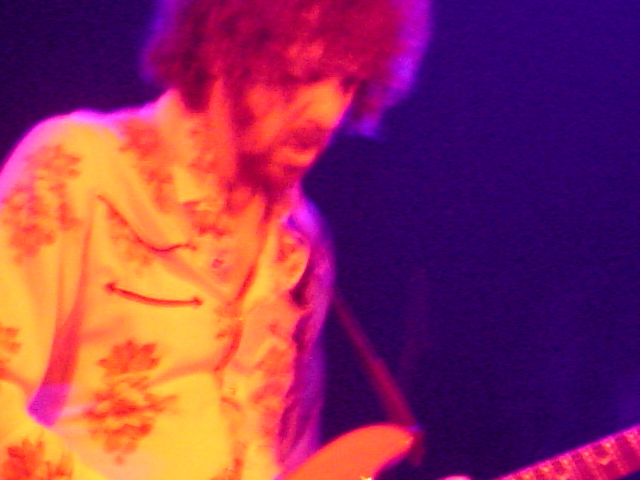
- Freed playing with New Earth Mud on June 28, 2004 at Irving Plaza, New York City

Background information
- Born: October 5, 1962 (age 64); Burgaw, North Carolina, U.S.
- Genres: Blues rock Hard rock Southern rock Roots rock Jam rock
- Occupations: Musician; songwriter; singer
- Instruments: Electric guitar; slide guitar
- Years active: 1989–present
- Label: Columbia

Audley Freed (born October 5, 1962) is an American guitarist, singer and songwriter. He is best known for being the founding member of the rock band Cry of Love and as a lead guitarist for The Black Crowes.

== Early life, family and education ==
Freed's father was in the US Army, so the family relocated often during his early years. Eventually the family settled in Burgaw, North Carolina in the 1970s. He took guitar lessons in Wilmington, North Carolina, for a couple years.

He graduated from University of North Carolina, Wilmington, with a history degree.

== Career ==
Freed started his professional music career on the Southeastern club ( The Point band ) and fraternity circuit. He then formed the band Cry of Love, which was signed to Columbia Records and released the debut album Brother. The album spawned two number-one and two top-10 album-oriented rock (AOR) hits, including “Peace Pipe,” named by Billboard as one of the “top 50 AOR songs of all time.” Following a second Columbia release, Diamonds and Debris, and another Freed-penned AOR hit, the band was dissolved.

Soon after, Freed joined The Black Crowes on lead guitar. His tenure in the Crowes included tours in the US, Asia and Europe, recording the album Lions and sharing the stage with Led Zeppelin guitarist Jimmy Page in a collaboration that led to the gold-record-certified Page–Crowes Live at the Greek album.

A frequent onstage guest at Gov't Mule shows, Freed co-wrote and recorded ”Life on the Outside,” a song on their album The Deep End, Volume 1, which featured Sly and the Family Stone bassist Larry Graham. Freed also appears in the companion documentary Rising Low Freed also plays guitar on the 2008 Gov't Mule release, Holy Haunted House, where they collaborate on a complete live rendition of Led Zeppelin's fifth album, Houses of the Holy. Freed is also a frequent guest guitarist at the annual Warren Haynes Presents The Christmas Jam, a benefit for Habitat for Humanity, taking place each December in Asheville, North Carolina.

In early 2003, Freed joined guitarist-singer Alvin Youngblood Hart and his Cry Of Love bandmate Robert Kearns in the rock quartet Job Cain; both played on Hart's 2005 Motivational Speaker album. Freed joined Black Crowes frontman Chris Robinson in 2004 for Robinson's solo project, New Earth Mud. Freed co-wrote and performed on the album This Magnificent Distance, and he played lead guitar on the subsequent tour. Aerosmith lead guitarist Joe Perry tapped Freed as the guitarist for his band following the release of his self-titled solo album in 2005. Freed joined the Dixie Chicks in 2006 for their Accidents and Accusations tour, which took them to the U.S., Canada, Europe and Australia and culminated in a performance at the 2007 Grammy Awards.

Freed has written songs recorded by rock band Train and country singer Gary Allan, among others. He is an active session player in Nashville. Other recordings include songs by The Wreckers, the Dixie Chicks, and Gavin DeGraw. He also toured with Peter Frampton.

Starting in May 2008, Freed toured with Jakob Dylan as part of the Gold Mountain Rebels trio, which also featured Wallflowers drummer Fred Eltringham, and former New Earth Mud bandmate George Reif on bass and background vocals. This tour supported the release of Dylan's solo album Seeing Things. On May 8, 2008, Dylan and the Gold Mountain Rebels appeared on Nissan Live Sets. Freed toured with Court Yard Hounds and the Dixie Chicks in January 2010.

He was a founding member of Trigger Hippy, featuring Joan Osborne, Steve Gorman, Jackie Greene, and Nick Govrik. Former member Jimmy Herring left the band before Greene and Osborne joined, due to commitments with Widespread Panic. Freed left the group in March 2012, with singer/songwriter Will Kimbrough replacing him.

As of 2014, Freed is a member of the band Big Hat.

In 2016, Freed played with Sheryl Crow and Grace Potter in a salute to Glenn Frey at the Rock and Roll Hall of Fame Ceremony.

== Discography ==
=== With Cry of Love ===
- Brother – 1993
- Diamonds and Debris - 1997

=== With The Black Crowes ===
- Live at the Greek – 2000
- Lions – 2001

=== With Trigger Hippy ===
- Trigger Hippy – 2014
