= Wiser Time =

1995 single by the Black Crowes

Single by the Black Crowes

from the album Amorica
- Released: July 10, 1995
- Genre: Country soul
- Length: 5:33
- Label: American
- Songwriters: Rich Robinson; Chris Robinson
- Producers: Jack Joseph Puig; The Black Crowes

The Black Crowes singles chronology
"High Head Blues" (1995)	"Wiser Time" (1995)	"One Mirror Too Many" (1995)

"Wiser Time" is a song by American rock band the Black Crowes, included on the band's third studio album, Amorica (1994). The song reached number 15 in Canada, number 34 in the United Kingdom, and number seven on the US Billboard Album Rock Tracks chart. American Songwriter critic Tina Benitez-Eves rated it as being one the Black Crowes 10 best songs of all time. Classic Rock critic Dave Everley considered it one of the 20 songs that tell the story of the band, calling it one of "the Crowes’ most stirring numbers" and describing it as "Sadness and longing wrapped up in sweetness and slide guitar." Everley also noted that the song's roots are in country rock music. Music & Media described Rich and Chris Robinson's vocal harmony on the song as "perfection". Allmusic critic Tim Sendra praised its guitar playing and for its "affecting" vocal performance.

== Track listings ==
CD 1

1. "Wiser Time" – [Robinson] – 5:33
2. "Wiser Time" (edit) – [Robinson/Robinson] – 4:22
3. "Jealous Again" (acoustic) – [Robinson/Robinson] – 4:24
4. "Non Fiction" (acoustic) – [Robinson/Robinson] – 5:21
5. "Thorn in My Pride" (acoustic) – [Robinson/Robinson] – 6:08

CD 2

1. "Wiser Time" (edit) – [Robinson/Robinson] – 4:18
2. "Wiser Time" (rock radio remix) – [Robinson/Robinson] – 4:19
3. "Wiser Time" (album version) – [Robinson/Robinson] – 6:04
4. "Chevrolet" – [Ed Young/Lonnie Young] – 3:29
5. "She Talks to Angels" (acoustic) – [Robinson/Robinson] – 6:18

== Charts ==
Chart (1995)	Peak position
Australia (ARIA)	133
Canada Top Singles (RPM)	15
Europe (Eurochart Hot 100)	89
Scottish Singles Sales (Official Charts)	34
UK Singles (Official Charts)	34
UK Rock & Metal (Official Charts)	1
US Mainstream Rock (Billboard)	7

== Release history ==
Region	Date	Format(s)	Label(s)	Ref(s).
United States	April 3, 1995	Progressive rock; alternative radio	American	
United Kingdom	July 10, 1995	CD; cassette	American	
