= Sting Me =

1992 single by the Black Crowes

Single by the Black Crowes

from the album The Southern Harmony and Musical Companion
- B-side: "Rainy Day Women (No. 12 & 35)"
- Released: August 10, 1992
- Genre: Rock
- Length: 4:39
- Label: Def American
- Songwriters: Chris Robinson, Rich Robinson
- Producers: George Drakoulias, the Black Crowes

The Black Crowes singles chronology
"Remedy" (1992)	"Sting Me" (1992)	"Thorn in My Pride" (1992)

Music video
- "Sting Me" on YouTube

"Sting Me" is a song by American rock band the Black Crowes. It is the opening track on the band's second studio album, The Southern Harmony and Musical Companion, and was released in August 1992 as its second commercial single. The song reached number one on the US Billboard Album Rock Tracks chart, where it remained for two weeks, and was the second of four singles from the album to top the Album Rock chart. A music video was also filmed for the song, featuring the band performing at a marijuana legalization rally.

== Track listings ==
UK CD1

1. "Sting Me"
2. "Jealous Again" (live)
3. "Seeing Things" (live)
4. "Boomers Story" (live)

UK CD2

1. "Sting Me"
2. "She Talks to Angels" (live)
3. "Thorn in My Pride" (live)
4. "Darling of the Underground Press" (live)

UK 7-inch and cassette single

1. "Sting Me"
2. "Rainy Day Women (No. 12 & 35)"

Australian CD single

1. "Sting Me"
2. "Rainy Day Women (No. 12 & 35)"
3. "Twice As Hard" (remix)
4. "Jealous Guy" (live)

Japanese CD single

1. "Sting Me"
2. "Rainy Day Women (No. 12 & 35)"
3. "She Talks to Angels" (live)
4. "Boomers Story" (live)

== Charts ==
=== Weekly charts ===
Chart (1992)	Peak position
Australia (ARIA)	59
UK Singles (Official Charts)	42
US Mainstream Rock (Billboard)	1

=== Year-end charts ===
Chart (1992)	Position
US Album Rock Tracks (Billboard)	33

== Release history ==
Region	Date	Format(s)	Label(s)	Ref.
Australia	August 10, 1992	CD; cassette	Def American	
United Kingdom	September 7, 1992	7-inch vinyl; CD1; cassette	Def American	
United Kingdom	September 21, 1992	CD2	Def American	
Japan	September 26, 1992	CD	Def American	
