= Amorica =

- The original cover of the album.

Studio album by The Black Crowes
- Released: November 1, 1994
- Recorded: May–August 1994
- Genres: Hard rock; boogie rock
- Length: 54:13
- Label: American
- Producers: Jack Joseph Puig; The Black Crowes

The Black Crowes chronology
The Southern Harmony and Musical Companion (1992)	Amorica (1994)	Three Snakes and One Charm (1996)

Censored cover
- Editions sold by big box retailers have a cropped image.

Amorica (stylized as amorica.) is the third studio album by American rock band The Black Crowes. The album was released on November 1, 1994 by American Recordings. Amorica reached gold status in the United States, shipping 500,000 copies. It reached no. 11 on the Billboard albums chart in the United States and made the charts in several other countries as well.

== Description ==
After touring behind their 1992 album The Southern Harmony and Musical Companion, the Black Crowes began developing a new album in 1993 to be titled Tall, but dissatisfaction with the early recordings resulted in the band reconceptualizing the album and re-recording several songs in a more relaxed style, resulting in the Amorica album that was released the following year.

The album cover notably featured a close-up photo of the pelvic region of a woman wearing a United States flag bikini bottom with pubic hair showing at the top. The photo was taken from the cover of the July 1976 issue of Hustler magazine. The album with this cover was subsequently banned from chain stores like Walmart and Kmart, resulting in the cover being censored with a solid black background displaying only the garment.

Other songs recorded during the Amorica sessions were "Feathers," "Tied Up and Swallowed" and "Chevrolet" (a Taj Mahal cover), which were later released as B-sides, bonus tracks or on compilation albums. Those tracks and others were compiled in a 2025 reissue of the album, which includes songs from the aborted Tall album plus additional studio outakes and live recordings from the period.

== Reception ==
Professional ratings
Review scores
Source	Rating
AllMusic	5/5 stars
Chicago Tribune	2.5/4 stars
Entertainment Weekly	B−
Kerrang!	5/5
Los Angeles Times	3/4 stars
NME	8/10
Q	4/5 stars
Rolling Stone	4/5 stars
Select	4/5
Uncut	9/10

The album received generally positive reviews upon its release. "The Crowes haven't ceased their cocky pillaging of the universal jukebox – echoes of the Stones and Led Zep abound," wrote Rolling Stone's Paul Evans, who awarded the album three and a half stars. "But in joining the mix with offbeat kicks (Latino rhythms, wah-wah guitar, strange vocal treatments), they sound remarkably fresh." Tim Sendra from AllMusic noted the change in sound from the band's first two hit albums, with Amorica displaying more jam band-like experimentation when the band could have followed their career trajectory into more mainstream sounds.

In July 2014, Guitar World chose Amorica as one of "50 Iconic Albums That Defined 1994", placing it at 50th place.

Three songs from Amorica made the top 10 on the Billboard Album Rock Tracks chart – "A Conspiracy" peaked at #5, "Wiser Time" peaked at #7 and "High Head Blues" peaked at #8. American Songwriter critic Tina Benitez-Eves ranked both "A Conspiracy" and "Wiser Time" as being among the Black Crowes 10 best songs. Allmusic critic Tim Sendra described "A Conspiracy" as having "a little bit of jam band looseness" that's "counterbalanced by the intensity of [the band's] playing and by the intricate arrangements." Daily News critic Jim Farber claimed that as the album's lead single, "A Conspiracy" "bored Top 40 pop radio and video outlets", hurting sales of the album. Music critic Larry Nager described "High Head Blues" as "the song in which the band's love of '60s and '70s retro finally comes together in a sound all its own." The Record critic Barbara Jaeger praised the way "High Head Blues" weaved together guitars, percussion and keyboards. Sendra praised "Wiser Time" for its guitar playing and for its "affecting" vocal performance.

== Track listing ==
All tracks are written by Chris Robinson and Rich Robinson.

Amorica track listing
No.	Title	Length
1.	"Gone"	5:08
2.	"A Conspiracy"	4:46
3.	"High Head Blues"	4:01
4.	"Cursed Diamond"	5:56
5.	"Nonfiction"	4:16
6.	"She Gave Good Sunflower"	5:48
7.	"P. 25 London"	3:38
8.	"Ballad in Urgency"	5:39
9.	"Wiser Time"	5:33
10.	"Downtown Money Waster"	3:40
11.	"Descending"	5:42

UK bonus track
No.	Title	Length
12.	"Tied Up and Swallowed"	4:16

Japanese bonus track
No.	Title	Length
12.	"Chevrolet"	3:32

1998 reissue bonus tracks
No.	Title	Length
12.	"Song of the Flesh"	3:45
13.	"Sunday Night Buttermilk Waltz"	2:46

== Personnel ==
The Black Crowes

- Chris Robinson – vocals, harmonica
- Rich Robinson – guitar
- Marc Ford – guitar
- Johnny Colt – bass guitar
- Steve Gorman – drums
- Eddie Harsch – keyboards

Additional personnel

- Jimmy Ashhurst – mandolin
- Eric Bobo – percussion
- Bruce Kaphan – pedal steel guitar
- Andy Sturmer – "assorted musical gifts"

Production

- Pete Angelus – personal manager
- The Black Crowes – producer
- Bob Ludwig – mastering
- Jack Joseph Puig – producer, engineer, mixer
- Jeff Sheehan – assistant engineer

== Charts ==
Chart performance for Amorica
Chart (1994)	Peak position
Australian Albums (ARIA)	11
Canada Top Albums/CDs (RPM)	13
Dutch Albums (Album Top 100)	17
Finnish Albums (The Official Finnish Charts)	17
German Albums (Offizielle Top 100)	40
New Zealand Albums (RMNZ)	39
Scottish Albums (Official Charts)	7
Swedish Albums (Sverigetopplistan)	25
Swiss Albums (Schweizer Hitparade)	35
UK Albums (Official Charts)	8
US Billboard 200	11

== Certifications ==
Certifications for Amorica
Region	Certification	Certified units/sales
United Kingdom (BPI)	Silver	60,000^{^}
United States (RIAA)	Gold	500,000^{^}
^{^} Shipments figures based on certification alone.
