= Jealous Again (song) =

1990 single by the Black Crowes

Single by the Black Crowes

from the album Shake Your Money Maker
- B-side: "Thick N' Thin"; "Waitin' Guilty"
- Released: January 30, 1990
- Genre: Blues rock
- Length: 4:35
- Label: Def American
- Songwriters: Chris Robinson, Rich Robinson
- Producer: George Drakoulias

The Black Crowes singles chronology
"Jealous Again" (1990)	"Hard to Handle" (1990)

Music video
- "Jealous Again" on YouTube

"Jealous Again" is the debut single of American band the Black Crowes, released as the lead single from their 1990 debut album, Shake Your Money Maker. The song reached number 75 on the US Billboard Hot 100 and number five on the Billboard Album Rock Tracks charts. It also charted in Australia, Canada, the Netherlands, and the United Kingdom throughout 1990 and 1991.

A music video directed by Pete Angelus was shot to promote the single, which is included in the box set Sho' Nuff. The song was included on the greatest hits compilation Greatest Hits 1990–1999: A Tribute to a Work in Progress, as well as the live albums Freak 'n' Roll...Into the Fog: The Black Crowes All Join Hands, The Fillmore, San Francisco and Wiser for the Time. An acoustic rendition of the song is also featured on Croweology, which included nineteen newly recorded versions of the Black Crowes' most popular songs.

== Gretchen Wilson lawsuit ==
On July 30, 2008, the Black Crowes filed a lawsuit against country singer Gretchen Wilson, claiming that she infringed upon their copyright for the song "Jealous Again". The suit also included claims against her label, her publisher, and TNT, who is using the song in promotional commercials. They claim that Wilson copied the Crowes hit when she recorded "Work Hard, Play Harder". The lawsuit was eventually settled out of court for an undisclosed sum and Black Crowes members Chris and Rich Robinson were given songwriting credits on "Work Hard, Play Harder."

== Track listings ==
7-inch and cassette single

A. "Jealous Again" (LP version) – 4:34
B. "Thick N' Thin" (LP version) – 2:43

12-inch and CD single

1. "Jealous Again"
2. "Waitin' Guilty"
3. "Thick N' Thin"

== Charts ==
=== Weekly charts ===
Chart (1990–1991)	Peak position
Australia (ARIA)	96
Canada Top Singles (RPM)	56
Netherlands (Dutch Top 40)	31
Netherlands (Single Top 100)	34
UK Singles (Official Charts)	76
US Billboard Hot 100	75
US Mainstream Rock Airplay (Billboard)	5
US Cash Box Top 100	73

=== Year-end charts ===
Chart (1990)	Position
US Album Rock Tracks (Billboard)	7

== Release history ==
Region	Date	Format(s)	Label(s)	Ref.
United States	January 30, 1990	cassette	Def American	
United Kingdom	June 4, 1990	7-inch vinyl; 12-inch vinyl; CD	Def American	
Australia	June 25, 1990	7-inch vinyl; 12-inch vinyl; CD; cassette	Def American	
