= She Talks to Angels =

1991 single by the Black Crowes

Single by the Black Crowes

from the album Shake Your Money Maker
- B-side: "Could I Have Been So Blind" (live)
- Released: March 1991
- Genre: Acoustic rock
- Length: 5:29
- Label: Def American
- Songwriters: Chris Robinson; Rich Robinson
- Producer: George Drakoulias

The Black Crowes singles chronology
"Twice As Hard" (1990)	"She Talks to Angels" (1991)	"Seeing Things" (1991)

Music video
- "She Talks to Angels" on YouTube

"She Talks to Angels" is a song by American rock band the Black Crowes. It is the eighth track on their first album, Shake Your Money Maker (1990), and was the fourth single released from the album in 1991. The song reached number 30 on the US Billboard Hot 100, number one on the Billboard Album Rock Tracks chart, and number 21 in New Zealand.

== Background ==
In 2010, Chris Robinson explained in a webisode (part of a promotional internet series for the band's 2010 Croweology album) that the song is loosely based on a "goth girl" he was acquainted with in Atlanta who was "into heroin".

== Track listings ==
US 7-inch and cassette single

A. "She Talks to Angels" (album version) – 5:30
B. "She Talks to Angels" (live video version) – 6:10

European maxi-CD single

1. "She Talks to Angels" – 5:30
2. "Could I Have Been So Blind" (live) – 3:42
3. "Jealous Again" (acoustic) – 4:43

European 7-inch single

A. "She Talks to Angels" – 5:30
B. "Could I Have Been So Blind" (live) – 3:42

Australian CD and cassette single

1. "She Talks to Angels" (edit)
2. "She Talks to Angels" (acoustic version)

== Charts ==
=== Weekly charts ===
Weekly chart performance for "She Talks to Angels"
Chart (1991)	Peak position
Australia (ARIA)	44
New Zealand (Recorded Music NZ)	21
UK Singles (Official Charts)	70
US Billboard Hot 100	30
US Mainstream Rock Airplay (Billboard)	1
US Cash Box Top 100	31
US AOR Tracks (Radio & Records)	1

=== Year-end charts ===
Year-end chart performance for "She Talks to Angels"
Chart (1991)	Position
US Album Rock Tracks (Billboard)	5

== Release history ==
Release dates and formats for "She Talks to Angels"
Region	Date	Format(s)	Label(s)	Ref.
United States	March 1991	—N/a	Def American	
United Kingdom	June 10, 1991	7-inch single; 12-inch single; CD	Def American	
Australia	July 15, 1991	CD; cassette	Def American	

== Cover versions ==
The song was covered by Brent Smith and Zach Myers of the American hard rock band Shinedown on their 2014 Acoustic Sessions EP. It was also covered by Mark Morton of the American heavy metal band Lamb of God on his 2020 solo EP Ether, featuring Lzzy Hale on vocals.

== See also ==
- List of Billboard Mainstream Rock number-one songs of the 1990s
