= Remedy (The Black Crowes song) =

1992 single by the Black Crowes

Single by the Black Crowes

from the album The Southern Harmony and Musical Companion
- B-side: "Darling of the Underground Press"
- Released: April 20, 1992
- Genre: Rock and roll; funk; soul
- Length: 5:22
- Label: Def American
- Songwriters: Chris Robinson; Rich Robinson
- Producers: George Drakoulias; The Black Crowes

The Black Crowes singles chronology
"Seeing Things" (1991)	"Remedy" (1992)	"Sting Me" (1992)

Music video
- "Remedy" on YouTube

"Remedy" is a song by American rock band the Black Crowes from their second album, The Southern Harmony and Musical Companion (1992). It appears as the second track on the album. "Remedy" reached number one on the US Billboard Album Rock Tracks chart in May 1992 and stayed there for 11 weeks. On the Billboard Hot 100, the song peaked at number 48. It also reached number 24 on the UK Singles Chart, becoming the band's highest-charting single in the United Kingdom, and entered the top 10 in New Zealand and Norway.

== Background ==
According to lead vocalist Chris Robinson, "Remedy" is a song about freedom, written as a response to the war on drugs, which Robinson considered "silly".

== Music video ==
The song's music video, directed by Pete Angelus, was added to MTV's playlist as an "exclusive" video on the week ending May 2, 1992. By early June, it was on heavy rotation.

== Track listings ==
All songs are written by Chris and Rich Robinson except where noted.

7-inch, cassette, and mini-CD single

1. "Remedy" – 5:22
2. "Darling of the Underground Press" – 5:33

UK 12-inch and CD single

1. "Remedy"
2. "Darling of the Underground Press"
3. "Time Will Tell" (Bob Marley)

== Charts ==
=== Weekly charts ===
Chart (1992–1993)	Peak position
Australia (ARIA)	21
Canada Top Singles (RPM)	29
Europe (Eurochart Hot 100)	57
Ireland (IRMA)	22
Netherlands (Dutch Top 40)	24
Netherlands (Single Top 100)	19
New Zealand (Recorded Music NZ)	6
Norway (VG-lista)	7
Switzerland (Schweizer Hitparade)	39
UK Singles (Official Charts)	24
US Billboard Hot 100	48
US Mainstream Rock Airplay (Billboard)	1
US Cash Box Top 100	35

=== Year-end charts ===
Chart (1992)	Position
US Album Rock Tracks (Billboard)	2

== Release history ==
Region	Date	Format(s)	Label(s)	Ref.
United Kingdom	April 20, 1992	7-inch vinyl; 12-inch vinyl; CD; cassette	Def American	
Australia	May 18, 1992	CD; cassette	Def American	
United States	June 1, 1992	7-inch vinyl	Def American	
Japan	June 5, 1992	Mini-CD	Def American	
