= Shake Your Money Maker (album) =

Studio album by the Black Crowes
- Released: February 13, 1990
- Recorded: 1989
- Studios: Soundscape (Atlanta); Chapel, Paramount and Grandmaster (Los Angeles)
- Genres: Blues rock; Southern rock; roots rock
- Length: 44:50
- Label: Def American
- Producer: George Drakoulias

The Black Crowes chronology
| Shake Your Money Maker (1990) | The Southern Harmony and Musical Companion (1992) |

Singles from Shake Your Money Maker
- 1. "Jealous Again" Released: January 1990; 2. "Hard to Handle" Released: August 1990; 3. "Twice As Hard" Released: December 1990; 4. "She Talks to Angels" Released: March 1991; 5. "Seeing Things" Released: October 1991

Shake Your Money Maker (also stylized as The Black Crowes Present: $hake Your Money Maker) is the debut studio album by American rock band the Black Crowes, released on February 13, 1990, on Def American Recordings. It is the only album by the band to feature guitarist Jeff Cease. The album is named after a classic blues song written by Elmore James. The Black Crowes have played the song live many times over the years, but it is not included on this album.

Shake Your Money Maker peaked at No. 4 on the Billboard 200, and two of its singles, "Hard to Handle" and "She Talks to Angels", reached No. 1 on the Mainstream Rock Tracks chart. "Jealous Again", "Twice As Hard" and "Seeing Things" were also charting singles in the United States. Shake Your Money Maker is the Black Crowes' best selling album, having sold more than 5 million copies.

On January 8, 2021, the Black Crowes announced that a 30th anniversary edition of the album would be released on February 26, 2021. The new version contains the original tracks remastered in addition to three previously unreleased songs, outtakes, two demos from the Mr. Crowe's Garden era, and a live performance set recorded in 1990 at Center Stage in Atlanta. Previously unreleased track "Charming Mess" was released on the same day as the announcement.

== Background and production ==
Brothers Chris and Rich Robinson had formed Mr. Crowe's Garden in 1984. In 1988 George Drakoulias saw the band at a show they did in New York City and had them signed to Def American the same year; they changed their name to the Black Crowes shortly after.

The recording sessions began in the summer of 1989 in Atlanta and Los Angeles, with Drakoulias producing the album. Some tracks include retained songs from the Mr. Crowe's Garden era such as "Could I've Been So Blind" and "She Talks to Angels", whose riff had been written years ago by then-17 year old Rich Robinson with lyrics written by Chris, which were inspired by a heroin-addicted girl he "kinda knew" in Atlanta. The band also chose to record a cover version of Otis Redding's "Hard to Handle", which would prove to be their breakthrough single.

Four music videos for "Twice As Hard", "Jealous Again", "Hard to Handle" and "She Talks to Angels" were filmed to promote the band and the album, and subsequently aired on MTV.

== Release and reception ==
Professional ratings
Review scores
| Source | Rating |
|---|---|
| AllMusic | 4/5 stars |
| Entertainment Weekly | B+ |
| Kerrang! | 5/5 |
| Melody Maker | 4/5 stars |
| Mojo | 4/5 stars |
| NME | 4/10 |
| Q | 4/5 stars |
| Record Collector | 4/5 stars |
| Rolling Stone | 3/5 stars |
| Uncut | 9/10 |

When the album came out in February 1990, critical reception was mostly favorable. Mark Coleman called Shake Your Money Maker "the kind of streamlined, supertight groove album that bar-band dreams are made of" in a review for Rolling Stone, whose readers and critics later voted the Black Crowes "Best New American Band" at the end of 1990; the band appeared on the cover of the magazine's 605th issue (May 1991) following their firing from the ZZ Top tour in March that year. The issue's interview of Chris and Rich Robinson compared the band to 1970s acts, with journalist David Fricke explicitly citing Faces and the Rolling Stones and Rich Robinson mentioning Aerosmith. In Entertainment Weekly, Dave Marsh wrote, "The Black Crowes are to the early Rolling Stones what Christian Slater is to the young Jack Nicholson: a self-conscious imitation, but fine enough in its own right. Authentic bluesmen these Crowes will never be, but their sheer energy earns 'em the right to trash it up." CMJ New Music Report noted that while the band "might have studied their sonic textbooks a little too closely, if the Crowes have more songs like these in store, they could be one of the biggest bands of the new decade." Retrospectively, AllMusic critic Steve Huey praised Rich Robinson's guitar playing and Chris Robinson's "appropriate vocal swagger".

== Track listing ==
All tracks are written by Chris and Rich Robinson, except where noted.

| No. | Title | Writer(s) | Length |
|---|---|---|---|
| 1. | "Twice As Hard" | | 4:09 |
| 2. | "Jealous Again" | | 4:35 |
| 3. | "Sister Luck" | | 5:13 |
| 4. | "Could I've Been So Blind" | | 3:44 |
| 5. | "Seeing Things" | | 5:18 |
| 6. | "Hard to Handle" | Allen Jones; Al Bell; Otis Redding | 3:08 |
| 7. | "Thick n' Thin" | | 2:44 |
| 8. | "She Talks to Angels" | | 5:29 |
| 9. | "Struttin' Blues" | | 4:09 |
| 10. | "Stare It Cold" | | 5:13 |
| 11. | "Live Too Fast Blues/Mercy, Sweet Moan" (hidden track) | Jones; Bell; Redding | 1:08 |

Bonus tracks (1998 reissues)
| No. | Title | Length |
|---|---|---|
| 11. | "Don't Wake Me" | 3:33 |
| 12. | "She Talks to Angels" (Acoustic) | 6:19 |

=== 30th Anniversary Edition ===
Disc 1: Original Album Remastered
| No. | Title | Writer(s) | Length |
|---|---|---|---|
| 1. | "Twice As Hard" | | 4:10 |
| 2. | "Jealous Again" | | 4:36 |
| 3. | "Sister Luck" | | 5:14 |
| 4. | "Could I've Been So Blind" | | 3:44 |
| 5. | "Seeing Things" | | 5:18 |
| 6. | "Hard to Handle" | Jones; Bell; Redding | 3:08 |
| 7. | "Thick n' Thin" | | 2:42 |
| 8. | "She Talks to Angels" | | 5:30 |
| 9. | "Struttin' Blues" | | 4:10 |
| 10. | "Stare It Cold" | | 5:15 |
| 11. | "Mercy, Sweet Moan" | Jones; Bell; Redding | 1:11 |

Disc 2: Outtakes and Demos
| No. | Title | Writer(s) | Length |
|---|---|---|---|
| 1. | "Charming Mess" | | 3:32 |
| 2. | "30 Days in the Hole" | Steve Marriott | 3:46 |
| 3. | "Don't Wake Me" | | 3:35 |
| 4. | "Jealous Guy" | John Lennon | 4:57 |
| 5. | "Waitin' Guilty" | | 3:04 |
| 6. | "Hard to Handle" (With Horns Remix) | Jones; Bell; Redding | 3:12 |
| 7. | "Jealous Again" (Acoustic Version) | | 4:50 |
| 8. | "She Talks to Angels" (Acoustic Version) | | 6:23 |
| 9. | "She Talks to Angels" (Mr. Crowe's Garden Demo) | | 5:11 |
| 10. | "Front Porch Sermon" (Mr. Crowe's Garden Demo) | | 3:57 |

Disc 3: Live at Center Stage, Atlanta (1990)
| No. | Title | Length |
|---|---|---|
| 1. | "Introduction" | 0:15 |
| 2. | "Thick n' Thin" | 2:42 |
| 3. | "You're Wrong" | 6:32 |
| 4. | "Twice As Hard" | 4:23 |
| 5. | "Could've Been So Blind" | 4:15 |
| 6. | "Seeing Things" | 5:51 |
| 7. | "She Talks to Angels" | 6:20 |
| 8. | "Sister Luck" | 5:36 |
| 9. | "Hard to Handle" | 3:30 |
| 10. | "Shake 'Em on Down" | 4:28 |
| 11. | "Get Back" | 4:55 |
| 12. | "Struttin' Blues" | 5:01 |
| 13. | "Words You Throw Away" | 13:44 |
| 14. | "Stare It Cold" | 5:19 |
| 15. | "Jealous Again" | 5:38 |

Notes

- "Live Too Fast Blues/Mercy, Sweet Moan" follows the bonus tracks on the 1998 reissue of the album.
- "Live Too Fast Blues/Mercy, Sweet Moan" does not appear on digital or streaming versions of the original album, thus cutting the track listing down to 10 songs.
- The bonus tracks were originally part of the recording sessions at Soundscape Studios in Atlanta.

== Personnel ==
The Black Crowes

- Chris Robinson – vocals
- Rich Robinson – guitar
- Jeff Cease – guitar
- Johnny Colt – bass guitar
- Steve Gorman – drums

Additional personnel

- Laura Creamer – background vocals
- Chuck Leavell – piano, organ
- Brendan O'Brien – Guitar solo on 'Hard to Handle' and "a potpourri of instruments"

Production

- George Drakoulias – producer
- Rick Rubin – executive producer (credited on the sleeve only after the album became successful)
- Pete Angelus – personal manager
- Dave Bianco – remixing on "Twice As Hard"
- Greg Fulginiti – original mastering
- Alan Forbes – artwork, art direction, design
- Tag George – assistant engineer
- Michael Lavine – photography
- Ruth Leitman – photography, cover photo
- Lee Manning – assistant engineer, mixing, mixing engineer
- Brendan O'Brien – engineer, mixing
- Leon Zervos – mastering

== Charts ==
=== Weekly charts ===
1991–1992 weekly chart performance for Shake Your Money Maker
| Chart (1991–1992) | Peak position |
|---|---|
| Australian Albums (ARIA) | 43 |
| Canada Top Albums/CDs (RPM) | 4 |
| Dutch Albums (Album Top 100) | 61 |
| New Zealand Albums (RMNZ) | 4 |
| Swedish Albums (Sverigetopplistan) | 48 |
| UK Albums (Official Charts) | 36 |
| US Billboard 200 | 4 |

2021 weekly chart performance for Shake Your Money Maker
| Chart (2021) | Peak position |
|---|---|
| Belgian Albums (Ultratop Flanders) | 75 |
| Belgian Albums (Ultratop Wallonia) | 85 |
| French Albums (SNEP) | 185 |
| German Albums (Offizielle Top 100) | 30 |
| Scottish Albums (Official Charts) | 11 |
| Spanish Albums (Promusicae) | 32 |
| Swiss Albums (Schweizer Hitparade) | 40 |

=== Year-end charts ===
1991 year-end chart performance for Shake Your Money Maker
| Chart (1991) | Position |
|---|---|
| New Zealand Albums (RMNZ) | 10 |
| US Billboard 200 | 3 |

1992 year-end chart performance for Shake Your Money Maker
| Chart (1992) | Position |
|---|---|
| US Billboard 200 | 87 |

== Certifications ==
Certifications for Shake Your Money Maker
| Region | Certification | Certified units/sales |
|---|---|---|
| Canada (Music Canada) | Gold | 50,000^{^} |
| New Zealand (RMNZ) | Platinum | 15,000^{^} |
| United Kingdom (BPI) | Silver | 60,000^{^} |
| United States (RIAA) | 5× Platinum | 5,000,000^{^} |
^{^} Shipments figures based on certification alone.
