= Eddie Harsch =

Canadian keyboardist (1957–2016)

- Born: May 27, 1957; Toronto, Ontario, Canada
- Died: November 4, 2016 (aged 59); Toronto, Ontario, Canada
- Genres: Rock; blues
- Instruments: Keyboards; bass guitar

Eddie Harsch (born Edward Hawrysch; May 27, 1957 – November 4, 2016) was a Canadian keyboardist and member of Detroit-based jam band Bulldog. Previous to that he was The Black Crowes' keyboardist from 1991 to 2006. Harsch was replaced on keyboards by Rob Clores and then Adam MacDougall. Harsch first joined Bulldog during The Black Crowes' hiatus, which lasted from early 2002 to early 2005. During that time, he also played bass in the Detroit Cobras. In the 1980s, Harsch was a member of James Cotton's band.

In 2016, Harsch was to become a co-founding member of The Magpie Salute, a band which also features his former Black Crowes bandmates Rich Robinson, Marc Ford and Sven Pipien.

Harsch died in Toronto on November 4, 2016, at the age of 59. No cause of death was reported.
