= Steve Gorman =

American drummer

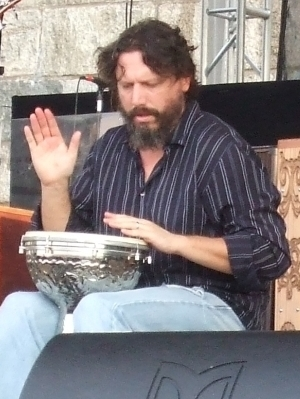
- Gorman performing with The Black Crowes at the 2008 Newport Folk Festival

Background information
- Born: August 17, 1965 (age 61); Muskegon, Michigan, U.S.
- Genres: Rock, blues
- Occupation: Musician
- Instruments: Drums, percussion
- Website: stevegormanrocks.com blackcrowes.com

Steve Gorman (born August 17, 1965) is an American musician and radio host. He is best known as the former drummer of the American rock and roll band The Black Crowes. He spent time as the drummer for British rock band Stereophonics. He also hosted his own radio show Steve Gorman Sports! on Fox Sports Radio. He is now the host of Steve Gorman Rocks! on Westwood One radio station affiliates and the morning-show co-host at KQRS-FM in Minneapolis. He also co-hosts on 101.5 WQUT in Tennessee. In 2019, he released a memoir about his time with The Black Crowes, Hard to Handle.

== Career ==
=== Early career ===
While a fourth grader at Benfield Elementary School in Severna Park, Maryland, Gorman joined the school band and played the snare drum. After moving to Hopkinsville, Kentucky in 1975, Gorman went to high school (University Heights Academy) with Clint Steele, an aspiring guitarist. Gorman was a broadcasting major at Western Kentucky University. He played drums with several Bowling Green bands including Alfred and the Stately Wayne Manors, Swale, Baby Fae and the Heartless Baboons, Coupe deVille and the Autos, A Tribute to Elvis, and the Ricky Nelson Story. Finally, in 1986, Gorman, along with friends Brent Woods and Jon Vanover, formed Lack of Interest and recorded a four-song demo tape titled Content to Sit and Stare in April 1986 at the University Heights Academy gymnasium.

=== The Black Crowes ===
In February 1987, he joined his high school friend Clint Steele in Atlanta, Georgia to drum for Steele's band, Mary My Hope. While in Atlanta he became good friends with Chris Robinson and his brother Rich. When the Robinson brothers lost their drummer Jeff Sullivan to the band Drivin n Cryin, Gorman was asked to sit in and play on "Mr. Crowes Garden's" demo session for A&M records. He ended up playing with the renamed Black Crowes for their first nine albums over 15 years. In late 2001, he decided to leave the band to pursue other avenues and relocated to Los Angeles. In 2005, he rejoined the reformed Black Crowes. When the band reformed in 2019, Gorman was not asked to join.

On September 24, 2019, Gorman released Hard to Handle: The Life and Death of the Black Crowes – A Memoir, which he co-wrote with author Steven Hyden. The 364 page book is published by Da Capo Press and promises an insider's look at the history of the group, which was together for more than two decades.

On January 9, 2023, Gorman joined classic rock KQRS-FM in Minneapolis as co-host of the morning show with Brian Zepp, Tony Lee and Candice Wheeler. The show has been rebranded as Gorman In The Morning with Paul Fletcher and Ryder.

=== Other work ===
Gorman spent 2004 on the road with the Stereophonics. His played on Warren Zevon's final studio recording The Wind, Bob Dylan's Greatest Hits Volume 3, Jack Casady's Dream Factor, Joe Firstman's The War of Women, John Corbett's self-titled debut album, Bo Bice's See the Light and 3, and the first album by Brothers of the Southland. Gorman is currently a member of Trigger Hippy along with Nashville friend Nick Govrik.

Gorman has contributed drum tracks to the solo album from Lamb of God guitarist Mark Morton, scheduled for release on March 1, 2019.

The Minnesota-based roots rock supergroup Golden Smog added Gorman as a member in November 2024.

In 2025, Gorman, Darius Rucker, and R.E.M. bassist Mike Mills formed a supergroup called Howl Owl Howl, releasing the single "My Cologne."

=== Steve Gorman Sports! and Steve Gorman Rocks! ===
A lifelong sports fan, in March 2010, Gorman—with friends Mitch Blum and Brandon Gnetz—created the sports, music and pop culture podcast and website Steve Gorman Sports!. On the show Gorman tells tales of life on the road and riffs on current sports, music and pop culture events. Gorman's show was broadcast on a Nashville radio station with producer Austin Huff but he left the station in the summer of 2013.

On January 2, 2014, it was announced that Gorman would join Fox Sports Radio as the host of a daily three-hour show with his cousin and co-host, Jeffrey Gorman, from 3pm to 6pm Eastern, broadcast immediately following Doug Gottlieb's show. Gorman's stint with Fox Sports Radio began on January 27, 2014.

On September 11, 2018, the Fox Sports Network announced that Gorman's show would be removed from the network's lineup.

On September 9, 2019, Steve Gorman Rocks! began airing on select Westwood One radio affiliates.
