= The Lost Crowes =

Compilation album by The Black Crowes
- Released: September 26, 2006
- Recorded: 1993, 1994, 1997
- Genre: Southern rock, hard rock, blues rock
- Length: 112:33
- Label: American
- Producer: The Black Crowes

The Black Crowes chronology
Lions (2001)	The Lost Crowes (2006)	Warpaint (2008)

The Black Crowes compilation chronology
Greatest Hits 1990–1999: A Tribute to a Work in Progress... (1999)	The Lost Crowes (2006)	Croweology (2010)

Professional ratings
Review scores
Source	Rating
Allmusic	4/5 stars

The Lost Crowes is a compilation album by American rock band The Black Crowes. The two-disc compilation comprises material composed and recorded during the Tall and Band sessions in 1993 and 1997, respectively. Many of the songs on Tall were early versions of songs that later appeared the 1994 album Amorica, with one appearing on the 1996 album Three Snakes and One Charm.

The album Band was recorded in 1997 but never released. In its place the band recorded and released By Your Side in 1998.

Originally, The Lost Crowes was slated to be released in late August 2006, but was pushed back to September 26 due to a manufacturing error in which the disc art for the two albums was reversed.

== Track listing ==
All tracks are written by Chris Robinson and Rich Robinson.

Disc one: The Tall Sessions
No.	Title	Length
1.	"A Conspiracy" (The song was later re-recorded for and released on Amorica.)	4:39
2.	"Evil Eye" (The song was later re-recorded for and released on Three Snakes and One Charm.)	4:26
3.	"Cursed Diamond" (The song was later re-recorded for and released on Amorica.)	5:45
4.	"London P.25" (The song was later re-recorded for and released as "P. 25 London" on Amorica.)	3:33
5.	"Dirty Hair Halo"	4:51
6.	"Hi-Head Blues" (The song was later re-recorded for and released as "High-Head Blues" on Amorica.)	4:20
7.	"Feathers"	6:41
8.	"Nonfiction" (The song was later re-recorded for and released on Amorica.)	4:13
9.	"Tied Up and Swallowed" (The song was later re-recorded for and released as a bonus track on early editions on Amorica.)	4:19
10.	"Wiser Time" (The song was later re-recorded for and released on Amorica.)	6:17
11.	"Sunday Buttermilk Waltz" (Formerly released as "Sunday Night Buttermilk Waltz" as a bonus track on the remastered version of Amorica, this is a new mix.)	2:30
12.	"Descending" (The song was later re-recorded for and released on Amorica.)	5:25
13.	"Lowdown" (The song was later re-recorded for and released on Amorica as "Ballad in Urgency," with some lyrical changes.)	4:51
14.	"Tornado" (The song was later re-recorded for and released on Phosphorescent Harvest by the Chris Robinson Brotherhood, with some lyrical and arrangements changes.)	2:41
15.	"Song of the Flesh" (Formerly released as a bonus track on the remastered version of Amorica, this is a new mix.)	3:44
16.	"Thunderstorm 6:54"	4:03

Disc two: The Band Sessions
No.	Title	Length
1.	"Paint an 8" (Portions of this song were worked into "Come On" from Lions.)	3:05
2.	"Another Roadside Tragedy"	5:31
3.	"If It Ever Stops Raining" (The song was later re-recorded, with different lyrics, and released as "By Your Side" on the album of the same name.)	4:45
4.	"Wyoming & Me"	4:15
5.	"Predictable"	3:14
6.	"Never Forget This Song"	3:43
7.	"Lifevest"	3:19
8.	"Grinnin'"	3:16
9.	"My Heart's Killing Me" (This song also found on Brothers of a Feather: Live at the Roxy, 2007 (featuring Chris and Rich Robinson).)	5:06
10.	"Peace Anyway" (This song was re-recorded and released as a B-side for By Your Side.)	4:01

== Personnel ==
The Black Crowes

- Chris Robinson – vocals
- Rich Robinson – guitar
- Marc Ford – guitar
- Johnny Colt – bass
- Steve Gorman – drums
- Eddie Harsch – keyboards

Production

- Ian Cooper – mastering
- The Black Crowes – producer
- Shaun Grove – engineer (1997 sessions)
- Kevin Harp – digital transfer engineer
- Chris Harrison – mixer
- David Leonard – engineer (1997 sessions)
- Howell Luther – assistant engineer (1997 sessions)
- Vincent Marshel – assistant engineer (1997 sessions)
- Jim Mitchell – engineer (1994 sessions)
- Sean Odwyer – assistant engineer (1994 sessions)
- Jamie Selway – mixer
- Paul Stacey – mixer (disc one only)

== Charts ==
Chart (2006)	Peak position
US Billboard 200	128
