= Wiser for the Time =

Live album by the Black Crowes
- Released: March 18, 2013
- Genre: Blues rock, hard rock, southern rock
- Length: 155:59
- Label: Relativity, Silver Arrow

The Black Crowes chronology
Croweology (2010)	Wiser for the Time (2013)	1972 (2022)

Professional ratings
Review scores
Source	Rating
AllMusic	3/5 stars

Wiser for the Time is the fifth live album by American southern rock band the Black Crowes, released on March 18, 2013. This marks their return from hiatus and is the first Black Crowes live album since Warpaint Live in 2009. Recorded during a five-night run in New York City (NYC) in their supporting tour for the 2010 album Croweology and released as vinyl or download. It includes live recordings (15 acoustic & 11 electric) from the band's 2010 NYC performances and four covers: "Hot Burrito #1" and "Hot Burrito #2" from The Flying Burrito Brothers, Little Feat's "Willin'" and Bob Dylan's "Tonight I'll Be Staying Here with You".

== Track listing ==
=== Disc one ===
1. "Cursed Diamond" – 7:21
2. "Sister Luck" – 6:21
3. "Smile" – 4:40
4. "Downtown Money Waster" – 4:47
5. "Hot Burrito #1" (The Flying Burrito Brothers cover) – 4:06
6. "Hot Burrito #2" (The Flying Burrito Brothers cover) – 4:36
7. "Garden Gate" – 4:35
8. "Better When You're Not Alone" – 6:46
9. "Darling of the Underground Press" – 4:27
10. "Jealous Again" – 5:44
11. "Hotel Illness" – 4:22
12. "Thunderstorm" – 4:37
13. "Oh the Rain" – 6:21

=== Disc two ===
1. "Soul Singing" – 4:53
2. "Tonight I'll Be Staying Here with You" (Bob Dylan cover) – 3:34
3. "Exit" – 6:17
4. "No Speak No Slave" – 5:02
5. "(Only) Halfway to Everywhere" – 10:44
6. "A Conspiracy" – 5:08
7. "Title Song" – 8:35
8. "My Morning Song/Stare It Cold" – 11:19
9. "Tied Up & Swallowed" – 5:58
10. "Make Glad" – 5:08
11. "Waiting Guilty" – 8:52
12. "She Talks to Angels" – 6:15
13. "Willin'" (Little Feat cover) – 5:31

== Personnel ==
- Lead vocals, guitar: Chris Robinson
- Guitar, vocals: Rich Robinson
- Guitar: Luther Dickinson
- Bass: Sven Pipien
- Drums: Steve Gorman
- Keyboards: Adam MacDougall
- Percussion: Joe Magistro
- Backing vocals: Charity White & Laura Williams
