= The Magic Door (album) =

Studio album by Chris Robinson Brotherhood
- Released: September 11, 2012
- Genre: Blues rock
- Length: 50:55
- Label: Silver Arrow Records
- Producer: Thom Monahan

Chris Robinson Brotherhood chronology
| Big Moon Ritual (2012) | The Magic Door (2012) | Phosphorescent Harvest (2014) |

Professional ratings
Review scores
| Source | Rating |
|---|---|
| Allmusic | 3.5/5 stars |
| Marquee Magazine | 4/5 stars |

The Magic Door is the second studio album by American blues rock band Chris Robinson Brotherhood, released on September 11, 2012. It was recorded at the same time as the band's previous album, Big Moon Ritual, and features a cover of Hank Ballard's "Let's Go, Let's Go, Let's Go," a song the band frequently performed live. "Appaloosa" and "Little Lizzie Mae" are versions of recent Black Crowes songs (from Before the Frost...Until the Freeze and Cabin Fever, respectively), and "Someday Past the Sunset" was previously released on the Robinson brothers' live album, Brothers of a Feather: Live at the Roxy.

== Track listing ==
All songs by Chris Robinson, except where noted.

| No. | Title | Writer(s) | Length |
|---|---|---|---|
| 1. | "Let's Go, Let's Go, Let's Go" | Hank Ballard | 4:55 |
| 2. | "Someday Past the Sunset" | | 6:20 |
| 3. | "Appaloosa" | Robinson, Rich Robinson | 5:17 |
| 4. | "Vibration & Light Suite" | | 13:56 |
| 5. | "Little Lizzie Mae" | | 6:19 |
| 6. | "Sorrows of a Blue-Eyed Liar" | Robinson, Neal Casal, Adam MacDougall | 8:38 |
| 7. | "Wheel Don't Roll" | Robinson, Casal | 5:30 |
| Total length: | | | 50:55 |

== Personnel ==
Chris Robinson Brotherhood

- Chris Robinson – lead vocals, guitar
- Neal Casal – guitar, vocals
- Adam MacDougall – keyboards, vocals
- Mark Dutton – bass, vocals
- George Sluppick – drums

Others

- Amy Finkle – featured artist
- Thom Monahan – engineer, mixing, production
- Nicolas Essig – assistant engineer
- Geoff Neal – assistant engineer
- Alan Forbes – artwork
