= Happiness Bastards =

Studio album by the Black Crowes
- Released: March 15, 2024
- Genre: Rock
- Length: 37:54
- Label: Silver Arrow
- Producer: Jay Joyce

The Black Crowes chronology
1972 (2022)	Happiness Bastards (2024)	A Pound of Feathers (2026)

Happiness Bastards is the ninth studio album by American rock band the Black Crowes, released on March 15, 2024, through Silver Arrow Records. The album was produced by Jay Joyce. It is the band's first album since their 2019 reformation, the first album of new material since 2009's Before the Frost...Until the Freeze, and the first without longtime drummer Steve Gorman. The album was preceded by the single "Wanting and Waiting", released on January 12, 2024.

The album received a nomination for Best Rock Album at the 67th Annual Grammy Awards.

== Critical reception ==
Professional ratings
Aggregate scores
Source	Rating
Metacritic	80/100
Review scores
Source	Rating
Blues Rock Review	8/10
Classic Rock	4.5/5 stars
AllMusic	4/5 stars
Record Collector	4/5 stars
Paste	7.3/10
Under The Radar Mag	7/10
Pop Matters	7/10

Happiness Bastards received a score of 80 out of 100 on review aggregator Metacritic based on nine critics' reviews, indicating "generally favorable". In Classic Rock Pat Carty described it as "A rock'n'roll record that's funkier than a tramp's kacks, more soulful than a gospel convention, warmer than a mother's love and groovier than the Grand Canyon."

=== Year-end lists ===
Select year-end rankings for Happiness Bastards
Publication/critic	Accolade	Rank	Ref.
Loudwire	The 11 Best Rock Albums of 2024	8	
MOJO	The Best Albums Of 2024	43	

== Track listing ==
All tracks are written by Chris Robinson and Rich Robinson.

No.	Title	Length
1.	"Bedside Manners"	3:41
2.	"Rats and Clowns"	3:33
3.	"Cross Your Fingers"	3:49
4.	"Wanting and Waiting"	4:15
5.	"Wilted Rose" (featuring Lainey Wilson)	5:06
6.	"Dirty Cold Sun"	3:05
7.	"Bleed it Dry"	2:56
8.	"Flesh Wound"	3:34
9.	"Follow the Moon"	3:26
10.	"Kindred Friend"	4:29
Total length:		37:54

== Personnel ==
The Black Crowes

- Chris Robinson – lead vocals, harp, artwork, design
- Rich Robinson – guitar, vocals
- Nico Bereciartúa – guitar
- Erik Deutsch – keyboards
- Sven Pipien – bass, vocals
- Brian Griffin – drums

Additional contributors

- Jay Joyce – production, mixing, guitar, keyboards
- Pete Lyman – mastering
- Jason Hall – mixing, engineering
- Daniel Bacigalupi – mastering assistance
- Alex Grimm – engineering assistance
- Jimmy Mansfield – engineering assistance
- Josh Groppel – engineering assistance
- Camille Robinson – artwork, design

== Charts ==
Chart performance for Happiness Bastards
Chart (2024)	Peak position
Australian Albums (ARIA)	107
Austrian Albums (Ö3 Austria)	44
Belgian Albums (Ultratop Flanders)	44
Belgian Albums (Ultratop Wallonia)	53
Dutch Albums (Album Top 100)	29
German Albums (Offizielle Top 100)	18
Japanese Hot Albums (Billboard Japan)	31
Scottish Albums (OCC)	5
Spanish Albums (PROMUSICAE)	47
Swiss Albums (Schweizer Hitparade)	11
UK Albums (OCC)	31
UK Independent Albums (OCC)	2
US Billboard 200	97
US Independent Albums (Billboard)	18
US Top Rock Albums (Billboard)	15
