= Croweology =

Studio album by The Black Crowes
- Released: August 3, 2010
- Recorded: 2009–2010
- Genres: Southern rock; blues rock; hard rock; acoustic rock; folk rock; jazz rock
- Length: 121:24
- Label: Silver Arrow
- Producer: Paul Stacey

The Black Crowes chronology
Before the Frost...Until the Freeze (2009)	Croweology (2010)	Wiser for the Time (2013)

Professional ratings
Aggregate scores
Source	Rating
Metacritic	(69/100)
Review scores
Source	Rating
Allmusic	3.5/5 stars
The Austin Chronicle	2/5 stars
BBC Music	(favorable)
The Daily Telegraph	5/5 stars
Entertainment Weekly	B
Kerrang!	3/5 stars
Paste	(7.3/10)
PopMatters	7/10 stars
Rolling Stone	4/5 stars
Uncut	4/5 stars

Croweology is an acoustic-based album by American rock band The Black Crowes, released on August 3, 2010. The set includes newly recorded versions of nineteen songs from the band's career, covering their albums from Shake Your Money Maker to Lions, plus a cover of the Chris Ethridge and Gram Parsons song "She", in mostly-acoustic arrangements. Critic Stephen Thomas Erlewine stated the Crowes capture "the sound of seasoned veterans still finding new ways to play old favorites" and the double album is "a generous, entertaining gift to the fans who have stayed true throughout the years". This would be the last recorded album to feature lead guitarist, Luther Dickinson. Croweology was the last studio record released by the band before their hiatus lasting from 2013 to 2020.

== Track listing ==
Disc one

1. "Jealous Again" – 5:13
2. "Share the Ride" – 3:58
3. "Remedy" – 5:33
4. "Non-Fiction" – 7:54
5. "Hotel Illness" – 3:38
6. "Soul Singing" – 4:15
7. "Ballad in Urgency" – 9:16
8. "Wiser Time" – 9:33
9. "Cold Boy Smile" – 5:35
10. "Under a Mountain" – 4:42

Disc two

1. "She Talks to Angels" – 6:16
2. "Morning Song" – 6:13
3. "Downtown Money Waster" – 4:17
4. "Good Friday" – 5:42
5. "Thorn in My Pride" – 9:35
6. "Welcome to the Good Times" – 4:01
7. "Girl from a Pawnshop" – 7:08
8. "Sister Luck" – 5:58
9. "She" – 5:31
10. "Bad Luck Blue Eyes Goodbye" – 7:03

Bonus tracks (iTunes only)

1. "Boomer's Story"
2. "Willin'"

== Personnel ==
The Black Crowes

- Chris Robinson – vocals, harp, guitars
- Richard Robinson – guitars, vocals
- Steve Gorman – drums
- Sven Pipien – bass, vocals
- Luther Dickinson – guitars, mandolin, banjo
- Adam MacDougall – keyboards, vocals

Additional personnel

- Charity White and Mona Lisa Young – backing vocals
- Joe Magistro – percussion
- Donny Herron – pedal steel, lap steel, banjo, fiddle

== Charts ==
Chart (2010)	Peak position
Dutch Albums (Album Top 100)	80
German Albums (Offizielle Top 100)	98
Scottish Albums (Official Charts)	56
UK Albums (Official Charts)	62
US Billboard 200	13
