= New Earth Mud =

Studio album by Chris Robinson
- Released: October 22, 2002
- Genre: Classic rock
- Length: 59:45
- Label: Redline
- Producer: Paul Stacey and Chris Robinson

Chris Robinson chronology
New Earth Mud (2002)	This Magnificent Distance (2004)

Professional ratings
Aggregate scores
Source	Rating
Metacritic	55/100
Review scores
Source	Rating
AllMusic	3/5 stars
Blender	3/5 stars
Entertainment Weekly	C−
Drowned in Sound	3/10
Mojo	4/5 stars
Q	3/5 stars
Rolling Stone	2/5 stars
Uncut	4/10

New Earth Mud is the solo debut studio album of Chris Robinson. It was released October 22, 2002 on Redline Records. Initial pressings came with a bonus DVD, which included a documentary on the making of the album and several acoustic live performances. The album was Robinson's first solo effort after a dozen years recording and touring with the band he formed with his brother Rich Robinson during the 1980s, the Black Crowes, which had gone on hiatus after the completion of its 2001 tour in support of the album, Lions. The songs "Sunday Sound" and "Ride" have gone on to become staples of Robinson's live shows.

== Track listing ==
All songs written by Chris Robinson, except where noted.

1. "Safe in the Arms of Love" – 4:14
2. "Silver Car" (Robinson, Eddie Harsch, Paul Stacey) – 4:47
3. "Kids That Ain't Got None" (Robinson, Harsch, Stacey) – 5:56
4. "Could You Really Love Me?" (Robinson, Stacey) – 4:06
5. "Untangle My Mind" – 5:34
6. "Fables" – 3:21
7. "Sunday Sound" (Robinson, Marc Ford) – 5:01
8. "Barefoot by the Cherry Tree" (Robinson, Stacey) – 5:55
9. "Katie Dear" – 5:50
10. "Ride" – 5:13
11. "Better Than the Sun" (Robinson, Dean DeLeo) – 5:16
12. "She's on Her Way" – 4:32

== Personnel ==
Musicians

- Gordie Johnson – standup bass
- Matt Jones – clavinet, Fender Rhodes, harpsichord, piano, Wurlitzer
- Chris Robinson – acoustic guitar, electric guitar, percussion, vocals
- Jeremy Stacey – drums
- Paul Stacey – bass, acoustic guitar, baritone guitar, electric guitar, mini moog, organ, piano

Production

- Darren Ankenman – photography
- Ian Cooper – mastering
- Regan Hagar – design, layout design
- Steve Payne – assistant engineer
- Chris Robinson – art direction, producer
- George Seara – assistant engineer
- Paul Stacey – mixing, producer
