= George Sluppick =

American drummer (born 1968)

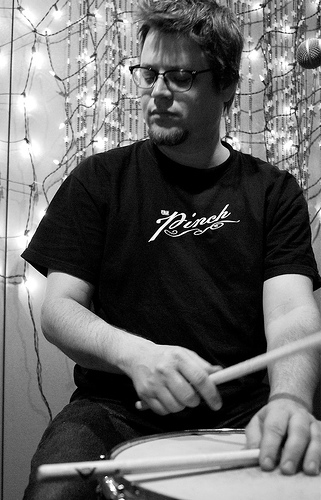

Background information
- Birth name: George Peter Sluppick
- Also known as: George Sluppick
- Born: January 14, 1968 (age 57)
- Genres: Blues, soul, R&B, rock
- Occupation: Drummer
- Years active: 1986–present

George Peter Sluppick (born January 14, 1968, in Memphis, Tennessee) is an American touring and session drummer, best known for his association with bands such as The City Champs, Robert Walter's 20th Congress, Sha Na Na, JJ Grey & Mofro and the Chris Robinson Brotherhood.

== Biography ==
Under his father's tutelage and his mother's large record collection, George learned very quickly how to play with a band and at 7 years old, made his first public performance at the Goodlett Elementary School carnival in Memphis. During high school, George played in rock bands and cut his teeth playing blues on Beale Street and sitting in with luminaries like B. B. King. He graduated in 1986 from Overton High School in Memphis, where he sang second tenor in the concert choir and played drums for their award winning gospel choir. After graduation, George put together a blues trio with his father, "Big George" and guitarist, Joe Hardin called, Triple Threat but the name was short lived and changed to TBC (Tennessee Blues Connection). In early 1987, he auditioned for Albert King's band and joined the blues artist for one month, opening shows for B. B. King, Waylon Jennings and Carl Perkins. From 1988 until 1991, he toured the southeast college circuit with two rock-n-roll bands, Big Fish & the Crime.

In July 1991, George moved to San Diego, California and while there played with Billy Bacon & The Forbidden Pigs, Robin Henkel, Eric Lieberman, Billy Watson, the cat Mary, Sha Na Na & Robert Walter's 20th Congress, touring all over North America and Japan. Spending three years drumming with the cat Mary, George recorded on several of the group's albums, the most critically acclaimed one was Her High, Lonesome Days (Orchard Music Group). With Sha Na Na he recorded on two of their albums, Live in Japan (Sony Japan) and Rockin’ Christmas (The Gold Label). During this time, he also recorded with Robert Walter’s 20th Congress on Giving Up the Ghost (Magnatude Records), Gary Jules’ multi-platinum album Trading Snake Oil for Wolftickets (Universal Music Group), and on a tune with singer Judith Owen for the soundtrack to the film, As Good as It Gets (Sony).

George moved to New York City in May 2003 and for three months played with the late soul jazz guitarist Melvin Sparks.

In September 2003, George joined Jacksonville, Florida.-based JJ Grey & Mofro, a relationship that lasted five years. During his time with Mofro, George recorded on three of the band’s albums and toured North America, Europe & Australia.

In early March 2005, he moved to New Orleans, Louisiana but when Hurricane Katrina hit the city in September of that year, he moved to Austin, Texas. He stayed in Austin for 10 months and during that time met soul singer Ruthie Foster and recorded drums on her album, The Phenomenal Ruthie Foster (Blue Corn), produced by Malcolm "Papa Mali" Welbourne, which debuted at No. 2 on the Billboard Blues chart.

George came back to Memphis in July 2006 and soon joined up with organist Al Gamble, guitarist Joe Restivo and saxophonist Art Edmaiston to form the boogaloo instrumental band The Grip. The Grip recorded an EP for Archer Records titled Grab This Thing. Edmaiston joined JJ Grey & Mofro and both he and George toured together in the band for one year, until George left the group in March 2008. When Mofro's touring schedule picked up and Edmaiston left to go on the road, the three remaining members of The Grip changed the band’s name to The City Champs and played regular gigs in Memphis, including The Buccaneer Lounge. The Tuesday night sessions caught the ear of Memphis producer Scott Bomar who decided to record the band and ultimately released their first album on his Electraphonic Records label. In 2008, working alongside Bomar, George and Al Gamble played on the score for the film, Gospel Hill, which stars Angela Bassett, Giancarlo Esposito, Danny Glover, Julia Stiles and Samuel L. Jackson.

The City Champs' first album, The Safecracker, received rave reviews from critics worldwide. In February 2010, The City Champs were asked to join The North Mississippi Allstars on a U.S. tour, during which they opened the shows, as well as sat-in with the band during their sets. Also in 2010, The City Champs took part in the filming of a music documentary titled Take Me To The River, March 2014. This Cody Dickinson and Martin Shore-produced film showcases Memphis music legends recording with younger Memphis artists. The City Champs teamed up with Memphis harmonica legend Charlie Musselwhite and renowned Muscle Shoals Rhythm Section bassist, David Hood to film a segment for this project.

In November 2010, The City Champs once again teamed with Scott Bomar and released their second album The Set-Up (Electraphonic). The Set-Up includes instrumental original music by the band, plus a cover of RJD2’s A Beautiful Mine (the theme to AMC TV’s Mad Men). Some tracks on The Set-Up also include horn players Marc Franklin, Jim Spake, Kirk Smothers and Memphis percussionist, Felix Hernandez. Motown legend Jack Ashford of The Funk Brothers, contributed tambourine to the recording, as well. The Champs' music has been featured in the MTV series $5 Cover and in the Emmy Award-winning documentary film I Am a Man: From Memphis, A Lesson in Life.

In December 2010, George received a phone call from Black Crowes front man, Chris Robinson, who asked him to come to Los Angeles and play drums with his new group, Chris Robinson Brotherhood. Robinson had been given a copy of The Set-Up from Sluppick's longtime friend and Crowes' guitarist, Luther Dickinson.

In February 2011, George produced and played drums on soul singer Billy Seward's debut record, Better Place, released in August 2011.

George toured with the Brotherhood from March 2011 to January 2015 and recorded three studio albums with them, Big Moon Ritual, The Magic Door & Phosphorescent Harvest and two live albums, Betty's Blends, Volume's 1 & 2 (Silver Arrow Records).

He lives in Memphis.

== Selected discography ==
- The Cat Mary, Her High, Lonesome Days (Orchard Music Group)
- Kait Lawson, Until We Drown (Madjack Records)
- Jesse Aycock, Flowers And Wounds (Horton Records)
- Soundtrack, As Good As It Gets (Sony)
- Robert Walter’s 20th Congress, Giving Up The Ghost (Magnatude Records)
- Mofro, Blackwater (Alligator Records)
- Mofro, Lochloosa (Alligator Records)
- JJ Grey & Mofro, Country Ghetto (Alligator Records)
- Gary Jules, Trading Snake Oil For Wolftickets (Universal Records)
- Ruthie Foster, The Phenomenal Ruthie Foster (Blue Corn)
- The City Champs, The Safecracker (Electraphonic Recordings)
- The City Champs, The Set-Up (Electraphonic Recordings)
- Chris Robinson Brotherhood, Big Moon Ritual (Silver Arrow Records)
- Chris Robinson Brotherhood, The Magic Door (Silver Arrow Records)
- Chris Robinson Brotherhood, Phosphorescent Harvest (Silver Arrow Records)
