= A Pound of Feathers =

2026 studio album by the Black Crowes

Studio album by the Black Crowes
- Released: March 13, 2026
- Studios: Neon Cross (Nashville, Tennessee)
- Length: 41:59
- Label: Silver Arrow
- Producer: Jay Joyce

The Black Crowes chronology
Happiness Bastards (2024)	A Pound of Feathers (2026)

Singles from A Pound of Feathers
- 1. "Profane Prophecy" / "Pharmacy Chronicles" Released: January 9, 2026; 2. "It's Like That" Released: January 28, 2026

A Pound of Feathers is the tenth studio album by American rock band the Black Crowes, released on March 13, 2026, via the band's own Silver Arrow label.

== Background ==
A Pound of Feathers is the band's tenth studio album following their ninth album Happiness Bastards. When asked about the album's creation, Chris Robinson explained during a Zoom meeting with Billboard magazine:

I'm always looking at the angle of, 'Look, we've made a lot of records. We've been doing this a long time. What can we do with this one?' It comes down to loving what you're doing, and there's joy in creation that we always get involved with and tap into...It forces you to be instinctual instead of thinking about it.

== Singles and release ==
Two singles preceded the album: "Profane Prophecy" / "Pharmacy Chronicles" on January 9, 2026, and "It's Like That" on January 28. A Pound of Feathers was released on March 13, 2026, on Silver Arrow Records, a record label owned by the Black Crowes themselves.

== Critical reception ==
Professional ratings
Aggregate scores
Source	Rating
AnyDecentMusic?	7.6/10
Metacritic	87/100
Review scores
Source	Rating
AllMusic	4/5 stars
The Arts Desk	3/5 stars
Classic Pop	4/5 stars
Classic Rock	4/5 stars
The Guardian	4/5 stars
Hot Press	9/10
Mojo	4/5 stars
Paste	B−
PopMatters	8/10
Uncut	8/10

According to the review aggregator Metacritic, A Pound of Feathers received "universal acclaim" based on a weighted average score of 87 out of 100 from 8 critic scores. The review aggregator AnyDecentMusic? gave the album a weighted average score of 7.6 out of 10 from seven critic scores.

Writing for Classic Rock magazine, Pat Carty said that it "is not quite as immediate, ... as Happiness Bastards, but repeated listens pay off", comparing the relationship between the two to that of The Southern Harmony and Musical Companion and Amorica. In a PopMatters review, Michael Elliott stated that it "plays like a greatest hits of the Robinsons, just dressed up in new clothes", concluding by stating "It's a talent that may not prove hall-of-fame worthy, but it's close enough for rock and roll." In a review for The Guardian, Steve Chick wrote that after the critical success of Happiness Bastards, their new record saw them "returning to a winning formula" without becoming "formulaic or phoned-in" for a band of their age. Tim Sendra concludes an AllMusic review by saying it "comes damn close" to the quality of The Southern Harmony and Musical Companion and Amorica, "and that's enough to make it something quite special".

== Track listing ==
All lyrics are written by Chris Robinson; all music is composed by Chris and Rich Robinson.

Side 1: A Pound of Feathers
No.	Title	Length
1.	"Profane Prophecy"	4:07
2.	"Cruel Streak"	4:09
3.	"Pharmacy Chronicles"	4:32
4.	"Do the Parasite!"	3:46
5.	"High and Lonesome"	3:41
6.	"Queen of the B-Sides"	2:02

Side 2: A Pound of Lead
No.	Title	Length
7.	"It's Like That"	3:20
8.	"Blood Red Regrets"	4:07
9.	"You Call This a Good Time?"	3:40
10.	"Eros Blues"	3:53
11.	"Doomsday Doggerel"	4:42
Total length:		41:59

== Personnel ==
Credits are adapted from the vinyl liner notes.

=== The Black Crowes ===
- Chris Robinson – vocals
- Rich Robinson – guitars, bass, backing vocals
- Cully Symington – drums
- Erik Deutsch – keyboards
- Mackenzie Adams, Leslie Grant – backing vocals

=== Technical and design ===
- Jay Joyce – production; mixing at Neon Cross
- Jason Hall – recording, mixing at Neon Cross
- Bobby Louden – engineering assistance
- Pete Lyman – mastering at Infrasonic
- Camille and Chris Robinson – art direction
- Michelle Holme – art design
- Lindsey Ross – photography

== Charts ==
Chart performance for A Pound of Feathers
Chart (2026)	Peak position
Australian Albums (ARIA)	34
Austrian Albums (Ö3 Austria)	19
Belgian Albums (Ultratop Flanders)	72
Belgian Albums (Ultratop Wallonia)	37
Dutch Albums (Album Top 100)	70
French Albums (SNEP)	182
French Rock & Metal Albums (SNEP)	7
German Albums (Offizielle Top 100)	21
German Rock & Metal Albums (Offizielle Top 100)	9
Japanese Albums (Oricon)	42
Japanese Digital Albums (Oricon)	29
Japanese Rock Albums (Oricon)	7
Japanese Top Albums Sales (Billboard Japan)	41
Norwegian Physical Albums (IFPI Norge)	1
Scottish Albums (Official Charts)	4
Swedish Physical Albums (Sverigetopplistan)	5
Swiss Albums (Schweizer Hitparade)	11
UK Albums (Official Charts)	37
UK Americana Albums (Official Charts)	1
UK Independent Albums (Official Charts)	3
US Independent Albums (Billboard)	37
US Top Album Sales (Billboard)	12
