= Phosphorescent Harvest =

Studio album by Chris Robinson Brotherhood
- Released: April 29, 2014
- Recorded: Sunset Sound, Los Angeles, CA
- Genre: Blues rock
- Length: 65:14
- Label: Silver Arrow Records
- Producer: Thom Monahan

Chris Robinson Brotherhood chronology
The Magic Door (2012)	Phosphorescent Harvest (2014)

Professional ratings
Review scores
Source	Rating
AllMusic	2.5/5 stars
American Songwriter	2.5/5 stars

Phosphorescent Harvest is the third studio album by the Chris Robinson Brotherhood. It was released in the United States on April 29, 2014.

== Track listing ==
All songs written by Chris Robinson and Neal Casal, except where noted.

No.	Title	Writer(s)	Length
1.	"Shore Power"		4:41
2.	"About a Stranger"		5:07
3.	"Meanwhile in the Gods...."		6:08
4.	"Badlands Here We Come"		5:24
5.	"Clear Blue Sky & the Good Doctor"		7:47
6.	"Beggar's Moon"		6:55
7.	"Wanderer's Lament"		5:37
8.	"Tornado"	Robinson	5:04
9.	"Jump the Turnstiles"	Robinson	6:40
10.	"Burn Slow"		7:13
11.	"Humboldt Windchimes" (bonus track on CD only)		4:38
Total length:			65:14

- On the LP release, there is an additional 7" with "Humboldt Windchimes"/"Star Crossed Lonely Sailor."

== Personnel ==
Chris Robinson Brotherhood

- Chris Robinson – lead vocals, guitar
- Neal Casal – guitar, vocals
- Adam MacDougall – keyboards, vocals
- Mark Dutton – bass, vocals
- George Sluppick – drums

Others

- Thom Monahan – production, engineering, mixing
- Geoff Neal – assistant engineer
- Nicolas Essig – additional assistant engineer
- JJ Golden – mastering
- Amy Finkle – featured artist
- Larry Carlson – cover art ("Hudson River Sunset Deluxe")
- Alan Forbes – inside panel and owl artwork
- Neal Casal – 7" back cover photo, inner sleeve photos and photo textures
- Craig Santiago – "Sower" line art
