= Chris Robinson Brotherhood =

American blues rock band

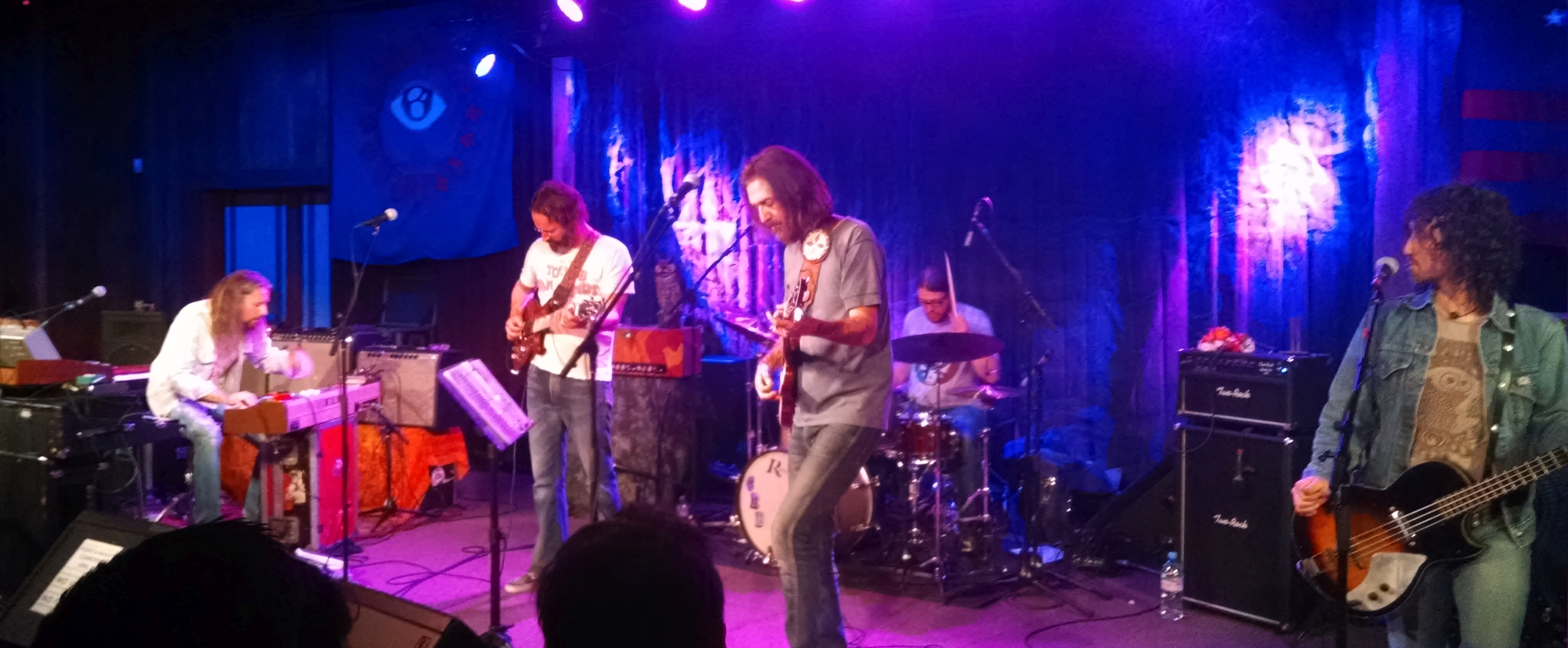
- Chris Robinson fronting the Brotherhood at Terrapin Crossroads in San Rafael, CA, April 2014

Background information
- Also known as: CRB
- Origin: Los Angeles, California, U.S.
- Genres: Blues rock; psychedelic rock; Southern rock; jam rock
- Years active: 2011–2019
- Label: Silver Arrow
- Past members: Chris Robinson; Neal Casal; George Sluppick; Mark Dutton; Adam MacDougall; Tony Leone; Jeff Hill; Joel Robinow
- Website: chrisrobinsonbrotherhood.com

Chris Robinson Brotherhood was an American blues rock band formed in 2011 by Black Crowes singer Chris Robinson while the Crowes were on hiatus. The original lineup consisted of Robinson (vocals, guitar), Neal Casal (lead guitar, backing vocals), Mark Dutton (bass guitar, backing vocals), George Sluppick (drums), and Adam MacDougall (keyboards). Since 2015, the band had undergone various personnel changes with Robinson, Adam MacDougall and Casal remaining the only constant members. The Chris Robinson Brotherhood announced it would disband, followed shortly by the death of Neal Casal in August 2019,

== History ==
=== Formation and Big Moon Ritual ===
Chris Robinson Brotherhood began as an experiment but became a 'band' during their California residency tour. The original intention, according to Robinson, was to "have a local L.A. band, just play in California, see where the music takes us and have a good time." They then embarked on a 118-date North American tour in 2011. Robinson names Grateful Dead members Phil Lesh and Bob Weir, who sat in with the band during CRB's run at the Great American Music Hall, as both musical inspirations and friends. As well as Robinson, the band features fellow Black Crowes member Adam MacDougall, Ryan Adams collaborator Neal Casal, bassist Mark Dutton, and drummer George Sluppick. Robinson describes the Brotherhood as a "farm-to-table psychedelic band".

Chris Robinson Brotherhood released a version of "Blue Suede Shoes" (written by Carl Perkins) b/w a live version "Girl, I Love You" (written by Al Bell and Eddie Floyd) for Record Store Day on April 21, 2012. The CD version also features a cover of the Jimmy Reed song, "Bright Lights Big City".

The band's debut album, Big Moon Ritual, was recorded at Sunset Sound Studios, Los Angeles, and was released on June 5, 2012. Robinson said Big Moon Ritual is "not a concept album, but it's very conceptual sonically." He also notes that CRB "isn't the type of band that's going to make a concise four-minute song record" and that they prefer instead to make lengthier compositions.

=== The Magic Door ===
Just three months after its predecessor, on September 11, 2012, Chris Robinson Brotherhood's second studio album, The Magic Door, was released. It was recorded at the same time as Big Moon Ritual and features a cover of the Hank Ballard song "Let's Go, Let's Go, Let's Go," which the band has often played live.

=== "Betty's S.F. Blends, Volume One" ===
In September 2013, Chris Robinson Brotherhood released an album featuring songs picked by Grateful Dead record producer Betty Cantor-Jackson, recorded over five nights in San Francisco. The band played 96 songs altogether and Cantor-Jackson picked the best ones for the album. The album has only been released on vinyl. The album was called "Betty's S.F. Blends, Volume One". The five full shows are also available as separate downloads.

=== Phosphorescent Harvest ===
Chris Robinson Brotherhood released its third studio album "Phosphorescent Harvest" on Silver Arrow Records on April 29, 2014. The songs on the album are mostly co-written by Chris Robinson and Neal Casal. Produced by Thom Monahan. FORMATS: 12" Vinyl / CD / Digital Download.

=== Any Way You Love, We Know How You Feel and EP ===
Chris Robinson Brotherhood released its fourth studio album Any Way You Love, We Know How You Feel on July 29, 2016, and on November 4, 2016, an EP titled If You Lived Here, You Would Be Home By Now, containing five songs from the same sessions.

=== Barefoot In The Head ===
The CRB released their fifth studio album Barefoot In The Head in 2017.

=== Servants of the Sun ===
Chris Robinson Brotherhood released their sixth studio album, Servants of the Sun, on June 14, 2019. Robinson noted that he wrote the songs on the album with the idea that they would be played live. "With our last couple of albums we made songs we knew we probably weren't going to play live," he said. "This time around every one of these songs will fall into the live repertoire."

== Personnel ==
- Chris Robinson – lead vocals, guitars (2011–2019)
- Neal Casal – guitars, vocals (2011–2019; his death)
- Adam MacDougall – keyboards (2011–2019)
- Mark "Muddy" Dutton – bass guitar, vocals (2011–2016)
- George Sluppick – drums (2011–2015)
- Tony Leone – drums (2015–2019)
- Jeff Hill – bass guitar (2016–2019)
- Joel Robinow – keyboards (2019)
- Pete Sears – keyboards (2019)

== Discography ==
=== Studio albums ===
Year	Album details	Peak chart position
Year	Album details	US
2012	Big Moon Ritual: Release date: June 5, 2012; Label: Silver Arrow Records	63
2012	The Magic Door: Release date: September 11, 2012; Label: Silver Arrow Records	98
2014	Phosphorescent Harvest: Release date: April 29, 2014; Label: Silver Arrow Records	61
2016	Any Way You Love, We Know How You Feel: Release date: July 29, 2016; Label: Silver Arrow Records	118
2016	If You Lived Here, You Would Be Home by Now: Release date: November 4, 2016; Label: Silver Arrow Records	—
2017	Barefoot in the Head: Release date: July 21, 2017; Label: Silver Arrow Records	—
2019	Servants of the Sun: Release date: June 14, 2019; Label: Silver Arrow Records	—

=== Live albums ===
Year	Album details
2013	Betty's Blends Volume 1: Release date: November 24, 2013; Label: Silver Arrow Records; Format: 12", red/white marble
2015	Betty's Blends Volume 2: Release date: June 2, 2015; Label: Silver Arrow Records; Format: 12"
2017	Betty's Blends, Vol. 3: Self-Rising, Southern Blends: Release date: May 5, 2017; Label: Silver Arrow Records; Format: LP, CD, digital download, online streaming
2018	Betty's Midwestern Magic Blends: Release date: November 16, 2018; Label: Silver Arrow Records; Format: LP, digital download

=== Singles ===
Year	Single details
2012	"Blue Suede Shoes"/"Girl I Love You": Release date: April 21, 2012; Label: Silver Arrow Records; Formats: 7", CD
2013	"Older Guys"/"That's How Strong My Love Is": Release date: 2013; Label: Silver Arrow Records; Formats:7", MP3/FLAC
