= This Magnificent Distance =

Studio album by Chris Robinson & the New Earth Mud
- Released: June 29, 2004
- Genre: Southern rock, blues-rock, roots rock
- Length: 66:15
- Label: Vector
- Producer: Chris Robinson and Paul Stacey

Chris Robinson & the New Earth Mud chronology
New Earth Mud (2002)	This Magnificent Distance (2004)	Live at Bonnaroo (2004)

Professional ratings
Review scores
Source	Rating
Allmusic	3.5/5 stars

This Magnificent Distance is Chris Robinson's second solo album, released on June 29, 2004. The album draws on a vast panorama of Americana music—rock, blues, folk, country, soul and elements of jazz.

== Reception ==
The album generated some praise from a variety of outlets. It earned a four-star review in the June/July issue of Blender, in which Clark Collis cited “the singer’s heartfelt howling and dynamite harmonica playing.” Harp magazine's Jaan Uhelszki praised Robinson's “rebel-hearted romanticism, tales of ruined innocence, and the quest for personal liberation” (August 2004), while Tracks’ Holly George-Warren noted how “Prominent keyboards and eloquent guitar work (by former Black Crowes guitarist Audley Freed, Robinson and co-producer Paul Stacey) make the bucolic ‘Girl On The Mountain,’ the majestic ‘When the Cold Wind Blows…’ and the nostalgic ‘(Last of the Old Time) Train Robbers’ sound like Fillmore East jam sessions...A grittier mood envelops the harmonica-driven ‘Piece of Wind,’ in which Robinson's political convictions surface.”

== Track listing ==
All songs written by Chris Robinson, except where noted.

1. "40 Days" – 4:37
2. "Girl on the Mountain" (Robinson, Paul Stacey) – 7:05
3. "Mother of Stone" (Robinson, Audley Freed) – 3:45
4. "(Last of the Old Time) Train Robbers" – 6:42
5. "Like a Tumbleweed in Eden" – 5:08
6. "When the Cold Wind Blows at the Dark End of Night" (Robinson, Stacey) – 7:59
7. "...If You See California" – 4:44
8. "The Never Empty Table" (Robinson, Stacey) – 5:06
9. "Eagles on the Highway" (Robinson, Stacey) – 4:38
10. "Surgical Glove" – 6:01
11. "Piece of Wind" (Robinson, Stacey) – 5:08
12. "Sea of Love" (Robinson, Stacey) – 5:22
13. "Like a Tumbleweed in Eden (Original Version)" (Japanese Bonus Track) – 5:08
14. "Prayer For The Gravity Man" (Japanese Bonus Track) – 2:30

Several early pressings incorrectly list "Sea of Love" as track 11 and "Piece of Wind" as track 12, but they are in the correct running order when played.

== Personnel ==
Chris Robinson: vocals, guitar, harmonica
Paul Stacey: guitar
Jeremy Stacey: drums, percussion
George Laks: keyboards
Audley Freed: guitars (tracks 1, 3 & 5)
Ethan Johns: drums (tracks 3 & 5)
Richard Causon: keyboards (tracks 3 & 5)
George Reiff : bass guitar

== Credits ==
Paul Stacey: co-producer, engineer, mixing
Chris Robinson: co-producer
Ian Cooper: Mastering
