= Adam MacDougall (musician) =

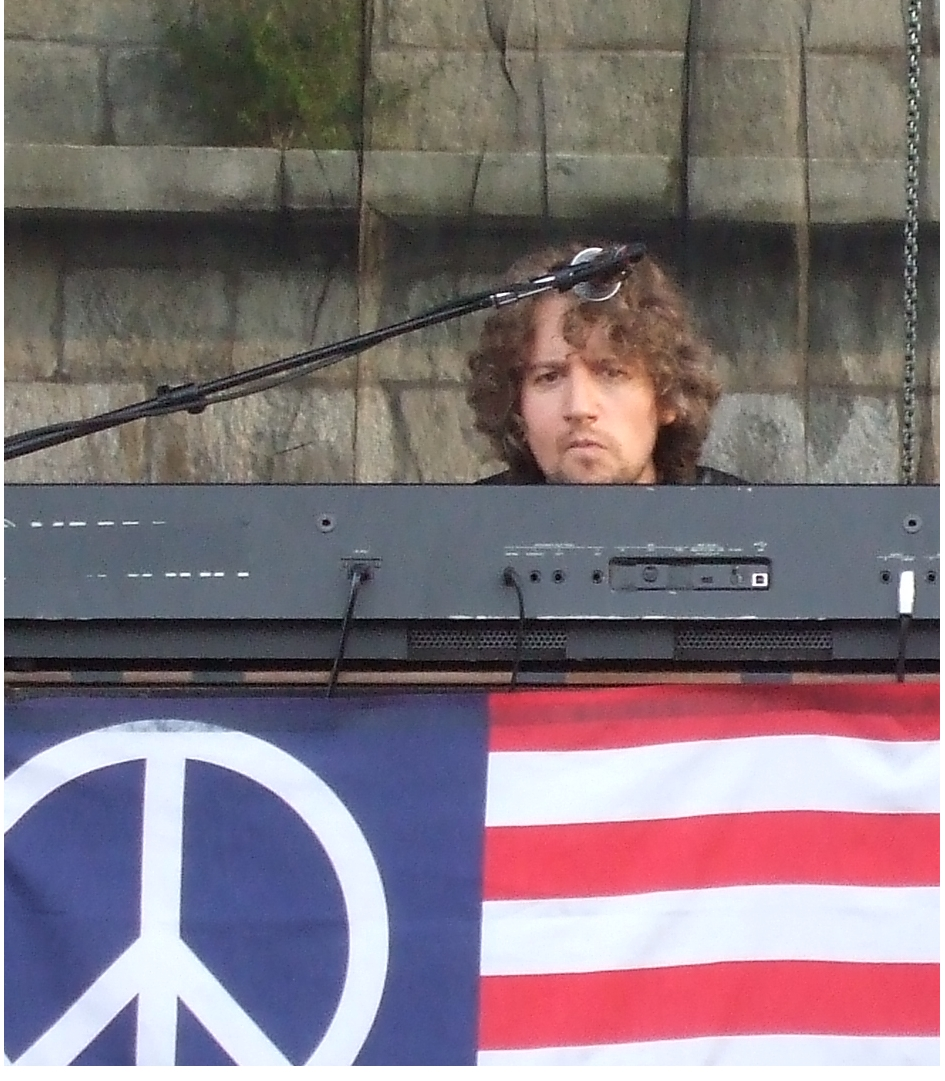
- Adam MacDougall performing with The Black Crowes at the 2008 Newport Folk Festival.

Background information
- Born: August 1974 (age 51); New York City, New York, U.S.
- Genres: Rock; Blues
- Instrument(s): Keyboards, drums
- Formerly of: The Black Crowes; The Ben Taylor Band; Macy Gray; Patti Rothberg; Chris Robinson Brotherhood; Furslide; Phil Lesh and Friends

Adam MacDougall (born August 1974 in New York City, New York), is a keyboardist and founding member of the band Circles Around the Sun. Previously, he played with The Black Crowes, replacing Rob Clores for the album Warpaint in July 2007. He was a member of The Ben Taylor Band and Furslide, and he has also toured with Macy Gray, Patti Rothberg and Dawes.

== Discography ==
=== with The Black Crowes ===
- Warpaint, March 3, 2008
- Warpaint Live, April 28, 2009
- Before the Frost...Until the Freeze, September 1, 2009
- Croweology, August 3, 2010
- Wiser for the Time, March 19, 2013

=== with Chris Robinson Brotherhood ===
- Big Moon Ritual, June 5, 2012
- The Magic Door, September 11, 2012
- Phosphorescent Harvest, April 29, 2014
- Any Way You Love, We Know How You Feel, July 29, 2016
- Barefoot in the Head, July 21, 2017
- Servants of the Sun, June 14, 2019

=== Various ===
- Macy Gray, The Trouble with Being Myself, July 15, 2003
- Jason Darling, Night Like My Head, October 7, 2003
- Chacon, Matches & Gasoline, 2003
- Our Lady Peace, Healthy in Paranoid Times, August 30, 2005
- Natasha Bedingfield, N.B., April 30, 2007
- Maroon 5, It Won't Be Soon Before Long, May 22, 2007
- Lili Haydn, Place Between Places, April 1, 2008
- Lenka, Lenka, September 23, 2008
- Julian Casablancas, Phrazes for the Young, October 20, 2009
- Jarrod Gorbel, Devil's Made a New Friend, August 31, 2010
- The Elected, Bury Me in My Rings, May 17, 2011
- Mia Doi Todd, Cosmic Ocean Ship, May 17, 2011
- Jonathan Wilson, Gentle Spirit, August 8, 2011
- Phil Lesh and Friends, Various Performances, 2012
- Circles Around The Sun, Fare Thee Well Setbreak music, 2015
