= Warpaint (The Black Crowes album) =

Studio album by The Black Crowes
- Released: March 3, 2008
- Recorded: July 2007
- Studios: Allaire, Shokan, New York
- Genres: Southern rock, blues rock, hard rock
- Length: 53:44
- Label: Megaforce/Silver Arrow Records
- Producer: Paul Stacey

The Black Crowes chronology
Lions (2001)	Warpaint (2008)	Before the Frost...Until the Freeze (2009)

Singles from Warpaint
- 1. "Goodbye Daughters of the Revolution" Released: February 11, 2008; 2. "Wounded Bird" Released: June 2, 2008; 3. "Oh Josephine" Released: September 8, 2008

Professional ratings
Aggregate scores
Source	Rating
Metacritic	(74/100)
Review scores
Source	Rating
Allmusic	4.5/5 stars
The A.V. Club	B
The Austin Chronicle	3/5 stars
The Gazette	2.5/4 stars
The Globe and Mail	3/4 stars
Paste	4/5 stars
Robert Christgau	(dud)
Rolling Stone	3.5/5 stars
Toronto Sun	3.5/5 stars
Uncut	3/5 stars

Warpaint is the seventh studio album by American rock band The Black Crowes. Released on March 3, 2008, it was the band's seventh studio album and first studio album in almost seven years, and its first with new members Luther Dickinson and Adam MacDougall, as well as the first to be released on the band's own Silver Arrow Records label. Despite its predecessor, Lions, selling more copies, Warpaint debuted 15 spots higher in the United States, at number five.

== Writing and production ==
Following the departures of Marc Ford and Eddie Harsch in September 2006, The Black Crowes enlisted Paul Stacey and Rob Clores to handle lead guitar and keyboard duties, respectively. Adam MacDougall replaced Clores just before the Warpaint sessions began, and Paul Stacey returned to the producer’s chair with the hiring of Luther Dickinson of North Mississippi Allstars to play guitar. (Aside from a couple of appearances in September, Dickinson didn’t join the band on the road until the release of Warpaint, leaving Stacey to play the remainder of their 2007 concerts.)

Though the band had debuted new songs sporadically live since reforming in 2005, none were included on Warpaint, with only the intro of "Movin’ On Down the Line" having been performed for a live audience (as part of a jam in the middle of "Soul Singing"). It was a conscious decision to leave the road-tested songs behind; as Chris Robinson told Rolling Stone, "I wanted to show people where we are now." Rich Robinson wrote the music and would send CDs to Chris, who would add the lyrics and their melodies.

In July 2007, the band gathered at Allaire Studios in the Catskill Mountains of Upstate New York to record, finding that the remote setting contributed to the relative ease of recording.

"When we got into the studio, it just flowed so easily. We were on top of this mountain, and we were all living in the same place. There were no city distractions or people coming by. We were up there to work. A lot of that made it onto the record. Nature—and harmony."

— Rich Robinson

According to Chris, so as not to lose "the dynamic of the group, the dynamic of music and the balance within that," the tracks were recorded live, with few overdubs. Only one take was necessary to capture "Evergreen," while "Whoa, Mule" was recorded outdoors. The atmosphere and the band’s approach allowed the sessions to be completed in just three weeks.

Various band members have spoken about the contributions of Dickinson and MacDougall. "Sometimes when new people come in it brings so many positive changes," said Rich. "Adam came in and tried out and everyone was impressed, but when we got into the studio everyone's jaws dropped."

Sven Pipien remarked, "The beauty of Luther, more than any note he's playing is the feeling behind that note. He was saying exactly what we want to say, and the same thing goes for Adam. Eddie [Harsch] is not the easiest guy to replace but Adam is his own man AND he fills those shoes really well."

== Maxim review controversy ==
A review of Warpaint published by Maxim in its March 2008 issue prompted The Black Crowes' management to issue a press release denouncing the publication, as no promotional copies of the album had been distributed, meaning only the single edit of "Goodbye Daughters of the Revolution" could have been heard before the review was written. The story was picked up by the Associated Press, and preceded an exchange in which Maxim apologized to its readers and The Black Crowes' management slammed the magazine's editors for not apologizing to the band. Black Crowes' manager Pete Angelus then followed up with an open letter to Maxim and its editorial director, James Kaminsky.

The writer of the review, David Peisner, claimed in an interview with the Los Angeles Times that he had been assigned to write a preview of the album, and that his writing had been presented by Maxim as if it were a full review. With the magazine facing increased criticism over rating unheard albums, including one by rapper Nas, Kaminsky promised that future previews will be labeled as such.

== Track listing ==
All songs written by Chris Robinson and Rich Robinson, except where noted.

1. "Goodbye Daughters of the Revolution" – 5:03
2. "Walk Believer Walk" – 4:39
3. "Oh Josephine" – 6:38
4. "Evergreen" – 4:20
5. "Wee Who See the Deep" – 4:50
6. "Locust Street" – 4:14
7. "Movin' On Down the Line" – 5:42
8. "Wounded Bird" – 4:23
9. "God's Got It" (Rev. Charlie Jackson) – 3:22
10. "There's Gold in Them Hills" – 4:47
11. "Whoa Mule" – 5:45

=== Bonus tracks ===
- "Here Comes Daylight" – 3:46
- "Hole in Your Soul" (Joe South) – 3:39

The picture disc vinyl version of the album includes a bonus 7" disc with "Here Comes Daylight" and "Hole in Your Soul". These tracks are bundled with the iTunes version of the album, as well, though "Hole in Your Soul" was only available if pre-ordered.

According to Crowesbase.com, the band's official archives website, four other songs were recorded, and they were titled, "Movin' On" (different from "Movin' On Down the Line"), "Ready For Rain," "Natural Born Turn It On" and "Share My Blanket."

== Personnel ==
=== The Black Crowes ===
- Chris Robinson – vocals, harmonica, percussion
- Rich Robinson – guitars
- Luther Dickinson – guitar, mandolin on "Locust Street"
- Steve Gorman – drums
- Adam MacDougall – keyboards
- Sven Pipien – bass guitar

=== Additional musicians ===
- Paul Stacey – twelve string guitar on "Whoa Mule"

=== Technical personnel ===
- Paul Stacey – producer, engineer, mixing
- Justin Kessler – Pro Tools operator, second engineer (studio)
- Matt Howe, Justin Lawson – Pro Tools operator, second engineer (mix)
- Pete Angelus – manager (Angelus Entertainment)
- Amy Finkle – manager (Angelus Entertainment, East Coast)
- Joshua Marc Levy – illustrations
- Matthew Mendenhall – photography
- Chris Robinson – collage

== Charts ==
Chart (2008)	Peak position
Australian Albums (ARIA)	70
Belgian Albums (Ultratop Flanders)	78
Belgian Albums (Ultratop Wallonia)	71
Dutch Albums (Album Top 100)	24
French Albums (SNEP)	96
German Albums (Offizielle Top 100)	74
Scottish Albums (Official Charts)	40
Swedish Albums (Sverigetopplistan)	50
UK Albums (Official Charts)	52
US Billboard 200	5
