= Soul Singing =

2001 single by The Black Crowes

- UK CD1 cover

Single by The Black Crowes

from the album Lions
- B-side: "Love Is Now"; "Last Time Again"; "Sleepyheads"; "Soul Singing" (Live)
- Released: July 23, 2001
- Recorded: January–February 2001 at Montana Rehearsal Studios, New York City and Theater 99 Recording, New York City
- Genre: Blues rock, folk rock, alternative rock, soul
- Length: 3:54
- Label: V2
- Songwriters: Rich & Chris Robinson
- Producer: Don Was

The Black Crowes singles chronology
"Lickin'" (2001)	"Soul Singing" (2001)

"Soul Singing" is a song by the American rock band The Black Crowes, released on July 23, 2001, as the second single from the group's sixth studio album Lions.

== Writing and production ==
The "Soul Singing" music video, directed by Liz Friedlander, features highly saturated shots of the band performing in a vast, grassy field with widely scattered extras. Audley Freed and Andy Hess appear despite not playing on the track.

"Soul Singing" was co-written, like all original Black Crowes songs, by Chris and Rich Robinson. The song began with a riff that Rich had written a "long time" before the recording of Lions. Chris then added the vocal melodies and corresponding lyrics, which pertained to his then-wife, Kate Hudson. While Chris believed this early form of "Soul Singing", with one instrumental section throughout, sufficed, Rich argued a second section was needed. "So we talked about that one for a while", recalled Rich, who ultimately won the argument.

Rich recorded his guitar part with a James Trussart metal-bodied electric, which offered a resonator-like tone. "I knew that guitar was the only one that could go from sounding acoustic in the verses to electric in the chorus in the way that I wanted", said Rich.

== Track listing ==
All songs written by Rich & Chris Robinson.

UK CD1

1. "Soul Singing" – 3:54
2. "Love Is Now" – 4:23
3. "Last Time Again" – 5:30

UK CD2

1. "Soul Singing" – 3:54
2. "Sleepyheads" – 4:15
3. "Soul Singing" (Live) – 4:05

== Charts ==
Chart (2001)	Peak position
Australia (ARIA)	191
U.S. Billboard Hot Mainstream Rock Tracks	12

UK: #80
