= Big Moon Ritual =

Studio album by Chris Robinson Brotherhood
- Released: June 5, 2012
- Recorded: Sunset Sound, Los Angeles, CA
- Genre: Blues rock
- Length: 60:28
- Label: Silver Arrow Records
- Producer: Thom Monahan

Chris Robinson Brotherhood chronology
Big Moon Ritual (2012)	The Magic Door (2012)

Professional ratings
Aggregate scores
Source	Rating
Metacritic	75/100
Review scores
Source	Rating
Allmusic	4/5 stars
Blues Rock Review	8/10
Classic Rock	8/10 stars
Consequence of Sound	2.5/5 stars
The Independent	4/5 stars
Mojo	60/100
NME	8/10
The Observer	3/5 stars
Uncut	8/10

Big Moon Ritual is the debut studio album by American blues rock band Chris Robinson Brotherhood. It was released on June 5, 2012, and was recorded during the same sessions as the band's second album, The Magic Door, which would be released three months later.

== Track listing ==
All songs by Chris Robinson, except where noted.

No.	Title	Writer(s)	Length
1.	"Tulsa Yesterday"	Robinson, Neal Casal	11:54
2.	"Rosalee"		9:05
3.	"Star or Stone"		9:32
4.	"Tomorrow Blues"		7:07
5.	"Reflections on a Broken Mirror"		7:37
6.	"Beware, Oh Take Care"	Robinson, Casal	7:46
7.	"One Hundred Days of Rain"	Robinson, Casal	7:27

"Rosalee", "Star or Stone", "Tomorrow Blues" and "Reflections on a Broken Mirror" published by Psychedelic Hippopotamus (BMI). "Tulsa Yesterday", "Beware, Oh Take Care" and "One Hundred Days of Rain" published by Psychedelic Hippopotamus (BMI)/Grand Island Music (ASCAP).

== Personnel ==
Chris Robinson Brotherhood

- Chris Robinson – lead vocals, guitar
- Neal Casal – guitar, vocals
- Adam MacDougall – keyboards, vocals
- Mark Dutton – bass, vocals
- George Sluppick – drums

Others

- Thom Monahan – engineer, mixing, production
- Nicolas Essig – assistant
- Geoff Neal – assistant
- Bruno Borges – artwork
- Alan Forbes – artwork (CRB lettering/label art)
