= Sven Pipien =

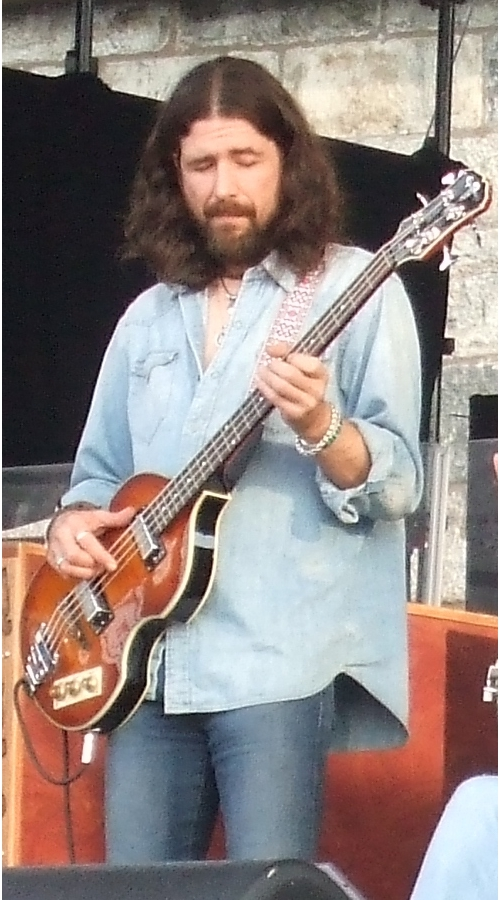
- Pipien on stage with The Black Crowes at the 2008 Newport Folk Festival

Background information
- Born: 30 May 1967 (age 59); Hanover, Germany
- Occupation: Musician
- Instrument: Bass
- Labels: Silvertone, Mary My Hope

Sven Pipien (born 30 May 1967, in Hanover, Germany) is a musician best known as the bassist of the southern rock band The Black Crowes.

== Biography ==
Sven Pipien began his musical career playing bass with Atlanta-based rock outfit Mary, My Hope. The band recorded one full-length LP in 1989 (Museum) and one EP in 1990 (Suicide Kings) and garnered enough college radio popularity to earn them opening slots on headlining tours for Love and Rockets and Jane's Addiction. Their style, which included elements which would later be heard with the emergence of grunge in the early-to-mid 1990s, was out of place with much of the mainstream music scene at the time and the band split up in 1991. A compilation, Monster Is Bigger Than The Man, appeared shortly after, featuring four previously released songs and four unissued cuts.

Pipien reappeared in 1997, when he replaced original bassist Johnny Colt in multi-platinum rock act The Black Crowes. He would spend the next year performing live with the band and making contributions to their fifth studio album, By Your Side, which was finally released in January 1999 after several delays. A live EP, Souled Out...Live!, would appear later in the same year, culled from the band's support tour for By Your Side.

In the Fall of 1999, The Black Crowes were tapped by Jimmy Page to be his band for a tour featuring a setlist predominantly made up of Led Zeppelin material. The short tour would prove very successful for both parties and resulted in the live release, Live at the Greek, which appeared in mid-2000. The album was an early entry into the catalog of releases exclusive to the Internet and demand for it was so high, the server of its provider, MusicMaker.com, crashed for an entire day.

More dates were added to the tour with Page, keeping the band booked through the majority of 2000. Pipien was let go from the band mid-tour, however, replaced by well-known session player Greg Rzab.

Pipien would reappear the next year with King Bee, a Miami-based blues rock outfit, a band he would remain with until 2002. He would make no contributions to any of the band's studio output, their first album not recorded until 2003. After departing King Bee, Pipien virtually disappeared from the music scene.

When The Black Crowes ended their three-year hiatus in March 2005, they invited Pipien to rejoin the band as bassist. He accepted the invitation and remained a member of the band through their 2015 breakup, recording two studio and two live albums during his second stay.

In late 2016, following the Black Crowes' 2015 breakup, he became a founding member of the Magpie Salute, a band which features his former Black Crowes bandmates Rich Robinson and Marc Ford. He rejoined the Black Crowes when that band reformed in 2021.

== Discography ==
With Mary My Hope:

- Museum (1989)
- Suicide Kings (EP) (1990)
- Monster Is Bigger Than The Man (Compilation) (1991)

With The Black Crowes:

- By Your Side (1999)
- Souled Out...Live! (1999)
- Live at the Greek (2000)
- Freak 'n' Roll...Into the Fog (2005)
- Warpaint (2008)
- Warpaint Live (2009)
- Before the Frost...Until the Freeze (2009)
- Croweology (2010)
- Wiser for the Time (2013)
- Happiness Bastards (2024)

With The Magpie Salute:

- The Magpie Salute (2017)
- High Water I (2018)
- High Water II (2019)
