= Three Snakes and One Charm =

Studio album by the Black Crowes
- Released: July 23, 1996
- Recorded: 1995
- Genre: Blues rock, hard rock
- Length: 48:38
- Label: American
- Producer: Jack Joseph Puig and The Black Crowes

The Black Crowes chronology
Amorica (1994)	Three Snakes and One Charm (1996)	By Your Side (1999)

Professional ratings
Review scores
Source	Rating
AllMusic	3/5 stars
CMJ	?
Entertainment Weekly	B−
NME	(8/10)
Rolling Stone	3/5 stars
Wall of Sound	(80/100)

Three Snakes and One Charm is the fourth studio album by American rock band the Black Crowes. It was released on July 23, 1996, and is their final release on American Recordings.

== Background ==
During the "Amorica or Bust" tour of 1995, many of the relationships within the Black Crowes had soured, including that of brothers Chris and Rich Robinson. "We just fucking hated each other," Rich noted in the September 1996 issue of Acoustic Guitar magazine. "It's just a normal phase bands go through. There was a lot of emotional baggage, and everyone got on each other's nerves. We almost broke up a few times, but finally we all let go and moved on."

Chris echoed his brother's sentiment in the March 1996 issue of Guitar World magazine. "Everyone goes through changes," he stated. "The trick is trying to remember that and keep it together, and having respect for everyone and not judging people because you're all goin' through changes. Perseverance is the thing. You have to get your ego in place."

With this new attitude in place, the band began planning what would be their fourth studio album. Their previous album, 1994's Amorica, was very much a studio recording, with a great deal of overdubs and other musical flourishes. This was a distinct change from the band's sophomore effort, 1992's The Southern Harmony and Musical Companion, which was recorded in eight days with little to no overdubs. A great deal of this was attributed to producer Jack Joseph Puig, who manned the board for Amorica. "The eight day album was coming off of 15 months of touring and we were still just flying," then-bassist Johnny Colt told RockNet in 1995. "This time we took some time off beforehand and tried to slow down...We consciously tried to take more time. I'm not even saying we really needed it, but we wanted to try it. We have worked ourselves into a position to afford to spend a little bit more time and try to make a different step."

Chris Robinson recalled the Amorica process: "It was hard to make because we were depressed and in an angry, confused place. Most of it was personal shit."

Rather than make another studio record like Amorica, the band opted for a different approach in the latter months of 1995. "Chris suggested that rather than book a hotel for six months, it'd be cooler if we rented a house for everyone to stay in," Rich Robinson noted in 1996. "So Chris moved into the house, and I brought my little board over to work on the demos. It sounded so cool that I brought my big board over, and the rest of my shit, and we rented a Neve sidecar for 10 extra channels. And we just did it."

== Writing and production ==
As pre-production for Three Snakes and One Charm began, several songs were written with Chris and Rich Robinson on different sides of the United States. Rich would write and record music in Atlanta, and send his results to Chris in Los Angeles. "The long-distance writing was just something we did to get the process more concrete," Rich told Acoustic Guitar magazine in 1996. "I had a lot of bits and pieces that I'd written on tour and I needed to hear what Chris would do with them."

Once the basic ideas were recorded to tape, the band assembled in the house in Atlanta (dubbed Chateau de la Crowe by the band) to begin the Three Snakes sessions. Keyboardist Eddie Harsch recalls: "When we got to Atlanta, Chris and Rich put us in a room and played us the demos. The record was basically written. Twelve songs with vocals, dogs barking in the background, everything. We just looked at each other, like, 'What do you want us to do? It's all here.'" There proved to be a great deal more to do, with the band spending several weeks refining their original demos. Plus, a few other songs were written on the spot, including "Under a Mountain" and "Better When You're Not Alone." In total, the band recorded 26 songs during the sessions.

It was during the recording of Three Snakes that the band decided to introduce new elements into the music, the most noticeable being a horn section on "(Only) Halfway to Everywhere" and "Let Me Share The Ride." "That was the Dirty Dozen Brass Band," Rich commented in 1996. "They opened for us last year (1995) through the whole American leg of (our) tour. Chris just said, 'Fuck it. We've never had horns that we like. Let's go for it.'"

The band attributed the sonic textures of Three Snakes to the nuances of recording in a house. "It's a totally different vibe doing it in a house, much more conducive to being creative," Rich Robinson commented in 1996. Other members of the band credited the more communal atmosphere of Chateau de la Crowe with making the album a success. "We lived and breathed together all day long," remembers then-bassist Johnny Colt. "It was a caravan of people; people upstairs watching crazy art films, people cutting tracks and eating food. There were dogs running everywhere. And (producer) Jack (Joseph Puig) was pulling his hair out over the whole thing of course."

Guitarist Marc Ford concurred with Colt's sentiment, adding that the atmosphere created by recording in a house fostered his musical relationship with Rich Robinson. "It just keeps flowering," he noted in 1996. "Rich used to insist he was a rhythm player, and I told him to stick his toe as a lead player in the water a little bit, and now we're playing with each other, listening to each other. You can do all that sound-weaving."

With the bulk of the recording process done, the band returned to Ocean Way Studios in Los Angeles to put on the finishing touches and begin the mastering process.

== Promotion and release ==
The Black Crowes began the supporting tour for Three Snakes and One Charm on July 5, 1996, in Burbank, California, where the album was given its world premiere. The album would see its official release on July 23, 1996, several weeks into a world tour that would go straight through the end of the year and into the next, expanding their in-concert repertoire to more than 90 songs. As a means of promotion, the band performed several radio and television broadcasts to showcase the new album. The most noteworthy of these appearances came when the band appeared on the television program VH1 Storytellers in the Summer of 1996. The show was relatively new at the time, with each episode capturing artists performing in front of a (mostly small and intimate) live audience, telling stories about their music, writing experiences and memories. The Black Crowes' installment was the fifth in the series, which saw 87 episodes over its original run.

Three Snakes garnered generally positive reviews upon its release. Stephen Thomas Erlewine gave album three stars on AllMusic, stating the album was "a winning album, mainly because the Black Crowes' musicianship continues to deepen -- the musical fusions and eclecticism are seamless." Rolling Stone magazine also gave the album three stars, noting that it "works best when it forsakes album-oriented pretension for singular clarity, from the oblique Beatles references on 'Nebakanezer' and 'Bring On, Bring On' to the Sly Stone-cum-Al Green funk of '(Only) Halfway to Everywhere' and the warm acoustic resignation of 'Better When You're Not Alone.'"

The album's cover logo resembles a 45 rpm record insert. A limited box set edition of the album was also made available, comprising seven 7-inch vinyl EPs, a 45 rpm custom adapter in shape of the album's cover logo, and a one-sided poster of the band.

== Track listing ==
All songs written by Chris Robinson and Rich Robinson, except where noted.

1. "Under a Mountain" – 4:10
2. "Good Friday" – 3:51
3. "Nebakanezer" – 4:07
4. "One Mirror Too Many" – 3:34
5. "Blackberry" – 3:25
6. "Girl from a Pawnshop" – 6:17
7. "(Only) Halfway to Everywhere" – 3:59
8. "Bring On, Bring On" – 3:56
9. "How Much for Your Wings?" – 3:27
10. "Let Me Share the Ride" – 3:18
11. "Better When You're Not Alone" – 4:10
12. "Evil Eye" – 4:10

1998 reissue bonus tracks

13. "Just Say You're Sorry" – 3:30
14. "Mellow Down Easy" (Willie Dixon) – 3:43

== Personnel ==
The Black Crowes

- Chris Robinson – vocals, blues harp
- Rich Robinson – guitar, backing vocals, autoharp on "Good Friday"
- Marc Ford – guitar
- Johnny Colt – bass guitar
- Steve Gorman – drums
- Eddie Harsch – keyboards

Additional personnel

- Dirty Dozen Brass Band: Gregory Davis, Roger Lewis, Effrem Towns, Revert Andrews, Kevin Harris – horns/arrangements
- Bruce Kaphan – pedal steel
- Rik Taylor – banjo
- Gary "Mudbone" Cooper – backing vocals
- Garry Shider – backing vocals
- Barbara Mitchell – backing vocals
- Erica Stewart – backing vocals

== Charts ==
Chart (1996)	Peak position
Australian Albums (ARIA)	23
Austrian Albums (Ö3 Austria)	35
Belgian Albums (Ultratop Flanders)	47
Dutch Albums (Album Top 100)	39
Finnish Albums (Suomen virallinen lista)	19
German Albums (Offizielle Top 100)	38
Scottish Albums (OCC)	18
Swedish Albums (Sverigetopplistan)	23
Swiss Albums (Schweizer Hitparade)	35
UK Albums (OCC)	17
US Billboard 200	15
