= Warpaint Live =

Live album by The Black Crowes
- Released: April 28, 2009
- Recorded: March 20, 2008
- Venue: The Wiltern, Los Angeles, California
- Genre: Blues-rock, hard rock, southern rock
- Length: 96:23
- Label: Eagle

The Black Crowes chronology
Warpaint (2008)	Warpaint Live (2009)	Before the Frost...Until the Freeze (2009)

Professional ratings
Review scores
Source	Rating
AllMusic	3/5 stars
Classic Rock	(DVD)
PopMatters	6/10 stars

Warpaint Live is a live album by American southern rock band The Black Crowes, released on April 28, 2009. This is the first Black Crowes live album since Freak 'n' Roll in 2006 and it features live versions of the whole Warpaint album. Recorded live on March 20, 2008 at The Wiltern in Los Angeles, CA. The double CD precedes the release of the live concert DVD later in 2009.

== Track listing ==
All songs written by Chris Robinson and Rich Robinson, except where noted.

=== Disc one ===
1. "Goodbye Daughters of the Revolution" – 5:20
2. "Walk Believer Walk " – 4:55
3. "Oh, Josephine" – 7:59
4. "Evergreen" – 4:21
5. "Wee Who See the Deep" – 7:35
6. "Locust Street" – 4:14
7. "Movin' On Down the Line" – 7:58
8. "Wounded Bird" – 4:39
9. "God's Got It" (Reverend Charlie Jackson) – 4:26
10. "There's Gold in Them Hills" – 5:04
11. "Whoa Mule" – 6:53

=== Disc two ===
1. "Poor Elijah – Tribute to Johnson" (Delaney Bramlett, Jim Ford, Leon Russell) – 5:52
2. "Darling of the Underground Press" – 4:25
3. "Bad Luck Blue Eyes Goodbye" – 7:56
4. "Don't Know Why" (Bonnie Bramlett, Eric Clapton) – 5:17
5. "Torn and Frayed" (Mick Jagger, Keith Richards) – 5:16
6. "Hey Grandma" (Jerry Miller, Don Stevenson) – 4:13
