= Brothers of a Feather: Live at the Roxy =

Brothers of a Feather : Live at the Roxy

Live album by Chris and Rich Robinson
- Released: July 10, 2007
- Recorded: 2006
- Genre: Rock
- Label: Eagle

Professional ratings
Review scores
Source	Rating
Allmusic	3.5/5 stars

Brothers of a Feather: Live at the Roxy is a live album by Chris and Rich Robinson of The Black Crowes. It was released on July 10, 2007, and was later followed by a DVD release with extra tracks in September 2007. The album featured two new songs, some old Black Crowes songs and some covers. The album is a compilation from several shows at the Roxy Theatre in Los Angeles, California recorded during the 2006 Brothers of a Feather tour. Most songs feature only one or two guitars and vocals, with occasional accompaniment from Mona Lisa Young and Charity White, the Black Crowes' backing-vocals duo, as well as a guest appearance by tenor saxophonist Dave Ellis of The Left Coast Horns.

== Track listing ==
1. "Horsehead"
2. "Cursed Diamond"
3. "Over the Hill" (John Martyn cover)
4. "Magic Rooster Blues" (previously unreleased Black Crowes song)
5. "My Heart's Killing Me"
6. "Better When You're Not Alone" (DVD only)
7. "Forgiven Song" (Rich Robinson solo song)
8. "Someday Past the Sunset" (previously unreleased Chris Robinson solo song)
9. "Welcome to the Goodtimes" (DVD only)
10. "Roll Um Easy" (Little Feat cover)
11. "Soul Singing" (DVD only)
12. "Cold Boy Smile" (previously unreleased Black Crowes song)
13. "Bring On Bring On" (DVD only)
14. "Driving Wheel" (David Wiffen cover, as popularized by Tom Rush)
15. "Leave It Alone" (Rich Robinson solo song)
16. "Polly" (Gene Clark cover)
17. "Darling of the Underground Press"
18. "Jealous Again" (DVD only)
19. "Forever Young" (DVD only) (Bob Dylan cover)
20. "Thorn in My Pride"
