= Rob Clores =

American, New York-based keyboard player

- Origin: New Jersey, United States
- Genres: Rock, Pop, Electronica
- Occupations: Musician, Songwriter, Producer, Musical Director
- Instruments: Keyboards, Guitar, Vocals
- Website: http://www.robclores.com/

Rob Clores is an American, New York–based keyboard player and composer who has toured and recorded with Steve Forbert, Jesse Malin, The Black Crowes, Tom Jones, Men at Work frontman Colin Hay, Marius Muller Westernhagen, Cycomotogoat, Enrique Iglesias, Blues Traveler frontman John Popper, Spin Doctors frontman Chris Barron, Southside Johnny & The Asbury Jukes, among others.

== Solo E.P. ==
His solo project Split Second Meltdown released an E.P. in 2020. It features original songs with a grunge alternative Rock style. Contributing musicians include Charlie Paxson on drums and Sol Walker on bass from Death Diamond, John JD DeServio from Black Label Society, Bob Pantella from Monster Magnet and Ken Dubman, Jimmy Messer, Tony Bruno and Andee Blacksugar on guitars.

Split Second Meltdown's cover of the Jimi Hendrix song Foxy Lady was released in the U.S. on June 11, 2021. It features Guns N' Roses guitarist Richard Fortus.

== Equipment ==
Clores is endorsed by Nord, Moog and Sequential.

- Nord Stage 3
- Moog Voyager
- Moog Little Phatty
- Prophet X
- Prophet 6
- Mellotron 400M
- Hammond B3
- Hohner Clavinet D6
- Wurlitzer 200A
- Hohner accordion
