= Before the Frost...Until the Freeze =

Studio album by The Black Crowes
- Released: August 31, 2009
- Genres: Southern rock, blues rock, hard rock
- Length: 101:00
- Label: Silver Arrow
- Producer: Paul Stacey

The Black Crowes chronology
Warpaint (2008)	Before the Frost...Until the Freeze (2009)	Croweology (2010)

Before the Frost...Until the Freeze is the eighth studio album by American rock band The Black Crowes. It was recorded before a live audience at Levon Helm's Woodstock, New York, studio, The Barn, in late February and early March, 2009. The album was produced by longtime band collaborator Paul Stacey and released on Silver Arrow Records. The CD itself is designed to have the appearance of a vinyl record. Originally, only the Before the Frost portion of the double album was available on CD, and the CD purchase came with a code allowing download of the Until the Freeze portion from the Black Crowes website. A vinyl version was also released, featuring all the same songs but in a different running order. Before the Frost...Until the Freeze is the band's last album of original material to feature longtime drummer Steve Gorman, guitarist Luther Dickinson and keyboardist Adam MacDougall.

== Track listing ==
All tracks written by Chris and Rich Robinson, except where noted.

=== CD version ===
Before the Frost... [CD]

1. "Good Morning Captain" – 3:24
2. "Been a Long Time (Waiting on Love)" – 7:47
3. "Appaloosa" – 3:35
4. "A Train Still Makes a Lonely Sound" – 4:23
5. "I Ain't Hiding" (C. Robinson) – 5:57
6. "Kept My Soul" – 5:23
7. "What Is Home?" (R. Robinson) – 5:13
8. "Houston Don't Dream About Me" – 5:05
9. "Make Glad" – 4:18
10. "And the Band Played On..." – 4:12
11. "The Last Place That Love Lives" (C. Robinson) – 4:57

...Until the Freeze [download]

1. "Aimless Peacock" – 6:40
2. "The Shady Grove" – 4:42
3. "The Garden Gate" – 4:21
4. "Greenhorn" – 7:12
5. "Shine Along" – 4:47
6. "Roll Old Jeremiah" (C. Robinson) – 4:40
7. "Lady of Avenue A" – 5:20
8. "So Many Times" (Chris Hillman, Stephen Stills) – 4:53
9. "Fork in the River" (C. Robinson) – 4:11

=== Vinyl version ===
Side 1

1. "Aimless Peacock" – 6:40
2. "Good Morning Captain" – 3:24
3. "Been a Long Time (Waiting on Love)" – 7:47
4. "Greenhorn" – 7:12

Side 2

1. "Appaloosa" – 3:35
2. "The Shady Grove" – 4:42
3. "The Garden Gate" – 4:21
4. "Shine Along" – 4:47
5. "Roll Old Jeremiah" (C. Robinson) – 4:40
6. "Houston Don't Dream About Me" – 5:05

Side 3

1. "I Ain't Hiding" (C. Robinson) – 5:57
2. "Kept My Soul" – 5:23
3. "Lady of Ave. A" – 5:20
4. "Make Glad" – 4:18
5. "And the Band Played On..." – 4:12

Side 4

1. "What Is Home?" (R. Robinson) – 5:13
2. "So Many Times" (Hillman, Stills) – 4:53
3. "A Train Still Makes a Lonely Sound" – 4:23
4. "Fork in the River" (C. Robinson) – 4:11
5. "The Last Place That Love Lives" (C. Robinson) – 4:57

== Reception ==
Professional ratings
Aggregate scores
Source	Rating
Metacritic	(75/100)
Review scores
Source	Rating
Allmusic	4.5/5 stars
Los Angeles Times	2.5/4 stars
Paste	(8.1/10)
PopMatters	8/10 stars
Robert Christgau	(2-star Honorable Mention)
Rolling Stone	3.5/5 stars
Sputnikmusic	3.5/5 stars
Uncut	3/5 stars

Before the Frost...Until the Freeze received generally favorable reviews upon its release, receiving a 75/100 critic score and a 9/10 user score on Metacritic. Paste noted the album "captures the best aspects of one of rock’s finest eras: a balance of structured songwriting and loose grooves, catchy choruses and meandering solos, hard rocking songs and easy-going attitude," while All Music Guide note that the band "wear their years proudly on this terrific album, sounding like the veteran roadhounds they've always aspired to be." Many critics also noted the renewed stylistic approach of the band on Before the Frost..., Uncut calling the album "an inspired move" and The Record Review commenting that the record "feels right, as if this is exactly the record that they needed to make at this point, both to separate from their musical past as well as to open up the future."

== Cabin Fever ==
The Black Crowes also released a film on DVD documenting the recording of the album, entitled Cabin Fever, which included several songs not featured on the album.

Track listing

1. "Aimless Peacock"
2. "Good Morning Captain"
3. "Shady Grove"
4. "Oh Sweet Nuthin'" (Velvet Underground cover)
5. "Garden Gate"
6. "Roll Old Jeremiah"
7. "Appaloosa"
8. "Little Lizzie Mae"
9. "What Is Home"
10. "Been a Long Time (Waiting on Love)"
11. "Shine Along"

Bonus tracks

1. "Shady Grove"
2. "The Dolphins" (Fred Neil cover)

== Personnel ==
The Black Crowes

- Chris Robinson – vocals, harmonica, guitars
- Rich Robinson – guitars, sitar, vocals
- Steve Gorman – drums, percussion
- Sven Pipien – bass, vocals
- Luther Dickinson – guitars, mandolin
- Adam MacDougall – keyboards, vocals

Additional personnel

- Larry Campbell – banjo, fiddle, pedal steel
- Joe Magistro – percussion

Production

- Paul Stacey – producer, engineer, mixing
- Justin Guip – engineer
- Chris Edwards – engineer
- James Russick Smith, Brendan McDonough – assistant engineer
- Phillip Parsons, Ben Hampson – assistant mixing engineer
- Pete Angelus – manager (Angelus Entertainment)
- Amy Finkle – manager (Angelus Entertainment, East Coast)
- Adam "Cutlets" Richards – band assistant
- Arik Roper – illustrations
- Alan Forbes – poster art

== Charts ==
Chart (2009)	Peak position
Australian Albums (ARIA)	167
Belgian Albums (Ultratop Flanders)	94
Dutch Albums (Album Top 100)	51
French Albums (SNEP)	92
German Albums (Offizielle Top 100)	84
Scottish Albums (Official Charts)	40
Spanish Albums (Promusicae)	47
Swedish Albums (Sverigetopplistan)	59
UK Albums (Official Charts)	47
US Billboard 200	5
