= The Black Crowes =

American rock band

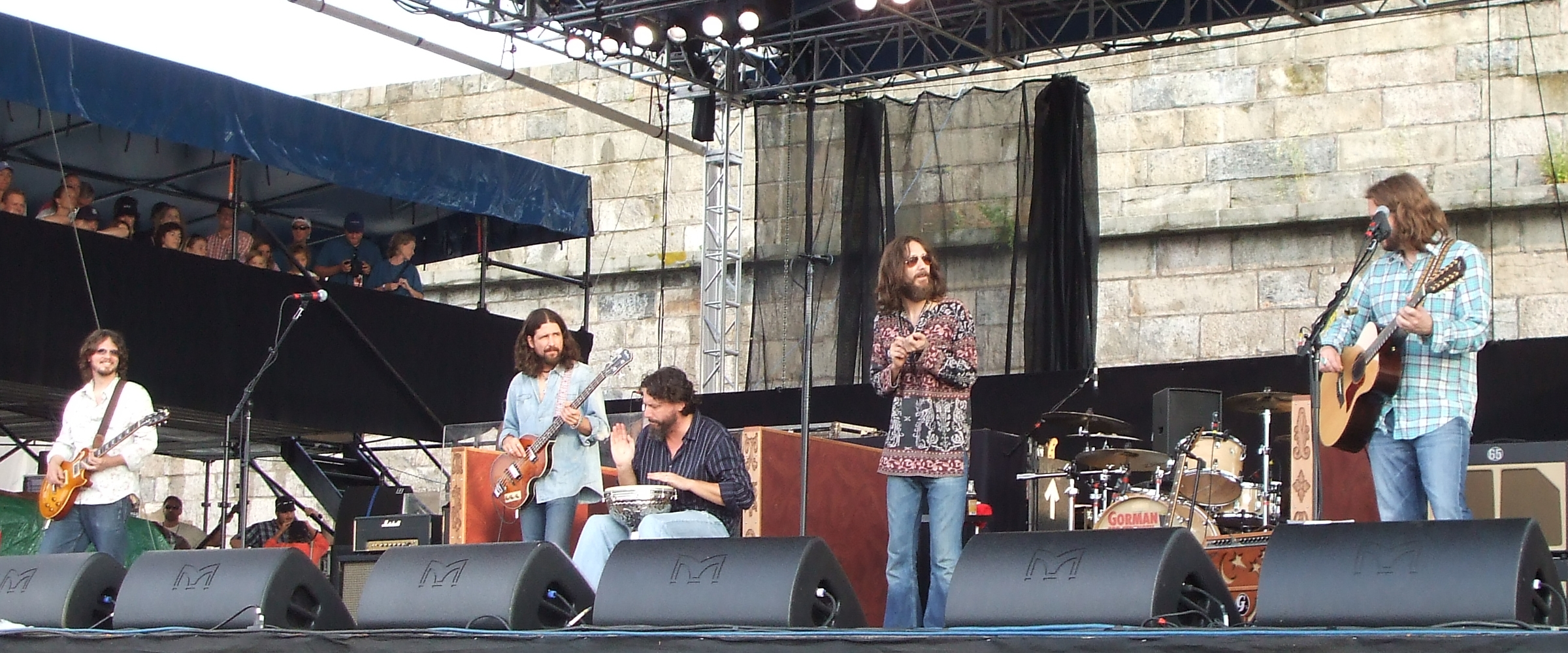
- The Black Crowes in 2008

Background information
- Also known as: Mr. Crowe's Garden (1984–1989)
- Origin: Atlanta, Georgia, U.S.
- Genres: Southern rock; blues rock; hard rock; roots rock; jam band
- Works: Discography
- Years active: 1984–2002; 2005–2015; 2019–present
- Labels: Def American; Columbia; V2; Silver Arrow
- Members: Chris Robinson; Rich Robinson
- Past members: See: List of the Black Crowes members
- Website: theblackcrowes.com

The Black Crowes are an American rock band formed in Atlanta, Georgia in 1984. Their discography includes ten studio albums, four live albums, and several charting singles. The band was signed to Def American Recordings in 1989 by producer George Drakoulias and released their debut album, Shake Your Money Maker, the following year. Their follow-up, The Southern Harmony and Musical Companion, reached the top of the Billboard 200 in 1992. The albums Amorica (1994), Three Snakes and One Charm (1996), By Your Side (1999), and Lions (2001) followed, with each showing moderate popularity but failing to capture the chart successes of the band's first two albums. After a hiatus from 2002 to 2005, the band regrouped and toured for several years before releasing Warpaint in 2008, which reached number 5 on the Billboard chart.

Following the release of their greatest hits/acoustic double album Croweology in August 2010, the band started a 20th anniversary tour that was followed by a second hiatus. After touring in 2013, the band announced another breakup in 2015, reforming in late 2019 to announce a 2020 tour in support of the 30th anniversary of Shake Your Money Maker. By this point the band had none of its original line-up left except for Chris and Rich Robinson, the only two constant members of the band over its entire history.

The Black Crowes have sold more than 30 million albums, and are listed at number 92 on VH1's 100 Greatest Artists of Hard Rock. They were labeled by Melody Maker as "The Most Rock 'n' Roll Rock 'n' Roll Band in the World" and the readers of Rolling Stone voted them 'Best New American Band' in 1990. Their ninth studio album, Happiness Bastards, was released in March 2024 and nominated for the Best Rock Album Grammy later that year. In 2025 and 2026, the band was nominated for the Rock and Roll Hall of Fame.

== History ==
=== Formation: 1984–1989 ===
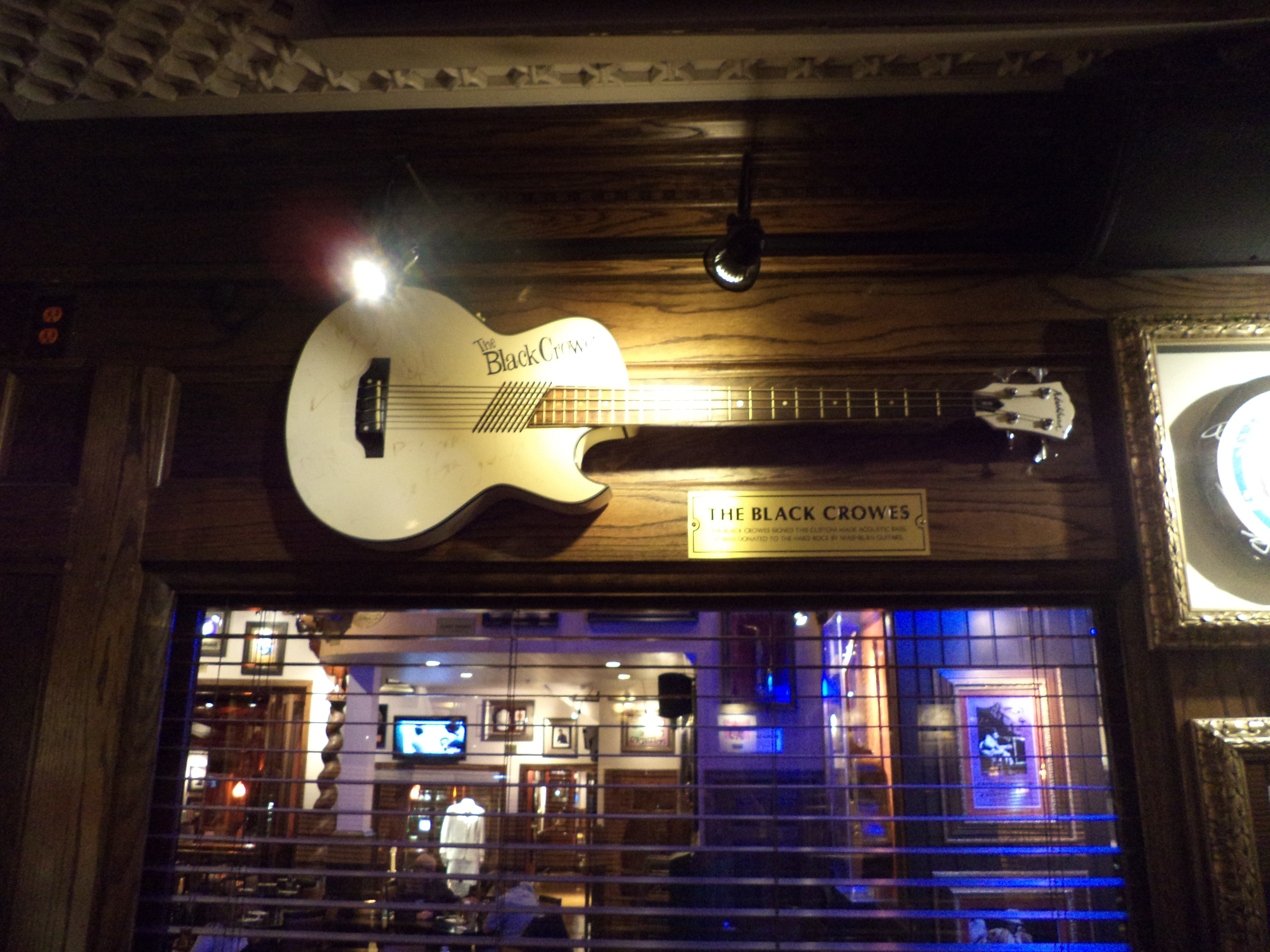
A tribute to the band in an Atlanta Hard Rock Cafe

The first incarnation of the band, "Mr. Crowe's Garden", named after Leonard Leslie Brooke's children's book Johnny Crow's Garden, formed in 1984 in Atlanta, Georgia. Influenced by contemporary local acts like R.E.M., as well as 1960s psychedelic pop and classic Southern rock, they gradually evolved into a revivalist band dedicated to 1970s-era blues rock. Although the band has had a high turnover rate throughout their history, the driving force behind the band has always been brothers Chris and Rich Robinson, who initially formed the band while attending Walton High School.

The first professional demo the Robinson brothers did was for A&M Records in 1987. The band's manager at the time, Dave Macias, got in touch with A&M rep Aaron Jacoves, from Los Angeles, who offered the band a 'demo' deal and arranged the band's first of several demo sessions. It was held at Steve Gronback's studio in Carrboro, North Carolina. They were paid $2,000 by Jacoves to cover production costs. Jeff Sullivan (of Drivin N Cryin fame) played drums on the first demo, while subsequent demo recordings featured Steve Gorman on the drums. Gorman played on the subsequent A&M demos in Carrboro, North Carolina, during mid and late 1987, although as a guest drummer at first until he officially joined Mr. Crowe's Garden later that year. The band was originally offered a record deal in 1987 under the label "Dog Gone" by R.E.M.'s manager Jefferson Holt but declined.

The band played as a quartet in New York City clubs such as "Drums" and CBGB in 1988. In 1989, the band - which had stabilized as a five-piece including the Robinsons, Gorman, Johnny Colt and Jeff Cease - met George Drakoulias, who signed the band at Def American. Drakoulias turned the band on to music it had not heard before like The Faces and Humble Pie. Under Drakoulias' influence, the band began covering the Rolling Stones and Rich began playing in open-G tunings for Mr. Crowe's Garden songs. At this point, the band also changed their name, and considered ideas such as "The Heartless Crowes" and "The Stone Mountain Crowes", before settling on "The Black Crowes".

=== Height of fame: 1990–1995 ===
The Black Crowes released their first studio album, Shake Your Money Maker, in 1990. Supported by the singles "Hard to Handle", "She Talks to Angels", "Jealous Again", "Twice As Hard", "Sister Luck", and "Seeing Things", the album received multi-platinum certification and eventually sold more than five million copies. Their cover of Otis Redding's "Hard to Handle", and acoustic ballad "She Talks to Angels", both achieved top 30 positions on the Billboard Hot 100 in 1991. The band opened for ZZ Top on a tour sponsored by Miller Beer, from which they were fired in March 1991 after Chris Robinson's verbal tirade aimed at Miller. The band launched its own tour that May and later took part in a Monsters of Rock tour in Europe, where they opened for Metallica, AC/DC, Mötley Crüe and Queensrÿche.

Due to the prevalence of Chuck Leavell's piano and organ parts on the first release, in 1991 the band hired a keyboardist of its own, Eddie Harsch. He became a permanent member of the group beginning with the "High as the Moon" tour in 1992.

After replacing guitarist Jeff Cease with Marc Ford from blues-rock power trio Burning Tree, the band released its second album The Southern Harmony and Musical Companion in 1992. The album debuted at number 1 on the Billboard 200. The effort spawned the singles "Remedy", "Sting Me", "Thorn in My Pride" and "Hotel Illness", all of which topped the Billboard Album Rock Tracks chart. "Remedy" and "Thorn in My Pride" also charted on the Hot 100 in 1992.

In 1994, the now six-piece band released Amorica, after scrapping the unreleased album Tall the previous year. The album eventually achieved Gold status, selling over 500,000 copies. The cover featured a picture of a woman's crotch wearing a U.S. flag thong with visible pubic hair, which was taken from a 1976 issue of Hustler magazine. As some stores would not carry the album because of the cover, a different version was released simultaneously with a solid black background, showing only the triangle featuring the flag.

=== Middle era: 1996–2001 ===
Three Snakes and One Charm was released in July 1996. The band's support tour included a summer stint with the 1997 Furthur Festival, along with Ratdog, Bruce Hornsby and others. During this period, the band recorded an album called Band, which was scrapped. Guitarist Marc Ford was fired and bassist Johnny Colt subsequently left the group, dissolving the Crowes' line-up for the previous three albums. The unreleased tracks from Tall and Band surfaced among tape trading circles and were later officially released on The Lost Crowes (2006).

The band regrouped, adding Sven Pipien on bass prior to its next recording sessions. By Your Side was released in January 1999; the album stripped away the more adventurous sounds of Amorica and Three Snakes and One Charm in favor of leaner, soul-influenced songs. Guitarist Audley Freed, formerly of Cry of Love, joined prior to the recording of By Your Side but was not included in the recording sessions.

In October 1999, the band was joined by Led Zeppelin guitarist Jimmy Page for two pairs of shows in New York and Los Angeles, and also at the Centrum in Worcester, Massachusetts, yielding a live release, Live at the Greek on TVT Records. Due to contractual issues with Columbia, Live at the Greek did not feature any of the band's songs performed with Page. The collaboration led to a more extensive tour with Page and The Who in summer 2000, during which Pipien was replaced by Greg Rzab. Following the tour, singer Chris Robinson married actress Kate Hudson, before heading back to the studio to record the band's sixth studio album.

In May 2001, the band released Lions on Virgin mogul Richard Branson's V2 record label; the album peaked at number 20 on the charts. The band launched its support of the album with the month-long Tour of Brotherly Love with Oasis and Spacehog in May and June 2001. Throughout the rest of 2001, the band embarked on the "Listen Massive" headlining tour in support of Lions, which spanned Europe and Japan before concluding with 36 U.S. shows. The band effectively dissolved in January 2002 with the departure of drummer Steve Gorman and an announcement that the band was "taking a hiatus."

=== First hiatus and reunion: 2002–2005 ===
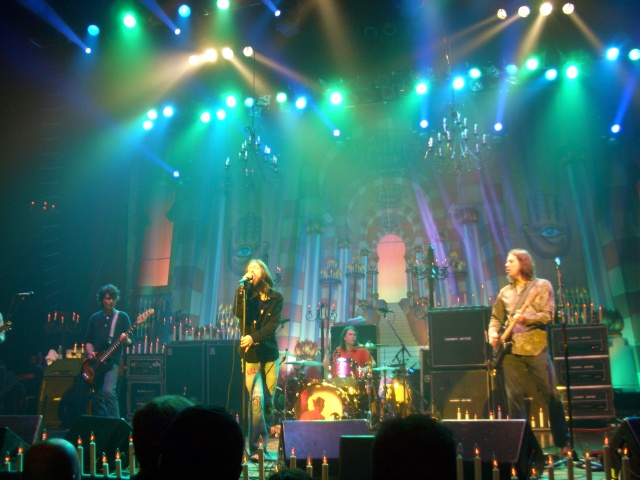
The Black Crowes playing at the Hammerstein Ballroom, 2005

A live album pieced together from two 2001 shows performed at Boston's Orpheum Theatre was released in August 2002. In 2004, some members of the band did reunite to play "Sometimes Salvation" with Gov't Mule at the 2004 Jammy Awards. During the hiatus, Chris Robinson released albums New Earth Mud in 2002 and This Magnificent Distance in 2004. Meanwhile, Rich Robinson formed a short-lived band called Hookah Brown before releasing his own solo album, Paper, in 2004.

In early 2005, the Robinson brothers and Eddie Harsch reassembled the band, bringing Marc Ford and Sven Pipien back into the fold and in the absence of founding member Steve Gorman, recruited drummer Bill Dobrow, from Rich's solo band. Dobrow's tenure was short-lived, however, as Gorman rejoined the band during a four-night stand at the Tabernacle in Atlanta. The reinvigorated band continued to tour throughout 2005, including a summer tour opening for Tom Petty and the Heartbreakers and five nights at The Fillmore in San Francisco. The second show at The Fillmore was filmed in high definition and released later in 2006 as Freak 'n' Roll into the Fog on DVD, Blu-ray and audio CD.

=== Changing lineup and renewed success: 2006–2009 ===
In fall 2006, Eddie Harsch and Marc Ford left the band. Replacing Harsch and Ford were Rob Clores and Paul Stacey, respectively. In August 2007, the band replaced Clores with Adam MacDougall. Stacey's tenure was never intended to be permanent and when the band invited guitar player Luther Dickinson from North Mississippi Allstars to perform on their upcoming record, entitled Warpaint Dickinson officially replaced Stacey as guitarist. Stacey continued to work with the band, however, as producer of Warpaint.

A live album entitled Live at the Roxy, culled from the 2006 Brothers of a Feather performances (featuring Chris and Rich Robinson performing mostly acoustic sets) was released on July 10, 2007. The album featured performances of old and new Black Crowes material mixed with covers, taken from a three-night run at The Roxy in Los Angeles in early 2006.

The Black Crowes' first album since reforming, Warpaint was released on March 3, 2008. Warpaint was critically acclaimed and the album landed at number 5 on the Billboard 200, the band's best debut since The Southern Harmony and Musical Companion topped the charts. The band launched an international tour March 24 when they played the East Coast Blues & Roots Music Festival in Australia. The band continued its Australia and New Zealand tour—the first since 1992—through April 5, before departing for a European trek. A US tour began in May and concluded in December with another five-night stand at The Fillmore in San Francisco. Also that year, the Black Crowes filed a lawsuit against country singer Gretchen Wilson, claiming that she infringed upon their copyright for the song "Jealous Again".

In April 2009, the band released a two-disc live album entitled Warpaint Live. The first disc consists of the Warpaint album played in its entirety, while the second disc is made up of catalog classics and cover selections. The entire performance contained on the set was recorded on March 20, 2008, at the Wiltern Theater in Los Angeles. A DVD of the same performance was released on June 30, 2009. The band released its eighth studio album, Before the Frost...Until the Freeze, later that year. A CD purchase of the album is accompanied with a download code to receive the album's companion release, ...Until the Freeze. The vinyl version is a double album that includes all of the songs but in a different running order. These albums resulted from four days of recording (a fifth performance was described by Chris Robinson as a "victory lap") at Levon Helms Studio in Woodstock, and present a combination of new material and a few new cover songs recorded live in front of an audience. Continuing the trend set with Warpaint, the Crowes incorporated more of their country and bluegrass roots in these recordings as well as venturing into new avenues such as disco in the song "I Ain't Hidin'". A DVD of these sessions, including some interview and backstage segments, was released named Cabin Fever.

=== "Final" years: 2010–2015 ===
On April 21, 2010, the Black Crowes announced an August 3 release date for a double, all-acoustic album Croweology, as well as tour dates for the "Say Goodnight to the Bad Guys" tour, which featured two 90-minute sets at the majority of shows: one acoustic and one electric. After the tour, the band went on another "indefinite" hiatus. On November 26, 2010, the Black Crowes released a special edition Record Store Day Black Friday 10" vinyl picture disc with download card, called Say Goodnight to The Bad Guys/Remedy (acoustic live) for independent record stores. The band was also inducted into the Georgia Music Hall of Fame, performing Georgia on My Mind with Chuck Leavell at the 2010 ceremony.

After ending the U.S. tour at The Fillmore in December 2010, the Crowes played nine Goodnight to the Bad Guys shows in Europe in July 2011. These included festivals in Italy, Spain, the Netherlands and Belgium, as well as a few headlining shows where, comparable to the U.S. tour, they played a 90-minute acoustic and 90-minute electric set. The final four shows included two in London (the second of which featured a Jimmy Page-led encore), followed by two that saw them return to Amsterdam's Paradiso.

On December 25, 2012, it was announced that the Crowes would embark on a five-show UK trek in March 2013, followed by a 21-date U.S. tour from April to early May. Instead of Luther Dickinson, Jackie Greene would play guitar and provide backup vocals.

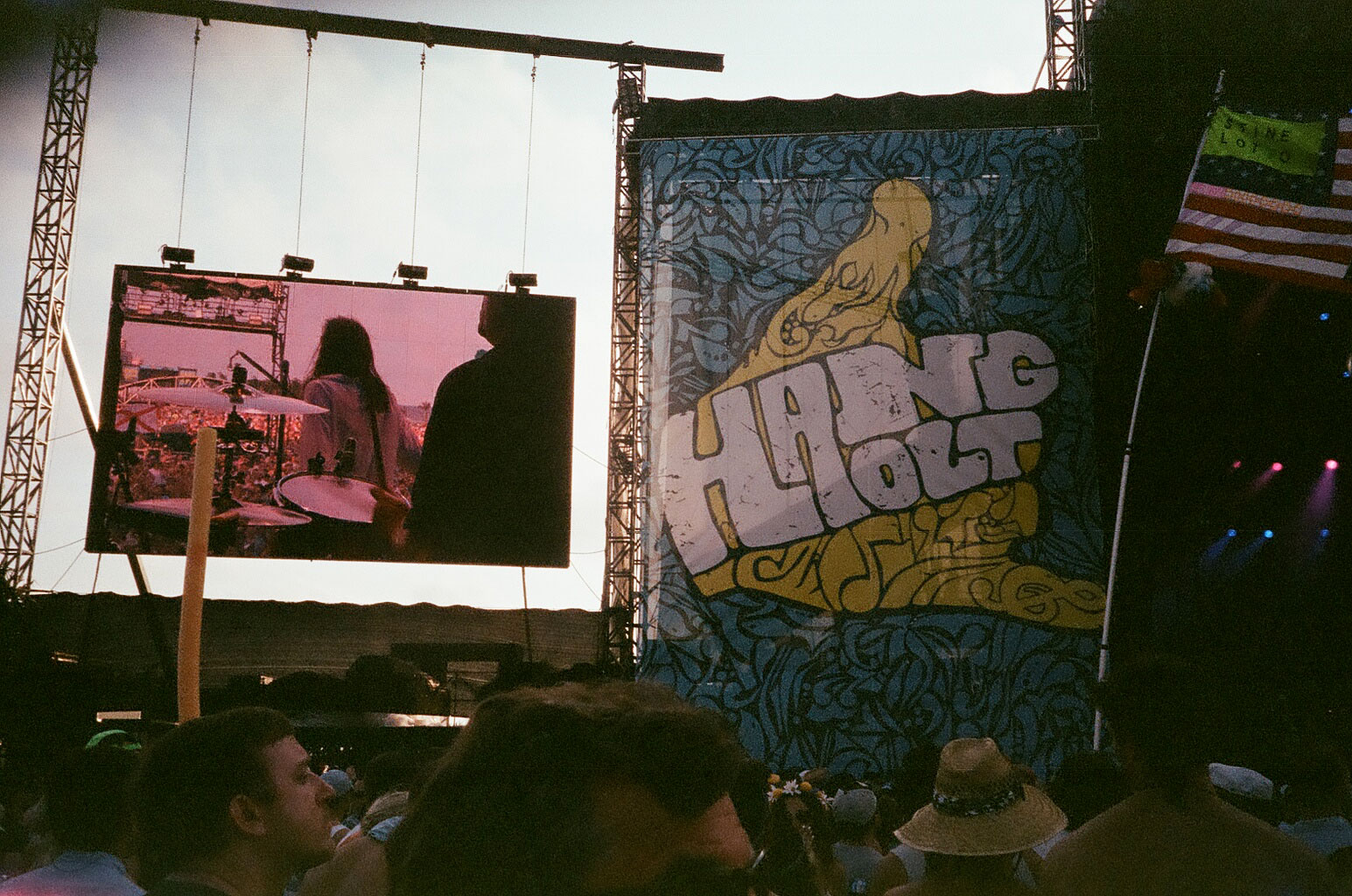
The Black Crowes at the 2013 Hangout Music Festival

On March 19, 2013, the band released its fourth live album, Wiser for the Time. It was released as a digital download and as a four-record vinyl set. The album was recorded during the band's 2010 series of concerts in New York City. On April 23, 2013, the Black Crowes returned to Atlanta and played at The Tabernacle in front of a capacity crowd. In July 2013, the band kicked off a tour with the Tedeschi Trucks Band. They returned to hiatus in December that year, but played a show in Boston the following February (a benefit event for the Big Brothers association).

On January 15, 2015, Rich Robinson announced the final breakup of the band due to a disagreement with his brother Chris Robinson over an alleged proposal regarding ownership of the band. In an interview, drummer Steve Gorman indicated that prior to the breakup, the Black Crowes had been discussing a tour.

=== Post breakup: 2015–2018 ===
Following the Crowes' breakup, band members moved on to other musical projects, some of which were active prior to the band's disbandment.

Chris Robinson continued performing with the Chris Robinson Brotherhood, a band he formed in 2011 which also includes Adam MacDougall. He released his third studio album with them, Any Way You Love, We Know How You Feel, in 2016, followed by the EP If You Lived Here, You Would Be Home By Now later the same year. In 2017, the CRB released Barefoot in the Head. The CRB also released four live albums: Betty's Blends Volumes 1, 2, 3, and Betty's Midwestern Magic Blends. Chris Robinson performed a few solo acoustic shows during which he played several Black Crowes songs, including "Hotel Illness" and "Bad Luck, Blue Eyes Goodbye".

In 2018, Chris Robinson formed the band As the Crow Flies, which performed songs from the Black Crowes catalogue. Robinson noted, "I'm not out to redo the Black Crowes or outdo the Black Crowes or anything like that. I just want to sing the music." The band includes former Crowes Audley Freed and Adam MacDougall and Andy Hess as well as Marcus King and Tony Leone.

Rich Robinson continued his solo career, recording his fourth solo album, Flux, in 2016. In late 2016, he announced the formation of The Magpie Salute which also included former Black Crowes members Marc Ford and Sven Pipien. The band performed original songs, Black Crowes songs, covers, and selections from Robinson and Ford's solo careers. The band released a live album, The Magpie Salute, in 2017, and their debut studio album, High Water I, was released on August 10, 2018. High Water II was released in 2019.

Steve Gorman continued to perform with Trigger Hippy, a band he co-founded in 2009 (which also featured Jackie Greene until late 2015 when he left to focus on his solo career). His memoir of his time in the band, Hard to Handle, was published on September 24, 2019.

Former keyboardist Eddie Harsch died November 4, 2016, at the age of 59.

=== Third reunion: 2019–present ===
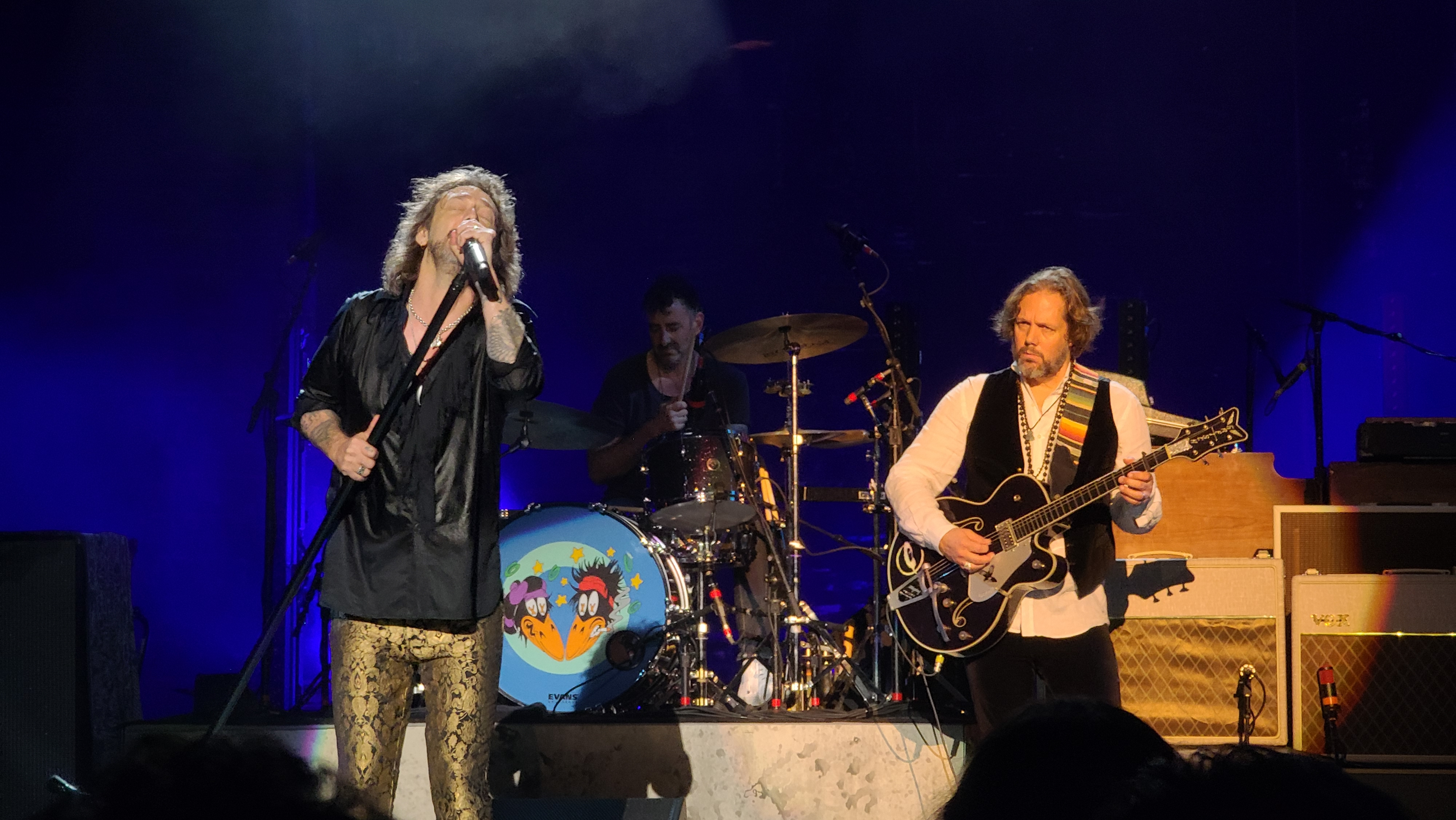
Chris and Rich Robinson of The Black Crowes perform at PNC Bank Arts Center in New Jersey in 2021.

In late 2019, during an interview on The Howard Stern Show, Chris and Rich Robinson announced that they had resolved their differences (the brothers had not spoken in the years since the band's 2015 split) and were planning a 2020 tour to commemorate the 30th anniversary of Shake Your Money Maker.

The reunion was greeted with mixed reaction from fans, as the 46-date tour featured no former band members apart from the brothers and, instead, was to feature an entirely new backing band, including guitarist Isaiah Mitchell (from the bands Earthless and Golden Void), bassist Tim Lefebvre (formerly of the Tedeschi Trucks Band), keyboardist Joel Robinow, and drummer Raj Ojha. This line-up premiered at The Bowery Ballroom in New York City on November 11, 2019, where they played the entire Shake Your Money Maker album. Chris had tested out several of the new members with his As the Crow Flies project.

Ultimately, the tour was disrupted by the COVID-19 pandemic. The dates were eventually rescheduled for summer and fall of 2021. In May 2021, the Crowes announced their rescheduled tour dates and revealed that Sven Pipien would be returning on bass. In June 2021, it was announced that the band had already written at least 20 songs for an upcoming album but had no plans to record them until after the tour. It was also announced that Brian Griffin is the new drummer. He has toured with Brandi Carlile, Richard Marx, Patti Smith and others.

On January 8, 2021, The Black Crowes announced a 30th Anniversary multi-format re-issue of Shake Your Money Maker, releasing a previously unheard track "Charming Mess" in conjunction.

In May 2022, the band released their first newly recorded material since the reunion, 1972, an EP consisting of covers of famous tracks released in 1972.

On March 17, 2023, the band released a double live album on CD and vinyl called Shake Your Money Maker Live, a live album with the first disc being their first album played in its entirety in concert and a second disk consisting of live Black Crowes classics plus a cover of the Rolling Stones', "It's Only Rock 'n Roll (But I Like It)".

The band released the Grammy nominated Happiness Bastards on March 15, 2024. Besides Chris and Rich, the lineup for this release consists of Sven Pipien, Nico Bereciartua, Erik Deutsch and Brian Griffin (who left the band before release).

In 2025, the Black Crowes were nominated for induction into the Rock and Roll Hall of Fame for the first time. The members included in the nomination were Chris Robinson, Steve Gorman, Eddie Harsch, Marc Ford, Johnny Colt, Jeff Cease, and Rich Robinson.

On January 9, 2026, The Black Crowes announced their tenth studio album, titled A Pound of Feathers, along with two tracks from the album available for streaming. The album was released on March 13, 2026.

On February 26, 2026, the band was nominated for the Rock and Roll Hall of Fame for a second time.

== Band members ==
Current members

- Chris Robinson – lead vocals, harmonica, acoustic guitar, percussion (1984–2002, 2005–2015, 2019–present)
- Rich Robinson – guitar, backing vocals (1984–2002, 2005–2015, 2019–present)

Current touring musicians

- Erik Deutsch – keyboards (2022–present)
- Nico Bereciartua – guitars (2023–present)
- Cully Symington – drums (2023–present)
- Mark "Muddy" Dutton – bass, backing vocals (2026–present)
- Mackenzie Adams – backing vocals (2021–present)
- Lesley Grant – backing vocals (2021–present)

== Discography ==
Studio albums

- Shake Your Money Maker (1990)
- The Southern Harmony and Musical Companion (1992)
- Amorica (1994)
- Three Snakes and One Charm (1996)
- By Your Side (1999)
- Lions (2001)
- Warpaint (2008)
- Before the Frost...Until the Freeze (2009)
- Croweology (2010)
- Happiness Bastards (2024)
- A Pound of Feathers (2026)
