= Chris Robinson (singer) =

American musician (born 1966)

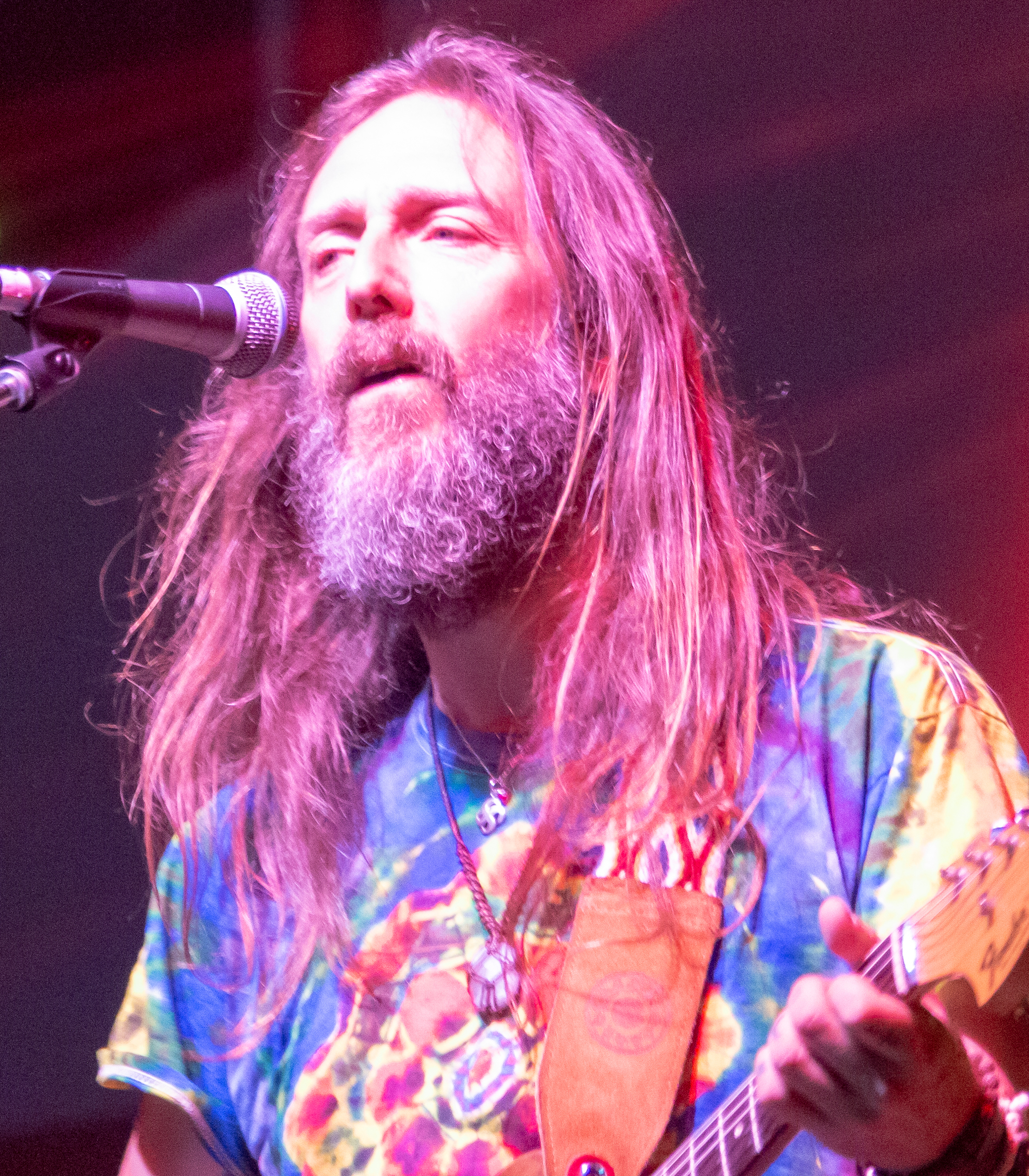
- Robinson in 2018
- Born: Christopher Mark Robinson; December 20, 1966 (age 59); Atlanta, Georgia, U.S.
- Occupations: Singer, guitarist
- Years active: 1984-present
- Spouses: Lala Sloatman (m. 1996; div. 1998); Kate Hudson (m. 2000; div. 2007); Allison Bridges (m. 2009; div. 2018); Camille Johnson (m. 2020)
- Children: 2
- Relatives: Rich Robinson (brother)
- Musical career
- Genre: Rock
- Instruments: Vocals; guitar; harmonica
- Website: ChrisRobinsonBrotherhood.com

Christopher Mark Robinson (born December 20, 1966) is an American musician. He founded the rock band The Black Crowes, then known as Mr. Crowe's Garden, with his brother Rich Robinson in 1984. Chris is the lead singer of The Black Crowes, and he and his brother are the only continuous members of the Crowes. He was the vocalist and rhythm guitarist for the Chris Robinson Brotherhood, which toured and recorded from 2011 through 2019. The band broke up after the death of guitarist, Neal Casal, and the Crowes’ return from hiatus, respectively. Robinson is noted for his high tenor vocal range and bluesy vocal runs.

== Early years ==
Robinson was born in Atlanta, Georgia. He is the son of Nancy Jane (née Bradley) and Stanley "Stan" Robinson, who had a minor Billboard charted record in 1959 called "Boom-A-Dip-Dip" and who died in September 2013. Along with his brother Rich, Robinson formed Mr. Crowe's Garden in the 1980s, having been heavily influenced by The Faces and The Rolling Stones. They played a variety of clubs in and around Atlanta.

Robinson attended Wofford College in Spartanburg, South Carolina. As a teenager, Robinson decorated his dorm room with a Tom Waits poster and a Dream Syndicate poster: "...even at 18, I was into music."

== Career ==
=== The Black Crowes ===
In 1989, Mr. Crowe's Garden changed their name to The Black Crowes. They were signed to Rick Rubin's label Def American and released their debut album Shake Your Money Maker. With the success of their album they went out on tour to support it. They played one date supporting ZZ Top. During this tour Chris was criticized for talking to the audience about his opposition to corporate sponsorship. This led to ZZ Top firing The Black Crowes from the tour.

In May 1991, Chris Robinson spat at or on a female customer at a 7-Eleven convenience store. Robinson was arrested for assault and disturbing the peace, and pleaded no contest six months later.

In the media, Robinson would openly discuss his use of cannabis.

Over the next nine years The Black Crowes went through many lineup changes and released six studio albums. In 1997, The Black Crowes headlined the second Furthur Festival, which had been spawned in the summer of 1996 by the remaining members of the Grateful Dead following Jerry Garcia's death in August 1995. In early 2002, it was announced that drummer Steve Gorman would be leaving the band and that The Black Crowes would be taking a break.

=== Solo career; with New Earth Mud ===
His first solo recording, "The Red Road", appeared on the soundtrack to the 2002 film The Banger Sisters, confirming the singer's turn into softer material. A full-length debut, New Earth Mud, appeared in October and garnered positive critical reviews. Written and produced with Paul Stacey and featuring collaborations with ex-Crowes Marc Ford and Eddie Harsch, the album allowed Robinson to hit the road as a headlining act. The band itself became known as New Earth Mud and earned a reputation for playing lengthy, jam-oriented sets across the United States.

New Earth Mud toured well into 2003, both headlining and sharing the bill with such acts as Elvis Costello, Gov't Mule and The String Cheese Incident. Robinson headed into the studio after the tour concluded, again with Paul Stacey as co-songwriter and producer. The result was This Magnificent Distance, released in June 2004. The album was a bigger commercial success than its predecessor and showcased more of a "full band" sound.

Robinson parted ways with Paul Stacey and the rest of his band in early 2004, the reason for which remains unknown. In a very cryptic post on his official message board, Robinson said farewell to his original line-up and welcomed a new one, which featured ex-Crowes member Audley Freed on guitar and George Reiff on bass. The band toured in support of This Magnificent Distance through the Summer of 2004. Another tour was planned for the fall of 2004 but was abruptly and inexplicably scrapped. Robinson instead remained out of the public eye aside from three appearances with Phil Lesh and Friends at the Warfield Theatre in San Francisco (December 2004).

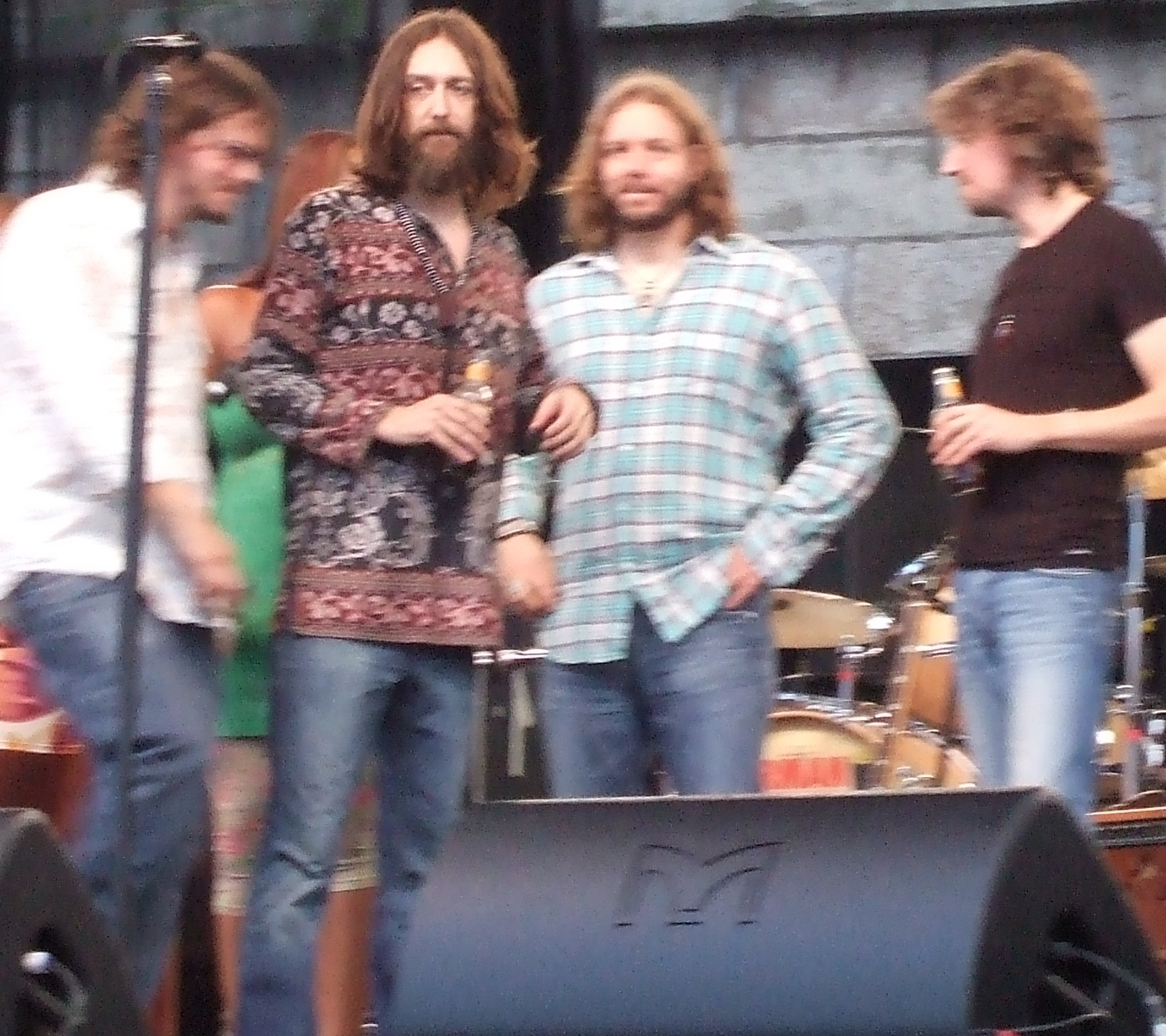
Chris Robinson on stage with Luther Dickinson (left), Rich Robinson, and Adam MacDougall

Robinson did not perform publicly again until his February 2005 performance with his brother Rich at the Consumer Electronics Show in Las Vegas (a private event for people who work in the field of consumer electronics). He then joined Phil Lesh again for the Mardi Gras Spectacular concerts in San Francisco at the end of February, which also featured members of Railroad Earth, Particle and Galactic as well as former members of the Jerry Garcia Band.

New Earth Mud band members

- Chris Robinson – vocals, guitar, harmonica (2002–04)
- Paul Stacey – lead guitar, piano, vocals (2002–04)
- Jeremy Stacey – drums, percussion (2002–04)
- George Reiff – bass, vocals (2002–04)
- George Laks – keyboards, (2002–04)
- Audley Freed – lead guitar (2004)
- Steve DiStanislao – drums, percussion, vocals (2004)
- Rob Barraco – keyboards, vocals (2004)

=== The Black Crowes reunion ===
In early 2005, it was announced that The Black Crowes would be reuniting for a run at New York's Hammerstein Ballroom. This lineup included former members Sven Pipien and Marc Ford. This quickly turned into a full-fledged tour. Although initially not part of the reunion, Steve Gorman did return to the band in early May. In July 2007, during the Black Crowes Summer Tour, the live album Brothers of a Feather: Live at the Roxy was released.

The album was composed of tracks culled from Chris and Rich Robinson's three night set at the Roxy, and featured Black Crowes songs (Horsehead, Cursed Diamond, Thorn In My Pride), solo material from both brothers (Someday Past the Sunset, Forgiven Song), covers from some of their favorite artists (Over the Hill, Roll Um Easy, Driving Wheel, Forever Young), and new material (Magic Rooster Blues, Cold Boy Smile). A new album, Warpaint, was released on March 4, 2008.

On August 31, 2009, the Black Crowes released another album of original material, recorded in front of a live audience over several shows at Levon Helm's barn in New York, Before the Frost...Until the Freeze. Each CD purchase of Before the Frost... was accompanied by a download code to receive the album's companion release, ...Until the Freeze. The vinyl version includes all 20 tracks.

In April 2010, it was announced that in celebration of the band's 20th anniversary, they would release Croweology, featuring new acoustic recordings of Black Crowes' favorites. The two-disc set would be sold at the price of one as a thank you to fans. In conjunction with the release, the band would also embark on the "Say Goodnight to the Bad Guys" tour, which would stretch from August 2010 – December 2010. The majority of the shows saw the band perform two 90 minute sets, the first acoustic, and the second electric. At the end of the tour, it was announced the band would begin a new hiatus of undetermined length.

On January 15, 2015, Rich Robinson announced the final breakup of the band due to a disagreement with his brother Chris Robinson over an alleged proposal regarding ownership of the band. In an interview, drummer Steve Gorman indicated that prior to the breakup, the Black Crowes had been discussing a tour.

On the November 11, 2019 Howard Stern Show Chris and Rich announced that they were reuniting to tour reprising their first studio album, Shake Your Money Maker.

=== Chris Robinson Brotherhood ===
In the fall of 2010, the website for the Chris Robinson Band was launched, fueling speculation that this would be Chris' new project with the advent of the Crowes' hiatus. This was confirmed at the final date of the Say Goodnight to the Bad Guys Tour in San Francisco, when stickers advertising the band and the website were passed out promoting April 2011. Eventually, the project was titled the Chris Robinson Brotherhood (CRB), and a two-month California tour was launched on March 29, 2011, at Soho in Santa Barbara, California and the group toured California heavily. The Chris Robinson Brotherhood lineup includes Adam MacDougall (of the Black Crowes) on keyboards, George Sluppick on drums (George has been replaced by Tony Leone), Mark "Muddy" Dutton (of Burning Tree) on bass, and Neal Casal on guitar. Casal replaced Jonathan Wilson, who was initially announced as a member of the band, but left shortly after.

CRB went into Sunset Studios to record an album in January 2012. Their first album, Big Moon Ritual, was released on June 5, 2012, with the companion album The Magic Door released on September 11, 2012. CRB also released a 7" of "Blue Suede Shoes" b/w a live version "Girl, I Love You" for Record Store Day on April 21, 2012.

=== As the Crow Flies ===
In 2018, Chris Robinson formed the band As the Crow Flies, which performs songs from the Black Crowes catalogue. Robinson said, "I'm not out to redo the Black Crowes or outdo the Black Crowes or anything like that. I just want to sing the music." The band includes former Crowes Audley Freed, Andy Hess and Adam MacDougall, along with Marcus King, and Tony Leone.

=== Production work ===
Although he dabbled in the field earlier, Robinson began consistently producing other artists' albums in the late-2000s. Although few of the albums produced under his guidance were commercial successes, most received considerable critical acclaim.

- Crossing Bridges by The Kinsey Report (Capitol, 1993)
- Very Crystal Speed Machine by Thee Hypnotics (Def American, 1994)
- Vagabonds by Gary Louris (Rykodisc, 2008)
- Acoustic Vagabonds by Gary Louris (Rykodisc, 2008)
- Ready for the Flood by Mark Olson & Gary Louris (Rykodisc, 2009)
- Truth & Salvage Co. by Truth & Salvage Co. (Silver Arrow, 2010)

=== Other appearances ===
Robinson made a cameo appearance (playing an angel) in the final episode of the popular sketch show The Kids in the Hall in 1994. According to The Kids in the Hall Season 5 DVD commentary, Robinson met Kate Hudson at a live The Kids in the Hall performance during their 2000 reunion tour. In 2007, Chris Robinson played Wavy Gravy's birthday party in San Francisco under the name Chris Robinson's Wooden Family. The show was a benefit to support an international development organization called the Seva Foundation founded by Wavy along with Ram Dass.

In 2009, Robinson performed in The People Speak, a documentary feature film that uses dramatic and musical performances of the letters, diaries, and speeches of everyday Americans, based on historian Howard Zinn's A People's History of the United States.

== Personal life ==
On September 8, 1996, he married actress Lala Sloatman, niece (by marriage) of musician Frank Zappa. They were divorced in 1998.

In December 2000, Robinson married actress Kate Hudson. Their son, Ryder was born in January 2004. On August 14, 2006, after nearly six years of marriage, Hudson's publicist announced their separation. On November 17, 2006, Robinson filed divorce papers, citing irreconcilable differences and seeking joint custody of their son. Divorce was granted on October 22, 2007, with Robinson being granted joint custody.

In 2009, Robinson married Allison Bridges. Their daughter was born in December 2009. In 2015 he moved to Marin County, California, where he resided over the next five years. He and Bridges divorced in October 2018.

In January 2020, Robinson married Camille Johnson in Marin County. The couple currently lives in Los Angeles.

Robinson’s paternal grandfather, Isaac “Ike” Rabinowitz, was from a Jewish family that immigrated to the United States from Poland after World War I. The surname of Robinson was naturalized as they came through Ellis Island. His grandmother was Baptist.

Robinson describes himself as a third generation Atlantan. He had dyslexia as a child.

== Discography ==
- New Earth Mud (Redline Records, 2002)
- Bootleg (Promotional Release, 2003)
- This Magnificent Distance (Vector Recordings, 2004)
- Live at Bonnaroo (Live Bonnaroo Records, 2004)
- Brothers of a Feather: Live at the Roxy (Eagle Records, 2007) (Recorded Live at The Roxy Theatre Los Angeles, Ca 2006.)
