= Paul Stacey =

British guitarist and producer (born 1963)

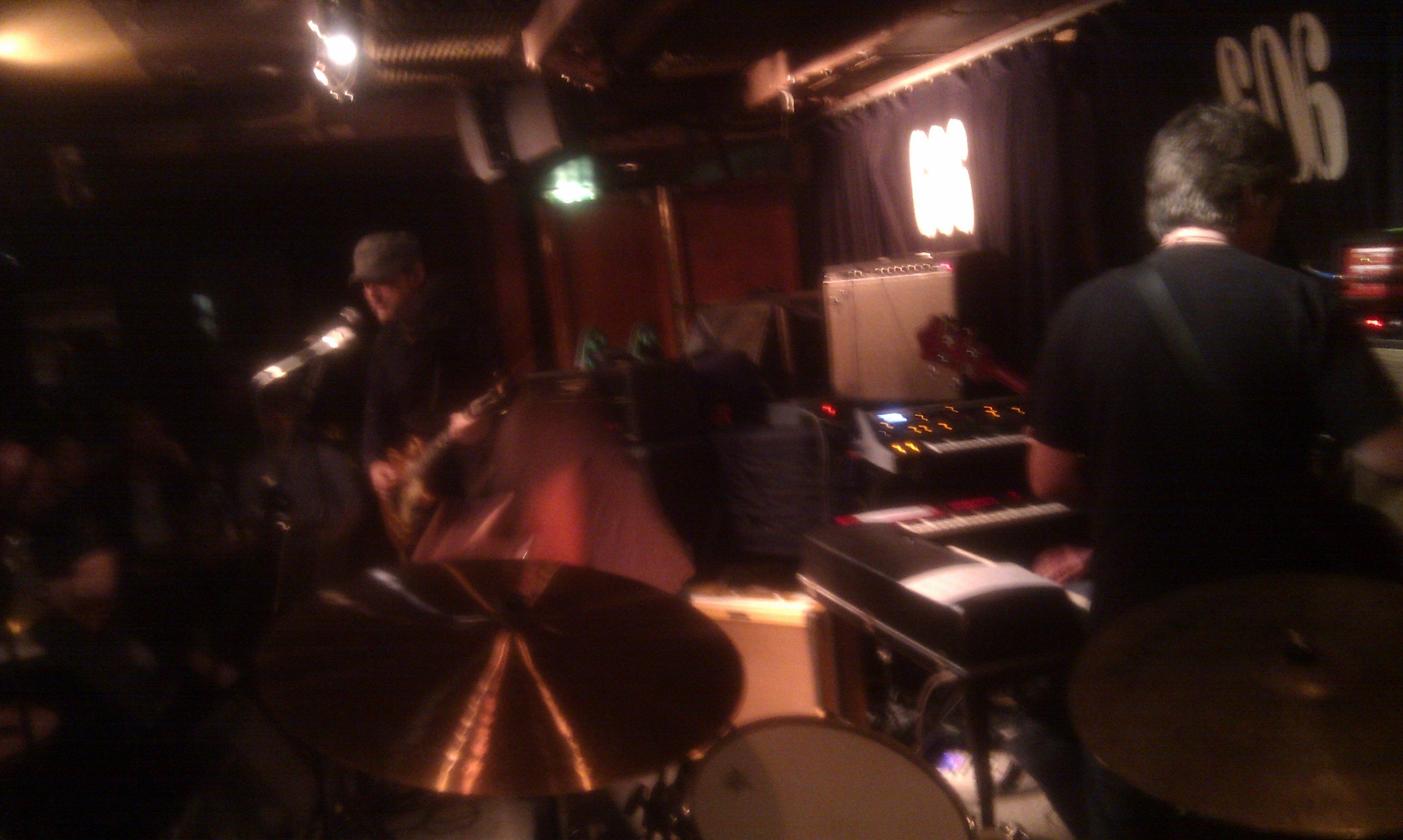
- Stacey (left) with his band in 2011

Background information
- Born: 27 September 1963 (age 62); London, England
- Genres: Rock
- Occupations: Musician; record producer
- Instruments: Guitar; keyboards
- Formerly of: The Black Crowes; Oasis; the Lemon Trees; the Syn

Paul Stacey (born 27 September 1963) is a British guitarist and producer, best known for his work with Oasis, Noel Gallagher's High Flying Birds, Steven Wilson, and the Black Crowes.

== Biography ==
On 29 September 2006, Stacey was named as the replacement for Marc Ford in the Black Crowes, only a day after Ford faxed the band his resignation and two days before the band's fall tour was set to begin. Previous to this announcement Stacey had worked with the Black Crowes by remastering the band's album The Lost Crowes. Stacey toured with the Black Crowes through the end of 2006 and is credited as a co-producer (with the rest of the band) for the Crowes' 2008 release Warpaint.

He has also worked with Chris Robinson (producing and co-writing), the Finn Brothers, Claire Martin (guitar, keys and bass on Take My Heart, 1999), the Syn (guitar, co-writing and co-production on Syndestructible, 2005), Elkie Brooks (on stage and her 1989 album Inspiration), Minuteman (guitar, production and mixing on Resigned to Life, 2002), Black Car and the Kooks (single version of "Eddies Gun", 2005). He has also worked with Lucio Battisti in La Sposa Occidentale (1990) and with Patricia Kaas on her album Je Te Dis Vous (1993), recorded at the Eel Pie Studios in Twickenham. Both Stacey brothers played on Tom Jones' "Praise and Blame tour in November 2010.

In 2011, Stacey was musical director for the play Backbeat at the Duke of York's Theatre, London.

In 2017, he co-produced/engineered Steven Wilson's album To the Bone, also playing a guitar solo on track "Refuge".

=== Work with Oasis (1999–2008) ===
Noel Gallagher has described Stacey as having "an incredible ear for guitar sounds" and called him "an amazing guitarist, as well". Stacey worked for Oasis in a number of different capacities between 1999 and 2008. Originally brought in to engineer Standing on the Shoulder of Giants (2000), he performed a number of other roles as the band suffered line-up issues for the recording of the album, particularly contributing bass guitar work in the absence of the band's bassist Paul McGuigan. Stacey played bass on four songs: "Who Feels Love?", "Gas Panic!", "I Can See a Liar" and "Roll It Over". He also contributed keyboards and lead guitar to "Fuckin' in the Bushes", the guitar solo in "Roll It Over", backwards guitar to "Who Feels Love?" and acoustic guitar to "Where Did It All Go Wrong?". Later, at the end of 2000, he co-produced their first live album/video, Familiar to Millions.

Stacey returned for all subsequent Oasis releases. Two years later, Stacey returned to assist significantly on the band's next release, Heathen Chemistry (2002), engineering and contributing keyboards/hammond organ/mellotron to five tracks: "The Hindu Times", "Force of Nature", "Hung in a Bad Place", "Better Man" and "Little by Little". On the b-side to the "Little By Little"/"She Is Love" double-A single, Stacey provided guitar and backing vocals to the band's studio-live cover of "My Generation" by the Who, making Stacey one of only a handful of musicians to contribute guest vocals to an Oasis track along with Clint Ponderosa and Tony Griffiths.

For 2005's Don't Believe the Truth, he mixed "Mucky Fingers" and contributed piano/mellotron on "Let There Be Love". Stacey also mixed and played piano on "Let There Be Love" b-side "Sittin' Here in Silence (On My Own)" during these sessions. For the recording of Dig Out Your Soul (2008), Stacey was involved in the production, though none of his work was included in the main album. Stacey produced/mixed "The Turning (Alt Version #4)", included on special editions of the album, and "Waiting for the Rapture (Alt Version #2)", included on the special edition and a b-side on Japanese copies of single "I'm Outta Time". Stacey also produced "These Swollen Hand Blues", included as a b-side on the "Falling Down" single.

=== Work with Noel Gallagher's High Flying Birds ===
Stacey was the engineer on Noel Gallagher's High Flying Birds, Gallagher's first post-Oasis album. Stacey played the guitar solo on the final track "Stop the Clocks", which Gallagher described as "the mad fucking Jeff Beck stuff".

=== UK hit singles ===
A number of the Oasis songs Stacey has been involved in have been UK hit singles.

Year	Single	UK Chart Position	Contribution to main track	Contribution to b-sides
2000	"Who Feels Love?"	#4	keyboards, Minimoog, bass, backwards guitar, engineer	Engineer
2002	"The Hindu Times"	#1	Piano, mellotron, engineer	Engineer
2002	"Little By Little"/"She Is Love"	#2	Hammond organ ("Little By Little"), engineer	Backing vocals, guitar ("My Generation"), engineer
2005	"Let There Be Love"	#2	Piano, mellotron	Piano, mixing ("Sittin' Here in Silence (On My Own)")
2009	"Falling Down"	#10	—	Producer ("These Swollen Hand Blues")

Note: "These Swollen Hand Blues" also charted at #190 in the UK as a result of being a popular downloadable track, despite not receiving a proper single release.
