= Burning Tree =

American band

- Origin: Los Angeles, California, United States
- Genres: Blues rock, Hard rock
- Years active: 1987–1991, 2006, 2014, 2016
- Label: Epic Records
- Members: Marc Ford; Mark "Muddy" Dutton; Doni Gray
- Website: Burning Tree's Facebook

Burning Tree was an American hard rock, blues rock power trio from Los Angeles, California, United States. The band performed from the late 1980s to the early 1990s.

Their self-titled debut album was released on Epic Records in 1990, produced by Tim Palmer.

== History ==
In the Southern California/Los Angeles underground rock scene, Marc Ford had started out playing in a series of garage bands from the early to mid-eighties. Gray and Dutton had previously played together in the band, The March.

The band Citadel, which later went by the names Citadel Ltd & Head, was led by the guitarist Marc Ford, drummer Doni Gray and lead vocalist Zane Grey. Their former bandmate Jimmy Ashhurst had left and was replaced by bassist Mark "Muddy" Dutton. Citadel eventually disbanded due to disagreements with their singer, and led to the formation of Burning Tree.

By the late eighties, Citadel Ltd/Head evolved into the blues rock outfit Burning Tree, a power trio featuring Marc Ford on guitar and vocals, Mark "Muddy" Dutton on bass and vocals, and Doni Gray on drums and vocals. In 1987, Burning Tree was formed.

In the earliest version of Burning Tree, all three band members brought in songs and shared vocals, and often switched instruments. Their sound was remembered as being very eclectic and special.

The band secured a residency at the Coconut Teaszer in Hollywood, California, from 1988-89. By the end of 1989, they landed a recording contract with Epic Records.

=== Debut Album: 1990 ===
Burning Tree released their self-titled debut album on Epic Records in 1990, produced by Tim Palmer. Their debut single "Fly On" was released on October 8, 1990.

During the recording session, Booker T. Jones made a guest appearance and played the Hammond B-3, featuring his talents on two songs.

=== Tour: 1990–1991 ===
A commercial failure, but a critical success, Burning Tree allowed the group to tour extensively throughout most of 1990 and 1991. The band struggled to find an audience in the States during the height of "big hair" hard rock music, and instead toured England. During their 1990 tour, Burning Tree opened and supported English bands such as The Damned, The Quireboys, The Dogs D'Amour, and The Riverdogs, as well as, The Black Crowes.

A limited edition live album Live From Leeds was released in 1990, and featured Burning Tree's appearance at The Marquee on April 30, 1990. The five track EP consists of a live recording of the four songs "Burning Tree", "Fly On", "Mistreated Lover", "Same Old Story" and a studio version of "Mistreated Lover". The EP sleeve design resembles The Who's Live at Leeds.

=== Post breakup ===
==== Marc Ford ====
Marc Ford joined The Black Crowes immediately after the breakup from 1992–1997. He has had an extensive solo career and has been involved in a range of collaborations, working with Ben Harper in 2003. The leader of his own bands: Marc Ford & The Neptune Blues Club, Fuzz Machine and Marc Ford & The Sinners. He joined The Magpie Salute from 2016–2019. Ford is currently pursuing a solo career and is a record producer.

==== Mark "Muddy" Dutton ====
Mark "Muddy" Dutton recorded and toured with Gilby Clarke in Col. Parker and with L. A. Guns. He later toured as the bass player in the Chris Robinson Brotherhood. Dutton has formed the group Up The Dose, and is a record producer.

Dutton replaced Sven Pipien as bassist for The Black Crowes in late 2025.

==== Doni Gray ====
Doni Gray recorded an album with Izzy Stradlin and the Ju Ju Hounds. In 2011, Gray joined L.A. Guns.

=== Reunion shows: 2006, 2014, 2016 ===
In 2006, fourteen years after the disbanding of Burning Tree, Ford unexpectedly reunited with his original bandmates. The trio performed three gigs at the King King in Hollywood, California. The band appeared on Ford's solo album Weary and Wired released in 2007, and stayed to promote the album.

A few years later, Burning Tree reunited for a gig at the Whisky a Go Go on December 11, 2014 and again on February 19, 2016.

== Style ==
The band has been compared to The Jimi Hendrix Experience, Cream and Taste.

== Band Members ==
- Marc Ford – guitar, piano and vocals
- Mark "Muddy" Dutton – bass, piano and vocals
- Doni Gray – drums, percussion and vocals

== Discography ==
=== Studio album ===
- Burning Tree (1990)

=== Live album ===
- Live From Leeds (1990)
