= Marc Ford =

American guitarist

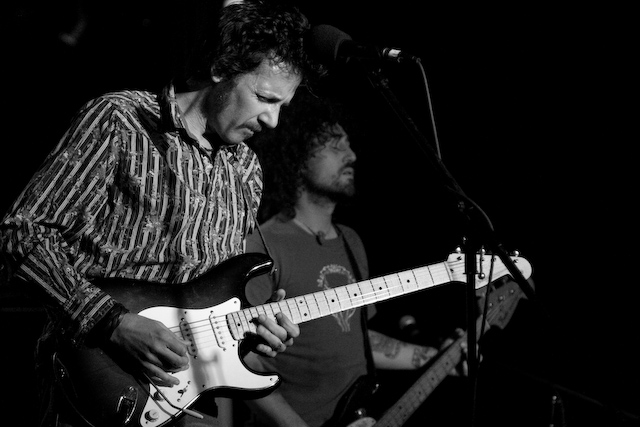
- Marc Ford and Muddy Dutton at the Redstone Room in Davenport, Iowa (July 27, 2007)

Background information
- Born: April 13, 1966 (age 60); Los Angeles, California, United States
- Genres: Blues-rock; hard rock; southern rock; roots rock; jam rock
- Occupations: Musician, singer-songwriter, band leader, record producer
- Instrument: Guitar
- Years active: 1987–present
- Label: Shrapnel Records/Blues Bureau/Naim Label/Provogue
- Website: Marc Ford's official website

Marc Ford (born April 13, 1966) is an American blues-rock guitarist, songwriter and record producer. He is a former guitarist of the rock and roll band The Black Crowes, the former lead guitarist of The Magpie Salute and the leader of his own bands: Burning Tree, Marc Ford & The Neptune Blues Club, Marc Ford & The Sinners, Fuzz Machine, and Jefferson Steelflex.

Ford ranks as a world class musician. He was awarded a Grammy and an NAACP Image Award—an honor bestowed on few Caucasians, for his work with Ben Harper and The Blind Boys of Alabama on There Will Be a Light (2004).

== Early life ==
Marc Ford was born in 1966, in Long Beach, California, United States.

Ford grew up in a non-musical household. He used to listen to his mother's small music collection of old 45s consisting of Chuck Berry and Little Richard. He had early fond memories of the Beatles' music, however, based on where he grew up in Los Angeles, Ford did not have a whole lot of exposure to music and its genres. He described it as being in a "very bland-white-suburb".

At the age of ten, his grandmother bought Ford his first guitar from the Rose Bowl Flea Market/Swap Meet. Ford was taught the acoustic guitar in elementary school, and attended his teacher's music night class for housewives. Originally, Ford played the trumpet in his school's band class. He was dissatisfied with the trumpet, despite being encouraged by his father to pursue it. He came to appreciate learning an instrument, as it first introduced Ford to the world of music, and the effect it can have on a room full of people.

In his early teens, he became influenced by Elton John, Jimi Hendrix, and the 1960s English bands Pink Floyd, and The Jeff Beck Group—in particular the first two albums, which featured guitarists Jeff Beck, Ron Wood, and the vocal talents of Rod Stewart. He delved deeper into Southern roots music, and his love and appreciation for it still upholds to this day.

=== Career beginnings ===
Marc Ford started out playing the Southern California/Los Angeles underground punk rock scene in the early to mid-eighties in garage bands such as Citadel, which later went by the names Citadel Ltd & Head. Formed by Ford's acquaintances in high school, Citadel eventually disbanded due to disagreements with their singer, which led to the formation of Burning Tree. Ford and his high school bandmates were influenced and lived vicariously through the rockumentary films: The Who's The Kids Are Alright (1979), and Jimi Hendrix (1973). Ford graduated from high school in 1984, and left to pursue a career in music in Hollywood, Los Angeles by 1986.

==== Appearances ====
- Stronzo – He played in the Los Angeles side-project band Stronzo which featured Mickey Finn of Jetboy, Sami Yaffa of Hanoi Rocks/Jetboy, and various other musicians playing shows outside of their main bands.
- In 1988, Ford played guitar for Michael Monroe at the Scream Club, also with Sami Yaffa on bass, which was the first ever L.A. show for the former Hanoi Rocks singer.
- He played with early Dogs D'Amour/L.A. Guns man Robert Stoddard.

== Career ==
=== 1983–1984: Cathedral of Tears ===
In 1984, eighteen-year-old Ford played in the post-T.S.O.L. band Cathedral of Tears, led by Jack Grisham and Greg Kuehn. He played guitar on the self-titled 1984 EP on which he was credited as "Mark Ford". In 2019, 1983 Demo EP was released, based on the band's previously unreleased demos from 1983. Ford was not involved.

=== 1988: The Scarecrows ===
Ford was briefly in the Orange County band The Scarecrows. Throughout the eighties, the members of Burning Tree and The Scarecrows had been fitting in and out each other's bands for several years. When Ford launched Burning Tree with drummer Doni Gray and bassist Mark "Muddy" Dutton, Ford had played an integral role in revival of the Scarecrows, which came back in early 1988 after a year's absence. Ford contributed to the Scarecrows demo recordings and played in many of the band's live shows.

The album The Scarecrows featuring Marc Ford was released in 2006, based on the band's 1988 recordings.

=== 1987–1991: Burning Tree ===
In the late eighties, Citadel Ltd/Head evolved into the blues-rock outfit Burning Tree, a power trio featuring Ford on guitar and vocals, Mark "Muddy" Dutton on bass and vocals, and Doni Gray on drums and vocals. Burning Tree released their self-titled debut album on Epic Records in 1990, produced by Tim Palmer. On the album, Booker T. Jones made an appearance and played the Hammond B-3, featuring on two songs. Although the band was known for sharing vocal roles, Ford sung lead on the following tracks: "Burning Tree", "Fly On", "Mistreated Lover", "Playing With The Wind", "Last Laugh", and "Baby Blue". Ford was reluctant to sing at first, but Stevie Ray Vaughan inspired him after watching him perform at the Greek Theatre. Ford's wife (then girlfriend) Kirsten Konte also sang backing vocals on the album.

A commercial failure, but a critical success, Burning Tree allowed the group to tour extensively throughout most of 1990 and 1991. The band struggled to find an audience in the States during the height of "big hair" hard rock music, and instead toured England. During their 1990 tour, Burning Tree opened and supported English bands such as The Damned, The Quireboys, The Dogs D'Amour, and The Riverdogs.

Overcome with frustration and stagnation in the industry, the band's career was cut short when Ford left to join the Black Crowes in 1992, for whom Burning Tree had opened for on their first (and only) tour.

In 2006, fourteen years after the disbanding of Burning Tree, Ford unexpectedly reunited with his original bandmates. The trio performed three gigs at the King King in Hollywood, California. A few years later, Burning Tree reunited for a gig at the Whisky a Go Go on December 11, 2014 and again on February 19, 2016.

=== 1992–1997: The Black Crowes ===
Before knowing of The Black Crowes, Marc Ford was given a promotional copy of Shake Your Money Maker by a friend who worked at a record store. He first listened to the album while out driving with his wife and he pulled the car over, even before getting on the freeway, in utter disbelief. Ford was overcome with a burning passion for their sound. "Listen to that dude sing! He sings like I play the guitar. I'm going to play with that dude someday." Ford quickly became friends with Chris Robinson and the rest of the Crowes. In mid-1991, Ford sat in a couple of times with the Black Crowes in concert, performing The Allman Brothers Band's classic hit, "Dreams".

When the Black Crowes severed their relationship with their original guitarist Jeff Cease, Ford was asked to fill the vacancy. He accepted the offer, but a few days later he was asked by Slash to join Guns N' Roses, after the departure of rhythm guitarist Izzy Stradlin from the band. Ford refused. At the time, Guns N' Roses were in the middle of a huge stadium world tour. Ford later said in 2017, that he would probably be dead now, had he joined them. However, in 1992, Ford was involved in the recording of Izzy Stradlin's solo debut Izzy Stradlin and the Ju Ju Hounds where he was featured alongside the talents of Ron Wood and Ian McLagan of the Faces.

Marc Ford stepped into the Crowes' lineup as their newest guitarist to record their 1992 sophomore album, The Southern Harmony and Musical Companion. The album reached Number 1 on the Billboard charts and earned a double platinum certificate for sales. On the album, which sold more than a million copies, Ford's main task was lead guitar and playing solos, while Rich Robinson provided rhythm guitar on his own compositions.

In late 1992, Ford said that the band's two guitarists had developed a partnership that allowed for a greater interplay. "When I joined the band, I said to Rich [Robinson], 'I really want to make the two-guitar thing work together,' instead of dividing the labor into traditional rhythm and lead roles. (Ford had been the lone guitarist in Burning Tree's power-trio format). It has developed musically, and the band sounds totally different than it did when we recorded the record. We've got a ton of new songs that we've been coming up with at sound checks...we just start jamming on things." Some new parts were unplanned and improvised during their concerts, for example the opening jam of "Thorn In My Pride". Their guitarist dynamic and musicianship resembles the likes of Neil Young and Stephen Stills.

Ford performed on the next two Black Crowes releases, Amorica (1994) and Three Snakes and One Charm (1996), and is also credited for tracks from the band's two unreleased albums (1993's Tall and 1997's Band, later released together as The Lost Crowes). His addition to the Black Crowes sound, which consisted primarily of slide guitar and southern twang, helped define the band at the time. It was during his time in the band, that Ford learnt how to play slide guitar. Ford's ability to adapt to core songwriter Rich Robinson's music and crunchy rhythm guitar sound solidified him and Robinson as the preeminent guitar duo of the 1990s.

During his time in the Black Crowes, Ford also played slide guitar on British band Thee Hypnotics' 1994 album The Very Crystal Speed Machine, produced by Chris Robinson.

Ford had a realization "light bulb" moment while the Crowes were on tour, opening for The Rolling Stones during the 1995 Voodoo Lounge Tour. "I've reached the top of the mountain. Wrong mountain, dude!". Ford became disillusioned with the rock star dream while watching Keith Richards and Ron Wood behave like 12-year-olds in Wood's hotel suite after a show in Montpellier in 1995.

The intensity of the Black Crowes, their four long years of nonstop touring and substance abuse, affected Ford's performance immensely. He was dismissed from the Black Crowes in August 1997, following the band's stint on the summer-long Furthur Festival tour. Black Crowes leaders Chris and Rich Robinson cited Ford's excessive Heroin and drug use as the reason for his firing. The guitarist entered a rehab facility soon after his dismissal. In 2000, Chris Robinson said that he "will always be happy knowing that Marc Ford didn't die while he was in the Black Crowes," and added that Ford was doing well and making music with friends in Los Angeles.

In 2016, Marc Ford reflected on his time in the Crowes. "It was an incredibly harrowing time for young adults to go through...and not ever being able to be prepared for the muchness of it all, the good and bad. If you don't have your own sort of limiters and impulse control, no one ever tells you no. It was a beautiful time. I don't know if I would walk through that again. It's just a bizarre place to be. I would do it differently now, knowing what I know now. I know why it kills so many people."

=== 1998–2003: Solo and collaborations ===
After his departure from the Black Crowes, Ford formed Marc Ford and the Uninvited. In addition to Ford, the band featured drummer Mike Stinson, guitarist Eric Solton, keyboardist Ed Lyon, and bassist Brian Lerman. In 1998, he sat in numerous times with Gov't Mule before joining the Chris Stills Band for a summer tour. Upon the conclusion of that tour, Ford quit the Chris Stills Band.

=== 1999: Federale ===
The band, Federale was a joint venture between himself and Luther Russell (who were eventually joined by drummer Jimi Bott and bassist Freddy Trujillo). The band gained attention from major label Interscope Records. Federale toured briefly, opening for acts like Gov't Mule, but disbanded after Interscope Records was bought out by Universal Music Group. The song "Smoke Signals" was written by Russell and Ford together, and featured on Ford's 2007 second solo album, Weary and Wired.

=== 2000–2001: Blue Floyd ===
During 2000, Ford joined the Pink Floyd/blues jam/tribute band Blue Floyd, which originally featured bass guitarist Allen Woody, drummer Matt Abts, keyboardist Johnny Neel, and bassist Berry Oakley Jr.. At one particular show, the band had looped the 1939 film The Wizard of Oz behind them on a screen and synced it up to their interpreted set of The Dark Side of the Moon. "The people that were there said it was unbelievable, like some of the musical sections went with the scenes of the movie, and as we ended I saw that the credits had finished rolling." Ford has credited David Gilmour as a major influence from his youth and wished Gilmour could have made a guest appearance alongside Blue Floyd. At a festival in Copenhagen, Blue Floyd played with Steve Cropper. Ford left Blue Floyd at the close of 2001, opting to again to go solo.

=== 2002: Chris Robinson ===
In January 2002, Malibu, California, Ford performed a set with Chris Robinson, the first time Ford and Robinson had performed with one another since Ford's dismissal from the Black Crowes nearly five years prior. Robinson again joined Ford at the Malibu Inn two weeks later, confirming that they had made amends. Ford co-wrote "Sunday Sound", a track featured on Robinson's solo debut, New Earth Mud.

=== 2002–2003: Marc Ford & The Sinners ===
Following his acoustic-based stint at the Malibu Inn, Ford decided to form a full-fledged electric band. Featuring fellow Blue Floyd member bassist Berry Oakley Jr. and newcomers, drummer Gootch and keyboardist Chris Joyner, Marc Ford and The Sinners hit the road for a tour in early 2002.

==== It's About Time (2002) ====
Ford's debut album, entitled It's About Time, was released on Anko Records in the fall of 2002. During his band's 2002 tour, Ford often took time out (with and without The Sinners) to record tracks for his debut album.

In 2003, Marc Ford and The Sinners had an opening slot on Lucinda Williams' ongoing tour.

=== 2003–2006: Ben Harper ===
In late 2003, Ford accepted an invitation to join Ben Harper and the Innocent Criminals, relegating The Sinners to an indefinite hiatus. Ford toured with Ben Harper and the Innocent Criminals for the majority of 2003, from which their live EP Live at the Hollywood Bowl was drawn.

Marc Ford continued his association with Ben Harper and his band through the close of 2004, featuring on Harper's collaboration with The Blind Boys of Alabama, the Grammy award-winning album There Will Be a Light. Ford eventually won an NAACP award for this record—an honor bestowed on few Caucasians.

During this time, he was called on to re-join the Black Crowes for their All Join Hands reunion tour. In 2006, while still an active member of the Black Crowes, Ford never severed his ties with Ben Harper. He appears on Harper's 2006 album Both Sides of the Gun and performs at a handful of Harper's shows in support.

=== 2005–2006: Black Crowes reunion ===
After a three-year hiatus, the Robinson brothers reformed their band, the Black Crowes in early 2005 for a series of gigs and (later) a new album. In March 2005, it was announced that Marc Ford would be returning to play on lead guitar.

Ford toured with the Black Crowes on the All Join Hands Tour, through to the summer of 2006. Despite some new songs being debuted during live performances, no new studio material was released. During this time, the Black Crowes released The Lost Crowes complication album, containing the archived and previously unreleased studio albums Tall (1993) and Band (1997). Ford also stars in the Freak 'n' Roll...Into the Fog reunion tour DVD and CD with the Black Crowes, showcasing their live performance at The Fillmore in August 2005.

On September 5, 2006, two days before he was due to hit the road for the fall leg of the ongoing Black Crowes reunion tour, Ford's lawyer notified the Black Crowes management via fax that, effective immediately, the guitarist would no longer be a member of the band. The following day, Ford put out a press release announcing that he had left the Crowes to protect his hard-fought sobriety, and that he had recently produced albums for emerging artists, PawnShop Kings' Locksley and Ryan Bingham's Mescalito.

Ford confirmed in a 2007 interview, Hittin' the Note magazine, that he is contractually prohibited from discussing his time in the Black Crowes during the period of 2005–2006. In a later 2007 interview with James Calemine, Ford revealed that this contractual limitation was "in perpetuity." This prevents Ford from discussing or ever writing a book on his time spent in the band. In the same interview, Ford confessed that he "had a great time. It was a good atmosphere and I was enjoying playing again with them. Things change. I can talk about my own experience, but I can't tell stories about what anyone else did or the business side of things."

=== 2006–2016: Solo again ===
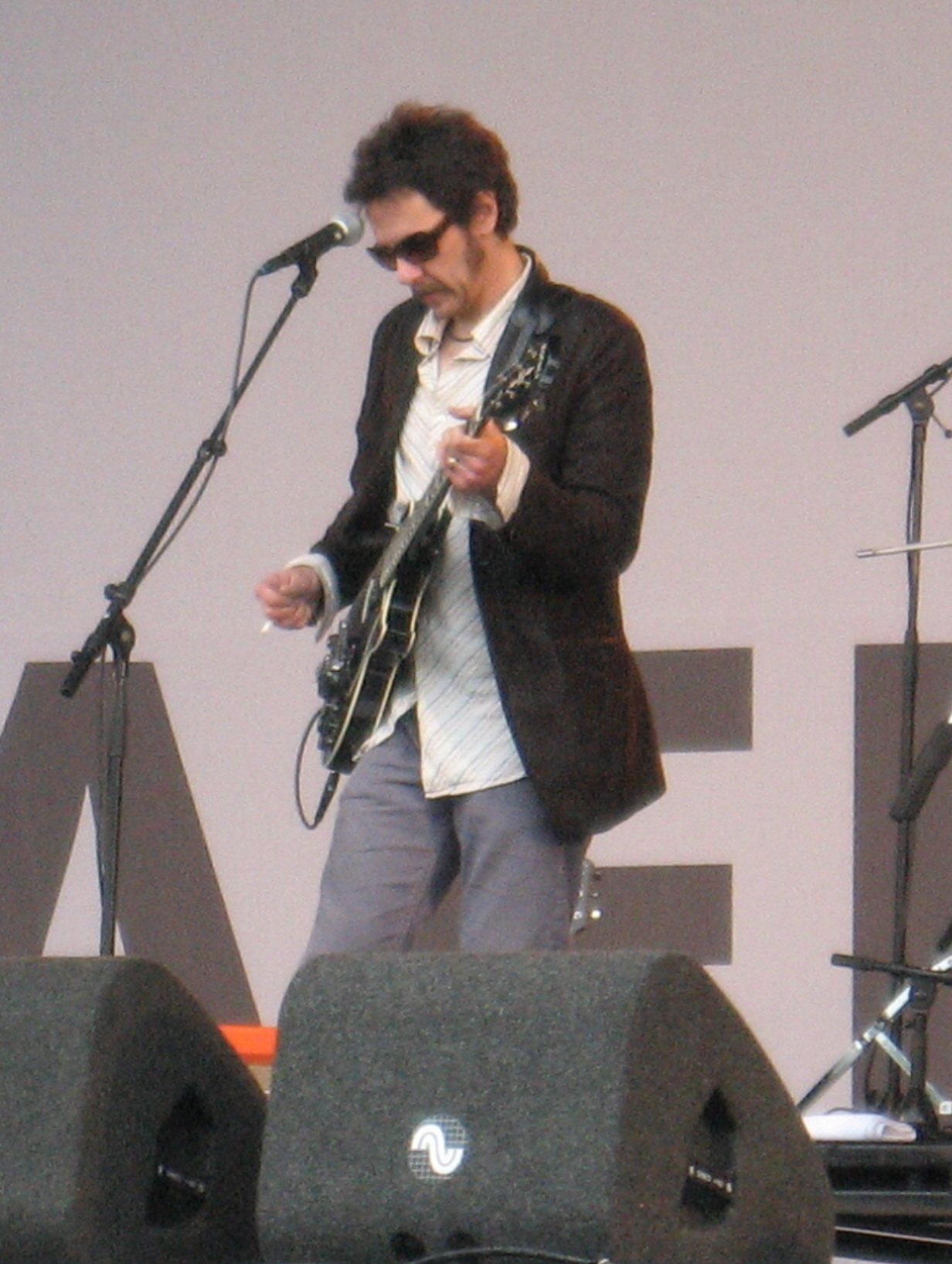
Marc Ford at Parkpop 2007, Netherlands June 24, 2007

Shortly after his sudden departure from the Black Crowes, Marc Ford unexpectedly reunited with his original Burning Tree bandmates. The trio performed three gigs at the King King in Hollywood, California. Following these impromptu dates, Ford decided to recruit his old bandmates Doni Gray and Mark "Muddy" Dutton, along with his son Elijah Ford, to be the line-up for his new recording band as Ford had already begun preproduction on his new studio album.

==== Weary and Wired (2007) ====
Ford's second solo album Weary and Wired was released on March 13, 2007, on Shrapnel Records' subdivision Blues Bureau International. Coinciding with the album release, was Ford's feature interview on the cover of jam-band oriented music magazine Hittin' the Note (Issue #52).

=== 2007, 2010: Marc Ford & the Fuzz Machine ===
Throughout 2007, Ford hit the road in support of his new album, with bandmates Mark "Muddy" Dutton, Elijah Ford, and their new drummer Dennis Morehouse. The tour found the band performing across the United States, as well as selected dates in Spain, Germany, Russia and at a handful of European festivals. During the later dates on the tour, Ford unveiled as many as six new songs, hinting at another album release. The tour continued through to the end of 2007, and Ford took a short break.

==== Fuzz Machine (2010, 2020) ====
In February 2010, Ford self-released his fourth studio album, Fuzz Machine, featuring material recorded while on a touring break in the fall of 2007 with the band of the same name. The album's release coincided with Ford's mini-tour of Spain, on which he used the Steepwater Band as his backing band. The tour prompted the launch of a new website for Ford on Bandcamp, the central theme of which is based around the Fuzz Machine recording. The album was exclusively available at all of Ford's performances on the mini-tour, followed by online distribution in November 2010. This album was rereleased in 2020.

=== 2008–2015: Producer and collaborations ===
Early in 2008, Ford played sporadic shows on the West Coast, some with his Fuzz Machine band and some with his new venture, Jefferson Steelflex.

Ford and his son Elijah joined Ryan Bingham for several dates on his 2008 tour, performing songs from the Ford-produced album Mescalito. Ford played slide guitar on Bingham's appearances on The Tonight Show and Late Night with Conan O'Brien in the summer of 2008. Ford also produced Bingham's second album, Roadhouse Sun in 2009.

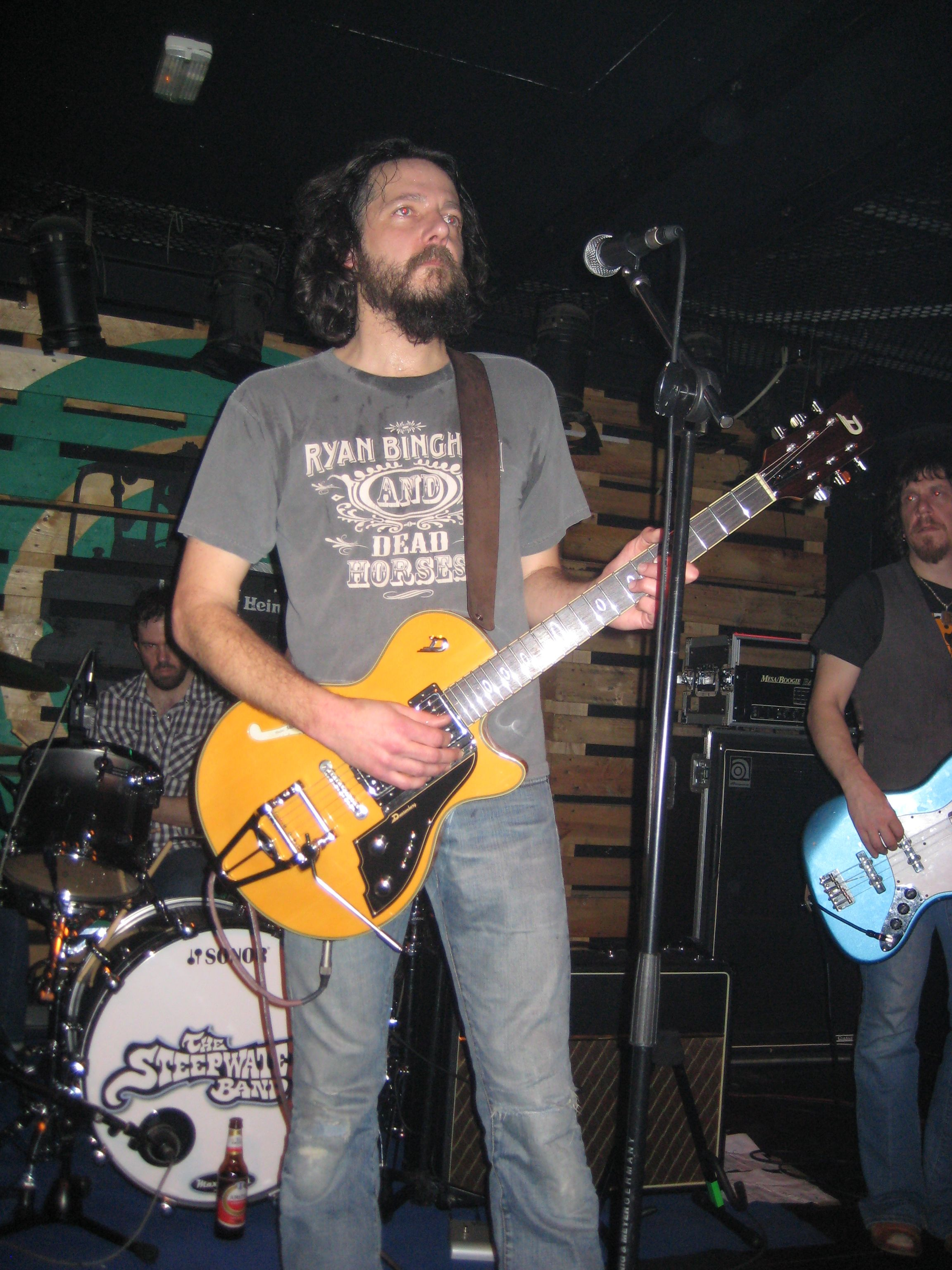
Marc Ford with The Steepwater Band, Feb 28, 2010

Ford produced Steepwater Band's next studio effort, an LP tentatively titled Grace & Melody released in November 2008, at Compound Studios in Signal Hill, California (recording began in the first week of May 2008). Ford first met the Chicago-based power trio when their bands shared a festival bill in Bilbao, Spain (in the summer of 2007). Ford joined the band on stage to jam on a pair of songs including a cover of Neil Young's "Cortez the Killer", following a sit-in by his bandmate/son Elijah. Steepwater Band subsequently provided support for Ford's headlining gig at the Double Door in Chicago on July 26, 2007; this time Jeff Massey and Tod Bowers (of Steepwater Band) joined Ford's band for their encore. Soon after, Ford approached the trio about producing their next effort.

During the latter part of 2008, Ford took up playing lead guitar at the Vineyard Community Church in Laguna Niguel, California. Via that gig, he produced and contributed guitar work to Vineyard Music artist Chris Lizotte's album Signal Hill Revival, released in early 2009. Ford's association with both the church and Lizotte continues to the present day.

In May 2009, it was revealed that Ford would be joining the touring band for blues artist Booker T. Jones (of Booker T. & the MG's fame). Ford was confirmed as the guitarist for June through September 2009.

In the fall of 2009, Ford launched a download site to showcase and facilitate the sale of his archive of soundboard recordings from his solo work. The shows released thus far focus entirely on the Neptune Blues Club. It is unclear if the site will cover other eras of Ford's solo career.

==== Holy Ghost (2014) ====
After producing Phantom Limb's The Pines album, Ford asked the band to return the favor by backing his own solo project. Ford signed with the Naim record label in the UK and released his fifth solo album, Holy Ghost on April 14, 2014. He announced the new album in Country Music magazine. Ford released a video coinciding with the release on the story behind the new album.

In 2015, Ford played on his friend, singer songwriter Craig Helmreich's album Blood On the Table, (under the artist name of It's Just Craig's) which was recorded with producer John Vanderslice at Tiny Telephone Studios in San Francisco.

=== 2008–2009, 2016–2017: Marc Ford & the Neptune Blues Club ===
==== Marc Ford and the Neptune Blues Club (2008) ====
In early August 2008, it was announced (via his record label) that Ford's third studio album would be made available online and in stores on September 23, 2008. Entitled Marc Ford and the Neptune Blues Club, the album featured entirely new material performed by the newest incarnation of Ford's band at the time, the Neptune Blues Club — himself on guitar and vocals, Mike Malone on keyboard and vocals, Anthony Arvizu on drums, Bill Barrett on harmonica, and John Bazz on upright bass. This version of his band is a slight reconfiguration of the Jefferson Steelflex band, which had performed earlier in 2008, prior to Ford's short stint with Ryan Bingham.

In early 2009, it was rumored that the Neptune Blues Club was working on its second album at Compound Studios. However, Ford's deal with Shrapnel Records' subsidiary Blues Bureau International had expired after 2008's Neptune Blues Club, and by mid-2009 it seemed that the Neptune Blues Club had expired with it. One sole track from the sessions, "Shalimar Dreams", was released via online distributor BandCamp.com; it remained as the only material released from the second album sessions to date.

==== The Vulture (2016) ====
In early 2016, Ford reunited with the Neptune Blues Club. He returned to Tiny Telephone Studio, located in the Mission District of San Francisco, to record his sixth solo album, The Vulture, released on October 14, 2016. Produced by John Vanderslice, the album's opening track cowritten by Dan Moore, "Devil's In the Details" emerges as one of Ford's finest.

The making of The Vulture appears in the brief The State of Music Series' Marc Ford Documentary.

On November 18, 2016, Marc Ford and the Neptune Blues Club was joined by Rich Robinson at the Basement in Nashville. Robinson appeared alongside the band for two songs: "Shalimar Dreams" and a neat cover version of "Loan Me A Dime".

In 2017, Marc Ford and the Neptune Blues Club made a guest appearance on Jam In The Van in Los Angeles, California. They performed three songs from The Vulture, "Old Lady Sunrise", "Shalimar Dreams", and "The Ghetto Is Everywhere". In this incarnation of the band, their drummer Anthony Arvizu was replaced by Phil Jones.

=== 2016–2019: The Magpie Salute ===
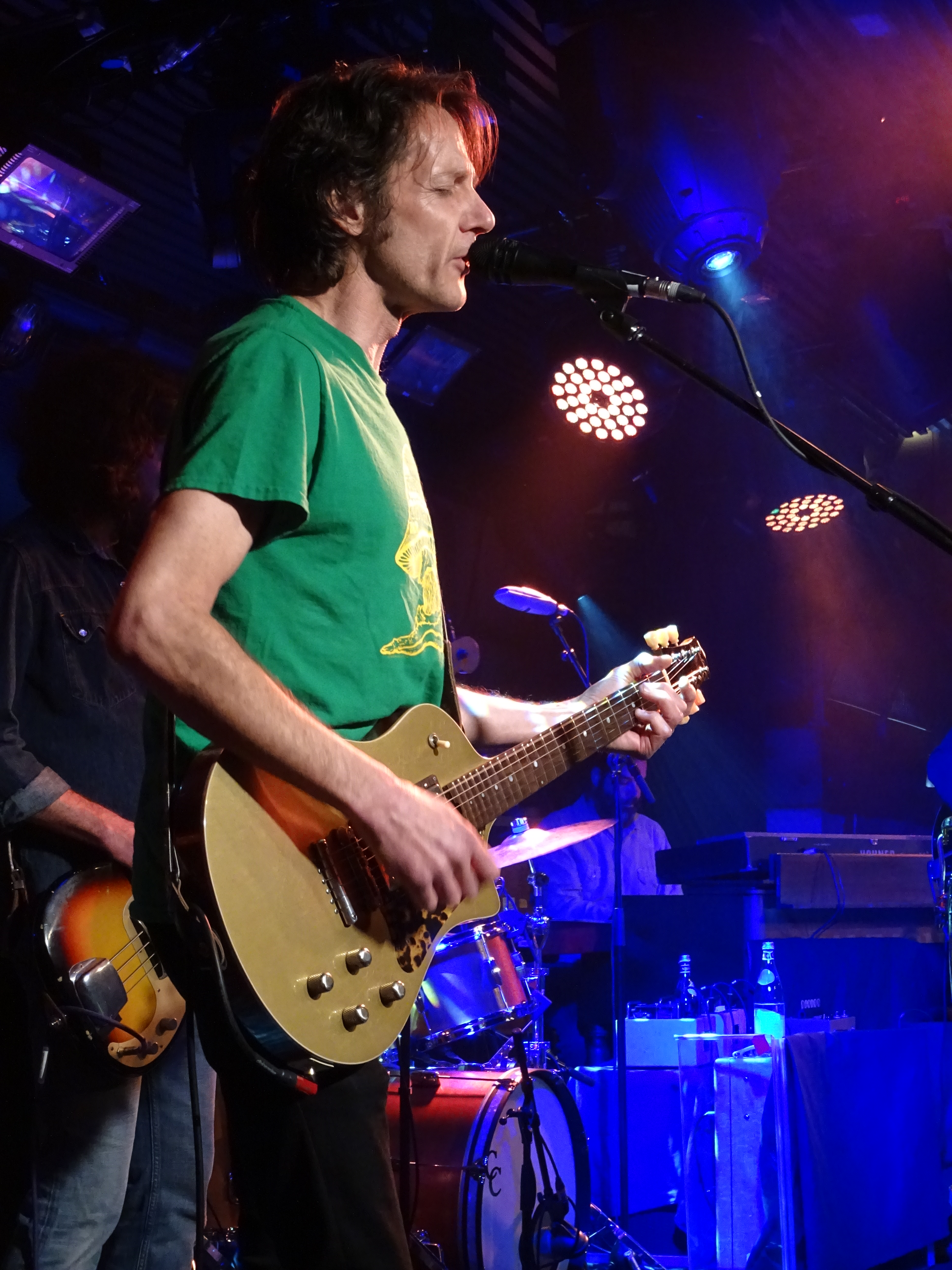
Marc Ford live with the Magpie Salute at Under the Bridge London April 14, 2017

In October 2016, it was announced that Marc Ford had joined the newly formed The Magpie Salute, led by his former Black Crowes bandmate Rich Robinson. Months prior to forming the band, Rich Robinson had invited Ford to play on the Woodstock Sessions (Vol.3) after getting reacquainted with Ford through Rich's guitarist at the time, and gave Ford back his guitars from his Crowes' days. The Woodstock Sessions, a three-day event of shows held in Woodstock, New York from August 19–21, 2016. It was during these sessions, that Ford was reunited with other members from the Black Crowes, bassist Sven Pipien and the late keyboardist Eddie Harsch, who passed a few months later in November 2016, just shy of the Magpie's formation.

The Magpie Salute was fronted by guitarist Rich Robinson, accompanied by Marc Ford and bassist Sven Pipien, with John Hogg as lead vocalist. The band as well had keyboardist Matt Slocum, drummer Joe Magistro, and backing vocalists Adrien Reju and Katrine Ottosen from Robinson's solo band.

The band first released a self-titled live album, The Magpie Salute (Live), featuring performances from throughout 2017.

August 10, 2018: The Magpie Salute's debut studio album, High Water I, was released on Eagle Rock (North America), Mascot Label Group (Europe, Australia, New Zealand) and Sony (Japan).

September 6, 2019: The Magpie Salute – High Water II was released (Eagle Rock Entertainment 2019)

On November 11, 2019, it was announced that Rich and Chris Robinson reformed the Black Crowes with all new band members and The Magpie Salute went on "hiatus". In 2022, on the topic of reforming the Black Crowes, Rich Robinson confessed to the decline of The Magpie Salute. "Some dynamics are really good and some dynamics can be really toxic. And with Steve [Gorman] in particular, but also Marc Ford going back to his old ways, so to speak which was the reason why I just put an end to Magpie, because I'm, like, 'Look, I'm not doing this again,' with going down that road."

=== 2019–present: Solo and next chapter ===
In 2019, Ford released a single "St. James Infirmary" b/w "Backwater Blues" with Need To Know Music / Shunkworks.

In January 2020, a west coast tour with Marc Ford opening for The Allman Betts Band, and a west coast solo headline tour were announced. On March 8, 2020, The Allman Betts Band performed at the Palace Theatre in Los Angeles which was highlighted by a series of exciting sit-ins. Ford joined The Doors' Robby Krieger and the ABB to play "Trouble No More" and "Roadhouse Blues".

The ABB tour was soon cancelled on March 12, 2020, after only two shows, due to the arrival of the COVID-19 pandemic. And a few weeks later, Ford's 2020 headline tour was also cancelled for the same reason. The following year, on September 29, 2021, the ABB tour resumed with Marc Ford as their opening band, with Phil Jones on drums and Berry Oakley's son Berry Duane Oakley Jr. on bass. In 2022, Ford was a special guest on the west coast shows of the sixth Allman Family Revival tour.

==== Live in Germany (2021) ====
Marc Ford's Live In Germany was self-released, on January 15, 2021. The solo live album consists of a recording made from the May 16th 2017 show at the Music Star in Norderstedt, Germany. At the time, Ford was unaware that his live set was being recorded by the now discontinued venue. On receiving the tape, the 2017 show's recording became an unexpected album. Personally mixed by Ford himself, it was completed and released during the height of the COVID-19 pandemic.

==== Neil Songs (2023) ====
Marc Ford and Phil Jones (former drummer for Tom Petty) self-released a cover EP entitled Neil Songs, on January 16, 2023. Recorded at Jones' Robust Recordings, the album contains songs written by Neil Young. Ford selected six electric tunes to record: "Lookout Joe" (Tonight's The Night), "L.A" (Time Fades Away), "Southern Man" (After the Gold Rush), "Don't Cry No Tears" (Zuma), "Barstool Blues" (Zuma) and "Albuquerque" (Tonight's The Night).

After a few warm-up gigs with Phil Jones (drums) and Jim Wilson (bass/background vocals) in Los Angeles, California, Marc Ford kicked-off his 6 show east coast tour in Lowell, Massachusetts on June 10, 2023. On this east coast tour, Ford performed with Phil Jones (drums), and Berry Oakley JR (bass and backing vocals). Traveling as a trio, Ford's band resembles the shadow of his Burning Tree days, performing songs from throughout his solo career.

On August 17, 2023, Ford performed with The Steepwater Band at Fizgeralds Nightclub in Berwyn, Illinois. They did a rendition of Neil Young's "Down By The River".

On November 18, 2023, he performed with Cindy Cashdollar and did a rendition of Young's "Helpless" for The Last Waltz at Massey Hall. The band Chest Fever was celebrating 55 Years of The Band. Ford has previously played with Chest Fever, where he performed Muddy Water's "Mannish Boy" with Isaiah Mitchell (The Last Waltz live at the Belly Up 2021), and again in March 2023.

In 2024, Ford is on the Marc Ford Tour, touring around the States with Phil Jones (drums) and Jim Wilson (bass).

=== Benefit shows for Patch Outreach and the AMA ===
May 18, 2018: Marc Ford played his first full solo acoustic show at the Thunder Road Club in Somerville, Massachusetts. This was the first benefit show to raise money for Patch Outreach (Pepperell MA food pantry) and the Ayer Masonic Association. An unreleased "The Magpie Salute" song, "Lost Boy", was played for the first time (as the encore). "Lost Boy" was released in October 2019, on The Magpie Salute's High Water II LP/CD.

November 2, 2019: The Marc Ford Band (Marc Ford/Elijah Ford/Phil Jones) performed at the second annual benefit concert for Patch Outreach and the Ayer Masonic Association at a private venue in Georgetown, Massachusetts.

On February 19, 2022: After a hiatus due to covid, the third benefit concert for Patch Outreach (Massachusetts based food pantry) and the Ayer Masonic Association occurred at The Stone Church Music Club in New Market, New Hampshire. Playing bass for Marc's band was Berry Duane Oakley of the Allman Betts Band with Phil Jones playing drums. For the first time ever, Alan Forbes created an event poster for a Marc Ford concert.

June 10, 2023: The Marc Ford Band played the fourth benefit concert for Patch Outreach featuring Marc Ford, Berry Duane Oakley Jr. (bass) and Phil Jones (drums). The event was moved to a new music club in lowell MA - Taffeta Music hall.

May 18, 2024: The Marc Ford Band played the 5th benefit concert for Patch Outreach featuring Marc Ford, Jim Wilson (bass) and Phil Jones (drums). Once again - the venue was Taffeta Music Hall in Lowell MA. The Steepwater Band opened the show.

== Personal life ==
Ford and wife Kirsten Konte have one son, Elijah Ford, born in 1989. The family relocated from Los Angeles, California to Austin, Texas.

== Guitars ==
Marc Ford designed his Signature Guitar Model with Bill Asher. The guitar was designed with the intention to seamlessly incorporate the tone and vibe of Ford's Les Paul Special with the comforts and playability of his go-to Stratocaster.

Since late 2016, Ford has toured with a personal preference for the Electro Sonic "Gold Top". The guitar, also designed by Bill Asher, has now become associated with Ford and his sound. On occasion, Ford loves telling the story of how he first came across the guitar hanging up on Asher's wall with Craig Ross. He has also mentioned Duane Allman's "Gold Top".

== Awards and nominations ==
Year	Award Show	Award/Nomination	Album	Result	Ref
2005	Grammy Awards	Grammy Award for Best Traditional Soul Gospel Album	There Will Be a Light	Won	
2005	NAACP Image Awards	NAACP Award for Outstanding Gospel Artist	There Will Be a Light	Won	

== Discography ==
=== Solo ===
- It's About Time (Anko Records, 2003)
- Weary and Wired (Blues Bureau International, 2007)
- Marc Ford and the Neptune Blues Club (Blues Bureau International, 2008)
- Fuzz Machine (BandCamp, an online-exclusive release, 2010; re-release 2020)
- Holy Ghost (Naim, 2014)
- The Vulture (2016)
- "St. James Infirmary" b/w "Backwater Blues" (single, Need To Know, 2019)
- Fuzz Machine (Self-released on vinyl/CD, 2020)
- Live In Germany (Self-released, 2021)
- Neil Songs (Released via BandCamp, Robust Records, 2023)

=== With Cathedral of Tears ===
- Cathedral of Tears – Cathedral of Tears (Enigma Records, 1984)

=== With the Scarecrows ===
- The Scarecrows – The Scarecrows featuring Marc Ford (Manic Records, rec. 1988; released 2005)

=== With Burning Tree ===
- Burning Tree (Epic Records, 1990)

=== With the Black Crowes ===
- The Black Crowes – The Southern Harmony and Musical Companion (American Recordings, 1992)
- The Black Crowes – Amorica (American Recordings, 1994)
- The Black Crowes – Three Snakes and One Charm (American Recordings, 1996)
- The Lost Crowes (Rhino, 2006), containing the previously unreleased studio albums
  - Tall (1993)
  - Band (1997)
- Freak 'n' Roll...Into the Fog (CD/DVD) (Eagle Vision, 2006)

=== With Ben Harper ===
- Ben Harper and the Innocent Criminals – Live at the Hollywood Bowl EP (Virgin Records, 2003)
- Ben Harper and the Innocent Criminals – Live at the Hollywood Bowl (DVD; Virgin Records, 2003)
- Ben Harper and the Blind Boys of Alabama – There Will Be a Light (Virgin Records, 2004)
- Ben Harper and the Blind Boys of Alabama – Live at the Apollo (Ben Harper and The Blind Boys of Alabama) (Virgin Records, 2004)
- Ben Harper and the Blind Boys Of Alabama – Live at the Apollo (DVD) (Virgin Records 2004)
- Both Sides of the Gun (Virgin Records, 2006)

=== With The Magpie Salute ===
- The Magpie Salute – Live (Eagle Rock Entertainment 2017)
- The Magpie Salute – High Water I (Eagle Rock Entertainment 2018)
- The Magpie Salute – The Killing Moon (Eagle Rock Entertainment 2019)
- The Magpie Salute – In Here EP (Eagle Rock Entertainment 2019)
- The Magpie Salute – High Water II (Eagle Rock Entertainment 2019)

=== Collaborations and tributes ===
- Izzy Stradlin and the Ju Ju Hounds – Izzy Stradlin and the Ju Ju Hounds (Geffen Records, 1992)
- Thee Hypnotics – The Very Crystal Speed Machine (American Recordings, 1994)
- The Original Harmony Ridge Creekdippers – Pacific Coast Rambler (Creek Dippers, 1998)
- Gov't Mule – Live... With a Little Help from Our Friends (Capricorn Records, 1999)
- Scott Thomas – Lovers and Thieves (Halfpipe Records, 2003)
- Songs From the Material World: A Tribute to George Harrison (Koch Records, 2003)
- Ariel Belont – Let's Rock (Dreamland Music, 2007)
- Ryan Delmore – The Spirit, the Water, and the Blood (Varietal Records, 2008)
- Mark Riley – Capture My Heart and Simply Come (Music Missions International Kaua`i, 2014)
- It's Just Craig (Craig Helmreich) – Blood On the Table (MRL Indiana, LLC, 2015)
- It's Just Craig (Craig Helmreich) – Dark Corners (MRL Indiana, LLC, 2017)
- Jim Wilson and Phil Jones – Now Playing (Swingin' Pipe Records, 2018)
- Mark Morton – Anesthetic (ANESTHETIC ) ( A Spinefarm Records/WPP Records release; 2019 WPP Records, under exclusive license to Universal Music Operations Limited 2019 WPP Records)
- JB Strauss – Piss Ant Hill JB Strauss, 'Piss Ant Hill' [Exclusive Premiere]

=== As a producer ===
- PawnShop Kings – Locksley (Owen Brothers Publishing, 2007)
- Ryan Bingham – Mescalito (Lost Highway, 2007)
- Steepwater Band – Grace and Melody (Diamond Day Records, 2008)
- Chris Lizotte – Signal Hill Revival (Varietal Records, 2008)
- Ryan Bingham – Road House Sun (Lost Highway, 2009)
- Jonny Burke – Distance and Fortune (Bandcamp, 2011)
- Phantom Limb – The Pines (2012)
- Republique du Salem – Republique du Salem (2015)
- Grainne Duffy – dirt-woman-blues (Nola Blue Records, 2023)
