= Matt Slocum (keyboardist) =

American keyboardist (born 1974)

- Born: Matthew Dutot Slocum; October 7, 1974 (age 51); Newton, Massachusetts
- Genres: Southern rock, classical music, blues-rock, gospel, funk, jazz, jazz fusion, jam band
- Instruments: Piano, Organ, Clavinet
- Years active: 2003–present

Matthew Dutot Slocum is a keyboardist who collaborates predominantly with southern jazz, funk, fusion and blues musicians. He has worked with Susan Tedeschi, Widespread Panic guitarist Jimmy Herring, Allman Brothers bassist Oteil Burbridge, The Magpie Salute, and Railroad Earth among many others.

== Early life ==
Slocum was born in Newton, Massachusetts. He began studying classical piano at the age of 8 at the South Shore Conservatory of Music in Boston. When he was 14, he moved to Alabama where he was accepted to the Alabama School of Fine Arts. In the summer of 1991, he attended the Berklee College of Music Summer Performance Program, and was ranked among the top 10 in the entire summer student body.

== Career ==
Slocum's musical career includes collaboration with Jimmy Herring, Scott Kinsey Susan Tedeschi, The Lee Boys, and Oteil and the Peacemakers—the solo project of Allman Brothers’ bassist Oteil Burbridge, Chris Fryar, B.B. King, John McLaughlin and the 4th Dimension, Gary Husband, Natalie Cole, Lenny White, Wayne Krantz, Matt Garrison, James Hunter, Jack Casady, Jorma Kaukonen, Ron Holloway, The Allman Brothers Band, producer George Drakoulias, DJ Logic, George Porter Jr., The Wailers, Derek Trucks, Page McConnell, Butch Trucks, Chuck Leavell, Jeff Sipe, Kofi Burbridge, Victor Wooten, John Popper, Jack Pearson, Hawk Tubley, Hot Tuna, Victor Atkins, David Stoltz, Mark Kimbrell, Col. Bruce Hampton and The Codetalkers, Col. Bruce Hampton and the Aquarium Rescue Unit.

Slocum performed as a member of Rich Robinson's solo band. In 2016, he joined the Magpie Salute which also features Robinson and other former members of the Black Crowes. He became a touring member of Railroad Earth in 2018.

== Discography ==
=== With Oteil and the Peacemakers ===
- Believer (2005)

=== With Jimmy Herring ===
- Lifeboat (2008)
- Subject To Change Without Notice (2013)

=== With Susan Tedeschi ===
- Back To The River (Grammy Nominated) (2008)

=== With The Lee Boys ===
- Testify (2012)

=== With Rich Robinson ===
- Flux (2016)
- Woodstock Sessions (2016)

=== With John Milham ===
- Arden’s Garden (2018)

=== With Magpie Salute ===
- Magpie Salute (Live) (2017)
- High Water I (2018)
- High Water II (2019)

=== With Jimmy Herring and John McLaughlin (Mahavishnu Orchestra) ===
- Live in San Francisco (2018)

=== With Railroad Earth ===
- Live Tracks: Underground 2.29.20 (2020)
- Live Tracks: Horn O' Plenty 11.30.19 (2020)
