= Woodstock Jazz Festival =

1981 music festival in New York

- Location: Woodstock, New York
- Years active: 1981
- Founders: Karl Berger and Ornette Coleman

The Woodstock Jazz Festival was held in 1981 in Woodstock, New York.

It was a celebration of the tenth anniversary of the Creative Music Studio, founded in 1971 by Karl Berger and Ornette Coleman.

The shows headliners were Jack DeJohnette, Chick Corea, Pat Metheny, Anthony Braxton, Lee Konitz, and Miroslav Vitouš.

Other musicians include Dewey Redman, Nana Vasconcelos, Baikida Carroll, Collin Walcott, Aiyb Dieng, Ed Blackwell, Howard Johnson and Marilyn Crispell.

It has been released several times on DVD. It was released on CD in two volumes by Knitting Factory Records.

== Setlist ==
1. "Arrival"
2. "Left Jab"
3. "We Are"
4. "Solo" – Naná Vasconcelos
5. "Broadway Blues"
6. "The Song is You"
7. "Impressions"
8. "Stella by Starlight"
9. "All Blues"
