= Karl Berger =

German-American jazz pianist (1935–2023)

- Karl Berger, c. 1985
- Born: Karl Hans Berger; March 30, 1935; Heidelberg, Gau Baden, Germany
- Died: April 9, 2023 (aged 88); Albany, New York, U.S.
- Education: Free University of Berlin
- Occupations: Jazz pianist; vibraphonist; composer; conductor; academic teacher
- Organizations: Creative Music Studio; The New School; Frankfurt University of Music and Performing Arts; University of Massachusetts Dartmouth

Karl Hans Berger (March 30, 1935 – April 9, 2023) was a German-American jazz pianist, vibraphonist, composer, and educator. He was a leading figure in jazz improvisation from the 1960s when he settled in the United States for life. He founded the educational Creative Music Studio in Woodstock, New York, in 1972 with his wife and Ornette Coleman, to encourage international students to pursue their own ideas about music.

== Life and career ==
Berger was born on March 30, 1935, in Heidelberg. He started playing classical piano when he was ten and worked in his early twenties at a club in his hometown. He learned modern jazz from visiting American musicians, such as Don Ellis and Leo Wright. During the 1960s, he started playing vibraphone. He studied musicology and sociology at the Free University of Berlin, achieving a doctoral degree in 1963 with a dissertation on music in Soviet ideology. He worked as a member of Don Cherry's band in Paris. When the band went to New York City to record Symphony for Improvisers, he recorded his debut album as a leader.

Berger worked with drummers Ed Blackwell and Jack DeJohnette, bassist Dave Holland, and saxophonists Ornette Coleman, Lee Konitz and Ivo Perelman. He worked further with Michael Bisio, Anthony Braxton and Baba Olatunji, as well as with Carla Bley, Bill Laswell John McLaughlin and Roswell Rudd, and with the Mingus Epitaph Orchestra, As musical arranger and conductor, he contributed to albums by Better Than Ezra, Buckethead, Jeff Buckley, Angélique Kidjo, Natalie Merchant and Rich Robinson, among others.

With Coleman and Ingrid Sertso, Berger's wife, he founded the Creative Music Studio (CMS) in Woodstock, New York, in 1972, to encourage students to pursue their own ideas about music. Berger considered Coleman his friend and mentor, and like Coleman he was drawn to avant-garde jazz, free jazz, and free improvisation. The focus of CMS was "teaching improvising musicians to develop their own aesthetics, and to draw and mesh ideas from across genres, traditions, and international borders". Among the teachers were John Cage, Steve Lacy, George Russell and Richard Teitelbaum. They closed the facility in 1984, but held masterclasses internationally, called World Jazz. Berger and Sertso founded Sertso Recording Studio in Woodstock in 2004.

Berger also taught at the New School, and at the Frankfurt University of Music and Performing Arts from 1994 to 2003. He then led the department of music of the University of Massachusetts Dartmouth to 2005. He and his wife revived CMS in 2013, and retired in 2017. He remained active in music for the rest of his life, releasing his final album in the fall of 2022.

Berger died at a hospital in Albany, New York, on April 9, 2023, at age 88, from complications after surgery.

== Discography ==
Berger's recordings include:

=== As leader ===
- From Now On (ESP Disk, 1967)
- Tune In (Milestone, 1969)
- We Are You (Calig, 1972)
- With Silence (Enja, 1972)
- All Kinds of Time (Sackville, 1976)
- Interludes (FMP, 1977)
- Changing the Time (Horo, 1977)
- Just Play (1976) (Quark, 1979)
- New Moon (Palcoscenico, 1980)
- Live at the Donaueschingen Music Festival (MPS, 1979)
- Transit (Black Saint, 1987)
- Karl Berger + Paul Shigihara (L+R/Bellaphon, 1991)
- Around (Black Saint, 1991)
- Sudpool Jazz Project II: Moon Dance (L+R/Bellaphon, 1992)
- Crystal Fire (Enja, 1992)
- Conversations (In+Out, 1994)
- No Man Is an Island (Douglas Music, 1997)
- Stillpoint (Double Moon, 2002)
- Strangely Familiar (Tzadik, 2010)
- Synchronicity (Nacht, 2012)
- After the Storm (FMR, 2012)
- Gently Unfamiliar (Tzadik, 2014)
- Moon (NoBusiness, 2015)
- Live at the Classical Joint (Condition West, 2017)
- In a Moment (Tzadik, 2018)
- Conjure (True Sound, 2019)
- Sketches (Fresh Sound, 2022)
- Heart is a Melody (Stunt, 2022)

=== As sideman ===
With Don Cherry

- Togetherness (Durium, 1966)
- Live at Cafe Montmartre 1966 Vols. 1–3 (ESP Disk, 1966)
- Symphony for Improvisers (Blue Note, 1966)
- Eternal Rhythm (MPS, 1969)
- Multikulti (A&M, 1990)

With Bill Laswell

- Jazzonia (Douglas Music, 1998)
- Filmtracks 2000 (Tzadik, 2001)
- Points of Order (Innerhythmic, 2001)

With Ivo Perelman

- Reverie (Leo, 2014)
- The Art of the Improv Trio Vol. 1 (Leo, 2016)
- The Hitchhiker (Leo, 2016)

With others

- Better Than Ezra, How Does Your Garden Grow? (Elektra, 1998)
- Carla Bley, Escalator Over the Hill (JCOA, 1971)
- Anthony Braxton, Creative Orchestra Music 1976 (Arista, 1976)
- Buckethead, Giant Robot (CyberOctave, 2000)
- Jeff Buckley, So Real: Songs from Jeff Buckley (Legacy/Columbia, 2007)
- Neneh Cherry, Broken Politics (Smalltown Supersound, 2018)
- Chocolate Genius, Black Music (Everlasting, 1998)
- Coheed and Cambria, Good Apollo I'm Burning Star IV (Columbia, 2005)
- Lajos Dudas, Talk of the Town (Double Moon, 2000)
- Slide Hampton, Jazz Live Trio with Guests (TCB, 2013)
- Theo Jorgensmann, Fellowship (hatOLOGY, 2005)
- Kalaparusha, Kalaparusha (Trio, 1977)
- Hans Koller, Big Sound Koller (Sonorama, 2016)
- Lee Konitz, The Lee Konitz Duets (Milestone, 1968)
- Lee Konitz, Seasons Change (Circle, 1980)
- Rolf Kuhn & Joachim Kuhn, Transfiguration (SABA, 1967)
- Sylvain Leroux, Quatuor Créole (Engine Studios, 2012)
- John Lindberg, Duets 1 (Between the Lines, 2006)
- Machine Gun, Machine Gun (MU, 1988)
- Magpie Salute, The Magpie Salute (Eagle, 2017)
- Albert Mangelsdorff, Albert Mangelsdorff and His Friends (MPS, 1971)
- Kesang Marstrand, Our Myth (North Node, 2011)
- John McLaughlin, Where Fortune Smiles (Dawn, 1971; Esoteric Recordings, 2017)
- Charles Mingus, Epitaph (Columbia, 1989)
- Ryan Montbleau, Patience On Friday (Blue's Mountain, 2007)
- Musica Elettronica Viva, United Patchwork (Horo, 1978)
- Robert Musso, Innermedium (DIW, 1999)
- Pete Namlook, Polytime (Fax, 1998)
- Rich Robinson, Through a Crooked Sun (Circle Sound 2011)
- Roswell Rudd, Blown Bone (Emanem, 2006)
- Frederic Rzewski, Attica/Coming Together/Les Moutons De Panurge (Opus One, 1974)
- Alan Silva, Skillfullness (ESP Disk, 1969)
