= High Water I =

Studio album by The Magpie Salute
- Released: August 10, 2018
- Studio: Dark Horse Studios, Nashville, TN
- Genre: Southern rock; blues rock; hard rock
- Length: 48:09
- Label: Eagle
- Producer: Rich Robinson

The Magpie Salute chronology
The Magpie Salute (2017)	High Water I (2018)	High Water II (2019)

Singles from High Water I
- 1. "Send Me an Omen" Released: June 8, 2018; 2. "For the Wind" Released: July 6, 2018; 3. "Sister Moon" Released: August 3, 2018

High Water I is the debut studio album by American rock band The Magpie Salute, released August 10, 2018 on Eagle Records. Produced by leader and guitarist Rich Robinson, it served as the follow-up to their self-titled live album released one year prior. The band's follow-up High Water II was released October 18, 2019.

== Track listing ==
No.	Title	Writer(s)	Length
1.	"Mary the Gypsy"	Rich Robinson	3:08
2.	"High Water"	John Hogg, Robinson	5:44
3.	"Send Me an Omen"	Hogg, Robinson	3:54
4.	"For the Wind"	Hogg, Robinson	5:03
5.	"Sister Moon"	Hogg, Marc Ford	3:47
6.	"Color Blind"	Hogg, Robinson	3:45
7.	"Take It All"	Hogg, Ford	3:24
8.	"Walk On Water"	Hogg, Ford	4:07
9.	"Hand in Hand"	Hogg, Robinson	3:22
10.	"You Found Me"	Robinson	4:49
11.	"Can You See"	Robinson	3:10
12.	"Open Up"	Hogg, Robinson	3:56

== Personnel ==
The Magpie Salute

- Marc Ford – guitars, vocals
- John Hogg – vocals
- Joe Magistro – drums, percussion
- Sven Pipien – bass guitar, vocals
- Rich Robinson – guitars, vocals
- Matt Slocum – keyboards, vocals

Additional musicians

- Byron House – double bass
- Dan Wistrom – pedal steel guitar

=== Production ===
- Scott Fitzgerald – photography
- Sean Genockey – mixer, recorder
- Paul Q. Kolderie – mixer
- David McClister – cover
- Rich Robinson – production, photography
- Jim Taylor – engineer
- Phil Yarnall – photography, design

== Charts ==
Chart (2018)	Peak position
US Billboard 200	33
