= Moke (British band) =

English rock band

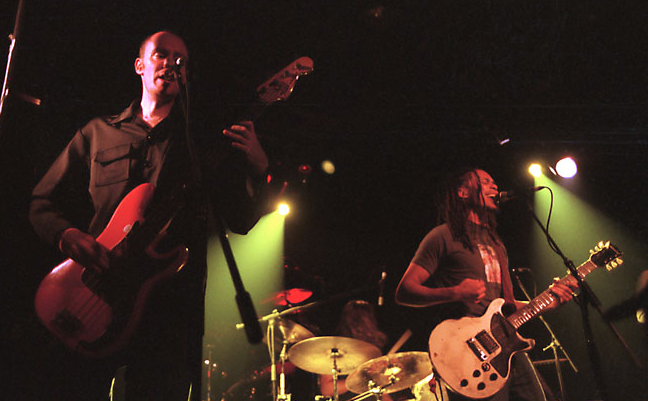
- Moke performing at The Metro, Austin TX

Background information
- Origin: London, England
- Genre: Alternative rock
- Years active: 1997–2002
- Labels: Dorado Records; Ultimatum Music; Fruit Pie Records
- Members: John Hogg; Sean Genockey; Alex Evans; John Morgan
- Website: mokesite.com

Moke were an English rock band who released two albums and a handful of singles; most notably the single "My Degeneration", described as "an angry indictment of callous youth".

== History ==
Moke formed in London, England in 1997, composed of John Hogg (vocals, guitar), Sean Genockey (guitar), Alex Evans (bass guitar), and John Morgan (drums). Moke signed to London indie label Dorado Records. The band recorded and co-produced a debut album, Superdrag (1998), described by JT Griffith of Allmusic as "hyper-eclectic, mixing a strong love for Led Zeppelin (à la compatriots Reef) with hints of rap-rock, blues, reggae, and of course classic rock". This led to a US recording contract; Superdrag was re-released in the US as a self-titled album. A second album, Carnival (2001), released on Ultimatum/Artemis Records, was produced by Paul Stacey, who also played guitar on the album. Michael Lipton of LA Weekly described the album: "Sonically and musically, this disc is a pleasure from beginning to end". While Carnival was initially released only in the United States, after the group broke up it was released in Britain by Fruit Pie Records. Critics compared the group to Oasis, The Rolling Stones, The Who, Led Zeppelin, Faith No More., Tesla, and the Red Hot Chili Peppers.

Moke toured the UK, Europe and the US extensively throughout the late 1990s / early 2000s along with many acts, including The Black Crowes, Goo Goo Dolls, Tonic, Kings X, Spacehog and Senser. After the release of Carnival, the group headlined its own tour in the U.S.

Since 2002 the band have been working on other projects. John Hogg went on to form Hookah Brown with Rich Robinson of The Black Crowes. but this group disbanded after only a few months. However, Johnny Hogg has now reunited with Rich Robinson, forming a new band The Magpie Salute along with other original Black Crowes members Marc Ford and Sven Pipien. John Morgan in playing with the original lineup of Senser. Alex Evans is a Senior Lecturer in Popular Music at Kingston University as well as Education Officer at Visconti Studio, a tape-based recording studio in partnership with Tony Visconti, the British Library and the Science Museum. Sean Genockey is a successful record producer who has worked with The Who, Roger Daltrey and the Manic Street Preachers.

Moke reunited on 16 September 2011 to perform their first concert in ten years.

== Discography ==
Year	Title	Label	Other information
1998	Superdrag	Dorado	Definitive version of début album
1999	Moke	Ultimatum	US version of début album - track order differs
1999	Superdrag	Avex	14 track Japanese only version of début album
2001	Carnival	Artemis Records	Second album from Moke - US release only
