= High Water II =

Studio album by The Magpie Salute
- Released: October 18, 2019
- Studios: Dark Horse Studios; Rockfield Studios
- Label: Eagle
- Producer: Rich Robinson

The Magpie Salute chronology
| High Water I (2018) | High Water II (2019) |

Professional ratings
Aggregate scores
| Source | Rating |
|---|---|
| Metacritic | 74/100 |
Review scores
| Source | Rating |
| AllMusic | 3/5 stars |
| American Songwriter | 4/5 stars |

High Water II is the second and last studio album by American band The Magpie Salute. It was released on October 18, 2019 under Provogue Records in the UK and Eagle Records elsewhere.

== Chart performance ==
High Water II debuted at number 1 on the UK Official Charts Company's Jazz & Blues albums on October 25, 2019. It also peaked at number 154 on Ultratop's Wallonia charts, number 63 in Germany, number 24 in Scotland, and number 77 in Switzerland.

== Critical reception ==
High Water II was met with "generally favorable" reviews from critics. At Metacritic, which assigns a weighted average rating out of 100 to reviews from mainstream publications, this release received an average score of 74, based on 6 reviews.

== Track listing ==
High Water II track listing
| No. | Title | Length |
|---|---|---|
| 1. | "Sooner Or Later" | 3:33 |
| 2. | "Gimme Something" | 4:05 |
| 3. | "Leave It All Behind" | 3:01 |
| 4. | "In Here" | 3:22 |
| 5. | "You And I" | 3:47 |
| 6. | "Mother Storm" | 4:07 |
| 7. | "A Mirror" | 4:13 |
| 8. | "Lost Boy" | 4:22 |
| 9. | "Turn It Around" | 3:55 |
| 10. | "Life Is A Landslide" | 4:12 |
| 11. | "Doesn't Really Matter" | 4:29 |
| 12. | "Where Is This Place" | 4:11 |

== Personnel ==
Musicians

- John Hogg – vocals
- Marc Ford – vocals, guitar
- Joe Magistro – drums
- Sven Pipien – vocals, bass
- Matt Slocum – keyboards
- Rich Robinson – vocals, guitar, producer
- Alison Krauss – vocals, fiddle
- Matt Holland – horn

Production

- Chris Athens – mastering
- Joe Jones – assistant engineer
- Sean Genockey – mixer, engineer
- Laurent Chanez – photography

== Charts ==
Chart performance for High Water II
| Chart (2019) | Peak position |
|---|---|
| Belgian Albums (Ultratop Wallonia) | 154 |
| German Albums (Offizielle Top 100) | 63 |
| Scottish Albums (Official Charts) | 24 |
| Swiss Albums (Schweizer Hitparade) | 77 |
| UK Jazz & Blues Albums (Official Charts) | 1 |
| UK Independent Albums (Official Charts) | 8 |
| US Top Album Sales (Billboard) | 65 |
| US Heatseekers Albums (Billboard) | 7 |
