= Filmtracks 2000 =

Studio album by Bill Laswell
- Released: September 25, 2001
- Recorded: Orange Music, West Orange, NJ
- Genre: Ambient dub, drum and bass, funk
- Length: 56:38
- Label: Tzadik
- Producer: Bill Laswell

Bill Laswell chronology
Radioaxiom: A Dub Transmission (2001)	Filmtracks 2000 (2001)	Points of Order (2001)

Professional ratings
Review scores
Source	Rating
Allmusic	3/5 stars

Filmtracks 2000 is the thirteenth album by American composer Bill Laswell, released on September 25, 2001 by Tzadik Records. Despite the title's suggestion, the album is not a collection of Laswell's film scores. Instead it is an assemblage of new compositions which contain the hallmarks of soundtrack music, drawing influences from the music of India, Asia and the Middle East.

== Track listing ==
All music is composed by Bill Laswell.

No.	Title	Length
1.	"Oman"	5:23
2.	"Turf War"	3:22
3.	"Oum el Bouaghi"	9:09
4.	"Haji Baig"	2:12
5.	"Into the Void"	4:16
6.	"Comoro 1"	1:36
7.	"Siren Song"	3:33
8.	"Soldiers of Misfortune"	2:21
9.	"Deadly Haven"	4:47
10.	"Portals"	1:59
11.	"Jammu"	2:50
12.	"Abu Sayyam"	0:37
13.	"The Taliban"	4:58
14.	"Comoro 2"	1:24
15.	"Odyssey"	2:39
16.	"El-Oued"	5:32

== Personnel ==
Adapted from the Filmtracks 2000 liner notes.

Musicians

- Ginger Baker – drums
- Karl Berger – musical arrangements
- Aïyb Dieng – talking drum, percussion
- Tata Güines – instruments
- Graham Haynes – cornet
- Jonas Hellborg – acoustic bass guitar, fretless bass guitar, Wal MIDI bass
- Bill Laswell – bass guitar, six-string bass, fretless bass guitar, drum programming, keyboards, effects
- Nicky Skopelitis – six-string guitar, twelve-string guitar, bağlama, coral sitar, Fairlight CMI
- Omar Faruk Tekbilek – ney, zurna
- Jah Wobble – bass guitar
- Bernie Worrell – Hammond organ

Technical personnel

- Heung-Heung Chin – cover art
- Robert Musso – engineering
- Allan Tucker – mastering

== Release history ==
Region	Date	Label	Format	Catalog
United States	2001	Tzadik	CD	TZ 7511
