= Paper (album) =

Studio album by Rich Robinson
- Released: August 24, 2004
- Recorded: 2004
- Genre: Blues rock, hard rock
- Label: Keyhole Records

Rich Robinson chronology
Paper (2004)	Through a Crooked Sun (2011)

Professional ratings
Review scores
Source	Rating
Allmusic	2.5/5 stars
Classic Rock	3.5/5 stars
Elmore Magazine	85/100

Paper is the debut solo album from Black Crowes guitarist Rich Robinson. This album contains brand new material along with songs that were initially written for Robinson's 2002–2003 project, Hookah Brown. Robinson handled guitar, bass, and other instruments as well as taking over the lead vocals, with the gaps being filled in by Joe Magistro (drums), Eddie Harsch (keyboards, credited as Eddie Hawrsch), Donnie Herron (fiddle, violin) and his son Taylor Robinson (percussion).

== Track listing ==
1. "Yesterday I Saw You" – 3:22
2. "Enemy" – 2:56
3. "Leave It Alone" – 3:43
4. "Know Me" – 4:01
5. "Forgiven Song" – 3:36
6. "Veil" – 3:36
7. "When You Will" – 5:18
8. "Places" – 7:12
9. "Begin" – 4:16
10. "Falling Away" – 4:13
11. "Baby" – 4:10
12. "Oh No" – 3:40
13. "Answers" – 5:09
14. "It's Over" – 5:13

== Reissue ==
In late 2015, Robinson signed a new record contract with Eagle Rock Entertainment, who would be releasing the album he planned to release in 2016. As part of the deal between the two, Eagle Rock agreed to re-release Robinson's back catalog, beginning with Paper on February 26, 2016. This proved to be somewhat of a challenge for Robinson, as the master tapes for the album had been significantly damaged during Hurricane Sandy in October 2012. As a result, all of Robinson's original vocal tracks had been erased. Thus, Robinson was forced to return to the studio and re-record his vocals in order to reissue the album on schedule. "At first I was like, 'Oh, shit. While I'm making my new record I also have to re-sing Paper?'" Robinson told Billboard magazine in 2016. "But it was cool in a sense. We got in the studio and put 'em up, and I was like, 'Man, this fucking thing sounds great!'"

While afforded the opportunity to revisit the album's vocals, Robinson made the decision to also rewrite some of his original lyrics. "(I)t was great to remix and re-sing (the songs), tweak the words a little bit, pull out lines I couldn't stand to sing, and it just turned out great," he noted. In the end, "When You Will," "Begin" and "Falling Away" received minor lyrical adjustments, while "Oh No" had its verse lyrics and melody completely altered, resulting in it being retitled as "Cause You're With Me." "It's Over" was returned to its original, pre-Paper title of "Goodbye," but its lyrics remained intact from the originally released version.

Aside from the lyrical alterations, Robinson opted to add three previously unreleased tracks to the record. The first, "Stand Up," originally appeared during Robinson's Hookah Brown days and was a regular setlist staple during his 2004 solo tour. The other two inclusions were tracks that were intended to be on the original release of Paper but weren't completed in time for release - "Walking By Myself" and "Words of the Chosen." Both of these songs also appeared in Robinson's 2004 tour setlists, but much more sporadically than "Stand Up." Also worth noting is that the version of "Words of the Chosen" included on the Paper reissue is an instrumental, while on the 2004 tour it included vocals.

As a final touch, Robinson restructured the track listing for Paper, resulting in:

1. Know Me – 4:07
2. Enemy – 2:56
3. Stand Up – 3:46
4. Leave It Alone – 3:48
5. Words of the Chosen – 5:59
6. Yesterday I Saw You – 3:21
7. Places – 7:16
8. Veil – 3:37
9. Walking By Myself – 3:40
10. Forgiven Song – 5:45
11. When You Will – 5:00
12. Baby – 4:16
13. Begin – 4:20
14. Falling Away – 4:15
15. Cause You're With Me – 3:58
16. Answers – 5:13
17. Goodbye – 5:35
