= Points of Order =

Studio album by Bill Laswell
- Released: October 1, 2001
- Recorded: Orange Music, West Orange, NJ
- Genre: Electronic, drum and bass, nu jazz
- Length: 48:06
- Label: Innerhythmic
- Producer: Bill Laswell

Bill Laswell chronology
Filmtracks 2000 (2001)	Points of Order (2001)	Psychonavigation 5 (2002)

Professional ratings
Review scores
Source	Rating
Allmusic	4/5 stars
Alternative Press	3.5/5 stars

Points of Order (also known as Cyclops) is the fourteenth album by American composer Bill Laswell, released on October 1, 2001 by Innerhythmic. It was originally issued as a digital download through eMusic in the MP3 format.

== Track listing ==
No.	Title	Writer(s)	Length
1.	"X29"	Bill Laswell	7:19
2.	"Staple Nex"	Beans, High Priest, Bill Laswell, M. Sayyid	5:00
3.	"Broken Toenail Gland"	Beans, High Priest, Bill Laswell, M. Sayyid	4:46
4.	"Cyclops"	Bill Laswell	6:18
5.	"White Ark"	Bill Laswell	1:47
6.	"Iron Cross"	Bill Laswell	11:09
7.	"Conquer Worm"	Bill Laswell	4:16
8.	"Lightning Teleportation"	Bill Laswell	7:31

== Personnel ==
Adapted from the Points of Order liner notes.

Musicians

- Antipop Consortium – rap
- Karl Berger – piano
- Buckethead – guitar
- Graham Haynes – cornet
- Karsh Kale – drums
- Toshinori Kondo – trumpet
- Bill Laswell – bass guitar, drum programming, effects, producer

Technical personnel

- John Brown – cover art
- Michael Fossenkemper – mastering
- Robert Musso – engineering

== Release history ==
Region	Date	Label	Format	Catalog
United States	2001	Innerhythmic	CD	INR011
