= Marc Ford and the Neptune Blues Club =

Studio album by Marc Ford
- Released: September 23, 2008
- Recorded: at Compound Studio by Anthony Arvizu & Jeff Lewis, mixed by A.Arvizu
- Genre: Blues rock, jam rock, Southern rock
- Label: Blues Bureau International
- Producer: Marc Ford

Marc Ford chronology
Weary and Wired (2007)	Marc Ford and the Neptune Blues Club (2008)	Fuzz Machine (2010)

Marc Ford and the Neptune Blues Club is the third album (and the first one with his new band The Neptune Blues Club) by guitarist/singer-songwriter Marc Ford. The album was released on September 15, 2008 (UK) and September 23, 2008 (US) on the Blues Bureau International label.

Marc Ford has gathered into The Neptune Blues Club experienced blues musicians of Southern California, who's played earlier in The Blasters, Hazmat Modine, Tom Waits' band, with Big Joe Turner, Mick Taylor, Joe Houston, Hubert Sumlin, The Fabulous Thunderbirds, Gatemouth Brown, David Lynch, Bruce Willis, Top Jimmy, Lester Butler, Lee Allen, Nels Cline, Greg Ginn among others.

== Track listing ==
1. Main Drain
2. Locked Down Tight
3. Freedom Fighter
4. Go Too Soon
5. Don't Get Me Killed (M.Malone, M.Ford)
6. Last Time Around
7. Spaceman
8. Pay for My Mistakes (M.Malone)
9. Shame On Me
10. Mother's Day (M.Malone)
11. Smilin' (M.Ford, A.Arvizu, J.Bazz, M.Malone)
12. Keep Holdin' On

All songs written by Marc Ford, except as indicated.

== The Neptune Blues Club ==
- Marc Ford – Vocals, Electric guitar, record producer
- Mike Malone – Vocals (5,8,10), Keys, Backing vocals, Harmonica (5,8)
- Anthony Arvizu – Drums, Sound engineer
- John Bazz – Upright bass
- Stephen Hodges – Junkyard percussion
- Bill Barrett – Harmonica (except 5,8)
