= Through a Crooked Sun =

Studio album by Rich Robinson
- Released: October 11, 2011
- Recorded: 2011
- Genre: Blues rock, hard rock
- Label: Circle Sound, Thirty Tigers
- Producer: Rich Robinson

Rich Robinson chronology
Paper (2004)	Through a Crooked Sun (2011)	The Ceaseless Sight (2014)

Professional ratings
Review scores
Source	Rating
AllMusic	3.5/5 stars

Through a Crooked Sun is the second solo album from Black Crowes guitarist Rich Robinson. This album contains twelve studio tracks and features guest appearances by Warren Haynes, John Medeski, Karl Berger and Larry Campbell. The UK edition was released on March 26, 2012. The title of the album was taken from Look Through My Window, a song from the EP Llama Blues.

== Track listing ==
1. "Gone Away"
2. "It's Not Easy"
3. "Lost and Found"
4. "I Don't Hear the Sound of You"
5. "Hey Fear"
6. "All Along the Way"
7. "Follow You Forever"
8. "Standing On the Surface of the Sun"
9. "Bye Bye Baby"
10. "Falling Again"
11. "Station Man"
12. "Fire Around"
13. "By The Light of The Sunset Moon" (UK Edition bonus track, from the Llama Blues EP)
14. "Look Through My Window" (UK Edition bonus track, from the Llama Blues EP)
15. "Broken Stick Crown" (UK Edition bonus track, from the Llama Blues EP)
16. "Run Run" (UK Edition bonus track, from the Llama Blues EP)

== Bonus EP ==
At independent record stores and at live performances, Robinson made available a four-song EP entitled Llama Blues. Intended as a companion to the full-length album, Llama Blues featured blues-based tracks similar in sound to the full LP's final track, "Fire Around." The EP was also available in MP3 format from some digital retailers, and the UK/European edition of Through A Crooked Sun included the songs as bonus tracks at the end of the album.

Tracklist

1. "By The Light of The Sunset Moon"
2. "Look Through My Window"
3. "Broken Stick Crown"
4. "Run Run"

== Credits ==
"Gone Away":
Rich Robinson: guitars, vocals, bass
Joe Magistro: drums, percussion
Steve Molitz: keyboards

"It's Not Easy":
Rich Robinson: guitars, vocals, bass
Joe Magistro: drums, percussion
Steve Molitz: keyboards

"Lost and Found":
Rich Robinson: guitars, vocals, bass
Joe Magistro: drums, percussion
Steve Molitz: keyboards

"I Don't Hear the Sound of You":
Rich Robinson: guitars, vocals, bass, organ
Joe Magistro: drums, percussion
Steve Molitz: keyboards
Karl Berger: metallophone
John Lindberg: upright bass

"Hey Fear":
Rich Robinson: guitars, vocals, bass
Joe Magistro: drums, percussion
Steve Molitz: keyboards

"All Along the Way":
Rich Robinson: guitars, vocals
Joe Magistro: drums, percussion

"Follow You Forever":
Rich Robinson: guitars, vocals, bass, organ
Joe Magistro: drums, percussion
Karl Berger: piano

"Standing On the Surface of the Sun":
Rich Robinson: guitars, vocals, bass
Joe Magistro: drums, percussion
Steve Molitz: keyboards

"Bye Bye Baby":
Rich Robinson: guitars, vocals, bass
Joe Magistro: drums, percussion
Steve Molitz: keyboards
Warren Haynes: slide guitar, acoustic guitar
Larry Campbell: pedal steel
John Lindberg: upright bass

"Falling Again":
Rich Robinson: guitars, vocals, bass
Joe Magistro: drums, percussion
Steve Molitz: keyboards
Larry Campbell: pedal steel

"Station Man":
Rich Robinson: guitars, vocals, bass
Joe Magistro: drums, percussion
Steve Molitz: keyboards
John Medeski: keyboards
Dana Thompson: vocals

"Fire Around":
Rich Robinson: guitars, vocals, bass
Joe Magistro: drums, percussion
Steve Molitz: keyboards

Produced by: Rich Robinson
Engineered by: Chris Bittner
Mixed by: Chris Bittner and Mike Birnbaum
Mastered at Sterling Sound by: Chris Athens
Recorded and mixed at Applehead Studios

All songs written by: Rich Robinson, except "Station Man" written by: Danny Kirwan / Jeremy Spencer / John McVie.

== Song notes ==
"Standing On the Surface of the Sun" featured a portion of an abandoned song found on a Black Crowes rehearsal tape for what would become the sessions for their 2001 album, Lions. "Station Man" was originally released by Fleetwood Mac on their album Kiln House (1970). It was the first of their post-Peter Green albums.
