= Creative Music Studio =

- Woodstock, New York; United States

Information
- Type: Study center of jazz and world music
- Established: 1971
- Founder: Karl Berger; Ingrid Sertso; Ornette Coleman
- Closed: 1984 (at the location)
- Website: www.creativemusicstudio.org

The Creative Music Studio (CMS) was a premier study center for contemporary creative music during the 1970s and 1980s, based in Woodstock, New York. Founded in 1971 by Karl Berger, Ingrid Sertso, and Ornette Coleman, it brought together students and leading innovators in the jazz and world music communities. Unprecedented in its range and diversity, CMS has provided participants with an opportunity to interact personally with musical giants of improvisation and musical thought.

At CMS, the concept of 'Worldjazz' was born: the improvisational and compositional expansion of the world's musical traditions, guided by authentic leaders. Hundreds of live concerts were recorded, many regarded as landmark performances. Thousands of workshops, master classes, concerts and colloquia inspired a generation of musicians. In 1981, the organization celebrated its 10th anniversary at a concert titled the "Woodstock Jazz Festival".

The CMS facility in Woodstock closed in 1984, but its masterclasses continued as the World Jazz Encounters program internationally. In 2013, a facility was re-established, with sessions in the spring and fall, in Big Indian, New York. CMS began to digitize the archive of performances recorded during CMS workshops and special events.

== History ==
In 1971 musicians Karl Berger, Ingrid Sertso (his wife) and Ornette Coleman founded the Creative Music Foundation. Its initial advisory board, composed of legends from all aspects of music, the arts and philosophy, included composer John Cage, conductor/musician Gil Evans, philosopher/educator Buckminster Fuller, composer George Russell, painter Willem de Kooning and composer/conductor Gunther Schuller. Their goal was to establish a nonprofit organization focused on improvisation and musical cross-pollination that complemented musicians’ academic studies, a place where music as a universal language could be explored and expanded. They called it the Creative Music Studio, or CMS. Courses began in 1972.

Established in New York as a 501(c) 3 nonprofit organization, for most of its 40 years, the organization's main program was the CMS at a physical location in Woodstock, NY, where musicians from all over the world lived, played, interacted with each other and created a body of music. Based on a 45-acre campus with multiple residences, workshop rooms and performance halls, hundreds of Guiding Artists, including several MacArthur ‘Genius’ Award winners (George Lewis, John Zorn, Cecil Taylor, John Cage, Charlie Haden), lived, played and shared musical wisdom with thousands of participants, many of whom became well-known musicians, including Peter Apfelbaum, Steven Bernstein, Cyro Baptista, Marilyn Crispell, Sylvain Leroux and John Zorn.

The CMS facility closed in 1984, but its masterclasses continued in the World Jazz Encounters program, holding masterclasses internationally, in the United States, Germany, Italy, Brazil, West Africa, India, the Philippines and Japan.

Berger and his wife re-established a CMS facility in 2013, with sessions in the spring and fall, in Big Indian, New York. In addition, the Creative Music Foundation began efforts to digitize the immense archive of recorded performances recorded during CMS workshops and special events.

Over 550 concerts were recorded and were digitized as part of the CMS Archive Project. In 2012, Columbia University Library purchased the CMS Archive to preserve it for posterity. Some of the performances in the Archive are included in recordings made available to the public. Two three-CD sets were produced in 2014 and 2015 and garnered rave reviews from critics worldwide, including being named ‘Best Historical Release’ by Cadence and Jazz Times magazine.

Rob Saffer, who served as executive director from 2010 to 2017, supported the CMS Archive Project, CD compilations, a CMS Oral History Project, a partnership with Columbia University Jazz Studies Program, improvisers performances and ongoing residencies, continuing workshops and performances in New York City, Woodstock and around the world.

In 2013, CMS began hosting residential workshops in the Catskills again, at the Full Moon Resort. Artists at these workshops have included MacArthur Fellows Vijay Iyer and Steve Coleman, 2016 Pulitzer Prize winning composer Henry Threadgill as well as Dave Douglas, Joe Lovano, John Medeski and Steven Bernstein, among others. A CMS Scholarship Program has enabled roughly half of workshop participants to receive full or partial scholarships, helping musicians from Brazil, Mexico, Germany, Israel, Poland and the USA attend workshops.

In 2018, Billy Martin assumed the position of president of CMS.

== CMS Timeline 1965-2018 ==
The timeline is based on the organization's history records.

1965–1966

• Karl and Ingrid come to New York. Karl comes as a member of Don Cherry's band.

1967

• Karl joins Horacee Arnold, Sam Rivers, and Reggie Workman for “Young Audiences” teaching program in New York public schools.

1970–1971

• Karl takes over John Cage's teaching position at the New School for Social Research. 1971

• Ornette Coleman, Karl Berger, and Ingrid Sertso establish the Creative Music Foundation. 1973

• Creative Music Studio begins offering instructional workshops at various locations in Woodstock, New York.

• Early sessions feature Karl and Ingrid, Leroy Jenkins, Dave Holland, Jack DeJohnette, Lee Konitz, Don Cherry, Sam Rivers, Richard Teitelbaum, Stu Martin, Garrett List, and Ed Blackwell.

1975

• Karl and Ingrid first travel to Naropa Institute in Boulder, Colorado, at the invitation of Chogyam Trungpa Rinpoche, who gave Ingrid the name Sertso (“gold lake of understanding”).

• CMS moves into Lutheran camp in Mt. Tremper, New York.

1977

• Creative Music Foundation purchases Oehler's Mountain Lodge.

1978

• Writers Allen Ginsberg and Ed Sanders hold poetry workshops at CMS.

• CMS receives Comprehensive Employment and Training Act (CETA) grant.

• New Year's Intensive session with the Art Ensemble of Chicago strengthens the connection between CMS and the Chicago-based Association for the Advancement of Creative Musicians (AACM).

• Garret List organizes the first of three Composers’ Colloquia. This one includes Ken McIntyre, John Cage, Maryanne Amacher, Michael Gibbs, Frederic Rzewski, Christian Wolff, Carla Bley, Garret List, and Karl Berger.

1979

• Art Ensemble of Chicago returns for a second New Year's Intensive.

• CMS's Woodstock Workshop Orchestra takes a four-week tour of Europe. The orchestra includes Karl and Ingrid, Oliver Lake, Lee Konitz, Trilok Gurtu, Don Cherry, George Lewis, and many CMS participants.

• The first of a series of annual world-music summer festivals/seminars includes Don Cherry, Trilok Gurtu, Steve Gorn, Alhaji Bai Konte, Nana Vasconcelos, Guilherme Franco, and others.

• Roscoe Mitchell leads a summer session with workshops by Joseph Jarman, George Lewis, Anthony Braxton, Leo Smith, and A. Spencer Barefield.

1980

• New Year's Intensive session features Cecil Taylor.

• Karl conducts “Advanced Studies in Improvisational Composition” at the Banff Centre School of Fine Arts in Banff, Alberta, Canada, with Dave Holland, Sam Rivers, Ed Blackwell, Frederic Rzewski, and others.

• Summer world-music festival includes Jerry Gonzalez, Aiyb Dieng, Mandingo Griot Society with Adam Rudolph, Ismet Siral, Haci Tekbilek, and many of the artists from the 1979 session.

• Composers’ Colloquium includes Douglas Ewart, Muhal Richard Abrams, George Lewis (all from the AACM), and others.

1981

• Woodstock Jazz Festival held as a fund raiser. Pat Metheny, Chick Corea, Anthony Braxton, Lee Konitz, Jack DeJohnette, Ed Blackwell, and a host of CMS participants perform.

• Watazumido Dozo Roshi, bamboo flute master and Japanese national treasure visits CMS.

• Pauline Oliveros comes to CMS to help develop and sustain the organization.

1982

• New Year's Intensive session features Pat Metheny, Jack DeJohnette, and Dave Holland.

• Summer world music festival features Babtaunde Olatunji as well as various reggae bands.

1983

• Karl and Ingrid purchase a house on the property of the Lutheran Camp in Mt. Tremper, where CMS had been located 1975–1977. It's called Welcome House and serves as a residence and a workshop/performance space.

1984

• Oehler's Mountain Lodge is sold. Workshops continue for a brief time at Welcome House, but CMS activities soon come to an end. Jimmy Cobb, Roswell Rudd, Olatunji, and others taught at Welcome House. 1984–1989

• Karl travels to The Philippines, India, Europe, and Japan under the auspices of the Goethe-Institut. Ingrid travels with him to Africa and Brazil. The Africa trip is hosted by Babatunde Olatunji. Trilok Gurtu accompanies Karl to India.

1991

• Karl begins teaching at Hochschule für Musik und Darstellende Kunst, Frankfurt am Main (Frankfurt University of Music and Performing Arts). For most of the nineties, Karl travels back and forth between Woodstock and Germany.

2002

• Karl begins teaching at University of Massachusetts Dartmouth.

2004

• Karl and Ingrid open Sertso Studio in Woodstock to provide a hospitable recording environment for CMS artists and others from Woodstock and New York City.

2006

• “In the Spirit of Don Cherry” series of performances launches. The first features Karl and Ingrid, Graham Haynes, Carlos Ward, Peter Apfelbaum, Bob Stewart, Mark Helias, and Billy Elgart. The group performs compositions by Don Cherry, Karl Berger, and Peter Apfelbaum, who was Don's musical director in Don's later years.

• First session of Ismet Siral Creative Music Studio workshops and concerts takes place in Istanbul, Turkey. Karl and Ingrid bring Steve Gorn, Carlos Ward, Graham Haynes, John Lindberg, Tani Tabbal, Henry Grimes, Marilyn Crispell, and Trilok Gurtu. Many leading Turkish musicians participate.

2007

• Ted Orr begins digitizing the CMS audio archive at Sertso Studio.

2009

• Rob Saffer begins working with Karl and the Creative Music Foundation. He creates a business plan and CMS's first website.

2010

• Second session of Ismet Siral Creative Music Studio workshops and concerts takes place in Istanbul, Turkey. Karl and Ingrid, Adam Rudolph, Cyro Baptista, John Zorn (and his Masada bandmates Marc Ribot, Kenny Wolleson, and Greg Cohen), John Lindberg, Oliver Lake, Trilok Gurtu, Kenny Wessel, Steve Gorn, Tani Tabbal, Haci Tekbilek, and Omar Tekbilek all participate.

• Rob Saffer joins the Creative Music Foundation's board of directors and begins to take an active role as CMS's producer.

• CMS and Columbia University Libraries enter into an agreement that will lead to Columbia being the long-term home of the CMS archives.

2011

• Jazz Studies Program at Columbia University presents “The Creative Music Studio: A Symposium.” Four panels speak on CMS's past, future, and impact. Panels include Karl Berger, Ingrid Sertso, Rob Saffer, Bob Sweet, Ted Orr, Adam Rudolph, Don Davis, Steve Gorn, Sylvain Leroux, Marilyn Crispell, James Emery, Oliver Lake, and Ilene Marder.

• Karl holds the first of his Karl Berger Improvisers Orchestra workshop/rehearsal performances at The Stone in New York City.

2013

• Fortieth anniversary celebration and workshops are held at the Full Moon Resort in Big Indian, New York. The spring session features John Medeski, Mark Helias, Oliver Lake, Don Byron, Dave Douglas, Steven Bernstein, Marilyn Crispell, Steve Gorn, guitarist Ken Wessel, Mark Helias, Ken Filiano, Harvey Sorgen, Tani Tabbal, Thomas Buckner, Ingrid Sertso, Karl Berger, and Savia Berger.

• MacArthur Foundation Fellow Vijay Iyer teaches at the fall fortieth-anniversary session. He joins Cyro Baptista, Peter Apfelbaum, Tony Malaby, Jason Hwang, Kirk Knuffke, Tom Rainey, Kenny Wessel, Steve Gorn, Harvey Sorgen, Mark Helias, Thomas Buckner, Karl Berger, and Ingrid Sertso.

• CMS begins to record videos of all workshops.

2014

• Innova Recordings releases the first three-CD set of CMS archive recordings. Performers include Ed Blackwell, Charles Brackeen, David Izenson, Ingrid Sertso, Frederic Rzewsk, Ursula Oppens, Karl Berger, Leroy Jenkins, James Emery, Olu Dara, Michael Gregory, James Harvey, Garrett List, Steve Gorn, Adam Rudolph, Hamid Drake, John Marsh, CMS Orchestra. Oliver Lake, Roscoe Mitchell, Ismet Siral, Nana Vasconcelos, and Foday Musa Suso.

• Innova archive recordings are reviewed in Jazziz, Jazz Weekly, Woodstock Times, New York City Jazz Record, and other publications.

• CMS receives Grammy Foundation grant for archive audio-tape digitization project.

• Successful Kickstarter and Hatchfund crowdsource fund-raising campaigns are launched. 2015

• CMS receives second Grammy Foundation grant for archive audio-tape digitization project.

• Volume 1 of the CMS archive recordings is reviewed in Down Beat and Jazz Times. Cadence calls it the best historical jazz record of 2014.

• Planet Arts releases volume 2 of the CMS archive recordings, which features performances by Anthony Braxton/Marilyn Crispell, Kalaparusha Maurice McIntyre, Frederic Rzewski/Karl Berger, Paul Motian/Charles Brackeen/David Izenzon, Lee Konitz/Karl Berger/Peter Apfelbaum, Don Cherry, Baikida Carroll, Gerry Hemingway, Ismet Siral/Steve Gorn/Trilok Gurtu, Collin Walcott/Aiyb Dieng/Nana Vasconcelos/Trilok Gurtu, Amadou Jarr, Aiyb Dieng/Karl Berger, Paulo Moura.

• Key Elements Group hired as consultants in fund raising and organizational development.

• New board of directors appointed.

• Amir ElSaffar leads the first CMS workshop focusing on Arabic music.

• Rudresh Mahanthappa teaches the first Carnatic jazz workshop at CMS.

• Karl Berger Improvisers Orchestra presents its 83rd performance in New York City.

2016

• Audio archive project is completed. All audio tapes are now digitized and preserved for posterity.

• Creative Music Foundation expands its board of directors to thirteen members.

• Creative Music Foundation helps to sponsor Ecole Fula Flute educational project in Guinea, West Africa, organized and implemented by CMS alumnus Sylvain Leroux.

2017

• Karl Berger, Ingrid Sertso, Steven Bernstein, Billy Martin and Peter Apfelbaum preside in residency at The Stone, John Zorn's performance space in New York City.

2018

• Billy Martin appointed president of the Creative Music Studio.
