= The Ceaseless Sight =

Studio album by Rich Robinson
- Released: May 30, 2014
- Recorded: Applehead Recording, Woodstock, NY
- Genre: Blues rock, hard rock
- Length: 55:32
- Label: The End Records
- Producer: Rich Robinson

Rich Robinson chronology
Through a Crooked Sun (2011)	The Ceaseless Sight (2014)	Flux (2016)

Professional ratings
Review scores
Source	Rating
Rolling Stone	3.5/5 stars

The Ceaseless Sight is the third solo album from Black Crowes guitarist Rich Robinson.

== Track listing ==
All tracks are written by Rich Robinson.

The Ceaseless Sight track listing
No.	Title	Length
1.	"I Know You"	4:13
2.	"Down The Road"	4:11
3.	"One Road Hill"	4:18
4.	"The Giving Key"	5:45
5.	"This Unfortunate Show"	3:47
6.	"In Comes The Night"	4:16
7.	"Inside"	4:01
8.	"I Have a Feeling"	5:31
9.	"I Remember"	3:49
10.	"In You"	5:15
11.	"Trial and Faith"	5:41
12.	"Obscure the Day"	4:52
Total length:		55:32

== Personnel ==
- Rich Robinson – guitars, vocals
- Joe Magistro – drums
- Marco Benevento – keyboards
- Amy Helm – Vocals on "The Giving Key" and "One Road Hill"
- Katrine Ottosen – Vocals on "This Unfortunate Show"
- Steve Molitz – Keyboard on "Down the Road"

=== Production ===
- Produced by Rich Robinson
- Engineered by Chris Bittner
- Mixed by Chris Bittner and Mike Birnbaum
- Master by Chris Athens
