= It's About Time (Marc Ford album) =

Studio album by Marc Ford
- Released: 2002
- Genre: Blues rock, Southern rock, roots rock
- Label: Anko

Marc Ford chronology
It's About Time (2002)	Weary and Wired (2007)

It's About Time is a 2002 album by American rock guitarist and singer Marc Ford, former guitarist of the Black Crowes. It was the debut solo album by Ford, and received good reviews. Notable musicians who collaborated with Ford on this album include Ben Harper, Gary Louris (The Jayhawks), Warren Haynes, Allen Woody, Matt Abts (Gov't Mule) and Craig Ross (Lenny Kravitz).

== Track listing ==
1. Hell or Highwater (4:30)
2. Long Way Down (3:09)
3. A Change of Mind (4:39)
4. When You Go (3:32)
5. Giving (3:51)
6. Idle Time (4:25)
7. Two Mules and a Rainbow (4:23)
8. Cry, Moan and Wail (4:23)
9. Shining Again (4:40)
10. Elijah (3:09)
11. Wake Up and Walk Away (4:27)
12. Feels Like Doin' Time (3:51)
13. California (3:28)
14. Darlin' I've Been Dreamin' (2:30)
15. Just Let It Go (9:08)

== Personnel ==
- Marc Ford (guitar, bass guitar, percussions, lead vocals)
- Jimmy Ashhurst (bass guitar)
- Paul Bogan (guitar)
- Craig Ross (guitar)
- Warren Haynes (guitar)
- Ethan Johns (percussions)
- Christopher Joyner (keyboards)
- Matt Laug (percussions)
- Michael Lord (Hammond organ)
- Gary Louris (guitar, vocals)
- Matt Abts (drums)
- Charlie Quintana (drums)
- Greg Sowders (drums)
- Chris Stills (vocals)
- Mike Stinson (drums)
- C.C. White (vocals)
- Allen Woody (bass guitar)
