= Flux (Rich Robinson album) =

Studio album by Rich Robinson
- Released: June 24, 2016
- Recorded: Applehead Recording, Woodstock, NY
- Genre: Blues rock, hard rock
- Label: Eagle Rock Entertainment
- Producer: Rich Robinson

Rich Robinson chronology
The Ceaseless Sight (2014)	Flux (2016)

Flux is the fourth solo album from Black Crowes guitarist Rich Robinson. It is his first for Eagle Rock Entertainment and features guest appearances by Charlie Starr of Blackberry Smoke and former Hookah Brown bandmate John Hogg.

== Production ==
Robinson said of the recording process of Flux: “I love being in the recording studio. It fuels the desire to create within me. I enjoy watching it unfold. Each development fires another idea and in the end, you have this organically created song that seemingly came out of nowhere. It brings me such joy and peace. It never ceases to amaze me.”

Robinson further commented on the recording process of Flux, remarking: "On my last record, The Ceaseless Sight, I didn’t have as many songs. I had a few songs and parts of other songs and I wanted to use the studio to finish them. I liked the way it turned out, so for this record I said I’m not going to finish anything. You can have parts of songs and sit on them for a while, but when you’re in the studio you have a finite amount of time and you have to get in and finish them. There’s an urgency and I kind of like that pressure. It forces you to make creative decisions on how this is going to turn out. So that’s how I went in. I love the fact that it’s a very eclectic record and that it draws from all of my influences. It takes you on a journey and that’s what records should do. I look at the record as a whole. What I feel when I hear this record is that I’m in a different place for every song. I get inside this place and then the next song comes and I’m in a different place and I really like that. It’s really interesting to go with the music and where it takes you."

Robinson noted that for tracks "Sleepwalker" and "Ides of Nowhere": "These were great examples of songs transforming from little ideas I originally had. Both just came alive when I had the band with me in the studio. They weren't anything like what I had first envisioned. It was exciting to experience that process."

Robinson spoke of "The Music That Will Lift Me," commenting: "I used the studio to specifically write that song. I had these parts written but it started to unfold once I got to Applehead Studios. I later wrote the lyrics in Nashville and it had really evolved into something special."

== Track listing ==
All tracks are written by Rich Robinson.

No.	Title	Length
1.	"The Upstairs Land"	3:15
2.	"Shipwreck"	3:58
3.	"The Music That Will Lift Me"	4:00
4.	"Everything's Alright"	5:49
5.	"Eclipse the Night"	3:27
6.	"Life"	4:43
7.	"Ides of Nowhere"	4:04
8.	"Time to Leave"	4:59
9.	"Astral"	4:52
10.	"For to Give"	4:15
11.	"Which Way Your Wind Blows"	6:20
12.	"Surrender"	4:26
13.	"Sleepwalker"	5:25
Total length:		57:33

== Credits ==
"The Upstairs Land":

- Rich Robinson: guitars, vocals
- Joe Magistro: drums, percussion
- Matt Slocum: keyboards
- Zak Gabbard: bass

"Shipwreck":

- Rich Robinson: guitars, vocals, bass
- Joe Magistro: drums, percussion
- Matt Slocum: keyboards

"Music That Will Lift Me":

- Rich Robinson: guitars, vocals, bass, percussion
- Chris Powell: drums
- Charlie Starr: guitar
- Danny Mitchell: keyboards

"Everything's Alright":

- Rich Robinson: guitars, vocals, bass, percussion
- Joe Magistro: drums, percussion
- Matt Slocum: keyboards
- Daniella Cotton: vocals

"Eclipse the Night":

- Rich Robinson: guitars, vocals, bass, percussion
- Joe Magistro: drums, percussion
- Matt Slocum: keyboards
- Marco Benevento: keyboards

"Life":

- Rich Robinson: guitars, vocals, bass, percussion
- Joe Magistro: drums, percussion
- Matt Slocum: keyboards

"Ides of Nowhere":

- Rich Robinson: guitars, vocals, bass, percussion
- Joe Magistro: drums, percussion
- Matt Slocum: keyboards
- Marco Benevento: keyboards

"Time to Leave":

- Rich Robinson: guitars, vocals, bass, drums, percussion
- Marco Benevento: keyboards

"Astral":

- Rich Robinson: guitars, vocals, bass, percussion
- Joe Magistro: drums, percussion
- Matt Slocum: keyboards

"For to Give":

- Rich Robinson: guitars, vocals, bass, percussion
- Joe Magistro: drums, percussion
- Matt Slocum: keyboards

Marco Benevento: keyboards John Hogg: vocals

"Which Way Your Winds Blows":

- Rich Robinson: guitars, vocals, bass, percussion
- Joe Magistro: drums, percussion
- Matt Slocum: keyboards

"Surrender":

- Rich Robinson: guitars, vocals, bass, percussion
- Joe Magistro: drums, percussion
- Marco Benevento: keyboards

"Sleepwalker":

- Rich Robinson: guitars, vocals, bass, percussion
- Joe Magistro: drums, percussion
- Marco Benevento: keyboards
- John Hogg: vocals
- Produced by: Rich Robinson
- Direction: John McDermott
- Engineered by: Chris Bittner
- Additional Engineering by: Nelson Hubbard (tracks 3, 6-8, 10, 13)
- Mixed by: Chris Bittner and Mike Birnbaum
- Mastered by: Chris Athens
- Recorded and mixed at Applehead Studios

== Charts ==
Chart (2016)	Peak position
Belgian Albums (Ultratop Flanders)	191
