= Weary and Wired =

Studio album by Marc Ford
- Released: March 27, 2007
- Genre: Blues-rock, Southern rock, jam rock
- Length: 61:36
- Label: Blues Bureau International
- Producer: Marc Ford; Anthony Arvizu, Mark Dutton (co-producers)

Marc Ford chronology
It's About Time (2003)	Weary and Wired (2007)	Marc Ford and the Neptune Blues Club (2008)

Professional ratings
Review scores
Source	Rating
Allmusic	link
Modern Guitars Magazine	link
NetRhythms	link

Weary and Wired is the second album by guitarist and singer-songwriter Marc Ford. The album was released on March 27, 2007, on the Blues Bureau International label.

== Track listing ==
All songs written by Marc Ford, except as indicated.

1. Featherweight Dreamland – 3:17
2. Don't Come Around – 3:43
3. It'll Be Over Soon – 3:07
4. Dirty Girl – 3:05
5. The Other Side (Ryan Bingham) – 2:53
6. 1000 Ways (Marc Ford, Elijah Ford) – 4:04
7. Smoke Signals (Marc Ford, Luther Russell) – 8:26
8. Greazy Chicken – 6:01
9. Currents – 6:04
10. Just Take the Money – 2:53
11. Medicine Time – 4:05
12. The Same Thing (Willie Dixon) – 8:44
13. Running Man Blues – 2:44
14. Bye Bye Suzy – 2:59
15. The Big Callback – 3:29

== Personnel ==
- Marc Ford – vocals, guitars, backing vocals, record producer
- Muddy (a.k.a. Mark Dutton) — bass guitar, backing vocals, co-producer
- Doni Gray – drums, backing vocals

=== Additional musicians ===
- Elijah Ford – bass guitar on "Featherweight Dreamland", 2nd guitar on "1000 Ways", backing vocals
- Mike Malone – Hammond organ, piano
- Afton – organ on "Smoke Signals"
- Aaron West – saxophone
- Will Artope – trumpet

=== Additional background vocals ===
Chris Lizotte, Kirsten Ford, Scott Owen, Joel Owen
