= The Steepwater Band =

American Rock Band

- Origin: Chicago, Illinois, US
- Genres: Rock, blues rock
- Years active: 1998–present
- Label: Diamond Day
- Members: Jeff Massey; Joe Winters; Eric Saylors; Joe Bishop
- Past members: Michael Connelly; Tod Bowers
- Website: www.steepwater.com

The Steepwater Band is an American rock band formed in Chicago in 1998 by the trio of Jeff Massey (guitars and vocals), Joe Winters (drums), and Tod Bowers (bass). The band took their name from a cargo vessel that Massey sighted in a port on Lake Michigan.

== History ==
=== 1998–2004 ===
Initially the band concentrated on playing their own versions of classic blues songs, particularly electric Chicago-style blues, and performed their first concert at Phyllis' Musical Inn in Chicago on October 29, 1998. The band quickly progressed from covering blues tunes to writing their own music. In 1999 the band met singer-songwriter Michael Connelly, who collaborated with them on their inaugural effort, the five-song EP Goin' Back Home. The Steepwater Band returned the favor by performing on Connelly's project, Bottles of Wine. Connelly officially joined The Steepwater Band in 2000.

The years of 1999 and 2000 saw the band performing frequently in Chicago and the surrounding region. On June 8, 2000, The Steepwater Band performed at their first Chicago Blues Festival, kicking off that year's event at noon.

The band released its first full-length album, Brother to the Snake, in 2001 with the support of radio station WXRT and Jim Beam to a packed house at Chicago's Double Door. During the year the band also released a live-in-the-studio album, Live...Half in the Bag.

The band continued to play in the Midwest in 2002 and 2003, often as an opening act. The band also signed a recording, management, and publishing deal with Funzalo Records/Mike's Artist Management during this period. This relationship resulted in the production of one album, Dharmakaya, which was recorded with producers Sean Slade and Paul Kolderie (Radiohead, Warren Zevon, the Pixies, Uncle Tupelo) in Boston and released on May 18, 2004. Connelly departed in October 2004, and the band and Funzalo/MAM ended their relationship in early 2005.

=== 2005–present ===
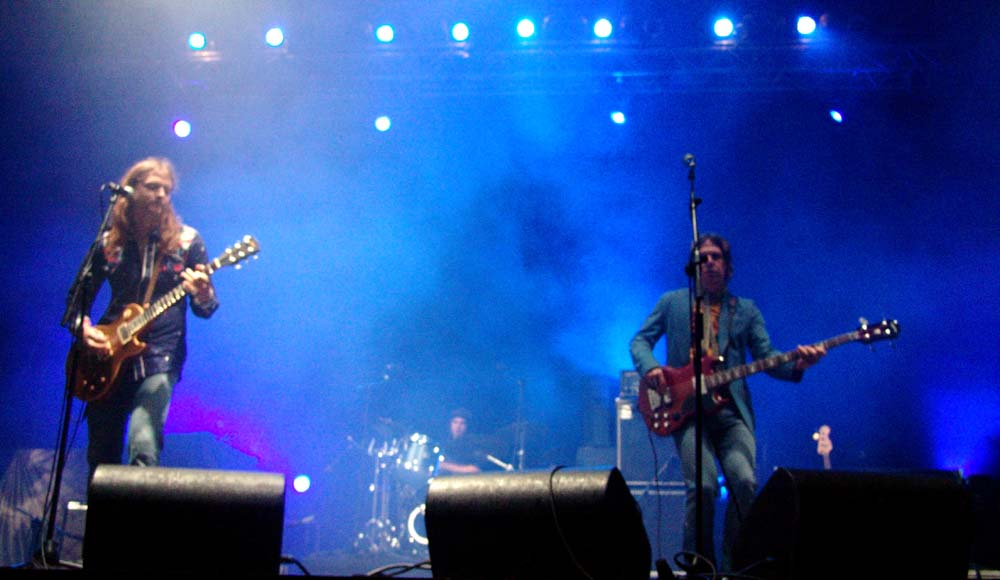
The Steepwater Band performing at the Azkena Rock Festival, September 1, 2005.

In April 2005 the band performed on television in Nashville, Tennessee, with Little Milton, who died a few months later. In June, for their fifth time playing the Chicago Blues Festival, they received a headlining slot on the Best Buy Showcase Stage. In September they performed their first European concert at the Azkena Rock Festival in Vitoria-Gasteiz, Spain. In addition to their own 70-minute set, they hosted a late-night jam session with members of the Drive-by Truckers and the Basque band The Soulbreaker Company. In November 2005, the band was invited by Chicago rock radio station WLUP to open for Bon Jovi at the sold-out United Center.

In 2006 the band performed at various festivals and concerts with Umphrey's McGee, Yonder Mountain String Band, Keller Williams, the Doobie Brothers, Ian Gillan (Deep Purple's vocalist), and Cheap Trick. The band's third full-length album, Revelation Sunday, was released on August 15, 2006 with a release concert held on August 11, 2006, at Chicago's Metro music venue. In September, the band headlined three concerts, with The Soulbreaker Company as the opening act, in Madrid, Bilbao, and Barcelona, Spain. Rick Richards, guitarist of The Georgia Satellites, joined the band on stage for three songs in Barcelona.

In January 2007, the band performed on the Gimme Three Days cruise with Lynyrd Skynyrd, 38 Special, American Minor, Tishamingo, Blackberry Smoke, and other blues-rock, Southern rock and country artists aboard the Carnival Cruise Lines Fascination. In its March issue, Vintage Guitar magazine published a full-page article/interview with band members. In July, the band returned to Europe for a tour of Spain and the Canary Islands. The tour began with a concert in Barcelona, Spain, on July 5 with Gov't Mule and John Mayall & the Bluesbreakers, and also included a date with long-time Black Crowes guitarist Marc Ford. In conjunction with the tour the band also released Songs From the Eighth Day, featuring covers of Neil Young's "Cortez the Killer", Bob Dylan's "Phantom Engineer", Big Bill Broonzy's "Key to the Highway", Robert Johnson's "Walkin' Blues", a live version of "Collision", and two new Steepwater Band songs.

In May 2008, the band recorded Grace and Melody at the Compound Studios in Long Beach, CA with producer Marc Ford. It was released on Diamond Day Records in November 2008 in the US and December 2008 in Europe.

In December 2009, the band announced a five-week tour of Europe, including a run with Marc Ford in Spain on the first ten dates. In early February 2010, the band embarked on a two-week tour with Gov't Mule, and shortly after began another five-week European tour. In September 2010, "The Stars Look Good Tonight", debuted on the FMQB AAA Top 200 Radio Chart at No. 165. In October 2010 Diamond Day Records released Live at the Double Door, recorded at a single show in May 2010. Clava was released August 16, 2011

In 2012, "Collision", off 2006's Revelation Sunday, appeared in the motion picture, One for the Money. Former Healing Sixes guitarist Eric Saylors joined as second guitar and backing vocalist.

== Band members ==
=== Current band members ===
- Jeff Massey (guitar and vocals)
- Joe Winters (drums)
- Eric Saylors (second guitar and vocals) (2012-)
- Joe Bishop (bass guitar) (2019-)

=== Former band members ===
- Michael Connelly (guitar and vocals) (2000-2004)
- Tod Bowers (bass guitar) (1998-2019)

== Discography ==
=== Studio albums ===
- 2001 - Brother to the Snake (US: Funzalo Records; Europe: Evangeline Records)
- 2004 - Dharmakaya (US: Funzalo Records; Europe: Evangeline Records; Canada: True North Records)
- 2006 - Revelation Sunday (US: Diamond Day Records; Europe: Evangeline Records)
- 2008 - Grace and Melody (Diamond Day Records)
- 2011 - Clava (Diamond Day Records)
- 2016 - Shake Your Faith (Diamond Day Records)
- 2020 - Turn of the Wheel (Diamond Day Records)
- 2022 - Return of the Wheel (Diamond Day Records)

=== Live albums ===
- 2001 - Live...Half in the Bag (Independent)
- 2010 - Live at the Double Door (Diamond Day Records)
- 2013 - Live & Humble (Diamond Day Records)

=== EP's/SP ===
- 2000 - Goin' Back Home EP (Independent)
- 2007 - Songs From the Eighth Day EP (Diamond Day Records)
- 2010 - The Stars Look Good Tonight - Single (Diamond Day Records)

=== Compilations ===
- 2014 - Diamond Days, Best of... (Sun Pedal Records)

=== DVDs ===
- 2008 - The Steepwater Band Live Concert DVD

== Film and television ==
- Major Motion Picture - One For The Money, featuring Katherine Heigl: used the song “Collision” ~ 2012
- Chicago Cubs Baseball (WGN Superstation): “The Stars Look Good Tonight” ~ 2010
- The television series Deadliest Catch used the song "Another Cold Letdown" 2010
- The television series Friday Night Lights used the song "Revelation Sunday" during a football game sequence in a 2007 episode (online and DVD versions).
- The Disney movie Invincible starring Mark Wahlberg contained the song "Autumn" off the band's 2004 release Dharmakaya.
- Nissan Motors has been using the song "Black Cat's Path", also from Dharmakaya, for a long-running national television advertising campaign (2004 - current) for their full-size Titan pick-up truck.
- The television sitcom My Name Is Earl has used the songs "Dead Horse" (Dharmakaya) and "Dirty Ol' Blues" (Brother to the Snake) in episodes.
