= Live at the Hollywood Bowl (Ben Harper video) =

Video by Ben Harper & the Innocent Criminals
- Released: 2003
- Recorded: August 4, 2003; Hollywood, California

Live at the Hollywood Bowl EP

EP by Ben Harper & the Innocent Criminals
- Released: November 13, 2003
- Recorded: August 4, 2003; Hollywood, California
- Label: Virgin

Live at the Hollywood Bowl is the first full-concert DVD by Ben Harper & the Innocent Criminals. Recorded August 4, 2003 in Hollywood, California, it features a 15-song show, along with several extra music videos that Harper recorded. Released alongside this DVD was an EP of four or seven songs from the event.

== DVD tracks ==
1. "Glory & Consequence"
2. "Excuse Me Mr."
3. "Brown Eyed Blues"
4. "Temporary Remedy"
5. "Gold to Me"
6. "Sexual Healing"
7. "Steal My Kisses"
8. "Diamonds on the Inside"
9. "Amen Omen"
10. "Burn One Down"
11. "With My Own Two Hands/War"
12. "Walk Away"
13. "Waiting on an Angel"
14. "Blessed to Be a Witness"
15. "Like a King/I'll Rise"

== EP tracks ==
1. "Brown Eyed Blues"
2. "With My Own Two Hands/War"
3. "Sexual Healing"
4. "Amen Omen"
- !!Bonus Material!!
1. "Walk Away"
2. "Excuse Me Mr."
3. "Temporary Remedy"

== Certifications ==
Region	Certification	Certified units/sales
Australia (ARIA)	Platinum	15,000^{^}
^{^} Shipments figures based on certification alone.
