= The Magpie Salute =

American rock band (2016–2019)

- Logo of The Magpie Salute

Background information
- Origin: United States
- Genres: Blues rock, hard rock, Southern rock
- Years active: 2016–2019
- Labels: Eagle, Provogue
- Members: Rich Robinson; Marc Ford; Sven Pipien; Matt Slocum; Joe Magistro; John Hogg
- Past members: See members section

The Magpie Salute was an American rock band formed in 2016 by guitarist Rich Robinson after the breakup of his group the Black Crowes. The band also includes former Black Crowes members Marc Ford and Sven Pipien, along with singer John Hogg of Moke as well as Matt Slocum and Joe Magistro who has worked with Robinson previously.

== History ==
The name The Magpie Salute comes from a superstition based in the UK... There are many variations, but the version I'm drawn to is the belief that if you see a Magpie, you would do well to salute it ‘to ward off negativity, or to have a good day.’ The way you salute the Magpie, based on some traditions is to say ‘Good Mornin’ Captain.’ The reason we salute is to show we’re unarmed, or what I like to say is ‘we come in peace.’ The Magpie falls within the Crowe umbrella of species, figuratively and literally. Magpies can be black and white which represents the light and the dark. I figured all of these things touch on many aspects of my life and this experience.

Rich Robinson announced the formation of the Magpie Salute in October 2016. In addition to Robinson, the group features UK singer John Hogg, former Black Crowes guitarist Marc Ford and bassist Sven Pipien, as well as keyboardist Matt Slocum, drummer Joe Magistro, and vocalists Adrien Reju and Katrine Ottosen from Robinson's solo band. John Hogg; songwriter and singer of Moke and songwriting partner on Robinsons’ Hookah Brown, was invited to support Rich on his 2015 tour in Europe and the UK. Hogg and Robinson picked up from where they left off with Magpie Salutes first single ‘Omission’, Hogg bringing a well crafted and soulful voice and his own London flavour to the lyrics. This announcement came on the heels of a series of shows Robinson performed earlier in 2016 in Woodstock, New York, where he was joined by Ford, Pipien and former Black Crowes keyboard player Eddie Harsch. Harsch was slated to tour as a member of the band until his sudden death in November 2016, and his appearance on their self-titled debut marks his last recording.

They performed their first concerts in January 2017 at the Gramercy Theatre in New York City. They were originally only scheduled to perform three concerts, but added a fourth show due to demand. They performed songs from the Black Crowes as well as Robinson and Ford's solo careers. The band then played a series of gigs in Europe in June and July 2017 before kicking off a 60 date US tour that included stops in San Francisco, Las Vegas and Morrison, Colorado (Red Rocks Amphitheater) and two nights at the Irving Plaza in New York. All attendees of the November 15 or 16 Irving Plaza shows received a limited edition live album featuring performances from throughout 2017.

The Magpie Salute released their debut studio album High Water I on August 10, 2018. The album debuted at #3 on Billboard's Heatseekers Chart, and #33 on the Top Album Sales chart. The band kicked off their 2018 tour, on July 1, at The Village at Copper Mountain in Colorado.

The band's second studio album High Water II was released October 11, 2019. Rating it four out of five stars for American Songwriter, critic Luke Levenson commented, "High Water II has a consistent quality, never veering too far off the boys' true sonic course, which starts and ends with the blues."

== Personnel ==
=== Past members ===
- Rich Robinson – guitar, vocals (2016–2019)
- Marc Ford – guitar, vocals (2016–2019)
- John Hogg – vocals, guitar, percussion (2016–2019)
- Sven Pipien – bass, backing vocals (2016–2019)
- Matt Slocum – keyboards (2016–2019)
- Joe Magistro – drums (2016–2019)
- Eddie Harsch – keyboards (2016; died 2016)
- Nico Bereciartua – guitar (2016–2017)
- Charity White – backing vocals (2017)
- Adrien Reju – backing vocals, mandolin (2017)
- Katrine Ottosen – backing vocals, harmonica (2017)

== Discography ==
Studio albums

- High Water I (2018)
- High Water II (2019)

Live albums

- The Magpie Salute (2017)
