= Rich Robinson =

American rock musician

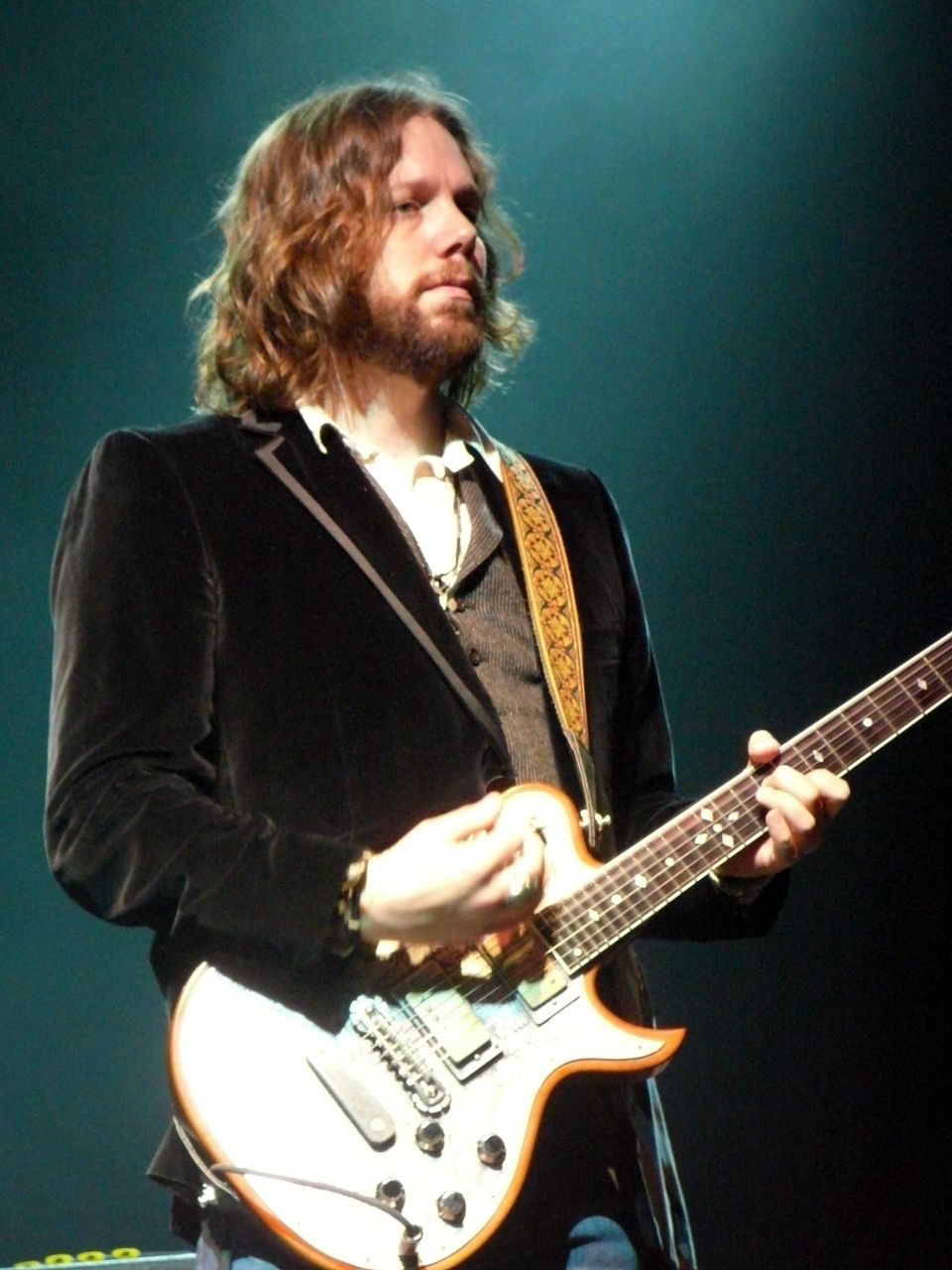
- Rich Robinson performing in 2008

Background information
- Born: May 24, 1969 (age 57); Atlanta, Georgia, United States
- Genres: Blues rock, hard rock, Southern rock
- Occupations: Musician, songwriter
- Instruments: Guitar, vocals
- Years active: 1984–present
- Website: Rich Robinson; The Black Crowes

Richard Robinson (born May 24, 1969) is an American musician and founding member of the rock and roll band the Black Crowes. Along with older brother Chris Robinson, Rich formed the band in 1984 (originally called Mr. Crowes Garden) while the two were attending Walton High School in Marietta, Georgia. At age 15, Rich wrote the music for "She Talks to Angels", which became one of the band's biggest hits.

== Biography ==
=== Early life ===
Robinson was born in Atlanta, Georgia, and grew up in the East Cobb County/Marietta suburbs of Atlanta. He is the son of Nancy Jane (née Bradley) and Stanley "Stan" Robinson. His father's single, "Boom-A-Dip-Dip", was No. 83 on the 1959 Billboard charts.

=== The Black Crowes ===
The first incarnation of what would become the Black Crowes appeared as early as 1984. The band were then named Mr. Crowe's Garden after a favorite childhood fairy tale. Robinson has stated that, because of his young age, he would have to sneak in and out of the venues in which they performed and would be refused admittance if he returned the next day to attend a gig himself.

By 1989, the band had become the Black Crowes and had gained momentum in their native Georgia. Producer George Drakoulias discovered the band during a New York City show the band gave that year, and had them signed to Rick Rubin's then newly formed Def American label. Recording sessions began almost immediately and the band's debut, $hake Your Money Maker, was released in 1990 to a wide charting success and good critical reception. Much of the album showcased the skills of then-21 years old Rich, from the opening riff of "Twice As Hard" to the melody of Mainstream Rock chart-topping hit "She Talks to Angels". The band quickly hit the road in support of the album, first with Aerosmith (1990), then with ZZ Top (1991). Having been fired from the latter for behavior issues, the band started its own tour in 1991.

The $hake Your Money Maker Tour was followed by the 1992 release of The Southern Harmony and Musical Companion. Departing from the more traditional rock & roll approach of their first album, the album featured more syncopated rhythms and generally longer songs (with three songs exceeding 6 minutes). The single Remedy reached No. 1 on the Billboard Album Rock Tracks chart in May 1992. Extensive touring, including headlining shows and festivals in Europe and Japan followed the release of the album, with the band appearing at the 1993 Pinkpop Festival.

Although the band's popularity never again reached the pinnacle of their first two albums, the Black Crowes established a loyal and steady following across the United States and, to a lesser extent, United Kingdom and continental Europe.

Amorica (1994) and Three Snakes and One Charm saw the band delving further into jam rock, before By Your Side returned to a more straightforward sound, more relating to Shake Your Money Maker while retaining musical elements developed since Amorica. After releasing Lions in 2001 and touring to support it, the Black Crowes took an indefinite hiatus.

=== Solo ===
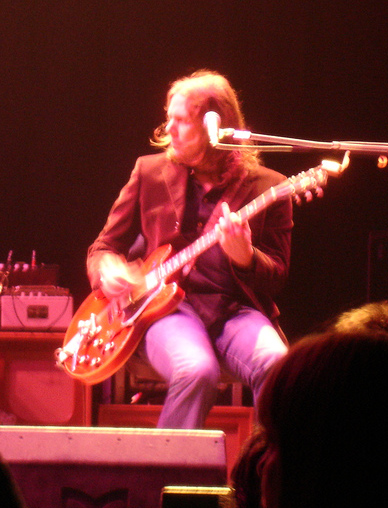
Robinson in Louisville, Kentucky in 2007, seated due an ankle injury

After the announcement of the band's hiatus, Rich formed a new outfit called Hookah Brown. The band (featuring John Hogg on vocals, bass, guitar and keyboards, Bill Dobrow on drums and Fionn O Lochlainn on bass, guitar, harmony vocals and electric piano) was an attempt to create a sound that was a little different from the Black Crowes. Robinson handled most of the songwriting, with Hogg contributing lyric and melody ideas to some material. After their debut gig at Arlene's Grocery in New York City, the band entered Globe Recording Studio in New York to record a few original tracks. Included on this demo were "Cut the World," "Know Me" and "Black Cloud," among several others.

After completing the demo sessions, Hookah Brown began touring clubs and other small venues throughout the United States. The gigs were well received and it appeared that the band was on the cusp of success, both commercially and critically. In April 2003, however, it was announced that Hookah Brown would be going their separate ways and that Robinson would be continuing as a solo act. The guitarist later revealed that the expense of operating a full band on tour, without the backing of a record label proved too much and forced the disbanding of Hookah Brown. Prior to this, John Hogg abruptly left Hookah Brown, followed by Fionn O Lochlainn and Bill Dobrow after a contract was presented to them by Robinson's New York lawyer.

Robinson continued to tour throughout the end of 2003 and well into 2004. His band featured a consistently rotating line-up, with drummer Bill Dobrow and bassist Gordie Johnson (ex-Big Sugar) being the only fairly regular faces. By August, Robinson had a full album of original material ready for release. Titled Paper, the record featured many new songs in addition to some reworkings of material from the Hookah Brown period. Robinson handled guitar, bass, and other instruments as well as taking over the lead vocals, with the gaps being filled in by Joe Magistro (drums), Eddie Harsch (keyboards), Donnie Herron (fiddle, violin) and his own son Taylor Robinson (percussion).

During breaks from touring with the Black Crowes, Robinson found time to assemble another band, Circle Sound, featuring Luther Dickinson (North Mississippi All-Stars), Bill Dobrow, Sven Pipien (The Black Crowes) and Rob Clores (The Black Crowes) in addition to himself; the band played a handful of gigs on the East Coast and were expected to perform again.

In 2009, Robinson performed in The People Speak, a documentary feature film that uses dramatic and musical performances of the letters, diaries, and speeches of everyday Americans, based on historian Howard Zinn's "A People's History of the United States”.

In addition, Robinson contributed to singer/songwriter Patti Smith's release Twelve, which was released in April 2007. He played dulcimer on "The Boy In the Bubble" and guitar on "Midnight Rider".

In late July 2011, three new tracks began streaming on Robinson's official Facebook page to coincide with the announcement of the release of his second solo record, Through a Crooked Sun, on October 11, 2011. Tour dates were announced via the same method in mid-August.

In late November, 2013, Robinson announced via his Facebook page that he had signed with independent record label The End Records, which would be releasing his third solo album, The Ceaseless Sight. In January, 2014, The End Records released a free sampler via Amazon MP3 that featured an alternate version of "One Road Hill," a track included on the forthcoming The Ceaseless Sight.

In 2016 Robinson joined Bad Company as a temporary, live substitute for guitarist Mick Ralphs on their 2016 US tour co-headlining with Joe Walsh.

In October 2016, Rich Robinson formed The Magpie Salute with other former Black Crowes members Marc Ford, Sven Pipien and Eddie Harsch. Their debut studio album, High Water I, was released on August 10, 2018.

=== Black Crowes reunited ===
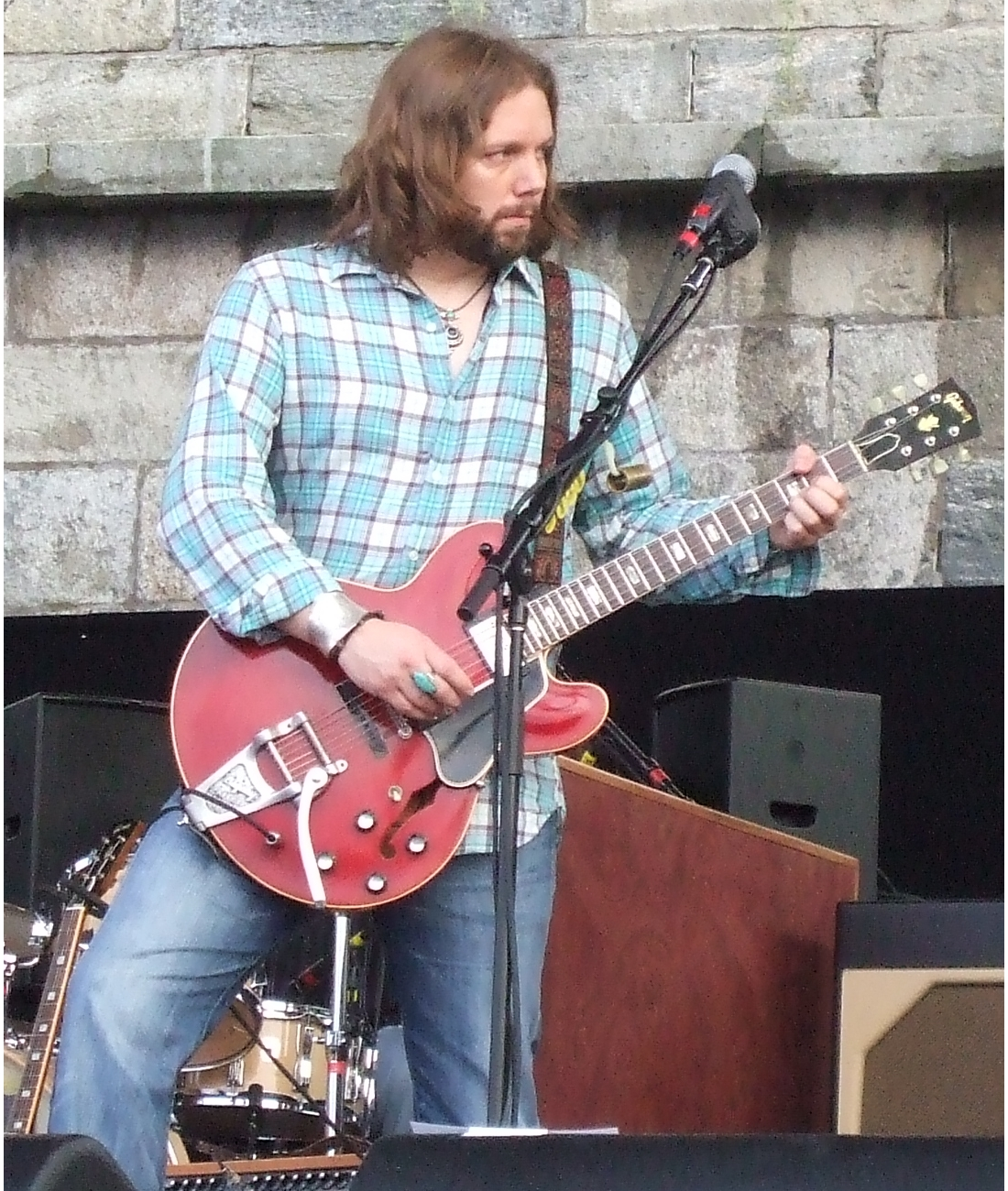
Robinson in Newport in 2008

In January 2005, Chris and Rich Robinson played an acoustic show together in Las Vegas, Nevada. It was the first time since the Black Crowes went on hiatus in 2002 that the two brothers had played together on the same stage. This and the reactivation of the band's website fueled rumors that the Black Crowes were re-uniting.

In March 2005, the Black Crowes officially went back on tour in Pittson, Pennsylvania at the Staircase Lounge. The tour included seven nights at the Hammerstein Ballroom in New York City and when the band came for a four night run at the Tabernacle in their home town of Atlanta, Georgia, the band's original drummer, Steve Gorman, returned to the band. The tour continued with many dates in the US and a couple in Canada.

In June, the band began opening for Tom Petty & The Heartbreakers and also played several music festivals including the Bonnaroo Music Festival. While still on tour with Tom Petty they started playing clubs on their own, and treating their audiences to two-set shows that were close to three hours long. In August they did a five night run at The Fillmore in San Francisco, which was filmed for the 2006 live CD/DVD entitled Freak 'n' Roll Into The Fog. The band also did two shows in Japan. The Crowes spent that northern fall doing two set-shows around the US including four nights at the Henry Fonda Music Box Theater in Los Angeles.

In November and December Chris took time off from the Crowes to tour with Phil Lesh and Friends on their Shadow of the Moon Winter Tour. He joined back up with the Crowes to finish out 2005 with three shows including a New Year's Eve show at Madison Square Garden in New York.

After a handful of shows in the States in March, the Black Crowes headed overseas to do three shows at Shepherd's Bush Empire in London, England, and three shows at the Paradiso in Amsterdam, the Netherlands.

Chris and Rich spent the month of April doing 13 acoustic shows. The tour was titled Brothers of a Feather and a CD and DVD from one of their three nights at the Roxy in Los Angeles during this tour was released in 2007. The Brothers played new material during their tour for the first time since the Black Crowes had reunited as well as playing each other's solo material together for the first time.

From here the brothers joined back up with the Crowes and headed to Canada for the month of May with openers Matt Mays and El Torpedo. They headed back to the States for a handful of two-set shows before heading out on a summer shed tour starting in June with the openers Robert Randolph and the Family Band and the Drive-By Truckers. They played mostly one-set shows although they did sneak in a few two-set club dates during the summer. The band continued to play a mix of songs from all of their albums, cover songs and a few new songs. This tour ended at Red Rocks in Morrison, Colorado, on August 12 and then an acoustic brothers' show in Boulder, CO, on August 13. Tickets to the show were given only to winners of a contest put on the band's message board.

Before the band returned to the road in the beginning of September, guitarist Marc Ford quit, and keyboardist Eddie Harsch was fired. They were replaced by Paul Stacey and Rob Clores, respectively. This tour ended November 8 at the Starland Ballroom in Sayreville, New Jersey.

During the winter and early spring of 2007, Robinson pulled together some friends to do two Circle Sound shows in New York. Both he and Chris did a handful of solo shows. In June, the Black Crowes headed back on tour doing one-set shows, sometimes with alternating openers including the Buffalo Killers and the North Mississippi Allstars. In July, Chris and Rich appeared on the Late Show with David Letterman and played an acoustic version of the song "Wiser Time".

At their August 3 show at the Musikfest in Bethelem, Pennsylvania, the band made another member change when keyboardist Rob Clores left the band and was replaced by Adam MacDougall. This tour ended in early November, with two shows at the United Palace Theater in New York, and two shows at the Electric Factory in Philadelphia, Pennsylvania.

On January 15, 2015, Robinson announced the final breakup of the band due to a disagreement with his brother over an alleged proposal regarding ownership of the band. In an interview, drummer Steve Gorman indicated that prior to the breakup, the Black Crowes had been discussing a tour.

On the November 11, 2019, Howard Stern Show, Chris and Rich announced that they were reuniting to tour, reprising their first studio album, Shake Your Money Maker.

== Influence and sound ==
Robinson was influenced by The Rolling Stones, The Allman Brothers Band, Crosby, Stills & Nash, Buffalo Springfield, The Faces, Cactus, Lynyrd Skynyrd, Neil Young, Captain Beyond, R.E.M., The Long Ryders, Led Zeppelin, John Fahey, and Nick Drake. Robinson often employs open G tuning in many of the Black Crowes’ songs and has also used open E, B♭, and G♭s. In Guitar World's "30 on 30: The Greatest Guitarists Picked by the Greatest Guitarists" (2010), Robinson picked Peter Green as his all-time favorite guitar player.

In June 2023, Robinson named "11 Guitarists that Shaped his Sound". The list consisted of: Stephen Stills, Angus and Malcolm Young, Peter Buck, Nick Drake, Clarence White, Keith Richards, Mick Taylor, Jimi Hendrix, Ronnie Wood, Jimmy Page, and Duane Allman.

== Discography ==
- Live At The Knitting Factory, NYC - 01/16/04 (Dynasonic, 2004)
- Paper (Keyhole Records, 2004)
- Brothers of a Feather: Live at the Roxy (Eagle Rock Entertainment, 2007) (with Chris Robinson)
- Through a Crooked Sun (Circle Sound/Thirty Tigers, 2011)
- Llama Blues EP (Circle Sound/Thirty Tigers, 2011)
- The Ceaseless Sight (The End Records/Circle Sound, 2014)
- The Dirigible Utopia EP (The End/Circle Sound, 2014)
- The Woodstock Sessions (Circle Sound, 2014)
- Flux (Eagle Rock Entertainment, 2016)
