= All Funked Up =

Studio album by Snafu
- Released: 1975
- Recorded: Summer 1975
- Studio: The Manor, Oxfordshire
- Genre: Funk rock; rhythm and blues
- Label: Capitol
- Producer: Bob Potter; Snafu

Snafu chronology
Situation Normal (1974)	All Funked Up (1975)

Professional ratings
Review scores
Source	Rating
AllMusic	2/5 stars
The Encyclopedia of Popular Music	2/5 stars
Sounds	3/5 stars

All Funked Up is the third album by British rock/R&B band Snafu, released on Capitol in 1975.

The band's line-up for this album included keyboardist Brian Chatton, who had previously played with the Warriors, Flaming Youth, and Jackson Heights.

== Critical reception ==
AllMusic called the album "a notable piece of mid-'70s British rock music [that] deserves to be released for collectors and fans alike." Hi-Fi News & Record Review wrote that it "proves to be their most cohesive [album] to date."

== Track listing ==
Side one
No.	Title	Writer(s)	Length
1.	"Don't Keep Me Wondering"	Gregg Allman
2.	"Bloodhound"	Micky Moody, Fuller
3.	"Lock and Key"	Bobby Harrison, Micky Moody, Peter Solley
4.	"Hard to Handle"	Otis Redding, Allen Jones, Al Bell
5.	"Every Little Bit Hurts""	Ed Cobb

Side two
No.	Title	Writer(s)	Length
6.	"Turn Around""	Brian Chatton
7.	"Deep Water"	Micky Moody, Fuller
8.	"Keep On Running"	Stevie Wonder
9.	"Bar Room Tan"	Micky Moody, Fuller
10.	"Dancing Feet"	Bobby Harrison, Brian Chatton

Re-released as Angel Air CD SJPCD032

== Personnel ==
=== Musicians ===
- Bobby Harrison - lead vocals
- Mel Collins - saxophone
- Micky Moody - guitar
- Brian Chatton - keyboards
- Tim Hinkley - piano, organ
- Colin Gibson - bass
- Terry Popple - drums, percussion
- Liza Strike, Viola Wills - backing vocals

=== Technical ===
- Bob Potter - producer, engineer
- Ian Vincentini - sleeve concept
- Philip Pace - front photography
- Mixed at Island Studios, London, Summer 1975.
