= Situation Normal =

Studio album by Snafu
- Released: 1974
- Recorded: Advision (basic backing tracks), Air London (vocals, final overdubs and mixes)
- Genre: Country rock
- Length: 37:18
- Label: WWA
- Producer: Steve Rowland

Snafu chronology
SNAFU (1973)	Situation Normal (1974)	All Funked Up (1975)

Situation Normal is the second studio album by SNAFU. Peter Solley's fiddle lends this album a curious Country and Western tone in places, unusual for what was essentially an R&B band. But the album still contains a short version of the classic "Lock and Key" with Micky Moody's distinctive slide guitar.

== Track listing ==
All tracks composed by Micky Moody, Peter Solley and Bobby Harrison

1. "No More"
2. "No Bitter Taste"
3. "Brown Eyed Beauty & The Blue Assed Fly"
4. "Lock and Key"
5. "Big Dog Lusty"
6. "Playboy Blues"
7. "Jessie Lee"
8. "Ragtime Roll"

== Personnel ==
- Bobby Harrison - lead vocals, congas
- Peter Solley - keyboards, synthesizer, fiddle
- Micky Moody - guitar, mandolin, harmonica
- Colin Gibson - bass, cowbell
- Terry Popple - drums, washboard

Horn section on "Ragtime Roll":

- Mel Collins - alto and tenor saxophones
- Steve Gregory - tenor saxophone
- Bud Beadle - baritone saxophone

=== Other personnel ===
- Martin Rushent - engineer
- Bill Price - overdub engineer
- Ashley Howe - vocals and final overdub engineer
- Martin Dean - photography
- Gregory Hodal - artwork
