= The Early Years (David Coverdale album) =

Compilation album by David Coverdale
- Released: 29 July 2003
- Recorded: Various
- Genre: Hard rock, blues-rock
- Length: 92:06
- Label: Purple
- Producer: Roger Glover

David Coverdale chronology
Into the Light (2000)	The Early Years (2003)	Into the Light: The Solo Albums (2024)

The Early Years is a double CD compilation album released in 2003 by David Coverdale of Deep Purple and Whitesnake, not to be confused with the Whitesnake compilation album The Early Years released in 2004. It contains his first two solo releases, White Snake, and Northwinds, released in 1977 and 1978, respectively. Both albums retain the bonus tracks found on the Spitfire reissues from 2000.

== Track listing ==
All songs written by David Coverdale and Micky Moody, except where indicated.

=== Disc one ===
==== White Snake ====
1. "Lady" - 3:48
2. "Blindman" (Coverdale) - 6:01
3. "Goldies Place" (Coverdale) - 5:03
4. "Whitesnake" - 4:22
5. "Time on My Side" - 4:26
6. "Peace Lovin' Man" (Coverdale) - 4:53
7. "Sunny Days" (Coverdale) - 3:31
8. "Hole in the Sky" (Coverdale) - 3:23
9. "Celebration" - 4:11
10. "Peace Lovin' Man" (Take 1) – 5:04
11. "Sunny Days" (Take 1) – 3:21

=== Disc two ===
==== Northwinds ====
1. "Keep on Giving Me Love" - 5:16
2. "Northwinds" (Coverdale) - 6:13
3. "Give Me Kindness" (Coverdale) - 4:34
4. "Time and Again" (Coverdale) - 4:02
5. "Queen of Hearts" - 5:16
6. "Only My Soul" (Coverdale) - 4:36
7. "Say You Love Me" (Coverdale) - 4:21
8. "Breakdown" - 5:15
9. "Shame the Devil" (Coverdale) - 3:35
10. "Sweet Mistreater" (Coverdale) - 3:45

== Personnel ==
Credits are adapted from the original album's liner notes.

Musicians (1977 White Snake)

- David Coverdale – lead vocals, piano, percussion
- Micky Moody – guitar, percussion, backing vocals
- Tim Hinkley – organ, percussion, vocals
- Ron Aspery – saxophone, baritone, tenor, alto, soprano, flute
- DeLisle Harper – bass, percussion, vocals
- Roger Glover – bass, melodica, ARP 2600 synthesizer, percussion, vocals
- Simon Phillips – drums, percussion
- Liza Strike – backing vocals
- Helen Chappelle – backing vocals
- Barry St. John – backing vocals

Musicians (1978 Northwinds)

- David Coverdale – lead vocals, piano; electric piano
- Micky Moody – guitars, backing vocals
- Tim Hinkley – keyboards, backing vocals
- Alan Spenner – bass
- Tony Newman – drums, percussion
- Roger Glover – synthesizer, clavinet, cowbell
- Graham Preskett – violin
- Lee Brilleaux – harmonica
- Ronnie James Dio – backing vocals
- Wendy Dio – backing vocals
