= Snafu (Snafu album) =

Studio album by Snafu
- Released: 1973
- Recorded: The Manor Studio, Oxfordshire
- Genre: Funk rock; rhythm and blues
- Length: 36:22
- Label: WWA
- Producer: Vic Smith

Snafu chronology
Snafu (1973)	Situation Normal (1974)

Snafu is the first album by Snafu. The album was issued on the short-lived WWA record label, founded in 1973 by Black Sabbath manager Patrick Meehan and was produced and engineered by Vic Smith.

"Drowning in the Sea of Love" had been released in the United States the previous year as a promo single by Capitol. In 1974 the track "Goodbye USA" was released as a single, b/w "Dixie Queen" (written by Peter Solley), on the Vertigo label in the Netherlands.

== Cover art ==
The cover art, including photography and the entire gate-fold sleeve inner, is by Roger Dean.

== Track listing ==
All tracks are written by R. L. Harrison and M. Moody, except where noted.

Side one
No.	Title	Writer(s)	Length
1.	"Long Gone"		5:18
2.	"Said He the Judge"	Harrison, Moody, Peter Solley	4:25
3.	"Monday Morning"		3:00
4.	"Drowning in the Sea of Love"	Kenneth Gamble, Leon Huff	5:39

Side two
No.	Title	Writer(s)	Length
5.	"Country Nest"	Harrison, Peter Solley	5:14
6.	"Funky Friend"		3.54
7.	"Goodbye USA"		4.25
8.	"That's the Song"	Peter Solley, Jerry Marcellino	4:27

== Musicians ==
- Bobby Harrison - lead vocals, percussion
- Micky Moody - guitars, backing vocals, mandolin
- Pete Solley - keyboards, backing vocals
- Colin Gibson - bass
- Terry Popple - drums
- (uncredited - fiddle)
- (uncredited - backing vocals)

== Other personnel ==
- Vic Smith - producer and engineer
- Malcom Koss - co-ordinator
- Roger Dean - photography and cover design
