= Brian Chatton =

- Born: Brian Charles Chatton; 19 July 1948 (age 78); Farnworth, Lancashire, England
- Genres: Progressive rock; rock
- Instruments: Keyboards; vocals
- Formerly of: The Warriors; Flaming Youth; Jackson Heights; Boys Don't Cry

Brian Charles Chatton (born 19 July 1948) is an English keyboardist, author and singer songwriter. He played with bands like the Warriors with singer Jon Anderson and then formed another group named Hickory with drummer and singer Phil Collins; Hickory later changed their name to Flaming Youth. Then he joined ex-bassist of The Nice, Lee Jackson, when the latter formed the second lineup of a band called Jackson Heights.

== Biography ==
=== Early years ===
Chatton was born in Farnworth, Lancashire, England. From 1950 to 1965, the family lived in Kearsley.

From 1961, Chatton was in The Three Jets with lead guitarist Barry Reynolds (b. 27 October 1949, Bolton, Lancashire, England) and drummer Johnny Pickup.

From November 1965 to 1967, Chatton was in the Warriors, with Jon Anderson on vocals, his brother Tony Anderson on vocals and harmonica, Rod Hill and Mike Brereton on guitars, Dave Foster on bass (later in Badger with ex-Yes keyboardist Tony Kaye) and future King Crimson drummer Ian Wallace. Jon would eventually join Yes. When Chatton and Anderson moved to London, Chatton met Phil Collins and they formed a band to back John Walker of The Walker Brothers. Leaving Walker, the pair formed their own band, Hickory, which then evolved into Flaming Youth.

=== 1970s ===
He played keyboards in Jackson Heights from their second album on. Around 1974, he was in Snafu for a short period, alongside Micky Moody and Colin Gibson. He appeared on their third album, All Funked Up, released 1975. He was on the first Rock Follies album in 1976. He joined a band put together by Chas Chandler (Animals) and backed Eric Burdon for 8 months, which included dates with both Santana, and Journey at Wembley Stadium. He also wrote the music for Eric's lyrics for a movie featuring Terence Stamp, called "Les Human." He did various sessions in London, playing with Ginger Baker. 3–5-year touring, recording and touring with John Miles band. Toured in America for first time. Roger Glover (Deep Purple) Mike Giles (King Crimson) Jack Green (Marc Bolan/Pretty Things) played on 4 of Jack's albums. Nico McBrain, Pat Travers, Iron Maiden, John Porter, Shep Pettibone (Producer – Pet Shop Boys)

In July 1979, Chatton joined Anderson, Allan Holdsworth, Jack Bruce and Adrian Tilbrook for a one-off performance in London as The All-Star Rock Band.

=== 1980s ===
He wrote "Take My Love and Run" for The Hollies, their last Polydor single, released in 1981. He also appeared with The Hollies when they promoted the single on TV. He wrote further material for the band's next album, What Goes Around.

He toured with Meatloaf in 1984.

He co-wrote the title track of Madness, Money & Music, Sheena Easton's third album.

In the 1980s, he was in Boys Don't Cry, who had a hit single with "I Wanna Be a Cowboy". They also included their own version of "Take My Love and Run" on certain versions of their first full-length album. They released three albums during the 80s and reformed to release new material in 2014.

=== Other work ===
He later collaborated on the Uzlot project with Jon Anderson. It stood for over 30 years and then material from this was re-worked and included on Anderson's 1000 Hands: Chapter One solo album, which was released in March 2019. He wrote 7 of the 11 songs, played some keyboards and sang some backing vocals. Guests on 1000 Hands playing Chatton's material included Chick Corea, Billy Cobham, Jean-Luc Ponty, Steve Howe, Alan White and Ian Anderson. He has also worked with B. B. King, Robin Gibb, Keith Emerson, Alan White, Brian Auger, Albert Lee. He has also written music for TV and many adverts.

=== Recent years ===
He now lives in California and self published his autobiography, Rolling with Rock Royalty, in 2020. Promotional work for the book also involves former Yes keyboardist, Tony Kaye. Charlotte and Emily Chatton are his daughters. from his first marriage. He currently resides in Marina del Rey with his second wife, Justine Estee, whom he met in Los Angeles in 2003. They have collaborated on over 20 songs together with Justine as his lyricist.

== Lists of collaborators ==
- B.B. King
- Phil Collins
- Meat Loaf+Neverland Express1985
- The Hollies
- Joe Cocker
- Albert Lee
- Jack Bruce
- Ginger Baker
- Keith Emerson
- Jon Anderson
- Tony Kaye
- Alan White
- Chris Squire
- Peter Frampton
- Ian Wallace
- Steve Holley
- Pauli Cerra
- Allan Holdsworth
- Levon Helm
- Laurence Juber
- Tim Bogert
- Raymond Gomez
- Kevin Eubanks (Tonight Show)
- Don Peake
- Carmine Appice
- Steve Lilliwhite
- Mel Collins
- Ian Paice
- Denny Laine
- Cozy Powell
- Robin Gibb
- Richie Blackmore
- Alvin Lee
- Barry Barlow
- Boz Burrell
- Mick Ralphs
- Chris DeBurgh
- Mo Foster
- BJ Cole
- Clive Bunker
- Julian Colbeck
- Deon Estus (Wham)
- Roger Glover (Deep Purple)
- Mike Giles (King Crimson)
- Jack Green (Marc Bolan/Pretty Things) played on 4 of Jack's albums.
- Dave Carlock (TUBES, Pink),
- Nico McBrain (Pat Travers, Iron Maiden)
- John Porter
- Shep Pettibone (Producer – Pet Shop Boys)
- Pat Travers (3 albums & live work)
- John Miles (Tina Turner, Joe Cocker)
- Mike Slamer
- Remo Packer (Session Musician)
- Chester Thompson (Genesis)
- Andy MacKay (Roxy Music)
- Lemmy
- Hans Zimmer
- Mike & Tim Franklyn (Bruce Hornsby, Joe Walsh)
- Danny Lehrman
- Rob Vukelich studio owner / engineer / producer Several solo projects + Uzlot with Jon Anderson
- John Altman
- James Zota Baker ( War / Edgar Winter / Amanda Haley )
- Irvin Magic Kramer (Ray Charles)
- Ted Springman (Tony Kaye)
- Scott Moyer (session musician)
- Clem Burke (Blondie)

== Discography ==
=== Solo ===
- Playing for Time (1981), as Chatton, with Phil Collins among others
- Spellbound (1989)
- Chatton Classic Covers – Chapter One (2000)
- Industrial Variety, library music

=== The Warriors ===
- Single :

- You Came Along/Don't Make Me Blue (1964)

- Albums :

- Bolton Club (2003)
- The Lost Demos (2020)

=== Flaming Youth ===
- Singles :

- Guide Me, Orion/From Now On (Immortal Invisible) (1969)
- Man, Woman And Child/Drifting (1969)
- From Now On (Immortal Invisible)/Space Child (1969)
- Guide me, Orion/Earthglow/Pulsar/From now on ( Immortal Invisible ) (1969)

- Album :

- Ark 2 (1969)

=== Jackson Heights ===
- The Fifth Avenue Bus (1972)
- Ragamuffin's Fool (1973)
- Bump 'n' Grind (1973)

=== Snafu ===
- All Funked Up (1975; CD reissue 2000)

=== Rock Follies ===
- Rock Follies (1976)

=== John Miles ===
- More Miles Per Hour (1979)
- Sympathy (1980)
- Miles High (1981)

=== Boys Don't Cry ===
- Don't Talk to Strangers (EP) (1983), before he was an official member
- Boys Don't Cry (1986)
- Who the Am Dam Do You Think We Am? (1987)
- White Punks on Rap (2009), with unreleased songs from 1983 to 1999
- Hear It Is (2014)

=== Sessions ===
- Andy Mackay, In Search of Eddie Riff (1974)
- Alan Hull, Squire (1975)
- Brian Parrish, Love on My Mind (1976)
- Pat Travers, Pat Travers (1976)
- Vapour Trails, Vapour Trails (1979)
- Jack Green, Humanesque (1980)
- Jack Green, Reverse Logic (1981)
- The Hollies, What Goes Around (1983)
- Keith Emerson, Best Revenge (1986)
- Pat Travers, Halfway to Somewhere (1995)
- Jon Anderson, 1000 Hands: Chapter One (2019)
