= The Young & Moody Band =

The Young & Moody Band was a British blues rock band from the late 1970s to the early 1980s, headed by Status Quo co-writer Bob Young and Whitesnake guitarist Micky Moody. The two met for the first time in 1975, when Moody's band, Snafu, supported Status Quo on tour. They formed a friendship and in their spare time began writing songs together. Over a period of several years, they collected enough material for two albums and several singles.

The band started under the name "Young & Moody", releasing a self-titled album on Magnet Records in 1977. Later they changed their name to The Young & Moody Band. Their 1981 single "Don't Do That" also featured Lemmy from Motörhead, Cozy Powell and The Nolans and charted at No. 63 on the UK Singles Chart.

Their follow-up single, "These Eyes", was used in a UK jeans commercial (c. 1981). Graham Bonnet (ex Rainbow) supplied the vocals (but not on the single) and the lyrics 'these eyes' were replaced with the word 'Levis'. Written by Young and Moody, it was sung by Ed Hamilton, who also wrote "Night Games" from Bonnet's third album Line-Up. Both tracks were available as singles on Bronze Records and featured on the compilation album A Quiet Night In. When released on that compilation album, it earned international gold discs.
