= Into the Light: The Solo Albums =

Box set by Whitesnake
- Released: 25 October 2024
- Recorded: 3–17, 25–30 August; 1–7 September 1976 (Mixing) (Whitesnake); 21 March–6 April 1977; 10–19 April 1976 (Northwinds) c. Late 1990s–2000 (Into the Light) c. 2020s (2024 Remix)
- Genres: Hard rock; blues rock
- Label: Rhino
- Producers: David Coverdale; Tom Gordon

Whitesnake chronology
The Purple Album: Special Gold Edition (2023)	Into the Light: The Solo Albums (2024)	Access All Areas: Live (2025)

David Coverdale chronology
The Early Years (2003)	Into the Light: The Solo Albums (2024)

Singles from Into the Light: The Solo Albums
- 1. "Midnight Blue (2024 Remix)" Released: 16 August 2024; 2. "Wherever You May Go (2024 Remix)" Released: 5 September 2024; 3. "Time & Again (Strings Version) (2024 Remix)" Released: 26 September 2024

Into the Light: The Solo Albums is a box set album by the English hard rock band Whitesnake, released worldwide by Rhino Records on 25 October 2024, followed by a Japanese release on 13 November. The box includes tracks from the solo albums of David Coverdale, the band's founder and-singer-songwriter: White Snake (1977), Northwinds (1978) and Into the Light (2000). Additionally, the collection features the "revisited, remixed and remastered" versions of the material from these solo albums.

Coverdale recorded White Snake and Northwinds after the dissolution of Deep Purple in 1976, before forming Whitesnake. Decades later, following Whitesnake's temporary hiatus, Coverdale resumed his solo career with Into the Light, exploring a more-reflective and blues-influenced sound. Since the initial release, the albums has been reworked: the tracks from White Snake and Northwinds were separated into their multitrack stems using artificial intelligence (AI) software to preparing for the subsequent remastering and remixing process, while Into the Light simply has been remixed from the existing masters.

== Background ==
Into the Light: The Solo Albums features the David Coverdale's solo albums and demo recordings; including his albums, White Snake (1977) and Northwinds (1978), released in-between his work with Deep Purple and Whitesnake, as well as his third solo album, Into the Light (2000), released after the dissolution of Whitesnake. Into the Light was commercially and critically his most-successful solo album, charting in six countries.

Both White Snake and Northwinds were produced by Roger Glover, while Into the Light was produced by Coverdale, while Doug Bossi, Bjorn Thorsrud, John X. Volaitis and Michael McIntyre were credited as associate producers.

In late 2000s, Coverdale considered restoring and remastering his early work, including his first two solo albums and material from Whitesnake, but at that time they could not be remixed due to the 2008 Universal Studios fire, which seemed to destroy the band's material belonging to Geffen Records. It was later revealed that some of the masters had been preserved at the Iron Mountain Storage Facility in Pennsylvania. In 2017, Coverdale signed a re-issue distribution deal with Rhino Entertainment and Warner Music Group. As part of the agreement, Rhino acquired the rights to all of Coverdale's Whitesnake albums. This was later expanded to Coverdale's solo material and his Deep Purple catalogue when he sold all of his rights and royalties to Round Hill Music in 2022 for $50 million.

== Production ==
Around 2019, Coverdale commissioned the audio engineers at "Hook City Studios" to start working on remastering his debut and sophomore albums, and soon after added his third album. They experimented with the Audioshake, the artificial intelligence software, separating the albums' tracks into individual multitrack stems and preparing them for further alteration and remixing. Tom Gordon was involved in the remixing process with all three albums, assisted by different personnel: Into the Light was co-remixed with Christopher Collier, who worked with the group since the late 2010s, while White Snake and Northwinds was co-remixed by Alex Breckenridge.

While working on the debut album, White Snake, the audio engineers were challenged by the presence of digital artifacts, which they addressed by overlaying enhanced versions of individual stems to reinforce the overall sound. However, they had limited control over the volume and tone, particularly with the lead and background vocals, as well as the original tracks' reverb, mitigating these issues by incorporating new remixes of the drums and revamping the guitars and bass through amplifiers to achieve an authentic, contemporary sound. When integrating new instruments, the tape speed appeared to be slightly inaccurate, and the team digitally corrected it to attune with the rest of the record. Upon completion, the team selected the best-available mixes for the band's judgement and approval.

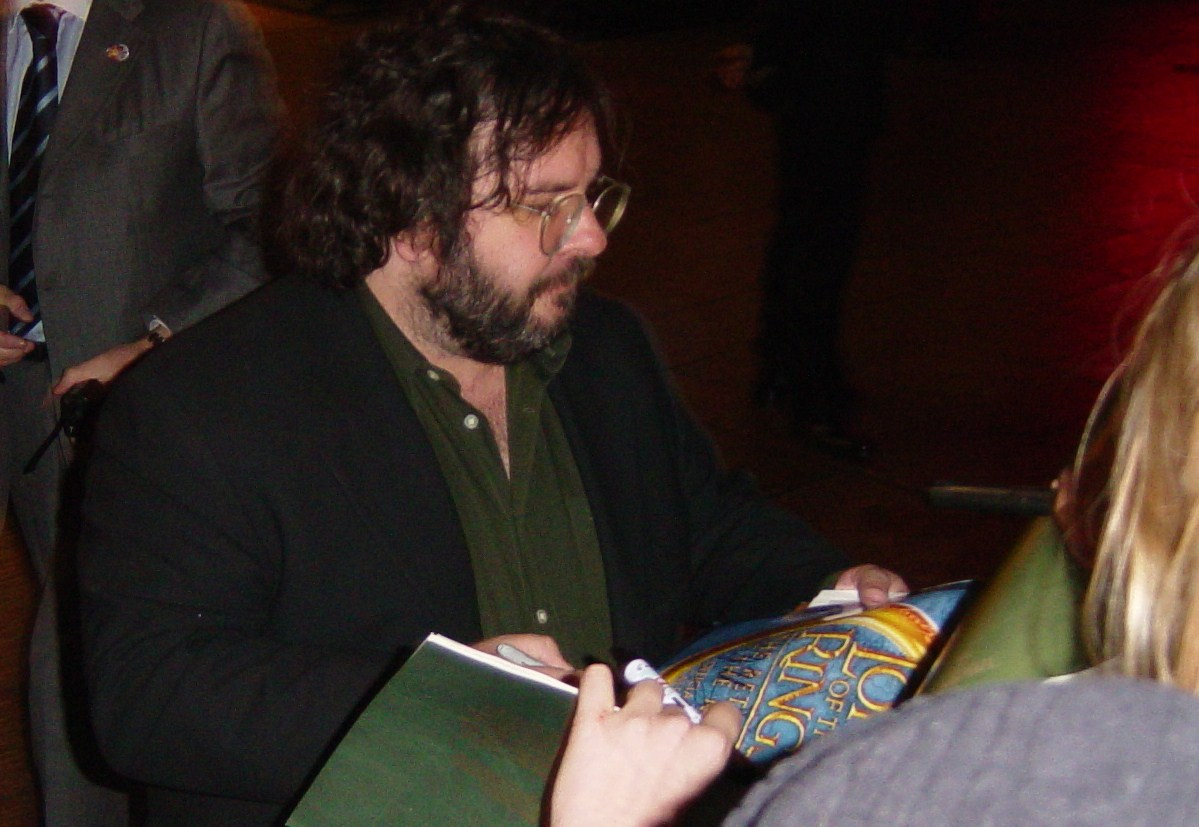
Peter Jackson (pictured in 2003) developed the MAL audio-separation software to enhance and restore the archived music and filmography of The Beatles. Tom Gordon expressed interest in utilising this technology, but his proposal was declined.

The remixing process for Northwinds was originally inspired by a neural network known as machine-assisted learning (MAL), which had been developed as an audio-restoration technology for the documentary The Beatles: Get Back (2021). (Note: MAL was originally named after the Beatles' former road manager, Mal Evans. This process was used to separate John Lennon's home-demo recording from the late 1970s, using a digital copy provided by Sean Lennon that was of higher quality than the third-generation source the three surviving members of The Beatles had used in 1995. This restoration cultivates in the release of "Now and Then" in late 2023 and the 2022 remix of Revolver.) Audio engineer and producer Tom Gordon, who was working on the remixes for Northwinds, was impressed by the restoration approach and contacted Peter Jackson's company WingNut Films, but Gordon's request was declined because the technology was exclusive to The Beatles project and was "bespoken for" at the time. Gordon then approached Paris Smaragdis in an attempt to develop a similar version of MAL software, but due to time constraints and limited resources, this was not possible. After the initial attempts with MAL failed, Gordon was under pressure to find alternative audio-isolation technology. When his next attempt with an open-source audio-separation software couldn't remove digital artifacts, including excessively exposed vocal, Gordon was introduced to "Audioshake", the audio-processing software employed to "unmix" Nina Simone's album. He deemed the unmixing results acceptable and proceeded working on Northwinds using Audioshake, starting with the song "Time & Again". During the original session for "Time & Again", Coverdale's vocals were recorded on the same multitrack as the Rhodes electric piano, and according to Gordon, Coverdale liked this version's vocals, but was "very unhappy with that keyboard performance". When revisiting the song, the engineers "ditched" the original keyboards, creating two remix versions featuring original vocals, as well as an updated piano part and string arrangements.

The studio album Into the Light was digitally recorded using Pro Tools into now-obsolete file format Sound Designer II, incompatible with modern systems. Several tracks from the record were later remixed and included in the compilation trilogy Red, White, Blues (released between 2020 and 2021). The engineering team transferred and converted the tracks using legacy equipment. To prevent data loss or corruption during the remixing project, the digital multitrack stems were re-aligned with their original time codes. Tom Gordon was involved in remixing all three albums, but with different personnels: Into the Light was remixed by Christopher Collier, who worked with the group since the late 2010s, while White Snake and Northwinds was remixed by Alex Breckenridge.

The box set includes several unreleased songs from the Into the Light sessions, which later released on the subsequent compilation albums, including the songs "As Long as I Have You", "Yours for the Asking", "With All of My Heart", "Let's Talk It Over" and "All the Time in the World". "As Long as I Have You" was released as an alternative mix on Whitesnake's 2006 Geffen Records compilation Gold. "All the Time in the World" appears in the 2018 Unzipped standard compilation. "Yours for the Asking", "With All of My Heart" and "Let's Talk It Over" appeared as a part of the Red, White, Blues trilogy series, featured on the 2020 remix compilation album Love Songs. Moreover, the disc two and four tracks contain demos spanning from 1968 to 1997. Some of these demos, "I Will Love You" and "It Would Be Nice", were re-recorded, again appearing in the Unzipped compilation expanded box set. "Crazy 'Bout Cha" is a rendition of the song "Whipping Boy Blues", featured on the band's 2011 album Forevermore. Additionally, "Lay Your Love On Me", a demo version of "Lay Down Your Love", appears in the 2008 album Good to Be Bad.

== Release and promotion ==
On 16 August 2024, Coverdale announced the upcoming box set on his Twitter/X page. That same day, a promotional music video for the song "Midnight Blue" from Into the Light was also released. Into the Light: The Solo Albums was released via Rhino Entertainment licenced through the band's label, Saltburn, LLC. on 25 October 2024 internationally. In Japan, the compilation was slated for its release on 6 November, but it was moved to 13 November. The physical version features a multi-disc box set containing remastered and remixed versions of the solo albums, and previously unreleased demos. The collection also includes music videos and a 60-page booklet containing photographs and an interview with Coverdale. The set was also released as a double LP that includes tracks from Into the Light, marking its first release on vinyl. The 2024 remixes of White Snake and Northwinds were also reissued on translucent vinyl LPs.

Although Coverdale recorded White Snake, Northwinds and Into the Light as a solo artist, he has been regarding them as Whitesnake albums. He stated: "As I'm recognized as 'Mr. Whitesnake', I thought, Why not? They're all Whitesnake albums to me ... we've remixed them to stand proudly alongside any Whitesnake album." Coverdale's first solo work within Whitesnake appears on the group's first release Snakebite, as a double EP format, featuring four tracks from Northwinds: "Keep on Giving Me Love", "Queen of Hearts", "Only My Soul" and "Breakdown".

Before the release, the snippets of the remixed tracks "Lady" and "Northwinds" were teased on social media. On 5 September 2024, a remixed version of "Wherever You May Go" was premiered, followed by another promotional music video of the song. "Time & Again" was released on 26 September with a promotional video featuring "Hook City Strings" arrangements and a piano version featuring Jeff DePaoli. The unboxing of the box set was premiered on 17 October, followed by a video release of "River Song" on 23 October. "Love Is Blind" was added into the set, featuring a music video recorded in the early 2000s and a modern remix. Music videos for "Yours for the Asking" and "She Give Me" were uploaded; these were followed by a video for "Too Many Tears", which has a different production style than the version from Restless Heart.

As of February 2026, the compilation has been removed from various streaming platforms except YouTube. This was reflected as the majority of the Whitesnake's catalogue have been transferred to Craft Recordings. It briefly returned to music streaming services on 16 July before its variant was digitally released by Craft on 14 August.

=== Commercial performance ===
Into the Light: The Solo Albums charted at number 14 on the UK Rock & Metal chart, and at number 98 on the Scottish Albums chart. It also charted at number 90 in Switzerland. On the first week of release, it has sold 775 copies in the US.

== Track listing ==
All tracks are written by David Coverdale, except where noted.

Disc one: Into the Light (2024 Remix)
No.	Title	Writer(s)	Length
1.	"She Give Me"		4:12
2.	"River Song"		6:42
3.	"Don't You Cry"		5:28
4.	"Love Is Blind"	Coverdale, Earl Slick	5:44
5.	"Slave"	Coverdale, Slick	4:52
6.	"Cry for Love"	Coverdale, Doug Bossi, Slick	5:34
7.	"Living on Love"	Coverdale, Bossi, Slick	6:09
8.	"Midnight Blue"	Coverdale, Slick	4:47
9.	"Too Many Tears"	Coverdale, Adrian Vandenberg	6:07
10.	"Don't Lie to Me"	Coverdale, Slick	4:42
11.	"All the Time in the World"		5:27
12.	"Wherever You May Go"		3:57
13.	"Yours for the Asking"		4:26
14.	"Let's Talk It Over"		8:12
Total length:			76:19

Disc two: Into the Light (Additional Remixes)
No.	Title	Writer(s)	Length
1.	"Love Is Blind (Band Version)"	Coverdale, Slick	5:26
2.	"As Long as I Have You"	Coverdale, Slick	4:03
3.	"With All of My Heart"		5:36
4.	"Wherever You May Go (Strings Version)"	Coverdale, Slick	1:14
5.	"Love Is Blind (Strings Version)"	Coverdale, Slick	3:31

Disc two: Demos & Unfinished Symphonies (featuring Tony Franklin)
No.	Title	Length
6.	"Lust"	3:39
7.	"Oh No! Not the Blues Again"	3:30
8.	"Into the Light" (intro)	1:04
9.	"Into the Light"	4:02
10.	"You Make It Hard on Me"	3:56
11.	"Would You Be Happy"	4:20
12.	"Fooling Yourself"	3:58
13.	"Make The Best Of It"	4:28
14.	"Veda of Cassandra Blues"	4:11
15.	"I Can See the Light"	4:01
16.	"Another Fallen Angel"	4:15
17.	"Itchy Finger"	4:52

Disc two: Original 1997 David Coverdale demos
No.	Title	Length
18.	"Crazy 'Bout Cha" (Original version of "Whipping Boy Blues")	4:27
19.	"If You Want Me"	4:21
20.	"Lay Your Love On Me" (Original version of "Lay Down Your Love")	4:10
Total length:		81:54

Disc three: Northwinds (2024 Remix)
No.	Title	Writer(s)	Length
1.	"Keep On Giving Me Love"	Coverdale, Micky Moody	5:08
2.	"Sweet Mistreater"		3:26
3.	"Northwinds"		6:01
4.	"Give Me Kindness"		4:32
5.	"Queen of Hearts"	Coverdale, Moody	5:15
6.	"Only My Soul"		4:06
7.	"Time & Again" (Strings version)		4:02
8.	"Say You Love Me"		4:18
9.	"Shame the Devil, Tell the Truth"		3:35
10.	"Breakdown"	Coverdale, Moody	5:12
11.	"Time & Again" (Piano version)		4:02
12.	"Time & Again" (Strings only)		4:01
Total length:			53:50

Disc four: White Snake MCMLXXVII (2024 Remix)
No.	Title	Writer(s)	Length
1.	"Lady"	Coverdale, Moody	3:46
2.	"Blindman"		5:36
3.	"Goldies Place"		4:40
4.	"Time On My Side"	Coverdale, Moody	4:24
5.	"Peace Lovin' Man"		4:43
6.	"Sunny Days"		3:59
7.	"Hole in the Sky"		3:58
8.	"Whitesnake"	Coverdale, Moody	4:19
9.	"Celebration"	Coverdale, Moody	3:42

Disc four: Young Lad's Blues (David Coverdale's 1968 Home Demos)
No.	Title	Length
10.	"Sunny Days"	4:59
11.	"Love Me In the Morning"	2:32
12.	"I Will Love You"	3:26
13.	"Moment In Time"	3:12
14.	"It Would Be Nice"	2:41
15.	"There Was a Time"	2:56
16.	"Why?"	4:04
17.	"I Still Love You"	1:20
Total length:		71:12

Disc five: Into the Light (2024 Remaster)
No.	Title	Writer(s)	Length
1.	"She Give Me"		4:12
2.	"River Song"		7:17
3.	"Don't You Cry"		5:50
4.	"Love Is Blind"	Coverdale, Slick	5:45
5.	"Slave"	Coverdale, Slick	4:53
6.	"Cry for Love"	Coverdale, Bossi, Slick	4:53
7.	"Living on Love"	Coverdale, Bossi, Slick	6:34
8.	"Midnight Blue"	Coverdale, Slick	4:57
9.	"Too Many Tears"	Coverdale, Vandenberg	5:59
10.	"Don't Lie to Me"	Coverdale, Slick	4:44
11.	"Wherever You May Go"		4:00
Total length:			52:20

Disc six: White Snake (2024 Remaster)
No.	Title	Writer(s)	Length
1.	"Lady"	Coverdale, Moody	3:44
2.	"Blindman"		6:00
3.	"Goldies Place"		5:00
4.	"Time On My Side"	Coverdale, Moody	4:24
5.	"Peace Lovin' Man"		4:49
6.	"Sunny Days"		3:27
7.	"Hole in the Sky"		3:20
8.	"Whitesnake"	Coverdale, Moody	4:20
9.	"Celebration"	Coverdale, Moody	4:04

Disc six: Northwinds (2024 Remaster)
No.	Title	Writer(s)	Length
1.	"Keep On Giving Me Love"	Coverdale, Moody	5:15
2.	"Northwinds"		6:04
3.	"Give Me Kindness"		4:33
4.	"Time & Again"		3:56
5.	"Queen of Hearts"	Coverdale, Moody	5:13
6.	"Only My Soul"		4:34
7.	"Say You Love Me"		4:19
8.	"Breakdown"	Coverdale, Moody	5:13
Total length:			78:15

== Personnel ==
Credits are adapted from the original albums' liner notes, including White Snake, Northwinds and Into the Light.

Musicians (1977 White Snake)

- David Coverdale – lead vocals, piano, percussion
- Micky Moody – guitar, percussion, backing vocals
- Tim Hinkley – organ, percussion, backing vocals
- Ron Aspery – saxophone, baritone, tenor, alto, soprano, flute
- DeLisle Harper – bass, percussion, backing vocals
- Roger Glover – bass, melodica, ARP 2600 synthesizer, percussion, backing vocals
- Simon Phillips – drums, percussion
- Liza Strike – backing vocals
- Helen Chappelle – backing vocals
- Barry St. John – backing vocals
- Alex Breckenridge – bass, keyboards, guitar (2024 remix)
- Tom Gordon – percussion (2024 remix)

Musicians (1978 Northwinds)

- David Coverdale – lead vocals, piano (CD3: 3); electric piano (CD3: 4, 7, and 11–12)
- Micky Moody – guitars, backing vocals
- Tim Hinkley – keyboards, backing vocals
- Alan Spenner – bass
- Tony Newman – drums, percussion
- Roger Glover – synthesizer, clavinet, cowbell
- Graham Preskett – violin
- Lee Brilleaux – harmonica (CD3: 1)
- Ronnie James Dio – backing vocals (CD3: 4)
- Wendy Dio – backing vocals (CD3: 4)
- Alex Breckenridge – guitar, bass (2024 remix)
- Tom Gordon – percussion (2024 remix)
- Jeff Depaoli – piano, string arrangement (2024 remix)
- Ruth Lenz – violin (2024 remix)
- Olga Archdekin – violin (2024 remix)
- Virginia Evans – viola (2024 remix)
- Luciana Gallo – cello (2024 remix)

Musicians (2000 Into the Light)

- David Coverdale – lead vocals; guitar (CD1: 6), string arrangements (CD1: 4), shaker (CD1: 1, 2, 4 and 6)
- Doug Bossi – guitar; backing vocals (except CD1: 12)
- Denny Carmassi – drums (except CD1: 12)
- Earl Slick – guitar (except CD1: 12)
- Reeves Gabrels – guitar (CD1: 1)
- Dylan Vaughan – guitar (CD1: 3)
- Danny Saber – guitar, bass (CD1: 1)
- Marco Mendoza – bass (except CD1: 3 and 12), backing vocals (CD1: 2–3, 5–11), Spanish guitar (CD1: 12)
- Tony Franklin – bass (CD1: 3)
- Mike Finnigan – organ (CD1: 2–5 and 7–9), piano (CD1: 6, 8)
- Derek Hilland – keyboards (CD1: 7)
- John X. Volaitis – keyboards (CD1: 1, 3, 9–10 and 12), vocals (CD1: 3 and 10), percussion (CD1: 1)
- Linda Rowberry – vocals (CD1: 12)
- James Sitterly – strings (CD1: 4)
- Ruy Folguera – string arrangements (CD1: 4)
- Jimmy Z – harmonica (CD1: 6)
- Bjorn Thorsrud – tambourine (CD1: 3), sound effects (CD1: 12)
- Jasper Coverdale – shaker (CD1: 2, 4 and 6)

2024 Box Set Credits

- David Coverdale – executive producer
- Tom Gordon – producer, remixing
- Alex Breckenridge – engineer, remixing (Whitesnake, North Winds)
- Aiden Melendez – A.I. audio restoration
- Christopher Collier – remixing (Into the Light)
- Hugh Gilmour – A&R, release coordination, art direction, liner notes, interviewer
- Scott Hull – remastering
- Rob Gross – product manager
- Susanne Savage – A&R administration
- Kristin Attaway – packaging manager
- Eric Bello – packaging manager (LP for White Snake, Northwinds)
- Matthew Taoinio – packaging manager (LP for Into the Light)
- Dorthy Stefanski – project assistance, editorial assistance
- Sam Stone – project assistance, editorial assistance

== Charts ==
Chart (2024)	Peak position
Swiss Albums (Schweizer Hitparade)	90
Scottish Albums (Official Charts)	98
UK Rock & Metal Albums (Official Charts)	14

== Release history ==
Release formats for Into the Light: The Solo Albums
Region	Date	Label	Format	Ref.
Various	25 October 2024	Rhino	LP; CD; box set; digital download; streaming	(Note: The compilation was pulled out from streaming platforms in February 2026 before it briefly returned on 16 July, but it was once again removed entirely in October.)
Japan	13 November 2024	Rhino	LP; box set; CD	
Various	14 August 2026	Craft Recordings	Digital download; streaming	
