= Nick Richards (singer-songwriter) =

British musician (born 1960)

- Born: Nicholas Richards; 1960 (age 65–66)
- Genres: Synth-pop; new wave
- Occupations: Singer-songwriter; record producer
- Instruments: Vocals; keyboards
- Years active: 1978–present
- Labels: Ember; RCA
- Member of: Boys Don't Cry

Nicholas Richards (born 1960) is a British singer-songwriter and record producer, best known as frontman of 1980s synth-pop and new wave band Boys Don't Cry.

== History ==
As a solo artist, Nikki Richards, aged 18, released the singles "If I Could Tell the World" and "I Wonder What You're Doing Tonight" on Ember Records in 1978, both singles being included on his debut solo album I Wonder What You're Doing Tonight. While the album itself was apparently not released in America, a third single from it, "Dance", did see a US release the same year. An additional non-album single, "Oh Boy!", written by Brian Wade and produced by Alan Winstanley, followed in 1979. Richards then moved to RCA Records for three more singles in 1980: "Tokyo Rising", "Factory Girl" and "Hot Love", all of which appeared on his self-titled follow-up album, released the following year.

In 1983, he became known as Nick Richards, and bought the Maison Rouge Recording Studios in London, where he put together the band Boys Don't Cry, remembered for their 1986 hit, "I Wanna Be a Cowboy". Boys Don't Cry re-recorded some of Richards' songs from his solo career, including "Josephine", which first appeared on his self-titled second album.

== Personal life ==
Richards has been married to his wife, Debbie, since the mid-1980s and they have seven children. The Richards family currently resides in the UK.

== Solo discography ==
=== Albums ===
- I Wonder What You're Doing Tonight (1978)
- Nikki Richards (1981)

=== Singles ===
- "Dance" (1978) [US only]
- "If I Could Tell the World" (1978)
- "I Wonder What You're Doing Tonight" (1978)
- "Oh Boy!" (1979)
- "Tokyo Rising" (1980)
- "Factory Girl" (1980)
- "Hot Love" (1980)
- "Back to School" (1981)
