= White Snake (album) =

Studio album by David Coverdale
- Released: 22 February 1977
- Recorded: August–September 1976
- Studio: Kingsway, London, England; Musicland, Munich, Germany
- Genre: Blues rock, hard rock
- Length: 38:18
- Label: Purple
- Producer: Roger Glover

David Coverdale chronology
White Snake (1977)	Northwinds (1978)

Alternative Cover (2000)

Alternative Cover (2024)

Singles from White Snake
- 1. "Hole in the Sky" Released: 6 May 1977 (UK); 2. "Whitesnake" Released: May 1977 (Japan); 3. "Lady" Released: 1977 (AUS)

Professional ratings
Review scores
Source	Rating
AllMusic	2/5 stars
Record Mirror	4/5 stars

White Snake is the debut solo album by David Coverdale, released on 22 February 1977 in Japan and on 6 May in Europe through Purple Records. Coverdale would use the album title as the name of his future band, first known as "David Coverdale's Whitesnake" and then shortened to Whitesnake. The album was released as a part of a compilation album Whitesnake/Northwinds in 1988, reissued alone in 2000, and re-released as part of a double compilation album later titled The Early Days (2003).

It was reissued in Into the Light: The Solo Albums, with all of Coverdale's solo albums, re-mixed (as a Whitesnake compilation), via Rhino Entertainment on 25 October 2024.

== Background and writing ==
As his first solo effort, Coverdale later admitted: "It's very difficult to think back and talk sensible about the first album. White Snake had been a very inward looking, reflective and low-key affair in many ways, written and recorded as it was in the aftermath of the collapse of Deep Purple".

== Reception ==
The album received mixed reviews. Bret Adams of AllMusic gave it 2/5 stars, considering it "a tentative, generally disappointing album because Coverdale is clearly flummoxed regarding the direction the music should take", mixing blues rock, R&B and soul music, with the track "Blindman" as "the best song because of its blues-rock purity" and sounds "ultimately, future Whitesnake". Richie Unterberger gave 3/5 stars to the 1988 double compilation, concluding "they're mediocre listening, the product of a man uncertain about where to take his music as a solo act, without the rock-hard hard rock support of one of his steady bands".

Victor Valdivia writing for PopMatters a 6/10 review about both 70s albums states it is from a pre-late 80s period image when Coverdale "was considered a talented singer with a bluesy voice far more reminiscent of Bad Company's Paul Rodgers than Zep's Robert Plant" and the album sounds "absolutely nothing like Led Zeppelin. Not only is Coverdale's voice much lower and bluesier than it would be in later years, but the music meanders all over the place, from horn-driven funk and R&B, to jazzy piano noodling and a more compact style of hard rock than he would ever try in his career's later incarnations", highlighting tracks "Whitesnake" and "Celebration", but also "badly dated" production.

Neil Jeffries in 2021 Classic Rock retrospective included the album as 7th out of 20 on a list of Coverdale-Whitesnake's best albums, saying "with a lazy, bar-room style, a bit of brass and ace backing singers, this is David Coverdale as few have heard him ... had "Hole In The Sky" (a ballad built on Tim Hinkley's piano) provided Coverdale with a hit, he might well have sailed off into Frankie Miller/Joe Cocker territory without a second thought about asking anyone to lie down or let him slide it in".

== Release and promotion ==
White Snake was reissued on Whitesnake's compilation box-set featuring Coverdale's proceeding solo albums titled Into the Light: The Solo Albums by Rhino Entertainment on 25 October 2024 as a multi-disc box set, including remixed and remastered versions of the album.

== Track listing ==
All tracks are written by David Coverdale, except where noted.

Side one
No.	Title	Writer(s)	Length
1.	"Lady"	David Coverdale, Micky Moody	3:48
2.	"Blindman"		6:01
3.	"Goldies Place"		5:03
4.	"Whitesnake"	Coverdale, Moody	4:22

Side two
No.	Title	Writer(s)	Length
5.	"Time on My Side"	Coverdale, Moody	4:26
6.	"Peace Lovin' Man"		4:53
7.	"Sunny Days"		3:31
8.	"Hole in the Sky"		3:23
9.	"Celebration"	Coverdale, Moody	4:11

2000 remastered bonus tracks
No.	Title	Length
10.	"Peace Lovin' Man" (Take 1)	5:04
11.	"Sunny Days" (Take 1)	3:21

== Personnel ==
- David Coverdale – vocals, piano, percussion
- Micky Moody – guitars, percussion, vocals
- Tim Hinkley – organ, vocals
- Ron Aspery – saxophone (baritone, tenor, alto, and soprano), flute
- DeLisle Harper – bass, vocals
- Roger Glover – bass, melodica, ARP 2600 synthesizer, percussion, vocals, production
- Simon Phillips – drums, percussion
- Liza Strike, Helen Chappelle, Barry St. John – vocals

== Miscellaneous ==
- Blindman was later re-recorded by Whitesnake in 1980, for their album Ready an' Willing.

== Charts ==
Chart (1977)	Peak position
Australian (Kent Music Report)	98
