= Northwinds =

Studio album by David Coverdale
- Released: 10 March 1978
- Recorded: 21 March–19 April 1977
- Studio: AIR Studios, London, UK
- Genre: Blues rock, hard rock
- Length: 38:53
- Label: Purple (UK); Polydor (Japan)
- Producer: Roger Glover

David Coverdale chronology
White Snake (1977)	Northwinds (1978)	Snakebite (1978)

Alternative cover
- 2000 CD reissue

Singles from Northwinds
- 1. "Breakdown" Released: 24 February 1978

Professional ratings
Review scores
Source	Rating
AllMusic	3/5 stars

Northwinds is the second solo album by former Deep Purple singer David Coverdale, released by Purple and EMI on 10 March 1978. In Japan, it was released through Purple's Japanese distributor, Polydor. It was produced by former Deep Purple bassist Roger Glover as his second and last appearance producing Coverdale's solo albums prior to that year. Guitarist Micky Moody had contributed to the majority of the album around that time before Coverdale formed Whitesnake in that same year, officially carrying Moody as a band member until 1983.

The album received a reissue as a part of a compilation album White Snake/Northwinds on 5 April 1988, following a standalone release on 7 November 2000 by Eagle Rock Entertainment and Spitfire, and was released again as part of a double compilation album now titled as The Early Days in 2003. Northwinds received a reissue in 2024 following its appearance in Into the Light: The Solo Albums boxset, containing all of Coverdale's solo works via Rhino Entertainment under the Whitesnake name.

== Background ==
Originally entitled North Winds, the hard rock album leans more towards blues-based and R&B-influenced rock. Coverdale also touched on the genre in his preceding album, White Snake.

The original release of Northwinds contained eight tracks, with two more songs added on recent reissues. Four tracks ("Keep On Giving Me Love", "Queen of Hearts", "Only My Soul", "Breakdown") from this album would later be combined with the tracks from the EP Snakebite from his band Whitesnake to form the album Snakebite.

A number of other titles written by Coverdale were published at the time, which have yet to be released. The titles include "It Would Be Nice", "Love's a Crazy Game", and "Till the Sun Doesn't Shine Anymore".

Lee Brilleaux of Dr. Feelgood played harmonica on Keep On Giving Me Love

== Reception ==
The album received mixed to positive reviews. Bret Adams of AllMusic gave it 3/5 stars, considering it "a huge leap forward in quality from the previous year's White Snake", highlighting "splendid "Time & Again"... "Only My Soul" offers a rich musical stew" with Coverdale's "ethereal singing" holding "it all together". Richie Unterberger gave 3/5 stars to the 1988 double compilation, concluding "they're mediocre listening, the product of a man uncertain about where to take his music as a solo act, without the rock-hard hard rock support of one of his steady bands".

Victor Valdivia, writing for PopMatters, a 6/10 review about both 70s albums stating it is from a pre-late 80s period image when Coverdale "was considered a talented singer with a bluesy voice far more reminiscent of Bad Company's Paul Rodgers than Zep's Robert Plant" and the album sounds "absolutely nothing like Led Zeppelin. Not only is Coverdale's voice much lower and bluesier than it would be in later years, but the music meanders all over the place, from horn-driven funk and R&B, to jazzy piano noodling and a more compact style of hard rock than he would ever try in his career's later incarnations", highlighting tracks "Shame the Devil" and "Give Me Kindness", but also "badly dated" production.

Neil Jeffries, in a 2021 Classic Rock retrospective, included the album as 4th out of 20 on a list of Coverdale-Whitesnake's best albums, saying "it is a remarkably mature album that can still send shivers down the spine 30 years after it was recorded", praising his singing on "touchingly sparse "Time & Again" or "Only My Soul" has rarely been bettered", concluding that "all in all, Northwinds is the antithesis of Whitesnake's super-slick 1987, but it's a fine demonstration of the breadth of Coverdale's talents".

== Release and promotion ==
Northwinds is set to be reissued on Whitesnake's compilation box set featuring Coverdale's solo albums titled Into the Light: The Solo Albums by Rhino Entertainment on 25 October 2024 as a multi-disc box set, including remixed and remastered versions of the album.

== Track listing ==
All songs were written by David Coverdale, except where indicated.

=== Side one ===
1. "Keep On Giving Me Love" (Coverdale, Micky Moody) – 5:16
2. "Northwinds" – 6:13
3. "Give Me Kindness" – 4:34
4. "Time & Again" – 4:02

=== Side two ===
5. "Queen of Hearts" (Coverdale, Moody) – 5:16
6. "Only My Soul" – 4:36
7. "Say You Love Me" – 4:21
8. "Breakdown" (Coverdale, Moody) – 5:15

=== Bonus tracks on the 2000 CD reissue ===
9. "Shame the Devil" – 3:35
10. "Sweet Mistreater" – 3:45

On the original LP release, "Northwinds" is the first track and "Keep On Giving Me Love" is the second; on later reissues these are swapped.

== Personnel ==
Credits are adapted from the album's liner notes

Musicians

- David Coverdale – lead vocals, piano (2, 4), electric piano (3)
- Micky Moody – guitars (all except 4), backing vocals (5)
- Tim Hinkley – piano (1, 3, 5, 7), organ (7, 8), electric piano (2), keyboards (6)
- Alan Spenner – bass (1–3, 5, 6, 8)
- Tony Newman – drums (1–3, 5, 6, 8)

Additional musicians

- Roger Glover – ARP synthesiser (2, 6, 7), clavinet (1), cowbell (1), Oberheim Polyphonic synthesiser (7), chorus vocals (3)
- Graham Preskett – electric violin (2, 4, 7), violin (6, 8)
- Lee Brilleaux – harmonica (1)
- DeLisle Harper – bass (7)
- Simon Phillips – drums (7)
- Ron Asprey – clarinet (3), alto saxophone (7)
- Henry Lowther – trumpet (3)
- Malcolm Griffiths – trombone (3)
- Liza Strike – backing vocals (3, 5, 7)
- Irene Chanter – backing vocals (3, 5, 7)
- Doreen Chanter – backing vocals (3, 5, 7)
- Ronnie James Dio – chorus vocals (3)
- Wendy Dio – chorus vocals (3)
- Charlie – chorus vocals (3)
- Lady Jacky – chorus vocals (3)
- Ian E. Jones – chorus vocals (3)
- John Cody – chorus vocals (3)
- John Punter – chorus vocals (3)
- Jon Walls – chorus vocals (3)
- Jools – chorus vocals (3)
- Judi Glover – chorus vocals (3)
- Judy Lover – chorus vocals (3)

Technical

- Roger Glover – production
- Django John Punter – engineering
- Mack – assistant engineering
- Joe (Blue Bins) Walls – assistant engineering

Design

- Peter Shepherd – cover design
- Peter Livery – cover photography
- Tom Schmid – inner photography

Reissue

- David Coverdale – executive producer
- Tom Gordon – producer, remixing, percussion (2024 remix)
- Alex Breckenridge – remixing, engineering; guitars, bass (2024 remix)
- Aiden Melendez – audio restoration, remixing
- Scott Hull – remastering
- Hugh Gilmour – art direction, design, liner notes
- Sam Stone – project assistance
- Jeff Depaoli – piano, string arrangement (2024 remix)
- Ruth Lenz – violin (2024 remix)
- Olga Archdekin – violin (2024 remix)
- Virginia Evans – viola (2024 remix)
- Luciana Gallo – cello (2024 remix)

== Charts ==
Year	Chart	Position
1982	UK Albums Chart	78
