= I Wanna Be a Cowboy =

1985 single by Boys Don't Cry

Single by Boys Don't Cry

from the album Boys Don't Cry
- B-side: "Turn Over (I Like It Better That Way)"; "Josephine"
- Released: 15 July 1985
- Studio: The Maison Rouge (London, England)
- Genre: New wave; synth-pop; novelty
- Length: 6:06 (album version); 3:54 (radio edit)
- Label: Legacy
- Songwriters: Brian Chatton; Nick Richards; Nico Ramsden; Jeff Seopardi
- Producer: Boys Don't Cry

Boys Don't Cry singles chronology
"Lipstick" (1985)	"I Wanna Be a Cowboy" (1985)	"Cities on Fire" (1986)

Audio
- "I Wanna Be a Cowboy" on YouTube

"I Wanna Be a Cowboy" is a single by the British new wave band Boys Don't Cry. The song was written by four of the band members—Brian Chatton, Nick Richards, Nico Ramsden and Jeff Seopardi—and was released on 15 July 1985 as the first new single from their self-titled debut studio album (an album consisting of part new material and part compilation of several of the band's earlier singles). The female vocals on the song are performed by Heidi Lea.

The single became the band's only major hit, reaching number one in New Zealand, number four in Australia, number 11 in South Africa, and number 12 on the US Billboard Hot 100. It was a comparative failure in the group's native United Kingdom, peaking at number 77 on the UK singles chart. The music video for the song features Lemmy Kilmister of the English rock band Motörhead.

== Background and release ==
Frontman Nick Richards spent one Saturday night watching Clint Eastwood cowboy films such as For a Few Dollars More (1965), and the band had reserved the studio for the next day. Thanks to the films, Richards had the saying, "I wanna be a cowboy, and you can be my cowgirl" stuck in his head, and the band liked it. They put it to some music that keyboardist Brian Chatton had written a year earlier which they had never written lyrics for. They wrote the entire song that Sunday in about an hour, recorded it, and spent three hours mixing it. Richards felt it would be too boring to sing all four verses, so they brought in drummer Jeff Seopardie's girlfriend to sing verse two. The entire single was finished by the end of the day and never mixed again. "The song was meant to be a joke and to make people laugh, but also we thought it would make a great dance track. That turned out to be true," said Richards.

Legacy Records first issued "I Wanna Be a Cowboy" as a 12-inch vinyl single in the United Kingdom on 15 July 1985. In the United States, the A&R chief of Gotham Records, Gary Pini, heard an import copy of the song at a club in New York and wanted to release it. Richards stated, "Gary was so enthusiastic that we figured if somebody wants something that bad, they'll work it." "I Wanna Be a Cowboy" became the first independently released single to enter the US top 20 since "Give It Up" by KC in 1984, which was distributed on Meca Records. The song was an airplay hit around Oklahoma City, where the Oklahoma State University football team is named the Cowboys, allowing it to become a highly requested song on local radio. On 6 June 1986, in the wake of its American success, Legacy re-released the single in the UK.

== Chart performance ==
The song was a commercial disappointment in the band's native United Kingdom, where it stalled at number 77 on the UK Singles Chart, but it found better success abroad. In the United States, the song debuted at number 90 on the Billboard Hot 100 on 5 April 1986. It entered the top 40 on 17 May, then rose up the chart over the next month before reaching its peak of number 12 on 21 June. It stayed on the Hot 100 for a total of 19 weeks. The single also became a dance hit in the US, reaching number 13 on the Billboard 12-inch Singles Sales chart and number 44 on the Dance Club Play chart. On Canada's RPM 100 Singles chart, "I Wanna Be a Cowboy" first appeared the week after its American debut at number 86. Six issues later, on 24 May, it settled at number 19 on the listing, its highest position. On 9 July 1986, it was certified gold by Music Canada for shipping over 50,000 units.

The track found success in other countries as well. In Australia, it first charted on the Kent Music Report in June, climbing to a peak of number four in August. At the end of 1986, it came in at number 29 on the Australian year-end chart. In New Zealand, after debuting at number 17 on 13 July 1986, the single jumped around the top 30 until 17 August, when it rose to number one and stayed there for another two weeks. It spent 15 weeks in the top 50 and was New Zealand's 11th-best-performing song of 1986. Elsewhere, "I Wanna Be a Cowboy" peaked at number 11 in South Africa and number 24 in Belgium. The song missed the top 40 in West Germany by one position, debuting and peaking at number 41 on 1 September 1986.

== Music video ==
=== Background ===
A Spaghetti-Western-style music video was made for the song, featuring Lemmy Kilmister of English rock band Motörhead. Richards initially came up with the idea to recruit Kilmister for the video after watching the Eastwood films. He said, "When I came up with the concept of the 'I Wanna Be a Cowboy' video I wanted a Lee Van Cleef bad boy in the video. Lemmy came to mind immediately!" Kilmister agreed to play the part as long as there was a bottle of Smirnoff vodka on set. The vodka was provided, and filming began at 6 a.m. at Hampstead Heath in London. It was directed by Carina Camamille and produced by Helen McCartney. MTV added the video to its playlists in early April 1986.

=== Reception ===
Video jockey Martha Quinn of MTV told Richards that the channel "hated" the video as it "wasn't rock and roll", but since it had become a top-40 hit by that point, they had to air the video. It subsequently received more than 200,000 requests.

== Track listings ==
UK 7-inch single

A. "I Wanna Be a Cowboy"
B. "Turn Over (I Like It Better That Way)"

- The Australian 7-inch single contains an edited version of "I Wanna Be a Cowboy".

German 7-inch single

A. "I Wanna Be a Cowboy" – 3:54
B. "Josephine" – 4:00

German 12-inch maxi-single

A1. "I Wanna Be a Cowboy" – 5:59
B1. "I Wanna Be a Cowboy" (7-inch version) – 3:54
B2. "Josephine" – 4:00

US 12-inch single

A. "I Wanna Be a Cowboy" – 6:05
B. "I Wanna Be a Cowboy" (instrumental) – 6:05

Canadian 12-inch single

A. "I Wanna Be a Cowboy" (12-inch Saddle mix) – 6:05
B. "I Wanna Be a Cowboy" (instrumental Saloon mix) – 6:05

Japanese 7-inch single

A. "I Wanna Be a Cowboy (ウォナ・ビ・ア・カウボーイ)" – 3:56
B. "Josephine (ジョセフィン)" – 4:00

== Credits and personnel ==
Credits are taken from the UK 7-inch single liner notes and vinyl disc and the liner notes of Boys Don't Cry.

Studio

- Recorded and mixed at The Maison Rouge (London, England)

Boys Don't Cry

- Brian Chatton – writing, keyboards
- Nick Richards – writing, vocals, keyboards
- Nico Ramsden – writing, guitars
- Jeff Seopardi – writing, drums
- Mark Smith – bass guitar
- Boys Don't Cry – production

Additional musicians

- Heidi Lea – female vocals
- Felix Krish – bass synth

Other personnel

- Chris Potter – mixing, engineering
- Tony Taverner – engineering
- Rocks – artwork design
- Simon Fowler – artwork photography

== Charts ==
=== Weekly charts ===
Chart (1986)	Peak position
Australia (Kent Music Report)	4
Belgium (Ultratop 50 Flanders)	24
Canada Top Singles (RPM)	19
New Zealand (Recorded Music NZ)	1
South Africa (Springbok Radio)	11
UK Singles (Official Charts)	77
US Billboard Hot 100	12
US 12-inch Singles Sales (Billboard)	13
US Dance Club Play (Billboard)	44
West Germany (GfK)	41

=== Year-end charts ===
Chart (1986)	Position
Australia (Kent Music Report)	29
New Zealand (RIANZ)	11

== Certifications ==
Region	Certification	Certified units/sales
Canada (Music Canada)	Gold	50,000^{^}
^{^} Shipments figures based on certification alone.

== Release history ==
Region	Date	Format	Label	Ref.
United Kingdom	15 July 1985	12-inch vinyl	Legacy	
United Kingdom (re-release)	6 June 1986	12-inch vinyl	Legacy	
