= Twice as Hard =

Single by The Black Crowes

from the album Shake Your Money Maker
- Released: December 31, 1990
- Recorded: 1989
- Genre: Blues rock, southern rock
- Length: 4:10
- Label: Def American
- Songwriter(s): Chris Robinson and Rich Robinson
- Producer(s): George Drakoulias

The Black Crowes singles chronology
"Hard to Handle" (1990)	"Twice as Hard" (1990)	"She Talks to Angels" (1990)

"Twice as Hard" is a song by American southern rock band the Black Crowes, released as a single in 1990. It is from their first album Shake Your Money Maker. The song reached No. 11 on the Billboard Mainstream Rock chart.

A music video directed by Pete Angelus was shot in 1990 to promote the single. It features the band playing the song at night in a mansion. The band is also shown having a daytime lunch during the guitar solo.

In addition to being the first track on Shake Your Money Maker, "Twice as Hard" is also included on the Crowes' Greatest Hits 1990–1999: A Tribute to a Work in Progress compilation and the 2002 album Live. The song is in the key of G major.

== In other media ==
- In 1998, the song was performed on the Jools Holland show with Kelly Jones of the Stereophonics.
- "Twice as Hard" is used in the films Mad Dog and Glory and Ladder 49.
