= Into the Light (David Coverdale album) =

Studio album by David Coverdale
- Released: 25 September 2000
- Genres: Hard rock; blues rock
- Length: 58:21
- Label: EMI
- Producers: David Coverdale, Doug Bossi, Michael McIntyre, Bjorn Thorsrud, John X. Volaitis

David Coverdale chronology
Restless Heart (1997)	Into the Light (2000)	The Early Years (2003)

Singles from Into the Light
- 1. "Love Is Blind" Released: 11 September 2000; 2. "Slave" Released: 2000

Into the Light is the third and final solo album by English singer David Coverdale, released by EMI on 25 September 2000 in the UK, 27 September in Japan and by Dragonshed on 21 November in the US.

After disbanding his band Whitesnake in 1997, Coverdale was keen on re-establishing himself as a solo artist, having released his previous two solo albums in the late 1970s. In an attempt to distance himself from Whitesnake's hard rock sound, Into the Light features a more stripped down and bluesier style. The album was self-produced by Coverdale, with additional production by Doug Bossi, Michael McIntyre, Bjorn Thorsrud and John X. Volaitis.

Several music critics commended Coverdale's more subdued performance and bluesier approach, while others lamented the album's softer sound. The record charted in six countries, peaking at number five on the UK Rock & Metal Albums Chart. A supporting tour never happened, with Coverdale ultimately deciding to reform Whitesnake in 2003.

A reissue was released as Into the Light: The Solo Albums, including Coverdale's preceding solo works via Rhino Entertainment on 25 October 2024.

== Background ==
Coverdale had released two solo albums in the late 1970s, before forming the hard rock band Whitesnake in 1978. He recorded and toured with the band until 1990, after which he released an album with Led Zeppelin guitarist Jimmy Page. Coverdale then began working on what was to be a new solo album. As the record was being finished, however, the higher ups at EMI demanded it be released under the Whitesnake moniker. Coverdale objected, but ultimately complied due to a clause in his recording contract, which referred to him as "David Coverdale, known as the artist Whitesnake". As a result, the album Restless Heart was released under the moniker "David Coverdale & Whitesnake" in 1997. After a farewell tour, Coverdale disbanded Whitesnake, so that he could resume his career as a solo artist exploring other forms of music.

In an interview with Classic Rock magazine in 2000, Coverdale stated: "The whole premise of my new record, Into The Light, is about coming out of what I felt was a dark period. [...] I didn't really know who I was, using the illusion of David Coverdale I've created, or that other people have. I got tired of trying to live up to that, which is not necessarily who I am." Despite Restless Heart being released under the Whitesnake name, Coverdale considers it and Into the Light "brother and sister albums".

== Production and composition ==
During pre-production, Coverdale rented a house not far from where he lived for writing and rehearsing. He described the writing period as one of the most prolific in his life with over twenty song ideas being submitted for the album. Ultimately, he let the production team choose which songs ended up on the record.

The album was self-produced by Coverdale, with Michael McIntyre, Doug Bossi, Bjorn Thorsrud and John X. Volaitis being credited as associate producers. Volantis also mixed the record, which was then mastered by George Marino. The album features an assortment of session musicians backing Coverdale, including his former Whitesnake bandmates Denny Carmassi (drums) and Tony Franklin (bass). Additionally, future Whitesnake bassist Marco Mendoza performs on the record. Other musicians featured on the album include guitarists Earl Slick and Reeves Gabrels, keyboardist Mike Finnigan, vocalist Linda Rowberry, and harmonica player Jimmy Z. Bjorn Thorsrud and Danny Saber also provide additional instrumentation. Guitarist Adrian Vandenberg, Coverdale's longtime Whitesnake bandmate who co-wrote the song "Too Many Tears", was also invited to play on Into the Light, but declined. According to Coverdale, this was because Vandenberg had problems with his neck vertebra, which made it uncomfortable for him to play guitar.

The first three months of production were spent at a studio in Los Angeles, with the remainder of the album being recorded at Coverdale's home studio at Lake Tahoe. This was so that he could stay close to his wife and son. According to Coverdale, he missed much of his daughter growing up due to work and wished "not to make the same mistakes".

Into the Light was the first album Coverdale recorded digitally, using Pro Tools. He had long been an advocate for the perceived "warmth" of analogue recording, but after working on Into the Light, he considered himself a "digital convert", having perceived "really no difference" between the sound of analogue and digital.

=== Music and lyrics ===
Into the Light features a more stripped-down and blues-influenced sound compared to Coverdale's work with Whitesnake. He professed being "more honest", not having to accommodate his songwriting to suit the band around him. Instead, Coverdale sought musicians that "felt appropriate" for the songs. "It certainly gives me more pleasure across the board than some of the records I've done before", said Coverdale. "It's got the elements I love: rock, soul and blues."

Coverdale had originally envisioned "River Song" for a potential follow-up album with Jimmy Page, which ultimately never materialized. The song dates back to the mid-1980s and a demo recording can be heard on the 35th anniversary edition of Whitesnake's 1984 album Slide It In. The song has been described by Coverdale as a tribute to Jimi Hendrix. The track features keyboardist Mike Finnigan, who had played on Hendrix's 1968 album Electric Ladyland. Finnigan was brought in to do just the song, but he played on several other tracks as well.

"Too Many Tears" originally appeared on Whitesnake's Restless Heart. According to Coverdale, after hearing the original version, singer Chris Isaak suggested doing it in the style of Roy Orbison. As a self-professed Orbison fan, Coverdale liked the idea and decided to re-record the song with a new arrangement. Original co-writer Adrian Vandenberg protested the idea, arguing that their version was already "great". Coverdale then remarked: "It's totally great, but I just wanted to see what it's like with some different colours."

"Don't You Cry" was described by Coverdale as a tribute to songs like Jimmy Cliff's "Many Rivers to Cross", Percy Sledge's "When a Man Loves a Woman" and Bob Marley's "No Woman, No Cry".

Several unreleased songs from the Into the Light sessions were later released on Whitesnake's 2020 compilation album Love Songs. These included "Yours for the Asking", "With All of My Heart", and "Let's Talk it Over". Coverdale wrote "With All of My Heart" as a gift to his wife, while "Let's Talk it Over" was written after a four-day "misunderstanding" they had. Coverdale had hoped to record the latter with Tina Turner. Additionally, the song "Flesh & Blood" was originally written for Into the Light, but wasn't released until 2019 when it appeared as the title track on Whitesnake's Flesh & Blood album.

== Release and promotion ==
Into the Light was released on 25 September 2000 in the UK, followed by a Japanese release two days later. In the US, it was released on 21 November through Coverdale's own Alliance-distributed label Dragonshead. Besides retail, the album was also made available via Coverdale's Artistdirect-produced website, where he released three bonus tracks not included on the physical album. Into the Light charted in six countries, reaching number 75 on the UK Albums Chart for one week. It fared better on the UK Rock & Metal Albums Chart, where it peaked at number five and spent four weeks on the chart.

"Love is Blind" was released as the first single from the record on 11 September 2000 in the UK and on 4 October in Japan. It was accompanied by a music video, directed by Russell Young. The promotional single "Slave" was released on 6 November 2000 in the US and reached number 33 on the Billboard Mainstream Rock Tracks chart. "Don't You Cry" and "Don't Lie To Me" were also released as a double promotional single on 12 February 2001, but neither song charted.

A supporting tour for Into the Light never materialised though Coverdale did express interest while promoting the record. Ultimately, he cited the cost of touring as an independent artist too high. In 2001, Coverdale began working on a follow-up album to Into the Light, but halted work in April 2002, citing his dissatisfaction with state of the music industry. At that same time, he was dropped from the EMI label. In 2003, Coverdale reformed Whitesnake and has since released four new albums with the group.

Into the Light was reissued on Whitesnake's complication box-set featuring Coverdale's preceding solo albums titled Into the Light: The Solo Albums by Rhino Entertainment on 25 October 2024 as a multi-disc box set, including remixed and remastered versions of the album.

== Reception ==
Professional ratings
Review scores
Source	Rating
AllMusic	3/5 stars
Classic Rock	4/5 stars
Kerrang!	3/5 stars
Metal Hammer	6/7 stars
Red Deer Advocate	+
Rock Hard	8/10
Q	2/5 stars
Soundi	3/5 stars

Into the Light received mostly positive reviews from music critics. Siân Llewellyn of Classic Rock awarded the album four stars out five. She gave praise to Coverdale's vocal performance, noting how "the songs he's chosen showcase his vocals subtly rather than bludgeoning you over the head with them". Llewellyn also singled out "Love is Blind" as "one of the best things [Coverdale's] ever come up with". John Kereiff of the Red Deer Advocate called the album one of the year's best, praising the performances of both Coverdale and his backing band.

Liam Sheils, writing for Kerrang!, described Into the Light as an improvement over Whitesnake's previous album Restless Heart. While disappointed by the abundance of ballads, Sheils was pleased with Coverdale's return to his bluesier roots. This was echoed by the staff of Rock Hard, who described the album as a more relaxed effort than Restless Heart, while still acting as a successful cross section of previous Whitesnake material. Metal Hammer's Matthias Mineur singled out "Slave" as one of Coverdale's best songs in years. Overall, he described Into the Light as "great" and "powerful".

AllMusic's Alex Henderson gave cudos to Coverdale for not trying to chase then-current musical trends and instead sticking "with the type of commercial hard rock, arena rock, and power ballads that he is best known for". Ultimately, Henderson described Into the Light as "a decent solo effort that should please those who admire [Coverdale's] '70s and '80s output". Soundi's Antti Mattila commented positively on Coverdale's vocal performance and the album's bluesier style. However, he felt that the songwriting was not quite up to par with Coverdale's earlier work with Whitesnake. Mattila was also unimpressed by the lyrics, which he described as clichéd, a sentiment echoed by Q magazine's Peter Kane.

Neil Jeffries, writing for Classic Rock, ranked Into the Light eighth in Coverdale's overall studio discography. He gave praise to Coverdale's vocals and described the record as a "lost gem", singling out "River Song" as a particular highlight. Mick Wall, in a separate piece for Classic Rock, described the album as a "remarkable, unfairly overlooked peak of [Coverdale's] career".

== Track listing ==
All tracks are written by David Coverdale, except where noted.

No.	Title	Writer(s)	Length
1.	"...Into the Light" (instrumental)		1:16
2.	"River Song"		7:19
3.	"She Give Me..."		4:12
4.	"Don't You Cry"		5:47
5.	"Love Is Blind"	Coverdale, Earl Slick	5:44
6.	"Slave"	Coverdale, Slick	4:51
7.	"Cry for Love"	Coverdale, Doug Bossi, Slick	4:52
8.	"Living on Love"	Coverdale, Bossi, Slick	6:31
9.	"Midnight Blue"	Coverdale, Slick	4:58
10.	"Too Many Tears"	Coverdale, Adrian Vandenberg	5:59
11.	"Don't Lie to Me"	Coverdale, Slick	4:43
12.	"Wherever You May Go"		3:59

Digital bonus tracks
No.	Title	Length
13.	"As Long as I Have You"	3:07
14.	"Oh No! Not the Blues Again"	3:40
15.	"All the Time in the World"	6:35

== Personnel ==
Credits are adapted from the album's liner notes.

Musicians

- David Coverdale – lead vocals; guitar (1, 7), string arrangements (5), shaker (1, 2, 5 and 7)
- Doug Bossi – guitar; backing vocals (except 12)
- Denny Carmassi – drums (except 12)
- Earl Slick – guitar (except 12)
- Reeves Gabrels – guitar (3)
- Dylan Vaughan – guitar (4)
- Danny Saber – guitar, bass (3)
- Marco Mendoza – bass (except 4 and 12), backing vocals (2, 4 and 6–11), Spanish guitar (12)
- Tony Franklin – bass (4)
- Mike Finnigan – organ (2, 4, 5 and 8–10), piano (7, 9)
- Derek Hilland – keyboards (1, 8)
- John X. Volaitis – keyboards (3, 4 and 10–12), vocals (4, 11) percussion (3)
- Linda Rowberry – vocals (12)
- James Sitterly – strings (5)
- Ruy Folguera – string arrangements (5)
- Jimmy Z – harmonica (7)
- Bjorn Thorsrud – tambourine (4), sound effects (12)
- Jasper Coverdale – shaker (1, 2, 5 and 7)

Technical

- David Coverdale – producer
- Doug Bossi – associate producer, engineer
- Bjorn Thorsrud – associate producer, engineer
- John X. Volaitis – associate producer, mixing
- Michael McIntyre – associate producer, engineer
- Rich Veltrop – engineer
- Dylan Vaughan – assistant mixing engineer
- George Marino – mastering

Management

- Jim Morey – management
- Andrew Leff – management
- Jason Morey – management
- Nicholas Brown – business management
- Stephen Marks – business management
- Rhonda Weintraub – business management
- Trevor Robinson – business management
- Tony Russell – legal
- Chris Organ – legal
- Alan Lander – legal

Design

- Russell Young – photography, creative coordination
- Stylorouge – art direction, design
- Cynthia Coverdale – model
- Koh Sakai – liner notes (Japanese edition only)

== Charts ==
Chart (2000)	Peak position
German Albums (Offizielle Top 100)	45
Japanese Albums (Oricon)	25
Scottish Albums (Official Charts)	70
Swedish Albums (Sverigetopplistan)	31
Swiss Albums (Schweizer Hitparade)	84
UK Albums Chart (OCC)	75
UK Rock & Metal Albums Chart (OCC)	5

Chart (2024)	Peak position
Scottish Albums (Official Charts)	98
UK Rock & Metal Albums (Official Charts)	14
