= The Commitments (soundtrack) =

Film soundtrack albums

The music to the 1991 musical comedy-drama film The Commitments featured two soundtrack albums accompanied its release. The first album, entitled The Commitments (Original Motion Picture Soundtrack) was released on 13 August 1991 under the MCA Records label featuring 14 tracks; it was produced by Paul Bushnell, Kevin Killen and Alan Parker and was a chart-topping success upon release, being certified Platinum twice by the Recording Industry Association of America for selling 2 million units in the United States and thrice by the British Phonographic Industry for selling 3 million units in the United Kingdom. At the 1992 Brit Awards, the album won the Brit Award for Best Soundtrack.

After the commercial success of that soundtrack, MCA Records released a follow-up entitled The Commitments Vol. 2 (Music from the Original Motion Picture Soundtrack) on 17 March 1992 featuring 11 tracks, albeit being less successful than the previous release. Both soundtracks were combined and released as a deluxe edition double album by Geffen Records in 2017, that also accompanied five tracks from cast member Andrew Strong's solo album Strong (1993).

== The Commitments (Original Motion Picture Soundtrack) ==
The Commitments (Original Motion Picture Soundtrack)

Soundtrack album by various artists
- Released: 13 August 1991
- Genres: Soul; movie musical
- Length: 46:16
- Label: MCA
- Producers: Paul Bushnell; Kevin Killen; Alan Parker

The Commitments (Original Motion Picture Soundtrack) is the soundtrack album to the film released by MCA Records on 13 August 1991. The album which was produced by Kevin Killen, Paul Bushnell and Alan Parker, featured fourteen songs which appeared in various scenes of the film.

=== Commercial performance ===
The soundtrack album was a commercial success, reaching the number one position of the New Zealand Albums Chart. It also reached number one on the Australian Album Chart, and was certified 5× platinum. The Commitments was present for a total of 76 weeks on the Billboard 200 and peaked at No. 8. According to The Daily Telegraph, it has soundtrack has sold 12 million copies worldwide.

=== Reception ===
AllMusic's Stephen Thomas Erlewine called the album "a bit generic", while Robert Christgau called it "a cross between The Big Chill and The Blues Brothers" with performers who "sacrifice idiosyncrasy for competence". Alan Young of Consequence wrote, "With the film’s soundtrack in check, not just the North Side Dubliners earn a piece of soul, but the gift is shared by everyone who desires a getaway and a simpler, honest approach to the world."

=== Track listing ===
The Commitments (Original Motion Picture Soundtrack) (1991)
No.	Title	Writer(s)	Original artist	Length
1.	"Mustang Sally"	Mack Rice	Wilson Pickett	4:02
2.	"Take Me to the River"	Al Green, Mabon "Teenie" Hodges	Al Green	3:36
3.	"Chain of Fools"	Don Covay	Aretha Franklin	2:58
4.	"The Dark End of the Street"	Dan Penn, Chips Moman	James Carr	2:34
5.	"Destination Anywhere"	Nickolas Ashford, Valerie Simpson	The Marvelettes	3:08
6.	"I Can't Stand the Rain"	Ann Peebles, Don Bryant, Bernard "Bernie" Miller	Ann Peebles	3:12
7.	"Try a Little Tenderness"	Jimmy Campbell and Reg Connelly, Harry M. Woods	Otis Redding	4:31
8.	"Treat Her Right"	Gene Kurtz and Roy Head	Roy Head and the Traits	3:35
9.	"Do Right Woman, Do Right Man"	Penn, Moman	Aretha Franklin	3:15
10.	"Mr. Pitiful"	Redding, Steve Cropper	Otis Redding	2:07
11.	"I Never Loved a Man"	Ronny Shannon	Aretha Franklin	3:09
12.	"In the Midnight Hour"	Pickett, Cropper	Wilson Pickett	2:21
13.	"Bye Bye Baby"	Mary Wells	Mary Wells	3:21
14.	"Slip Away"	William Armstrong, Marcus Daniel, Wilbur Terrell	Clarence Carter	4:27

=== Charts ===
==== Weekly charts ====
Weekly chart performance for The Commitments (Original Motion Picture Soundtrack)
Chart (1991–2014)	Peak position
Australian Albums (ARIA)	2
Austrian Albums (Ö3 Austria)	12
Canada Top Albums/CDs (RPM)	5
German Albums (Offizielle Top 100)	29
New Zealand Albums (RMNZ)	1
Norwegian Albums (VG-lista)	3
Scottish Albums (OCC)	11
Swedish Albums (Sverigetopplistan)	17
Swiss Albums (Schweizer Hitparade)	16
UK Albums (OCC)	9
UK Album Downloads (OCC)	30
UK Hip Hop/R&B Albums (OCC)	4
UK Jazz/Blues Albums (OCC)	1
UK Soundtrack Albums (OCC)	5
US Billboard 200	8

==== Year-end charts ====
Year-end chart performance for The Commitments (Original Motion Picture Soundtrack)
Chart (1991)	Position
Australian Album (ARIA)	16
Chart (1992)	Position
Australian Album (ARIA)	10
Chart (1993)	Position
UK Albums (OCC)	86

=== Certifications ===
Sales and certifications for The Commitments (Original Motion Picture Soundtrack)
Region	Certification	Certified units/sales
Australia (ARIA)	5× Platinum	350,000^{^}
Canada (Music Canada)	2× Platinum	200,000^{^}
New Zealand (RMNZ)	Platinum	15,000^{^}
Sweden (GLF)	Gold	50,000^{^}
United Kingdom (BPI)	3× Platinum	900,000^{^}
United States (RIAA)	2× Platinum	2,000,000^{^}
^{^} Shipments figures based on certification alone.

== The Commitments Vol. 2 (Music from the Original Motion Picture Soundtrack) ==
The Commitments, Vol. 2: Music from the Original Motion Picture Soundtrack

Soundtrack album by various artists
- Released: 17 March 1992
- Genres: Soul; movie musical
- Length: 35:53
- Label: MCA
- Producers: Paul Bushnell; Kevin Killen

The Commitments Vol. 2 (Music from the Original Motion Picture Soundtrack) is the follow-up to the first soundtrack album, produced by Killen and Bushnell and released by MCA Records on 17 March 1992. It included four more songs from the film, as well as seven additional songs performed by the cast.

=== Commercial performance ===
Unlike its predecessor, Vol. 2 proved less successful than the previous release, peaking at No. 118 on the Billboard 200 chart. The album also reached No. 6 on the Australian Album Chart, and was certified gold.

=== Reception ===
Billy Altman, writing for Entertainment Weekly awarded the album a "B", praising the performers for "sounding more mature and together on their seven newly recorded cover versions here than on four left over from the film". Erlewine, in his review for AllMusic awarded the album three stars out of five and described it as being "plain and forgettable".

=== Track listing ===
The Commitments Vol. 2 (Music from the Original Motion Picture Soundtrack) (1992)
No.	Title	Writer(s)	Original artist	Length
1.	"Hard to Handle"	Allen Jones, Al Bell, Otis Redding	Otis Redding	2:23
2.	"Grits Ain't Groceries"	Titus Turner	Little Milton	3:44
3.	"I Thank You"	Isaac Hayes, David Porter	Sam & Dave	3:40
4.	"That's the Way Love Is"	Norman Whitfield, Barrett Strong	Marvin Gaye	4:08
5.	"Show Me"	Joe Tex	Joe Tex	2:56
6.	"Saved"	Jerry Leiber and Mike Stoller	LaVern Baker	2:54
7.	"Too Many Fish in the Sea"	Whitfield, Eddie Holland	The Marvelettes	2:45
8.	"Fa-Fa-Fa-Fa-Fa (Sad Song)"	Redding, Steve Cropper	Otis Redding	2:52
9.	"Land of a Thousand Dances"	Chris Kenner	Chris Kenner	3:16
10.	"Nowhere to Run"	Holland–Dozier–Holland	Martha and the Vandellas	3:39
11.	"Bring It On Home to Me"	Sam Cooke	Sam Cooke	3:41

=== Charts ===
==== Weekly charts ====
Weekly chart performance for The Commitments Vol. 2 (Music from the Original Motion Picture Soundtrack)
Chart (1992)	Peak position
Australian Albums (ARIA)	6
Austrian Albums (Ö3 Austria)	32
Canada Top Albums/CDs (RPM)	58
German Albums (Offizielle Top 100)	58
New Zealand Albums (RMNZ)	3
Norwegian Albums (VG-lista)	11
Swedish Albums (Sverigetopplistan)	25
Swiss Albums (Schweizer Hitparade)	15
UK Albums (OCC)	13
UK Compilation Albums (OCC)	93
UK Jazz/Blues Albums (OCC)	23
US Billboard 200	118

==== Year-end charts ====
Year-end chart performance for The Commitments Vol. 2 (Music from the Original Motion Picture Soundtrack)
Chart (1992)	Position
Australian Album (ARIA)	55

=== Certifications ===
Sales and certifications for The Commitments Vol. 2 (Music from the Original Motion Picture Soundtrack)
Region	Certification	Certified units/sales
Australia (ARIA)	Gold	35,000^{^}
New Zealand (RMNZ)	Gold	7,500^{^}
United Kingdom (BPI)	Gold	100,000^{^}
^{^} Shipments figures based on certification alone.

== The Commitments (Deluxe Edition) ==
The Commitments (Deluxe Edition) is the double-disc soundtrack combining both the first and second soundtrack, featuring 25 songs in total. In addition, the album also contains five songs from the cast member Andrew Strong's solo album Strong (1993).

=== Reception ===
AllMusic's Erlewine described the combination as "all competent, respectful tribute to classic '60s R&B and soul". Kingsley Abbott of Record Collector noted that the album offers "constant variety and interest".

=== Chart performance ===
The Commitments (Deluxe Edition)
Chart (2024)	Peak position
UK Album Downloads (OCC)	48
UK Soundtrack Albums (OCC)	22
