= Hard to Handle (song) =

1968 song by Otis Redding

Song by Otis Redding

from the album The Immortal Otis Redding
- Released: June 1968
- Recorded: 1967
- Genre: R&B; soul
- Length: 2:21
- Label: Atco
- Songwriters: Allen Jones; Al Bell; Otis Redding
- Producer: Steve Cropper

Official audio
- Hard To Handle (Official Lyric Video) on YouTube

"Hard to Handle" is a 1968 song written by American soul singer Otis Redding along with Al Bell and Allen Jones. Originally recorded by Redding, it was released in 1968 as the B-side to "Amen" (shortly after the singer's sudden death in 1967). The song also appears on the 1968 album The Immortal Otis Redding. Redding's version reached number 38 on the Billboard R&B chart and number 51 on the pop chart.

The American rock band the Black Crowes covered the song for their 1990 debut album, Shake Your Money Maker, reaching number 26 on the Billboard Hot 100 with their rendition.

== Certifications ==
| Region | Certification | Certified units/sales |
|---|---|---|
| United Kingdom (BPI) | Silver | 200,000^{‡} |
^{‡} Sales+streaming figures based on certification alone.

== Grateful Dead version ==
"Hard to Handle" was performed by the Grateful Dead about 90 times between March 1969 and August 1971 with Ron "Pigpen" McKernan taking the lead vocals. The band subsequently performed the song only twice, on December 30 and 31, 1982, with Etta James taking the vocals and support from the Tower of Power horns.

== The Black Crowes version ==
"Hard to Handle"

Single by The Black Crowes

from the album Shake Your Money Maker
- B-side: "Waitin' Guilty"; "Jealous Again" (acoustic); "Sister Luck" (live)
- Released: August 13, 1990
- Genre: Southern rock; hard rock; alternative rock
- Length: 3:08
- Label: Def American
- Songwriters: Allen Jones; Al Bell; Otis Redding
- Producer: George Drakoulias

The Black Crowes singles chronology
| "Jealous Again" (1990) | "Hard to Handle" (1990) | "Twice As Hard" (1990) |

Music video
- "Hard to Handle" on YouTube

American rock band the Black Crowes covered the song for their 1990 debut album, Shake Your Money Maker. Two versions of the song exist: the original album version and the hit single remixed with an overdubbed brass section, available on the 30th Anniversary edition of Shake Your Money Maker. The album version was first released as a single in the United Kingdom in August 1990 and was issued in the United States later the same year.

The song peaked at number 45 on the US Billboard Hot 100, number one on the Billboard Album Rock Tracks chart, and number 45 on the UK Singles Chart. Following the success of the band's first top-40 hit, "She Talks to Angels", the song re-entered the Hot 100 and peaked at number 26 in August 1991, becoming the Black Crowes' highest position on the chart. The same month, the song was re-released in the UK and reached a new peak of number 39.

The guitar solo was played by Brendan O'Brien on a Gibson Les Paul owned by Rick Rubin.

=== Track listings ===
US 7-inch and cassette single (1990)

A. "Hard to Handle" (album version) – 3:08
B. "Waitin' Guilty" – 3:02

International 7-inch and cassette single (1990)

A. "Hard to Handle" (album version) – 3:06
B. "Jealous Again" (acoustic version) – 4:37

UK 12-inch single and Japanese maxi-CD single (1990)

1. "Hard to Handle"
2. "Jealous Again" (acoustic version)
3. "Twice As Hard" (live at the Paradiso, June 5, 1990)
4. "Stare It Cold" (live at the Paradiso, June 5, 1990)
- A 12-inch picture disc was also released, omitting "Stare It Cold".

UK CD single (1990)

1. "Hard to Handle"
2. "Jealous Again" (acoustic version)
3. "Twice as Hard" (remix)

UK 7-inch single (1991)

A. "Hard to Handle" (album version)
B. "Sister Luck" (live at the Greek Theatre)

UK 7-inch picture disc (1991)

A. "Hard to Handle" (album version)
B. "Stare It Cold" (live at the Greek Theatre)

UK 12-inch single (1991)

A1. "Hard to Handle"
B1. "Dreams" (live at the Greek Theatre)
B2. "Stare It Cold" (live at the Greek Theatre)

UK CD single (1991)

1. "Hard to Handle"
2. "Sister Luck" (live at the Greek Theatre)
3. "Stare It Cold" (live at the Greek Theatre)

Japanese mini-CD single (1991)

1. "Hard to Handle"
2. "Jealous Again" (acoustic version)

=== Charts ===
==== Weekly charts ====
Weekly chart performance for "Hard to Handle"
| Chart (1990–1991) | Peak position |
|---|---|
| Australia (ARIA) | 79 |
| Canada Top Singles (RPM) | 40 |
| Netherlands (Single Top 100) | 56 |
| UK Singles (Official Charts) | 45 |
| UK Singles (Official Charts) 1991 re-release | 39 |
| UK Airplay (Music Week) | 56 |
| US Billboard Hot 100 | 26 |
| US Mainstream Rock Airplay (Billboard) | 1 |
| US Cash Box Top 100 | 21 |

==== Year-end charts ====
Year-end chart performance for "Hard to Handle"
| Chart (1991) | Position |
|---|---|
| US Album Rock Tracks (Billboard) | 20 |

=== Certifications ===
| Region | Certification | Certified units/sales |
|---|---|---|
| United Kingdom (BPI) | Silver | 200,000^{‡} |
^{‡} Sales+streaming figures based on certification alone.

=== Release history ===
Release history and formats for "Hard to Handle"
| Region | Date | Format(s) | Label(s) | Ref. |
|---|---|---|---|---|
| United Kingdom | August 13, 1990 | 7-inch vinyl; 12-inch vinyl; cassette | Def American | |
| United Kingdom | August 28, 1990 | 12-inch picture disc | Def American | |
| United States | October 1990 | —N/a | Def American | |
| Australia | October 15, 1990 | 7-inch vinyl; CD; cassette | Def American | |
| Japan | November 25, 1990 | Maxi-CD | Def American | |
| Australia | January 14, 1991 | 7-inch vinyl; CD; cassette | Def American | |
| Japan | May 25, 1991 | Mini-CD | Def American | |
| United Kingdom | August 12, 1991 | 7-inch vinyl; 12-inch vinyl; CD | Def American | |

== Other versions ==
- The first recorded cover of the song was by the band Harpers Bizarre, on their album Harpers Bizarre 4, released in 1969
- Another cover of the song was recorded in late 1969 by Liquid Smoke, a group from Long Island, New York, and released in early 1970 on their eponymous debut album.
- A cover of the song appears on Tony Joe White's 1970 album Tony Joe.
- Mae West performed the song in the 1970 film Myra Breckinridge.
- British band Snafu included the song on their 1975 album All Funked Up and performed it for John Peel on his show of 4 September 1975.
- The song was used in the film "The Commitments," and appears on the soundtrack.
