= Boys Don't Cry (band) =

British pop/rock band

- Origin: London, England
- Genres: New wave; synth-pop
- Years active: 1983–1988; 2009–present
- Labels: Legacy (UK); Profile (US); Mercury (Canada); Intercord Tonträger GmbH (Germany)
- Members: Nick Richards*; Jesse Hunter; David Rehmann; Arthur Medina
- Past members: Brian Chatton*; Jeff Seopardi*; Nico Ramsden*; Mark Smith*; Richard Taee; Steve Creese * denotes members of the band's "classic lineup"

Boys Don't Cry are a British new wave band known for the hit single "I Wanna Be a Cowboy", which peaked at No. 12 on the US Billboard Hot 100 in 1986 and charted around the world.

== Biography ==
The band was formed in 1983 as the brainchild of lead vocalist/keyboardist Nick Richards, who had just purchased Maison Rouge Recording Studios in London. An early version of the group (featuring Richards, guitarist Richard Taee and drummer Steve Creese, augmented by session musicians) released their debut EP Don't Talk to Strangers on independent UK label Legacy Records in Britain in 1983. By the mid-1980s, the band's line-up had stabilised around principal members Richards and keyboardist Brian Chatton (one of the session players on the debut EP), along with Jeff Seopardi on drums, Nico Ramsden on guitar, and Mark Smith on bass. Chatton previously played keyboards with 1970s progressive band Jackson Heights, contributing heavily to their last three albums, The Fifth Avenue Bus in 1972, Ragamuffin's Fool published the same year and Bump 'n' Grind in 1973.

Boys Don't Cry were discovered by Paul Oakenfold, who was a talent scout for Profile Records in London in the mid-1980s. Best known for being Run-DMC's record label at the time, Profile signed the band for the US market and Legacy retained the rights to the band's UK releases. Mercury Records won the bidding for Canada and Intercord Tonträger GmbH handled their releases in Germany.

Nick Richards states:

"Paul Oakenfold was hired by me to promote 12 inch records released by my label, Legacy, at clubs. He did not discover the band, but dropped off a white label promo copy of 'I Wanna Be a Cowboy' at the Limelight night club in New York City. The head of A&R at Profile Records heard the song there one night and traced it back to me in London!"

— Nick Richards, Interview with Nick Richards, Rediscover the 80s

The single "I Wanna Be a Cowboy" was released in 1986. A novelty song with deadpan humour and kitschy references, the song has been described as the perfect musical realisation of a Spaghetti Western movie. It hit No. 12 on the Billboard Hot 100 and No. 13 on the Hot Dance Music/Maxi-Singles Sales chart in 1986–1987, and was R&R No. 8. "I Wanna Be a Cowboy" was also a top 10 hit in Australia and South Africa. The video, filmed on-location in Hampstead Heath, featured a cameo appearance by Lemmy Kilmister of Motörhead.

They would go on to release two full-length albums: a self-titled debut in 1986, which included "I Wanna Be a Cowboy", and a follow-up the following year titled Who the Am Dam Do You Think We Am. The second album was simply released in America as Boys Don't Cry, creating some confusion there, since the band now had two consecutive self-titled albums released within a year of each other. The follow-up single to "I Wanna Be a Cowboy" was (necessarily perhaps) a complete departure; "Cities On Fire", an energetic rush of synth-rock which was released in 7" and 12" remix form, received early attention from MTV but failed to connect with fans of the novelty hit and didn't receive enough airplay to create a new fanbase.

In 1991 "I Wanna Be a Cowboy" was featured in the night club scene in the film The Last Boy Scout.

== Origin of name ==
Contrary to popular belief, the moniker "Boys Don't Cry" did not come from The Cure's song/album of the same name. Rather, the name has its origins in whispered lyrics from fellow British band 10cc's hit song "I'm Not in Love" ("be quiet... big boys don't cry"). However, the band were evidently aware of, and perhaps amused by, the confusion surrounding their name, and they even included a mostly instrumental bonus track titled "The Cure" on their second album as a joke.

== Recent times ==
In 2009, Nick Richards and Brian Chatton teamed up again in Los Angeles to write an album. The first single from the album, "Don't Call Me a Country Singer" peaked at No. 7 on the FMQB a/c radio charts. Richards put together a new Boys Don't Cry line-up, featuring Doug Gild on bass, Mike Licata on drums, Aaron McClain and James Richards on guitars, and Teddy Rae Richards on backing vocals. Barbara Baker has taken over the management. This incarnation later planned to tour with Red Entertainment on an "Eighties Retro" tour.

On 2 November 2009, the band's former bass player, Mark Smith, died at his home in London. Mark was just 49 years old, and he had originally been tapped to join the band for the following year's touring.

The band played a New Year's Eve show in Hollywood with special guest stars including Roy Hay from Culture Club and Nina Hagen. They have also released a brand new 6-track EP entitled Blow Me, which is only available as a download.

Boys Don't Cry released a brand new album, Hear It Is!, on 14 August 2014. The songs were penned by original members Nick Richards and Brian Chatton. The album is on Richards' own label Microrich, Inc.

=== 2020–present: Greatest Hits album, re-releases, and new music ===
In late April 2020, Boys Don't Cry announced the release of a new Greatest Hits album titled All the Very Best. This compilation spans the band's entire career to date, including songs from their first two full-length albums and later material.

Shortly thereafter, Nick Richards announced that the band was re-releasing their entire back catalogue, including the band's 1983 debut EP Don't Talk to Strangers, both of their full-length 1980s albums, and Hear It Is!, along with a new album of outtakes and new/unreleased tracks titled Odds and Sods. (One apparent exception, the early single, "Who Said It?", also featured on the original 1983 EP, did not appear among the re-released material.)

According to the band's Facebook page, in 2025, Nick Richards formed his own online label called HEADGAMES. The band is planning on releasing new and old material throughout the year, through this label. The first release, entitled "4PLAY", will be a four-track EP celebrating the 40th anniversary of the song "I Wanna Be A Cowboy", consisting of four never-previously-released mixes.

== Discography ==
=== Albums ===
Year	Album	Peak position	
Year	Album	AUS	US
1986	Boys Don't Cry	54	55
1987	Who the Am Dam Do You Think We Am (released in the U.S. as a second self-titled album)	—	—
2014	Hear It Is!	—	—

==== Compilations ====
- White Punks on Rap: A History of Boys Don't Cry 1983–1999 (2008)
- All the Very Best (2020)

==== Miscellaneous ====
- Odds and Sods (2020)

=== Singles and EPs ===
Year	Single or EP	Peak position				
Year	Single or EP	AUS	US	US Dance	UK	Canada RPM
1983	"Heart's Bin Broken"	—	—	—	-	-
1983	Don't Talk to Strangers (UK release only)	—	—	—	-	-
1984	"Turn Over"	—	—	—	-	-
1985	"Cities on Fire"	—	—	—	-	-
1985	"Lipstick"	—	—	—	-	-
1985	"I Wanna Be a Cowboy"	4	12	44	77	19
1986	"Josephine"	—	—	—	-	-
1987	"Who the Am Dam Do You Think You Am"	—	—	—	94	-
1987	"We Got the Magic"	—	—	—	-	-
1996	"I Wanna Be a Cowboy 86–96"	—	—	—	-	-
2020	"Harem Shuffle"	—	—	—	-	-
