= Snafu (band) =

British rhythm and blues/rock band

- Origin: United Kingdom
- Genres: Funk rock; rhythm and blues; country rock
- Years active: 1972–1975
- Labels: WWA, EMI
- Past members: Bobby Harrison; Micky Moody; Terry Popple; Colin Gibson; Pete Solley; Brian Chatton

Snafu are a British rhythm and blues/rock band, originating in the 1970s, featuring vocalist Bobby Harrison and slide guitarist Micky Moody. The band briefly reformed in 1981 for one show under the name The Dirty Gaze.

On 28 August 1975 the band were featured on the BBC Radio 1 Peel Sessions. Produced by Tony Wilson, the set comprised "Bloodhound", "Every Little Bit Hurts", "Hard to Handle" and "Lock and Key".

== Discography ==
"That's the Song" by Snafu
An audio sample of "That's the Song", from their 1973 debut album Snafu

=== Albums ===
| Year | Title | Notes |
|---|---|---|
| 1973 | Snafu | WWA: WWA 003 |
| 1974 | Situation Normal | WWA: WWA 013 |
| 1975 | All Funked Up | Capitol: E-ST 11473 |
