= The Warriors (British band) =

UK musical group

The Warriors, also known as The Electric Warriors, were a British Beat group of the early 1960s. While the band recorded a few singles with Decca Records, it is mostly remembered because many of its members (most notably Jon Anderson) later became successful musicians in the British progressive rock scene of the 1970s.

The line-up included Jon Anderson (later Yes singer) on vocals, Jon's brother Tony Anderson (later Los Bravos member) on vocals, Brian Chatton on keyboards (who would later join Phil Collins and Ronnie Caryl to form Flaming Youth and after that join ex-The Nice Lee Jackson in Jackson Heights), Ian Wallace (later King Crimson and Bob Dylan's drummer) on drums, and David Foster (later in Badger with ex-Yes keyboardist Tony Kaye) on bass, as well as two guitarists – Rod Hill and Mike Brereton.

The Warriors played in several venues in England, including The Cavern Club in Liverpool, mostly doing covers from the early Beatles' repertoire such as "I'm Down" and "She's a Woman". In 1964 they recorded two singles for Decca: "You Came Along" and "Don't Make Me Blue", both produced by Ivor Raymonde. They appeared in a 1964 movie entitled Just for You and contributed to the movie score with the song "Don't Make Me Blue".

A live performance of the Warriors from 1965 has been released on CD with title Bolton Club 65 (available on David Foster's website). Another release of the same CD is also distributed under title Warriors 65.

Anderson and Foster continued writing together on other occasions, contributing two tracks to Yes' second album, Time and a Word: "Sweet Dreams" and "Time and a Word".

== Music videos ==
Year	Video
1964	"Don't Make Me Blue"
1967	"Mr Nobody Nothing"
1967	"Tango"
