= Micky Moody =

English musician (born 1950)

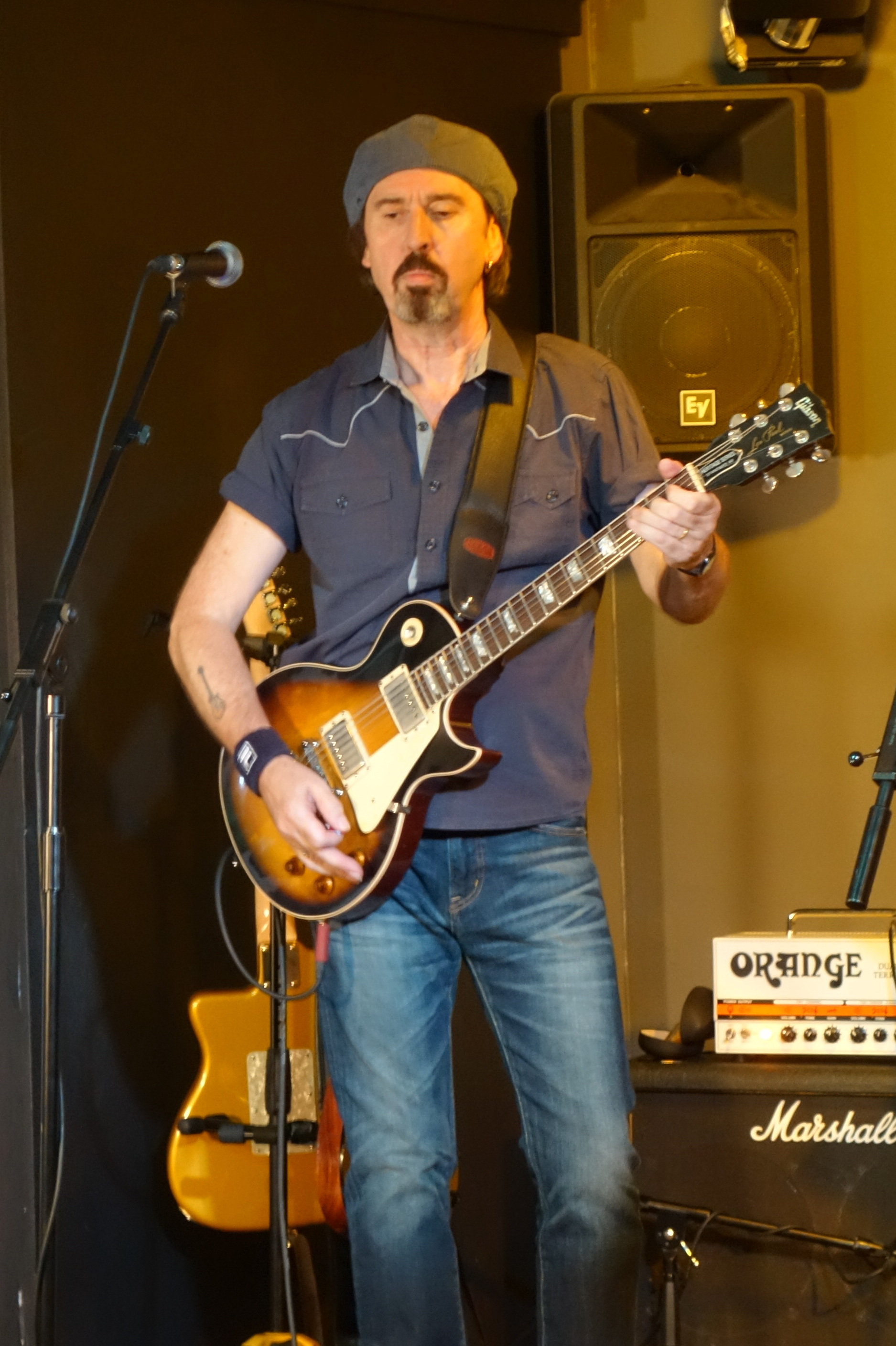
- Moody performing in 2014

Background information
- Born: Michael Joseph Moody; 30 August 1950 (age 76); Middlesbrough, England
- Genres: Hard rock, heavy metal, blues rock, blues, pop
- Occupations: Musician, songwriter, author
- Instruments: Guitar, slide guitar, Vocals
- Website: mickymoody.com

Michael Joseph Moody (born 30 August 1950) is an English guitarist, and a former member of the rock bands Juicy Lucy and Whitesnake. He was also a founder-member of Snafu. Together with his former Whitesnake colleague Bernie Marsden he founded the Moody Marsden Band, and later, the Snakes, having previously collaborated with unofficial fifth Status Quo member Bob Young in Young & Moody. Along with Marsden and ex-Whitesnake bassist, Neil Murray, he formed the Company of Snakes and M3 Classic Whitesnake with which they mainly performed early Whitesnake songs. From 2011 to 2015, Moody toured and recorded with Snakecharmer, a band he co-formed.

Besides this, Moody has also toured with Roger Chapman, Frankie Miller and Chris Farlowe. He has also performed live alongside the likes of Eric Clapton, Alvin Lee, Mick Taylor, Bruce Dickinson, Sam Brown, Gary Brooker, Suggs, Dennis Locorriere, Paul Jones, P. P. Arnold, James Hunter, Rick Wakeman, Jon Lord, Newton Faulkner, Uriah Heep, Alice Cooper, Mark King, Alfie Boe, Sandi Thom, Brian Auger, Paul Weller, Eric Bibb, Meat Loaf, Boy George, Elkie Brooks, Nona Hendryx, Mud Morganfield and one of his early guitar heroes, Duane Eddy. Since 2000 he has released several solo albums: I Eat Them For Breakfast (2000), Don't Blame Me (2006), Acoustic Journeyman (2007) and Electric Journeyman (2009). A versatile guitarist, Moody has been an active session musician and his own website lists over 100 albums to which he has contributed musically. 2006 saw the release of the autobiographical Playing With Trumpets – A Rock 'n' Roll Apprenticeship, a memoir about his early days on the music scene. Another book of memoirs, Snakes and Ladders, was released in 2016. His library music has been featured on such TV programmes as Waking the Dead, Bo' Selecta!, America's Next Top Model, How to Look Good Naked, Top Gear, Horizon, Jersey Shore, Mad Men, Wife Swap and Paul Hollywood's Bread. More recently, Moody has worked alongside Ali Maas Moody and they have co-written and released two albums, Black & Chrome and Who's Directing Your Movie?

== Biography ==
=== 1960s ===
While at school in Middlesbrough and attending private guitar lessons, Moody formed The Roadrunners with others from the area including Paul Rodgers (later of Free and Bad Company). They were subsequently joined by bass player Bruce Thomas, later to play with Elvis Costello and the Attractions. The band performed covers in local halls and clubs. By 1967 they had developed and outgrown the local music scene and turned professional, changing their name to The Wildflowers and subsequently moving to London. They had some success and undertook some touring, but relationships within the band frayed and they eventually split without making any recordings. Moody returned home to Middlesbrough where for a while he widened his musical horizons by taking classical guitar lessons. He also became increasingly interested in slide guitar techniques (a style with which he would later be closely associated). While living in Middlesbrough he was asked by local singer and entrepreneur John McCoy to form a group, which became Tramline. A deal for two albums was signed with Island Records, but by the time the second album was released the band had broken up. Moody joined Lucas and the professional soul band Mike Cotton Sound, who became Gene Pitney's backing band for UK tours as well as others such as Paul Jones.

=== 1970s ===
In 1970 he joined recently repatriated keyboard player Zoot Money as guitarist. He then replaced Neil Hubbard in Juicy Lucy, with whom he recorded three albums and toured extensively before the group disbanded. After the band split, Moody co-founded Snafu which combined his funk-rock guitar style with U.S down-home stateside grooves. The band recorded three albums, SNAFU, Situation Normal and All Funked Up. They also appeared on a 1974 Sounds of the 70s session, a 1974 edition of The Old Grey Whistle Test presented by Bob Harris, a 1975 (recorded 28 August, broadcast 4 September) John Peel radio session, and the TV series Supersonic. Extensive touring followed before the band broke up. At this time Moody undertook occasional work as a session player, most notably for Graham Bonnet. He also contributed to one track on Gerry Rafferty's City to City. He performed with the former Status Quo drummer John Coghlan's Diesel Band, then recorded an album with the band's tour manager and lyricist Bob Young which became Young & Moody, this collaboration also resulted in a single featuring, amongst others, Lemmy from Motörhead and the Nolan Sisters on backing vocals . He then toured with Frankie Miller and stood in as a guest with Hinkley's Heroes, before joining his friend David Coverdale. Moody knew Coverdale – who had fronted Deep Purple and was looking to undertake a solo venture – from the Middlesbrough music scene in the late sixties. Coverdale invited Moody to work with him, and the album White Snake was released in 1977. Moody shared writing credits on four songs, including the title track. A second album Northwinds followed in 1978, on which Moody contributed to three songs. Following the demise of Deep Purple MkIV, Coverdale and Moody joined forces with Bernie Marsden, Neil Murray, Dave 'Duck' Dowle and keyboardist Brian Johnston to form a band that took its name Whitesnake from the title of Coverdale's first solo album. In 1978 they recorded the EP Snakebite, followed by two studio albums, Trouble (1978) and Lovehunter (1979), recorded by a modified lineup with Jon Lord on keyboards. Moody is credited with co-writing four of the tracks on Trouble, and was sole writer of "Belgian Tom's Hat Trick", an instrumental. While working with Whitesnake he also played slide guitar on Roger Chapman's debut solo album Chappo.

=== 1980s ===
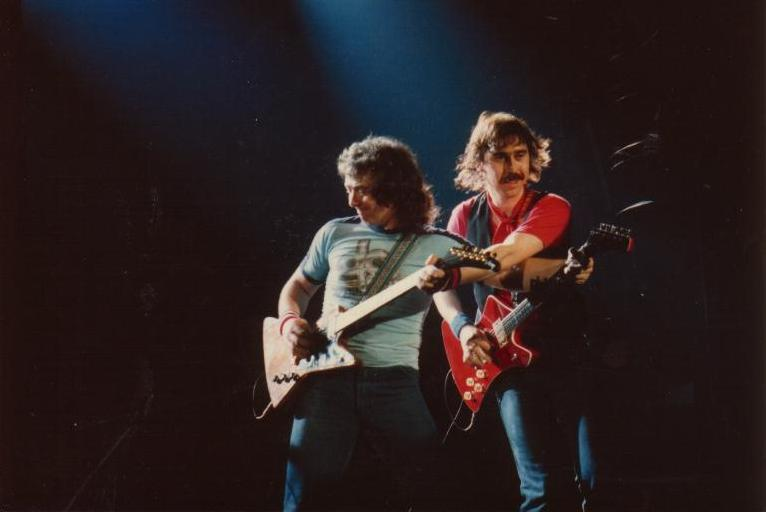
Moody (right) and Bernie Marsden (left) performing with Whitesnake at Hammersmith Odeon in 1981

Moody contributed slide guitar to three tracks on former Lindisfarne member Ray Jackson's solo debut In the Night, which was released in 1980. By this point Whitesnake now featured Ian Paice from Deep Purple on drums, who had been brought into the group to replace Dowle. In 1980 this line up released the album Ready an' Willing, from which two UK singles were taken, Fool for Your Loving and the album title track, both co-written by Moody. The band also released the double album Live...in the Heart of the City in the same year. At his time he recorded two singles with Bob Young, with all tracks written by Moody.

In 1981, Graham Bonnet's Line-Up featured Moody playing guitar on all tracks and three songs written by Moody with Bob Young. Moody maintained a busy schedule with Whitesnake, who released the album Come an' Get It in the same year. Relationships within the band were beginning to sour, and Moody's guitar partner Bernie Marsden left prior to the final completion of the next album Saints and Sinners. Moody himself followed soon afterward. Whitesnake took time out for much of 1982 and Moody undertook some session work, with Sheena Easton and others. By late 1982 Whitesnake was reformed with Mel Galley replacing Marsden and Moody joining Galley on the album's backing vocal sessions. In 1983 Coverdale replaced Ian Paice and Neil Murray with Cozy Powell and Colin Hodgkinson. Moody was unhappy with the direction the new band was taking and felt increasingly sidelined by Coverdale. Despite this deteriorating situation, he recorded Slide It In – a process he described as an "unhappy experience" – but then left the band in 1983.

Moody returned to session work with Mike Oldfield, Gary Glitter, Mike d'Abo and Roger Chapman, as well as selected TV music library work. He toured with Chris Farlowe and worked with former Meal Ticket singer Willy Finlayson and his band the Hurters. Taking a wry, witty view of some of the people and experiences they'd encountered over the years, he and Bob Young wrote a book on musicians' humour, the acclaimed Language of Rock and Roll. He also put together the first version of the Micky Moody Band, featuring former Taste bassist Charlie McCracken and drummer Chris Hunt. Towards the end of the decade, he and Bernie Marsden played selected venues with their own Moody Marsden Band.

=== 1990s ===
During the early 1990s, Moody toured extensively with Roger Chapman. "What a bloke," marvelled the singer. "Every hotel we stayed in, he used to get his black bin-liners out and start taping them to the windows – can't sleep if there's any light in the room. They used to think he was mad. Lovely fella though. A great guitarist. And intelligent too. Too intelligent for Coverdale."

Moody reunited on a more permanent basis with Whitesnake guitarist Bernie Marsden, to tour and record as the Moody Marsden Band in the UK and Europe. They issued two live albums, Never Turn Our Back on the Blues and Live in Hell and a studio set, Real Faith. In 1996, Moody toured the US as part of the Best of British Blues tour, also featuring Eric Burdon, Alvin Lee, Aynsley Dunbar, Boz Burrell and Tim Hinkley. The following year, Moody and Marsden teamed up with Norwegian rockers Jørn Lande, Willy Bendickson and Sid Ringsby to form The Snakes, a band that specialised in reproducing the sounds of the original Whitesnake. Don Airey would often be brought in to augment them on keyboards. The band recorded two albums, Once Bitten and Live in Europe before making way for The Company of Snakes, which featured former Bad Company vocalist Robert Hart, original Whitesnake bass player Neil Murray and ex-Manfred Mann's Earth Band drummer John Lingwood. Hart was eventually replaced by ex-Snakes in Paradise frontman Stefan Berggren, and the band released two albums, Burst the Bubble and a live set Here They Go Again.

=== 2000s ===
In 2000, Moody wrote and produced library music prior to the release of his first official solo album, I Eat Them For Breakfast. Continuing to perform with Company of Snakes and take on occasional session work, Moody joined his former Juicy Lucy bandmate Paul Williams to arrange and record a selection of acoustic classic Chicago blues tracks for the album Smokestacks, Broomdusters and Hoochie Coochie Men. He also played occasional duo gigs with bluesman Papa George. 'Snake' metamorphosed into M3 Classic Whitesnake and also released a live CD (featuring former Black Sabbath singer Tony Martin) and a live DVD with the former The Company Of Snakes singer Stefan Berggren back, and with the special guest appearance from former Ritchie Blackmore and Yngwie Malmsteen frontman Doogie White. The DVD also featured sessionman Jimmy Copley (who worked with bands such as Go West and Tears for Fears) on drums and Mark Stanway from Magnum on keyboards.

Around this time Moody played on Nah Aufnahme by German musician Westernhagen, which eventually appeared in the national charts. 2006 saw the release of Moody's self-produced solo album Don't Blame Me, released at the same time as his memoirs Playing with Trumpets – A Rock 'n' Roll Apprenticeship. M3 broke up later that year, after which Moody performed more shows with Roger Chapman plus selected dates with a line-up of the Micky Moody Band that featured his eldest son Micky Moody Jr. on drums. In 2008, he toured Japan as special guest of Jimmy Copley and Japanese guitarist Char. Also featured was ex-Herbie Hancock bassist Paul Jackson and keyboard player Yoshinobu Kojima. The shows were recorded and released on DVD as Jimmy Copley & Char: Special Session. To celebrate his love of instrumental music, Moody wrote and produced the albums Acoustic Journeyman (2007) and Electric Journeyman (2009).

=== 2010s ===
In 2011, Moody co-wrote library music for both Warner/Chapell and Universal before co-forming Snakecharmer, a group that also included former Whitesnake colleague Neil Murray, former Wishbone Ash guitarist Laurie Wisefield, singer Chris Ousey (Heartland), drummer Gary James (Thunder, Magnum) and Ozzy's keyboardist Adam Wakeman. In 2015, Moody left Snakecharmer in order to pursue his solo career. In recent years, Moody also made regular appearances alongside blues guitarist Papa George and has been an active member of the "Sunflower Jam" house band and the Bad Apples.. In 2016 he and Ali Maas Moody released their first album together. They also played live regularly with their Ali Maas and Micky Moody Band.

=== 2020s ===
In 2020, Micky and Ali Maas Moody released their second co-written album and continued to work together.

== Discography ==
=== With Tramline ===
- 1968 Somewhere Down The Line
- 1969 Moves of Vegetable Centuries

=== With Juicy Lucy ===
- 1970 Lie Back and Enjoy It
- 1971 Get a Whiff a This
- 1972 Pieces

=== With Snafu ===
- 1973 Snafu
- 1974 Situation Normal
- 1975 All Funked Up

=== With Bob Young ===
- 1977 Young and Moody
- 1995 The Nearest Hits Album
- 2010 Back for the Last Time Again

=== With David Coverdale ===
- 1977 White Snake
- 1978 Northwinds

=== With Whitesnake ===
- 1978 Snakebite
- 1978 Trouble
- 1978 Live at Hammersmith
- 1979 Lovehunter
- 1980 Ready an' Willing
- 1980 Live...in the Heart of the City
- 1981 Come an' Get It
- 1982 Saints & Sinners
- 1984 Slide It In

=== With The Moody Marsden Band ===
- 1992 Never Turn Our Back on the Blues
- 1994 Live in Hell
- 1994 The Time Is Right For Live
- 1994 Real Faith (reissued in 2000 as Ozone Friendly)
- 2000 The Night the Guitars Came to Play

=== With The Snakes, Company of Snakes & M3 ===
- 1998 Once Bitten (Japan)
- 1998 Live in Europe
- 2001 Here They Go Again
- 2002 Burst the Bubble
- 2005 Classic Snake Live
- 2005 Rough An' Ready (live album)
- 2007 Rough An' Ready (live DVD)

=== With Snakecharmer ===
- 2013 Snakecharmer

=== With The Bad Apples ===
- 2014 Played

=== With Ali Maas ===
- 2016 Black & Chrome
- 2020 Who's Directing Your Movie?

=== Solo ===
- 2000 I Eat Them for Breakfast
- 2002 Smokestacks, Broom Dusters and Hoochie Coochie Men (with Paul Williams)
- 2006 Don't Blame Me
- 2007 Acoustic Journeyman
- 2008 Live and Rocking! – Live at the Hell Blues Festival 2000 (Micky Moody & Friends)
- 2009 Electric Journeyman

=== Guest appearances ===
- 1969 You Can All Join In (VA)
- 1970 Zoot Money (Zoot Money)
- 1973 In Memory of Robert Johnson (Paul Williams)
- 1973 I Never Got (Tony Kelly)
- 1973 Manor Live (VA)
- 1973 Me and My Friend (Patrick Campbell Lyons)
- 1974 Funkist (Bobby Harrison)
- 1975 Squire (Alan Hull)
- 1975 Legend (Mickey Jupp)
- 1977 Graham Bonnet (Graham Bonnet)
- 1977 Fancy That (Joanna Carlin)
- 1977 City to City (Gerry Rafferty)
- 1979 Chappo (Roger Chapman)
- 1981 Line Up (Graham Bonnet)
- 1982 Riff Burglars (Roger Chapman)
- 1982 Madness, Money & Music (Sheena Easton)
- 1986 In Quo Country (Bob Young)
- 1987 Islands (Mike Oldfield)
- 1987 Party Album (Gary Glitter)
- 1987 Reaching Out (Paul Millns)
- 1987 Indestructible (Mike D'Abo)
- 1987 No Angel (Sanne Salomonsen)
- 1988 New Day (Jane Harrison)
- 1989 Walking The Cat (Roger Chapman)
- 1990 Hybrid and Lowdown (Roger Chapman)
- 1991 Blue-Eyed Slide (Brian Knight)
- 1992 Parlour Games (John Spencer)
- 1992 Blues Brittania (VA)
- 1992 Waiting in the Wings (Chris Farlowe)
- 1992 Very Much Alive (Willy Finlayson and The Hurters)
- 1993 Midnight Postcards (Adam Faith)
- 1994 Tellin' Stories (Walter Trout)
- 1994 Line Up (Borderline)
- 1995 Together (Peter Smith)
- 1995 Green and Blues (Bernie Marsden)
- 1996 Kiss My Soul (Roger Chapman)
- 1996 Blue Thunder (Blue Thunder)
- 1998 Pinboard Wizards (Jackie Lynton)
- 2000 Here After (Jamie Marshall)
- 2000 Gimme All Your Topp (VA)
- 2000 Snakebites (VA)
- 2000 Glory Bound (Chris Farlowe)
- 2001 Another Hair of the Dog (VA)
- 2001 Tam de ti ye... (Ani Lorak)
- 2002 Fairytale (Peer Gynt)
- 2002 Who's He Calling Me Him (Norman Beaker Band)
- 2003 Freak Out (Chris Catena)
- 2004 On The Wire (Smokie)
- 2005 Nah Aufnahme (Westernhagen)
- 2007 One More Time For Peace (Roger Chapman)
- 2007 Human Spirit (Gary Fletcher)
- 2008 Slap My Hand (Jimmy Copley)
- 2009 Live at Abbey Road (Endangered Species)
- 2010 Live in Kawasaki/Demons & Wizards in Kawasaki (Official Bootleg) (Uriah Heep)
- 2013 The Proof (The Proof)
- 2013 Tailshaker (Brothers in Blues)
- 2013 Friends for a LIVEtime (The Hamburg Blues Band)
- 2014 Celebrating Jon Lord (VA)
- 2015 Hold On (Eugene Hideaway Bridges)
