= Bobby Harrison (musician) =

British musician (1939–2022)

Robert Leslie Harrison (22 June 1939 – 7 January 2022) was an English drummer and singer who was best known as an early member of the progressive rock band Procol Harum.

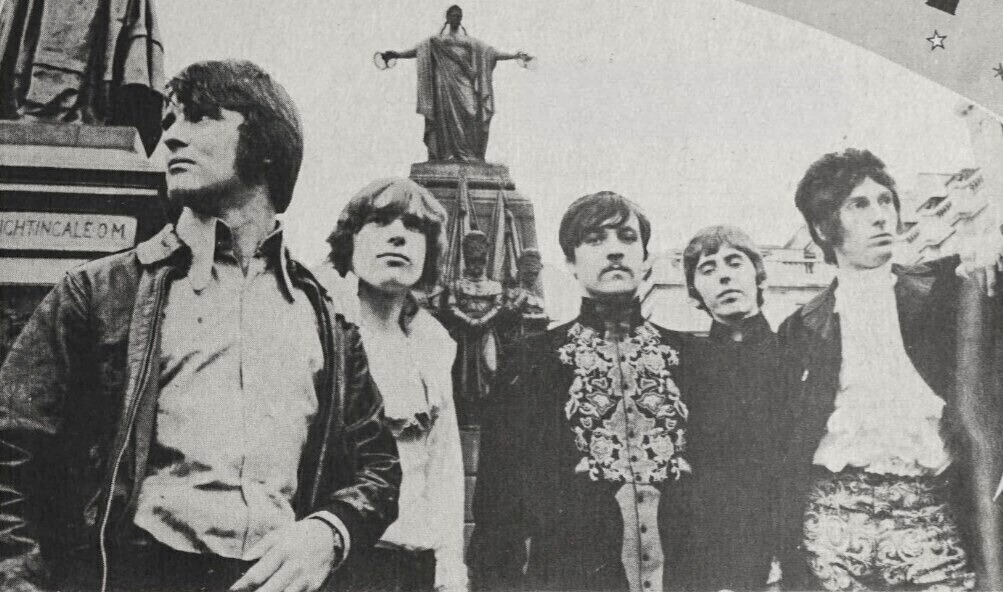
Harrison (far left) with Procol Harum in 1967

== Life and career ==
Harrison was born in East Ham, London, on 22 June 1939. He was an early member of Procol Harum, but shortly after their 1967 hit single "A Whiter Shade of Pale" (the hit version of which actually featured session drummer Bill Eyden, not Harrison) was released, he and guitarist Ray Royer left the group to form the band Freedom. He also worked with several other members of Procol Harum on other projects; he joined a band called SNAFU which contained Procol's future organist Pete Solley, and also on Matthew Fisher's solo album Journey's End. His 1977 self-titled project album Nobody's Business was released only in Japan.

Harrison was later in a band called Journey, where he played Christian-oriented rock around the Leigh-on-Sea area of Essex. He died on 7 January 2022, at the age of 82.
