= Robert Wyatt discography =

- Studio albums: 8
- EPs: 9
- Compilation albums: 10
- Singles: 15
- Archival albums: 3
- Remix albums: 1
- Collaborative albums: 3
- Box sets: 2

The discography of Robert Wyatt, a retired English musician, comprises eight solo studio albums, six archival/collaboration albums, ten compilation albums, two boxed sets, nine EPs, and 15 singles. Additionally, Wyatt has appeared as a guest musician on numerous albums by other artists.

Between 1966 and 1971, Wyatt served as the drummer and vocalist for the Canterbury scene band Soft Machine, performing on the band's first four albums: The Soft Machine (1968), Volume Two (1969), Third (1970) and Fourth (1971).

Additionally, he led his own group Matching Mole for two initial studio albums in 1972, plus several archival/live releases over the decades since.

== Albums ==
=== Studio albums ===
Title	Album details	Peak chart positions					
Title	Album details	UK	UK Indie	BEL (FL)	FRA	IT	SWE
The End of an Ear	Released: 4 December 1970; Label: CBS; Formats: LP	—	—	—	—	—	—
Rock Bottom	Released: 26 July 1974; Label: Virgin; Formats: LP, MC, 8-track	—	—	—	—	—	—
Ruth Is Stranger Than Richard	Released: 30 May 1975; Label: Virgin; Formats: LP, MC, 8-track	—	—	—	—	—	—
Old Rottenhat	Released: November 1985; Label: Rough Trade, Gramavision; Formats: CD, LP, MC	—	4	—	—	—	—
Dondestan	Released: August 1991; Label: Rough Trade, Gramavision; Formats: CD, LP, MC	—	—	—	—	—	—
Shleep	Released: 24 September 1997; Label: Hannibal, Thirsty Ear; Formats: CD, LP, MC	136	35	—	—	—	—
Cuckooland	Released: 25 September 2003; Label: Hannibal; Formats: CD	173	20	—	59	49	—
Comicopera	Released: 5 October 2007; Label: Domino; Formats: CD, LP, digital download	85	8	63	41	48	52
"—" denotes releases that did not chart or were not released in that territory.

=== Archival albums ===
Title	Album details	Peak chart positions
Title	Album details	IT
Theatre Royal Drury Lane 8th September 1974	Released: 10 October 2005; Label: Hannibal; Formats: CD; As Robert Wyatt & Friends	73
Radio Experiment Rome, February 1981	Released: 7 August 2009; Label: Rai Trade; Formats: CD, LP; Italy-only release	—
'68	Released: 8 October 2013; Label: Cuneiform; Formats: CD, LP, digital download	—
"—" denotes releases that did not chart or were not released in that territory.

=== Remix albums ===
Title	Album details
Dondestan (Revisited)	Released: 21 October 1998; Label: Hannibal, Thirsty Ear; Formats: CD

=== Collaborative albums ===
Title	Album details	Peak chart positions			
Title	Album details	UK	UK Indie	FRA	US Jazz
Musik: Rearranging the 20th Century	Released: 20 September 2004; Label: Enja; Formats: CD; Germany-only release; With Gilad Atzmon & the Orient House and Guillermo Rozenthuler	—	—	—	—
...For the Ghosts Within	Released: 11 October 2010; Label: Domino; Formats: CD, LP, digital download; With Gilad Atzmon and Ros Stephen	150	18	120	24
KiTsuNe / Brian the Fox	Released: 6 March 2019; Label: Flau; Formats: 2xCD, 2xLP, digital download; Japan-only release; With the Future Eve	—	—	—	—
"—" denotes releases that did not chart or were not released in that territory.

=== Compilation albums ===
Title	Album details	Peak chart positions	
Title	Album details	UK Indie	BEL (FL)
Nothing Can Stop Us	Released: March 1982; Label: Rough Trade, Gramavision; Formats: LP; Germany-only release	4	—
1982–1984	Released: November 1984; Label: Rough Trade; Formats: LP	—	—
Late '70's – Early '80's	Released: 25 May 1985; Label: Japan; Formats: CD; Japan-only release	—	—
Compilation	Released: 1990; Label: Gramavision; Formats: CD, MC	—	—
Mid-Eighties	Released: 25 September 1993; Label: Rough Trade, Gramavision; Formats: CD	—	—
Going Back a Bit: A Little History of Robert Wyatt	Released: June 1994; Label: Virgin; Formats: 2xCD	—	—
Flotsam Jetsam	Released: 15 August 1994; Label: Rough Trade; Formats: CD	—	—
Solar Flares Burn for You	Released: 16 September 2003; Label: Cuneiform; Formats: CD; US-only release	—	—
His Greatest Misses	Released: 29 September 2004; Label: Hannibal; Formats: CD; Japan-only release	—	—
Different Every Time	Released: 14 November 2014; Label: Domino; Formats: 2xCD, digital download; Also released in 2 2xLP volumes	26	191
"—" denotes releases that did not chart.

=== Box sets ===
Title	Album details
EPs	Released: 9 February 1999; Label: Hannibal, Thirsty Ear; Formats: 5xCD
Robert Wyatt Box Set	Released: 3 August 2009; Label: Domino; Formats: 14xCD

== EPs ==
Title	Album details	Peak chart positions
Title	Album details	UK Indie
Summer Into Winter	Released: 2 April 1982; Label: Cherry Red; Formats: 12"; With Ben Watt	—
The Animals Film	Released: April 1982; Label: Mute; Formats: LP; Mini-album	18
Work in Progress	Released: August 1984; Label: Rough Trade; Formats: 12"	2
4 Track EP	Released: 1984; Label: Virgin; Formats: 12"	—
The Last Nightingale	Released: December 1984; Label: Rē; Formats: 12"	10
The Peel Sessions	Released: 1987; Label: Strange Fruit; Formats: 12"	36
A Short Break	Released: 9 November 1992; Label: Voiceprint; Formats: CD	—
The Garden of Love	Released: 1997; Label: Voiceprint; Formats: CD; With Kevin Ayers, Mike Oldfield, David Bedford, Lol Coxhill and Six Beautiful Girls	—
Hot Chip with Robert Wyatt and Geese	Released: 22 December 2008; Label: EMI/DFA; Formats: CD; With Hot Chip and Geese	—
"—" denotes releases that did not chart or were not released in that territory.

== Singles ==
Title	Year	Peak chart positions		
Title	Year	UK	UK Indie	NZ
"I'm a Believer"	1974	29	—	—
"Yesterday Man"	1977	—	—	—
"Arauco"	1980	—	10	—
"At Last I Am Free"	1980	—	18	—
"Stalin Wasn't Stallin'"	1981	—	26	—
"Grass"	1981	—	14	—
"Shipbuilding"	1982	35	1	27
"The Wind of Change" (with the Swapo Singers)	1984	86	3	—
"Chairman Mao" (Italy-only release)	1987	—	—	—
"Free Will and Testament"	1997	—	—	—
"This Summer Night" (with Bertrand Burgalat)	2007	—	—	—
"What a Wonderful World" (with Gilad Atzmon and Ros Stephen; promo-only release)	2010	—	—	—
"Stella Maris" (with Boris Grebenshchikov; Russia-only release)	2015	—	—	—
"Ibrahim" (The Great Divide featuring Robert Wyatt)	2016	—	—	—
"Tutti Shrutti" (Future Pilot A.K.A. featuring Robert Wyatt)	2019	—	—	—
"—" denotes releases that did not chart or were not released in that territory.

== Tributes ==
Year	Album	Artist
1998	The Different You - Robert Wyatt e Noi	(various)
2000	Soupsongs Live: The Music of Robert Wyatt	(various, featuring Julie Tippetts, Ian Maidman, Annie Whitehead, Didier Malherbe, George Khan, Harry Beckett, Phil Manzanera, Janette Mason, Steve Lamb & Liam Genockey)
2001	MW pour Robert Wyatt	(various)
2009	Around Robert Wyatt	Orchestre National de Jazz
2011	The Songs of Robert Wyatt and Antony & the Johnsons	The Unthanks
2018	What Light There Is Tells Us Nothing	Janek Schaefer
2019	Folly Bololey	North Sea Radio Orchestra

== Appearances ==
- Backing vocals on The Animals' Love Is (1968)
- Drums on most of Kevin Ayers Joy of a Toy (1969)
- Drums on two tracks of Syd Barrett The Madcap Laughs (1970)
- Harmony vocals on "Whatevershebringswesing" on Kevin Ayers's Whatevershebringswesing (1971)
- Drums and vocals on Daevid Allen Banana Moon (1971)
- Drums on The Keith Tippett Group Dedicated To You, But You Weren't Listening (1971)
- Drums on Keith Tippett's Centipede Septober Energy (1971)
- Drums on Don "Sugarcane" Harris Sugar Cane's Got the Blues (1971)
- Drums on Don "Sugarcane" Harris New Violin Summit (1972)
- Harmony vocals on "Hymn" on Kevin Ayers Bananamour (1973)
- Percussion on Kevin Ayers June 1, 1974 (1974)
- Percussion and backing vocals on Brian Eno Taking Tiger Mountain (By Strategy) (1974)
- 2nd lead vocals on "Calyx" on Hatfield and the North Hatfield and the North (1975)
- Vocals and percussion on Phil Manzanera Diamond Head (1975)
- Vocals on Michael Mantler The Hapless Child (1975/76)
- Vocals on John Cage "Experiences No. 2" and The Wonderful Widow Of Eighteen Springs on Jan Steele/John Cage's Voices and Instruments (1976)
- Vocals on Michael Mantler Silence (1976)
- Vocals on "Bad Alchemy" and "Little Red Riding Hood Hits the Road" on Henry Cow Concerts (1976)
- Piano on "1/1" and "1/2" on Brian Eno Ambient 1: Music for Airports (1978)
- Recorded a one-minute piano/vocal version of "Strangers In The Night" for the compilation album Miniatures - a sequence of fifty-one tiny masterpieces produced by Morgan Fisher (1980)
- Drums on Kevin Coyne Sanity Stomp (1980)
- Vocals on Nick Mason Fictitious Sports (1981)
- Drums on one track of The Raincoats Odyshape album (1981)
- Keyboards on Scritti Politti Songs to Remember (1982)
- Wyatt released Summer Into Winter in collaboration with Ben Watt (1982), an EP of extra tracks for Watt's 1987 album North Marine Drive
- Vocals on two tracks on The Last Nightingale (1984)
- Vocals on four tracks on News from Babel Letters Home (1986)
- Vocals on three tracks on Michael Mantler Many Have No Speech (1987)
- Vocals on Ultramarine United Kingdoms (1993)
- Vocals on one track on Michael Mantler The School of Understanding (1996)
- Vocals on three tracks on John Greaves Songs (1996)
- Vocals, trumpet, vocal percussions, whistle and backing vocals on one song on Cristina Donà Nido (1999)
- Vocals on Michael Mantler Hide and Seek (2000)
- Vocals on Pascal Comelade September Song EP (2000)
- Vocals on one track on Anja Garbarek Smiling & Waving (2001)
- Vocals on two tracks on Bruno Coulais motion picture soundtrack Travelling Birds (2001)
- Cover version of "Love" on Uncut Presents: Instant Karma 2002; a Tribute to John Lennon (2002)
- Vocals on "Submarine" on Björk's Medúlla (2004)
- Spoken word and trumpet on "Re-arranging the 20th Century" on Gilad Atzmon's Musik (2004)
- Vocals on six tracks on Michael Mantler Review (compilation – 2006)
- Readings on some tracks on Max Richter Songs from Before (2006)
- Cornet on the song "Then I Close My Eyes" on David Gilmour On an Island (2006)
- Vocals on the song "Flies" with Brian Eno on Plague Songs (compilation – 2006)
- Guest cornet on Clear Frame (Lol Coxhill, Charles Hayward, Hugh Hopper, Orphy Robinson) (2007)
- Cornet on the song "Then I Close My Eyes" on David Gilmour Remember That Night (2007)
- Wyattron on "Cold Shoulder" on Kevin Ayers The Unfairground (2007)
- Vocals on "This Summer Night" on Bertrand Burgalat Chéri B.B (2007) – released in 2008 as a limited edition 12" vinyl single (500 copies only)
- Vocals and shared song-writing credits on two tracks for Monica Vasconcelos' album Hih (2008)
- Backing vocals on "I Keep Faith" on Billy Bragg Mr Love & Justice (2008)
- Hand Drums on two songs on Everything That Happens Will Happen Today by David Byrne and Brian Eno (2008)
- "Camouflage" in collaboration with Barbara Morgenstern on her album BM (2008)
- Trumpet and piano on "A Song for Alice" on Paul Weller 22 Dreams album (2008)
- Vocals on Hot Chip (featuring Geese) EP (not the LP of the same name) Made in the Dark (2009)
- Vocals (partly lead, partly backing) and trumpet on some tracks on Jeanette Lindström Attitude and Orbit Control (2009)
- Vocals on "Sad Eyes" on Dave Sinclair album Stream (2011)
- Lead vocals and horn on "When U Love Somebody" and backing vocals on "No Water" on Ian James Stewart's album Junk DNA (2013).
- Vocals, cornet and horn on "Stella Maris" by Robert Wyatt and Boris Grebenshchikov (2015)
- Cornet on the song "The Girl in the Yellow Dress" on David Gilmour Rattle That Lock (2015)
- Vocals, Tenor Horn on the song "Ibrahim" on The Great Divide's Ibrahim EP (2016)
- Trumpet on the song "She Moves With The Fayre" on Paul Weller A Kind Revolution (2017)
- Vocals & Source Sounds on "What Light There Is Tells Us Nothing" on Janek Schaefer What Light There Is Tells Us Nothing LP (2018)
- Vocals on three tracks on Mary Halvorson's Code Girl Artlessly Falling (2020)
