= Theatre Royal Drury Lane 8th September 1974 =

Live album by Robert Wyatt & Friends
- Released: 10 October 2005
- Recorded: 8 September 1974
- Venue: Theatre Royal, Drury Lane in Covent Garden, London
- Studio: Mixed at Gallery Studios in Kilburn, London in 2005
- Genre: Progressive rock; jazz fusion
- Length: 70:54
- Label: Hannibal (owned by Rykodisc); Domino Recording Company (2008 reissue)

Robert Wyatt & Friends chronology
Cuckooland (2003)	Theatre Royal Drury Lane 8th September 1974 (2005)	Comicopera (2007)

Theatre Royal Drury Lane 8th September 1974 is a 2005 live album by English progressive rock musician Robert Wyatt, documenting a concert on that date at the Theatre Royal, Drury Lane in London. The concert took place the year after Wyatt had fallen from a fourth-storey window and become paralysed from the waist down. Since the accident, Wyatt has used a wheelchair. The concert remains Wyatt's first and only live performance as a headlining solo artist.

The concert served as the live premiere of Wyatt's studio album Rock Bottom, which had been released a little over a month prior. In addition to the songs from Rock Bottom, the set list included cover of songs by Wyatt's former bands; a performance by Julie Tippetts of her own song, "Mind of a Child"; and most notably, an extended version of "I'm a Believer", a song written by Neil Diamond for American pop-rock band The Monkees. Wyatt had just recorded and released his cover of "I'm a Believer", which became a surprise hit single in the UK. The assembled band, dubbed Robert Wyatt & Friends, included most of the musicians from the Rock Bottom recording sessions and several guests. Robert Wyatt & Friends consisted of Dave Stewart, Laurie Allan, Hugh Hopper of Soft Machine, Mongezi Feza, Gary Windo, Mike Oldfield, Nick Mason of Pink Floyd, Fred Frith of Henry Cow, Julie Tippetts, and Ivor Cutler. The BBC Radio 1 DJ John Peel gave an introduction for Wyatt.

Contemporaneous reviews of the concert were positive. After the concert, Wyatt continued his recording career but stopped performing as a solo artist due to the difficulties of organizing a live backing band and his chronic, intense stage fright. Bootleg recordings of the concert emerged in the early 1980s. The official release in 2005 received generally favorable reviews, with critics praising the album as a showcase for Wyatt's vocals and a compelling document of the progressive Canterbury scene. Simon Reynolds wrote "[a]larming but true: one of the best releases of 2005 was recorded 31 years ago." However, the official release suffers from inconsistent sound quality because about half of the original recordings had been lost.

== Background ==
In the late 1960s and early 70s, Robert Wyatt was known as an English songwriter, singer, and drummer associated with the Canterbury scene of prog-rock musicians. Wyatt was kicked out of the band Soft Machine in 1971 and then formed his own band, Matching Mole. After releasing two records, Wyatt dissolved Matching Mole, feeling overwhelmed by his responsibilities as bandleader. Still, he began writing new music with the intention of reuniting the band for a third Matching Mole album.

But plans for a third Matching Mole record were cut short in 1973 when Wyatt, heavily intoxicated from drinking, fell from a fourth-story window. He survived, but was left paralysed from the waist down. Since the accident occurred, Wyatt has used a wheelchair and no longer plays the drums. During the time spent recovering in hospital, Wyatt further developed the songs he'd intended to use for Matching Mole. These songs were ultimately recorded and released in 1974 as a solo record, Rock Bottom. His first album on Virgin Records, Rock Bottom was released on 26 July 1974, the same day as Wyatt's wedding to Alfreda Benge (known as Alfie). The British music press lauded Rock Bottom upon its release.

Wyatt recorded Rock Bottom with musicians from both the progressive rock and jazz scenes. Dissatisfied with jazz fusion as it had existed previously, which he felt typically took the "worst of both worlds" from each genre with excessive "noodling," Wyatt sought to achieve a novel, "upside down" style of jazz-rock fusion all his own on Rock Bottom. Musically, Rock Bottom combined the "looseness," "rhythm section," improvisation and instrumentation of jazz with the song-form structure of rock or folk music. The songs of Rock Bottom would form the centerpiece of the Drury Lane concert, which featured musicians from both the rock and jazz traditions.

== The concert at the Theatre Royal, Drury Lane ==
=== Planning and promotion ===
Most of the lineup of Robert Wyatt and Friends in a promo photo used for the concert poster and an NME cover. Clockwise from bottom: Wyatt, Mike Oldfield, Gary Windo, Dave Stewart, Laurie Allan, Nick Mason, Mongezi Feza, Julie Tippetts.

To promote Rock Bottom, a headlining performance by Wyatt was held on 8 September 1974 at the Theatre Royal, Drury Lane, a West End theatre in London. The concert was reportedly arranged by the Virgin Records executive Richard Branson, who told Wyatt that certain musicians had expressed interest in performing as Wyatt's backing band for a concert. Meanwhile, Branson also told the same musicians that Wyatt had expressed interest in recruiting them for his live band.

The one-off backing band assembled for the concert, dubbed Robert Wyatt & Friends, included most of the musicians featured on Rock Bottom along with several other guests. The band included Wyatt's "dream rhythm section" of Dave Stewart on keyboards, Laurie Allan on drums, and Hugh Hopper on bass guitar. Other performers from the Rock Bottom sessions included Mongezi Feza on trumpet, Mike Oldfield on guitar, Fred Frith on several stringed instruments, and Ivor Cutler on spoken word vocals. Nick Mason, the drummer of Pink Floyd and producer of Rock Bottom, made a guest appearance on drums. Julie Tippetts, who was not involved in recording Rock Bottom, sang back-up vocals on several songs and performed one of her own songs, "Mind of a Child". Most of the band had collaborated with Wyatt prior to Rock Bottom; for example, Hopper was also in Soft Machine, and Wyatt and Tippetts had both been members of Centipede.

Wyatt and most of the band members appeared in a promo photo, which was used for the concert poster and on the cover of NME. In the photo, the band members sat in wheelchairs for the photo in a display of "wheelchair solidarity" with Wyatt. Mason was superimposed into the image later. Commenting on the photo years later, Wyatt told Uncut it was "a real laugh doing it", but said that the NME received complaints from readers who felt the image was "a bit tasteless". Wyatt said he couldn't understand those who objected to the image: "I thought it was a very good idea. Especially on steps—wheelchairs on steps are dangerous, they're rubbish! There are people in wheelchairs and with other disabilities, who I know from letters and so on, who were very encouraged that far from my career as a musician being over, it actually got much stronger in terms of my contribution to it." The concert announcement in the NME prominently mentioned that the show would feature Oldfield, who was already one of the best-selling British musicians of the 1970s with the multi-platinum Tubular Bells and its followup Hergest Ridge released the month before the concert.

=== Performance ===
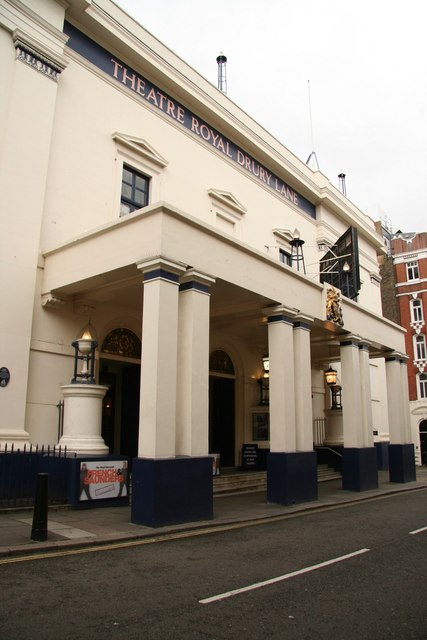
Exterior of the Theatre Royal, Drury Lane in 2008

The concert was scheduled to begin at 8:30 pm, and a crowd of hippies gathered outside the venue nearly two hours prior. John Peel, the BBC Radio 1 disc jockey, served as the evening's master of ceremonies wearing a glam rock-style costume. Opening acts Ivor Cutler and Phyllis King performed songs and spoken word poetry. Peel, who had considered Wyatt his favorite drummer prior to the accident, delivered an introduction and concluded by announcing: "And now, for Robert Wyatt of Twickenham... opportunity knocks!"

Wyatt entered the stage and received a standing ovation. Positioned between a mixer and keyboards, he said that the mixer was not actually plugged in but would give him "something to do with my hands." He said he would "probably not" play the keyboards, since he had not done so in rehearsal, but remarked that they "look good" anyway. The set list opened with two covers of songs composed by Hopper: "Dedicated to You But You Weren't Listening", from the Soft Machine album Volume Two, and "Memories", a song from The Wilde Flowers, Wyatt and Hopper's first band together. Wyatt's anxiety was evident during these first two songs; critics later described the performances of Hopper's songs as "good-naturedly rickety" and "fractured".

"Sea Song" (live)
The conclusion of Robert Wyatt & Friends' nine-minute performance of "Sea Song", with Wyatt's improvised scat singing over the band's jazz fusion rhythm.

The band then performed the songs from Rock Bottom, starting with "Sea Song". Over the course of the concert, Wyatt's band performed Rock Bottom in its entirety, albeit not in the same order as the album. The more confident performance of Rock Bottom turned a corner from the unsteady playing in the first two songs. Wyatt, in particular, performed with noticeably greater confidence after the audience applauded in recognition at the opening lines of "Sea Song". During "Sea Song", the band launched into extended group improvisations not present on the studio version, which Simon Reynolds compared to an "Anglicised Bitches Brew," and ends the song with improvisatory scat singing, which Reynolds described as his "falsetto spiral[ling] up into ecstatic scat acrobatics, as though his spirit is trying to escape his shattered body." Will Hermes likened Wyatt's scat vocals throughout the concert to the sound of "a choirboy at an acid test."

The performance of the next song, "A Last Straw", has a noticeable swing rhythm and, according to NPR's Andy Battaglia, is "rawer [and] more raucous" than the studio version. Wyatt again sang vocal improvisations and scat vocals. Oldfield made a brief, inconspicuous appearance onstage to play synthesizer toward the end of "A Last Straw". On "Little Red Riding Hood Hit the Road", Frith played rhythm guitar and Feza soloed on trumpet. Feza's soloing was lauded by critics; Mike Barnes of The Wire said Feza "lets rip some extraordinary note-streams in his trademark hard, bright sound." According to Barnes, Windo's tenor saxophone solo on "Alife" evoked the German free jazz saxophonist Peter Brötzmann. The first set ends with "Alifib", which Reynolds called a "gorgeous quilt of shimmering keys and glistening guitar".

After "Alifib", Julie Tippetts performed an interlude of her own music: the ballad "Mind of a Child", "Behind the Eyes", and a freeform flute solo. Both songs come from her 1974 album Sunset Glow, which Wyatt considered to be a "companion piece" to Rock Bottom. "Mind of a Child" is the only song by Tippetts included on the official live album; Barnes speculated that the others were presumably deleted to fit a CD-length total runtime. Critical assessment of Tippetts' segment of the show was decidedly mixed. The NME said she "rather derailed things" with her "uncertain" piano playing and the "lugubriousness" of her songs, despite her "compelling" voice. Barnes called "Mind of a Child" a "poignant" song and lamented the omission of Tippetts' other music from the album, but conceded her "two songs together did effectively drive a wedge through the set."

Tippetts' songs were followed by a noisy free improvisation with Wyatt, Feza and Windo, also omitted from the album. The second set began with the final song on Rock Bottom, "Little Red Robin Hood Hit the Road". In "Calyx", a Hatfield and the North cover originally recorded as an instrumental with wordless vocals, Wyatt sang lyrics of his own devising to the melody in addition to scatting.

=== Concert reception ===
The live performance was met with enthusiastic reviews. In the Daily Telegraph, Maurice Rosenbaum wrote "[t]here was more genuine originality in Robert Wyatt's concert at Drury Lane Theatre last night than I have heard for a long time. It is a variety of pop music for which there is no neat pigeonhole but it is as creative and satisfying in its own way as the music of the so-called 'avant-garde.'" Charles Shaar Murray in NME praised Wyatt's vocals as "better than ever" and concluded "[g]enerally, the show veered from the sublime to the ridiculous, with the sublime firmly in the lead." Although Murray disliked Tippet's contributions, he highlighted the "thoroughly berserk version" of "I'm a Believer" as the show's climax, particularly the "singularly dirty rhythm guitar" played by Oldfield. In a profile of Mike Oldfield by Karl Dallas for the British music magazine Let It Rock, Dallas praised Oldfield and Frith's guitar playing at the show, writing "you could feel the thrill run through the theatre" when Oldfield came onstage.

== Subsequent live performances ==
Shortly after the concert at Drury Lane, the NME asked Wyatt if he planned to perform again soon. Wyatt replied:

No. I knew it was gonna be quite good, because ... I felt that no matter how bad it was, [Allan, Hopper, Stewart, Frith] and so on would be able to pull something out of the hat. ... I get things together in live performances that I wouldn't get together normally and there's certainty a certain magic to it if it's working right, but the sheer cost and the whole organisation of getting a live group working and the solid responsibilities of getting other people paid – there's just so many things that can go wrong that the percentages are all against you.

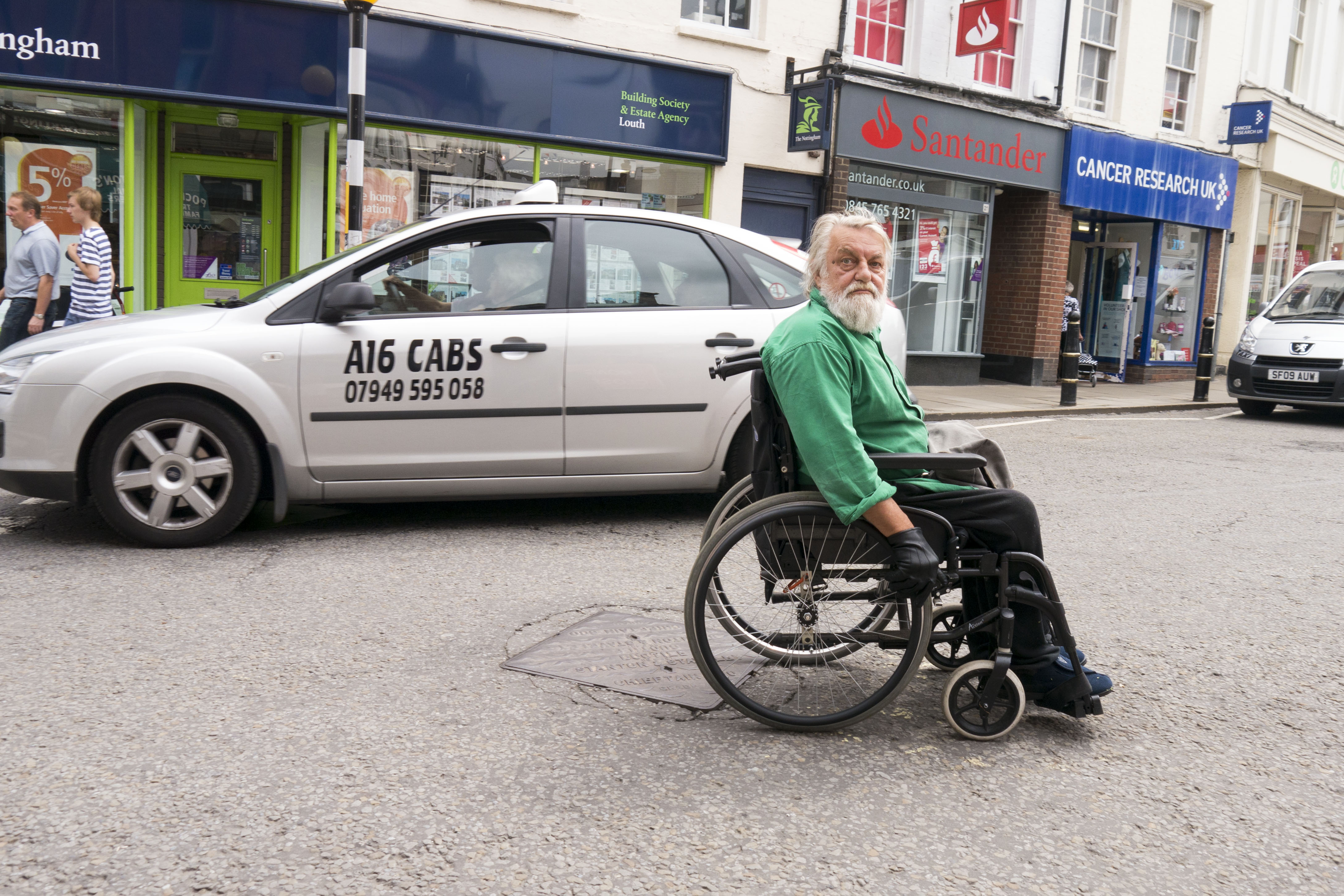
Wyatt in 2013. To date, the Drury Lane performance remains Wyatt's only headlining concert as a solo artist.

In the years since, Wyatt has never again performed live as a headliner, making the Drury Lane show the only concert in his over four-decade solo career. He has rarely performed live at all after Drury Lane, even as a guest of other musicians, in part because he developed intense stage fright. His fear of performing has even caused recurring nightmares in which Miles Davis laughs at Wyatt from offstage.

Nevertheless, Wyatt has made some live guest appearances alongside other artists. Wyatt performed onstage in the late 1970s with Henry Cow at concerts in London, Paris, and Rome, documented on the 1976 live double album Concerts. In 1981, he appeared with The Raincoats at London's Albany Theatre. Finally, at the Wyatt-curated Meltdown festival in 2001, he sang the first several verses of Pink Floyd's "Comfortably Numb" with David Gilmour—albeit from the front of the stage, not actually appearing onstage—and sang a cappella with his wife Alfie at the conclusion of the festival, crouching in a stage balcony to avoid being seen by the audience.

In 2005, Wyatt told Mojo that he would have loved to tour with the Drury Lane band but that Mason, Oldfield, and Frith made that a logistical impossibility. In an interview the same year with Record Collector magazine, Wyatt expressed some regrets about never playing live again, but noted his satisfaction with the Drury Lane performance:

I just kept trundling on and, fuck me, 30 years later, I'm still trundling on—extraordinary! ... I'm sure I could have done more gigs than that, and I do wish I had. ... I'm pretty hard on myself and curse the mistakes I've made in my life, but I'm really happy to hear this gig—that it happened at all. And I do think "blimey, that could've been a whole new thing in the 70's..."

Wyatt told his biographer Marcus O'Dair "I get a nice warm feeling from [the Drury Lane] record, I really do," and said he was "surprised at the elastic energy that sustains the whole thing." When asked about the possibility of future shows once more in 2015, Wyatt told Q it would be "undoable... appalling, just the thought of it."

== Bootlegs ==
Professional ratings
Bootleg versions
Review scores
Source	Rating
AllMusic (reviewing Sea Song)	3/5 stars

The first official recording of any music from the concert was the live version of "Calyx" on the first disc of Eps, a Wyatt box set released by Thirsty Ear Recordings in 1999. Prior to the official release of a Drury Lane live album in 2005, the concert was widely bootlegged. The first bootleg recording of the concert, titled Las Vegas Fandango, was issued on vinyl in 1981.

Bootlegs of the concert were common among aficionados; Derek Hammond of Record Collector speculated that the concert "must be one of the most bootlegged gigs ever," and several reviews of the official release alluded to the widespread distribution of bootlegged copies. AllMusic even reviewed Sea Song, a bootleg CD released sometime before 2005 identical to the version released as Las Vegas Fandango. According to AllMusic's Ted Mills, "the sound quality [on Sea Song] is dreadful, but this is a historically important document of a one-time-only event." Mills recalled the live version of "Calyx" that appeared on Eps was "in pristine condition, suggesting that a quality recording does exist," but he speculated "[p]erhaps Wyatt sees no reason to release any more from this concert."

At least four distinct bootleg versions of the concert circulated before the official release. Even after the official release of a concert recording in 2005, one previously unearthed bootleg emerged; according to Disco Robert Wyatt—a French fansite devoted to Wyatt—a bootleg titled Robert Wyatt With Friends in Concert began circulating online in MP3 format circa 2010. The newly unearthed bootleg contains material omitted from the official release, and the quality of the recording is described as generally better than the official version, aside from a minor flaw in "Calyx" and a fade-out in "I'm a Believer" before the band finished playing.

== Live album ==
=== 2005 release ===
Almost two decades after the concert, Wyatt revealed to psychedelic rock magazine Ptolemaic Terrascope that Virgin Records had "sneakily recorded [the show] and then put the cost of recording onto my bill, which I thought was a bit nasty." Wyatt later told the French magazine Rock & Folk that a complete tape of the concert survived but was damaged, with perhaps only two or three songs that were salvageable.

In 2005, Hannibal Records—a subsidiary of the then-independent record label Rykodisc—released the live album Theatre Royal Drury Lane 8th September 1974, the first officially released recording of the concert. Wyatt dedicated the album to Peel, Feza, and Windo—the three concert participants who had died before the release of the live album. The sound quality of the album drops drastically after the first set ends because portions of the original high-quality recording have been lost. The CD packaging includes a note about this on the back cover:

Warning: About half the original recording of the concert, all the stuff after Julie T's solo song ["Mind of a Child"], is "lost". So the second set is cobbled together from scraps of incomplete monitor mixes etc, and can only be described as a damage limitation exercise. But I hope that at least there's enough clearly audible music here altogether, especially in the first half, to justify this release.

In an interview, Wyatt said that some of the earlier bootlegs "simply shouldn't have" been released due to their poor sound quality, comparing them to fans searching through Bob Dylan's garbage. Still, he said he "didn't want mislead people into thinking that [the 2005 official release] was a new or perfectly formed recording."

=== Reception ===
Professional ratings
Review scores
Source	Rating
AllMusic	4/5 stars
The Guardian	2/5 stars
The Observer	5/5 stars
Record Collector	4/5 stars
PopMatters	8/10

Drury Lane received generally favorable reviews. Writing for The Observer, Simon Reynolds gave the album a perfect five stars, giving praise to the "supergroup" Wyatt assembled. Reynolds concluded that it was "[a]larming but true: one of the best releases of 2005 was recorded 31 years ago," and he later named the album among his favorite reissues of the year in The Wire's "Rewind 2005" issue. In AllMusic, Thom Jurek praised the quality of the lineup, with Wyatt in "excellent form" and the band, though "a bit ragged in places, are nonetheless tight and full of fire." According to Jurek, the album is a "tribute" to Wyatt, a "fine" gathering of Canterbury scene musicians and "as close to an essential document of 1970s experimental/prog as one is likely to find." Will Hermes wrote in Spin that, compared to the "claustrophobic poignancy" of Wyatt's studio recordings, "this polished live disc lights up a world where weirdo jazz-rock and the Monkees grope in the dark."

David Marchese, writing for PopMatters, called the album "both a welcome addition to Wyatt's catalogue and an indispensable document for anyone interested in that rare breed of musician who is forever alive to the possibility of new opportunities and forever blind to the existence of obstacles." Marchese said the performances of songs from Rock Bottom "match, if not better, their studio versions," with the other songs matching that "high level," especially the "rousing" and "epic" take on "I'm a Believer". Mike Barnes at The Wire wrote "those who have only heard the recorded songs—lush, childlike and dreamy, but with disquiet seeping in at their edges—might be surprised how strong they sound live." He praised Wyatt's choice of collaborators as a band of "exceptional musicians, who would otherwise probably not have been heard by a rock audience." According to Barnes, the sound quality is a major improvement over the bootlegged versions in circulation, though he notes the sound becomes "ragged" by the show's end. Barnes also quibbled with the omission of the free improvisation segment in the middle of the concert, cuts that he felt were made to leave time for the "pointless and irritating" hidden track.

The album received favorable notice in the French press, with positive reviews in Le Monde and Muziq (reviewed by the critic Guy Darol); the latter publication included the album on its 2008 list of "indispensable" live albums. The only conclusively negative review came from The Guardian's Dave Simpson, who called it an "eerie 1970s curio" and gave it two out of five stars. While Simpson found "some wonderful music here that showcases Wyatt's voice," he wrote that "time has not been kind" to some of the more experimental and jazz-oriented music at the concert, summing it up as "a period piece aimed at the most devoted fans."

=== 2008 reissue ===
Domino Recording Company reissued Robert Wyatt's entire album discography in 2008, including Drury Lane. Released on 28 October, Drury Lane was made available in both CD and LP format, marking the live album's first official pressing on vinyl.

Professional ratings
2008 reissue
Review scores
Source	Rating
Analogue Music Magazine	90%
Pitchfork	4.4/10
Uncut	3/5 stars

Later reviews of the live album remained generally positive but less enthusiastic overall. In the Irish music magazine Analogue, Ciarán Gaynor gave Theatre Royal Drury Lane a 90%, tying it with Rock Bottom for the highest score in Wyatt's discography. In The Wire, David Stubbs said Wyatt "can't achieve [Rock Bottom]'s full effect in a live setting, but the love in which this good and great musician is wreathed from colleagues, audience, and compère John Peel alike, is warmly palpable."

David Cavanagh of Uncut said the concert "skirts the outermost musical avant-garde at times, and gets pretty sloppy at others," but noted that the "unexpected arrangements" of songs from Rock Bottom made the album "fascinating" on the whole. Douglas Wolk at Pitchfork gave the reissue a low score—only 4.4 out of 10. While Wolk called the band "fantastic," he said "[r]egrettably, the sound quality is indifferent, and the performances don't particularly improve on their studio equivalents. It's fun for fans, but shouldn't be anybody's first (or fifth) Wyatt album."

== Track listing ==
All tracks are written by Robert Wyatt, except where noted.

No.	Title	Writer(s)	Original release	Length
1.	"Introduction by John Peel"			2:18
2.	"Dedicated to You But You Weren't Listening"	Hugh Hopper	Soft Machine's Volume Two (1969)	1:38
3.	"Memories"	Hopper	Daevid Allen's Banana Moon (1971)	3:58
4.	"Sea Song"		Rock Bottom (1974)	9:13
5.	"A Last Straw"		Rock Bottom (1974)	4:38
6.	"Little Red Riding Hood Hit the Road"		Rock Bottom (1974)	6:42
7.	"Alifie"		Rock Bottom (1974)	4:49
8.	"Alifib"		Rock Bottom (1974)	6:24
9.	"Mind of a Child"	Julie Tippetts	Julie Tippetts' Sunset Glow (1975)	5:26
10.	"Instant Pussy"		Matching Mole's Matching Mole (1972)	4:22
11.	"Signed Curtain"		Matching Mole's Matching Mole (1972)	4:42
12.	"Calyx"	Phil Miller, Wyatt	Hatfield and the North's Hatfield and the North (1974)	3:19
13.	"Little Red Robin Hood Hit the Road"		Rock Bottom (1974)	6:12
14.	"I'm a Believer"	Neil Diamond	The Monkees' single (1966); More of the Monkees (1967)	7:36
Total length:				70:54

After several minutes of silence on "I'm a Believer", there is an untitled hidden track—an alternate version of "Alife" played in reverse. Counting the silence and the hidden track, the full length of track 14 is 12:41.

== Personnel ==
Adapted from the album liner notes and Wyatt biographer Marcus O'Dair's notes:

- Robert Wyatt – lead vocalist

Friends

- John Peel – spoken voice (introduction)
- Julie Tippetts – vocals, piano (tracks 9, 10, 14)
- Ivor Cutler – vocals, baritone concertina (track 13)
- Dave Stewart – keyboards (tracks 2–8, 10–14)
- Laurie Allan – drums (tracks 2–8, 10–14)
- Hugh Hopper – bass guitar (tracks 2–8, 10–14)
- Fred Frith – violin, guitar, viola (tracks 2, 3, 6, 8, 14)
- Mongezi Feza – trumpet (tracks 6, 14)
- Gary Windo – tenor saxophone, bass clarinet (tracks 7, 14)
- Mike Oldfield – guitar, Minimoog (tracks 7, 8, 11, 13, 14)
- Nick Mason – drums (tracks 10, 11, 13, 14)

Others

- Jamie Johnson – mixing
- Phil Smee – package design
