= Eps (album) =

Compilation album by Robert Wyatt
- Released: 9 February 1999
- Recorded: 1974–1997
- Length: 98:11
- Label: Thirsty Ear Records/Domino Records

Alternative cover

Professional ratings
Review scores
Source	Rating
Allmusic	3.5/5 stars
Pitchfork Media	6.4/10

Eps is a compilation album by Robert Wyatt. Released as a box set of five CD EPs, the collection comprises recordings Wyatt made between 1974 and 1998.

== Track listing ==
Disc One: Bits
No.	Title	Length
1.	"I'm a Believer (previously unreleased extended version)"	5:00
2.	"Memories"	3:11
3.	"Yesterday Man"	3:15
4.	"Sonia (alternate version)"	4:06
5.	"Calyx (live)"	3:04

Disc Two: Pieces
No.	Title	Length
1.	"Shipbuilding (Remastered in 1998)"	3:08
2.	"Memories of You"	3:00
3.	"Round Midnight"	4:13
4.	"Pigs...(In There)"	2:41
5.	"Chairman Mao"	6:15

Disc Three: Work In Progress
No.	Title	Length
1.	"Yolanda"	4:16
2.	"Te Recuerdo Amanda"	3:36
3.	"Biko"	4:40
4.	"Amber And The Amberines"	4:11

Disc Four: Animals
No.	Title	Length
1.	"The Animals Film"	19:38

Disc Five: Remixes
No.	Title	Length
1.	"Was a Friend"	5:52
2.	"Maryan"	6:50
3.	"A Sunday in Madrid"	7:03
4.	"Free Will and Testament"	4:33
