= Garbarek =

Garbarek is a surname. Notable people with the surname include:

- Anja Garbarek (born 1970), Norwegian singer-songwriter
- Jan Garbarek (born 1947), Norwegian jazz saxophonist
