= Shrink Rap =

Shrink Rap may refer to:

- Shrink Rap (TV series), British talk show hosted by Pamela Stephenson
- "Shrink Rap" (Frasier), a season 3 episode of Frasier
- "Shrink Rap" (Las Vegas), a season 5 episode of Las Vegas
- "Shrink Rap" (Dave the Barbarian), a season 1 episode of Dave the Barbarian
- Shrink Rap, a novel by Robert B. Parker
- Shrink Rap, film starring Linden Ashby
- "Shrinkrap", a song from the 1991 album by Robert Wyatt, Dondestan

== See also ==
- Shrink wrap (disambiguation)
