= Cuckooland =

Studio album by Robert Wyatt
- Released: 29 September 2003
- Genre: Rock; jazz
- Length: 62:34
- Label: Hannibal, Rykodisc
- Producer: Robert Wyatt, Jamie Johnson

Robert Wyatt chronology
Solar Flares Burn for You (2003)	Cuckooland (2003)	Theatre Royal Drury Lane 8th September 1974 (2005)

Professional ratings
Review scores
Source	Rating
All About Jazz	(not rated)
AllMusic	4.5/5 stars
BBC	–
Pitchfork	7.6/10

Cuckooland is the eighth studio album by jazz rock artist Robert Wyatt. It was released on 29 September 2003 through Hannibal Records. The artwork is by Alfreda Benge. The Wire listed Cuckooland among the 50 best records of the year in its annual critics' poll.

== Track listing ==
All tracks composed by Robert Wyatt; except where indicated

1. "Just a Bit" – 5:09
2. "Old Europe" (Wyatt, Alfreda Benge) – 4:15
3. "Tom Hay's Fox" – 3:33
4. "Forest" (Wyatt, Alfreda Benge) – 7:55
5. "Beware" (Karen Mantler) – 5:09
6. "Cuckoo Madame" (Wyatt, Alfreda Benge) – 5:20
7. "Raining in My Heart" (Felice and Boudleaux Bryant)– 2:42
8. "Lullaby for Hamza/Silence" (Wyatt, Alfreda Benge) – 5:00
9. "Trickle Down" – 6:47
10. "Insensatez" (Vinicius de Moraes, Antônio Carlos Jobim) – 4:24
11. "Mister E" (Karen Mantler) – 4:20
12. "Lullaloop" (Alfreda Benge) – 2:59
13. "Life Is Sheep" (Karen Mantler) – 4:14
14. "Foreign Accents" – 3:48
15. "Brian the Fox" – 5:31
16. "La Ahada Yalam (No-One Knows) (Nizar Zreik)" – 4:16

== Notes ==
"Just a Bit" is dedicated to Richard Dawkins.

"Old Europe" is about Juliette Gréco and Miles Davis.

"Lullaby for Hamza" is followed by 30 seconds of silence, to provide in Wyatt's words, "A suitable place for those with tired ears to pause and resume listening later".

== Personnel ==
- Robert Wyatt - Percussion, Piano, Trumpet, Cornet, Cymbals, Drums, Keyboards, Vocals
- Karen Mantler - Harmonica, Piano, Keyboards, Vocals
- Phil Manzanera - Vocals
- Alfreda Benge - Vocals
- Brian Eno - Vocals
- David Gilmour - Guitar on "Forest"
- Paul Weller - Guitar
- Annie Whitehead - Trombone
- Gilad Atzmon - Alto, Soprano, and Tenor Saxophones, Clarinet, Flute
- Jamie Johnson - Bass Guitar, Vocals
- Yaron Stavi - Double Bass
- Jennifer Maidman - Acoustic guitar, Accordion
