= Laurie Allan =

English drummer (born 1943)

- Born: 19 February 1943 (age 82); London, England
- Occupation: Musician
- Instrument: Drums
- Years active: 1960s–1980s
- Formerly of: Delivery, Gong

Laurie Allan (born 19 February 1943) is an English drummer, best known for stints in Delivery and Gong.

== Biography ==
Allan started drumming when he was 12. His professional career got going in the early 1960s. He was in The First Real Poetry Band with Pete Brown (vocals), John McLaughlin (guitar), Binky McKenzie (bass), and Pete Bailey (percussion).

In 1967, he recorded with Chris McGregor, Dudu Pukwana, Ronnie Beer, and Coleridge Goode on Gwigwi Mrwebi's Mbaqanga Songs. By 1968, he was in the Gunter Hampel trio with John McLaughlin when he met Daevid Allen. He played with Gunter Hampel at the 1968 International Essen Song Day, alongside Bruno Besse (Guitar), Freddy Gosseye (Bass) Simon Prestvitch (Fluid Lights) and Raoul Kroes (Techn.). He played in Formerly Fat Harry in 1970.

In 1971, Allan joined Delivery with British keyboardist Steve Miller, replacing Pip Pyle who went on to join Gong. In 1972, Allan then joined Gong, again replacing Pyle. Allan left Gong in 1973 to join a new Delivery line-up, but this was short-lived and soon broke up; Allan did appear on Miller and Lol Coxhill's The Story So Far/Oh Really? album (1974). He provided drums and percussion on Ralph McTell's album Not till Tomorrow (1972) and Bert Jansch's album Moonshine (1973).

Allan also played with Robert Wyatt, for example on his albums Rock Bottom and Ruth Is Stranger Than Richard, and he was previously in a relationship with artist Alfie Benge before she married Wyatt.

Allan re-joined Gong briefly in 1974 and maintained a connection with the band for some year afterward, including working with Mother Gong in 1978. He played with Barbara Thompson's Paraphernalia (1974–75). Allan also worked with Peter Lemer in the 1970s, but he largely left performing in the 1980s.
