= Elledge =

Elledge is a surname. Notable people with the surname include:

- Jacqueline Elledge (born 1937), English cricketer
- James Homer Elledge (1942–2001), American murderer
- Jimmy Elledge (1943–2012), American country musician
- Jonn Elledge (born 1980), English journalist and author
- Seth Elledge (born 1996), American baseball player
- Stephen Elledge (born 1956), American geneticist

== See also ==
- Mark Ellidge (1940–2010), British photographer
