= Grasscut =

English musical group

Grasscut are a musical group featuring composer/producer Andrew Phillips and musician/writer Marcus O'Dair. Phillips writes and produces all Grasscut music; he also sings and plays various instruments including guitar and keyboards. O'Dair manages the act and contributes keyboards and double bass. They are based in Brighton, England.

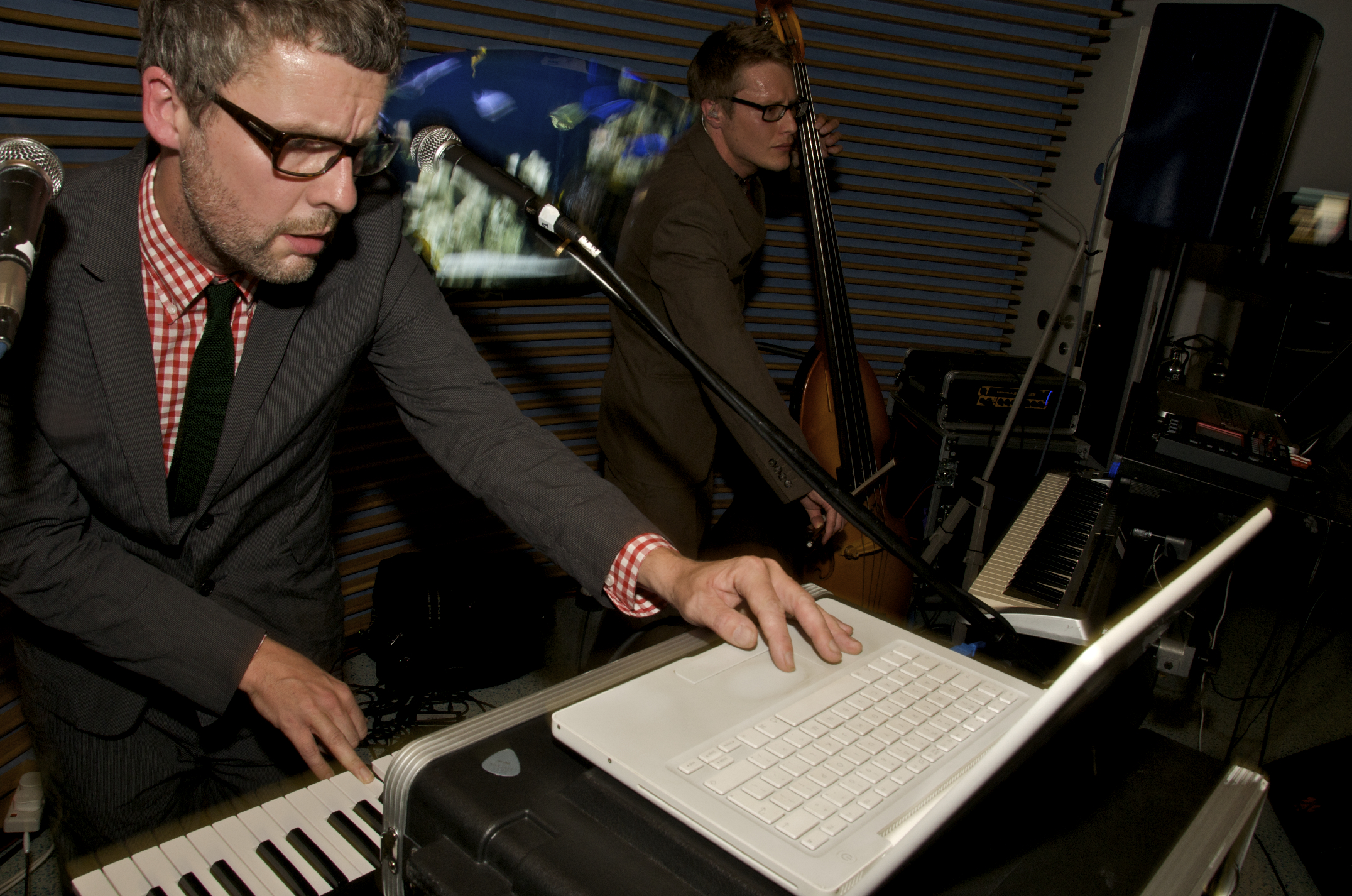
Grasscut (2009)

== History ==
Grasscut have released two albums on Ninja Tune, 1 inch: 1/2 Mile (2010) and Unearth (2012). Their third album, Everyone Was a Bird, was released by Lo Recordings in 2015. Contributors to Grasscut's albums include Robert Wyatt, John Surman, Adrian Crowley, Gazelle Twin, Seb Rochford, Oddfellows Casino, and Elisabeth Nygård. Grasscut have remixed artists including Bonobo, Coldcut Jaga Jazzist, Leo Abrahams, and John Metcalfe; in turn, they have been remixed by Bibio Nathan Fake and Penguin Cafe.

=== 1 Inch: ½ Mile ===
Following the release of 1 Inch: ½ Mile, Clash magazine described Grasscut as "genuinely daring electronica artists", with the album appearing as Mojo magazine’s electronica album of the month, one of iDJ’s debut albums of the year and one of the top ten pop albums of the year according to the Sunday Telegraph. Speaking to the Quietus website, Tom Robinson of BBC 6 Music named it one of his top 13 albums of all time

=== Unearth ===
According to Andy Gill of The Independent, Grasscut's second album, Unearth, should have been on the Mercury list. Both records won 5-star reviews from the Telegraph; support has also come from the Sunday Times, Word, Uncut, Time Out, Q and Clash. They have had airplay from BBC Radio 1, 2, 3, BBC Radio 5 Live and BBC Radio 6 Music, and have played sessions on 6Music and XFM.

=== Everyone Was a Bird ===
In May 2015 Grasscut released their third studio album titled Everyone Was a Bird. The album has been described by Clash as "an engrossing, artful work", and by The Quietus as "that rare slab of post-rock that uses the genre's textures and general ethos of exploration to create new sounds instead of rehashing old ones". The album features guest vocals from Adrian Crowley and Seamus Fogarty and strings by Emma Smith and Vince Sipprell. The liner notes were written by acclaimed landscape writer Robert Macfarlane and were premiered on the website Caught by the River in April 2015.

=== Everyone Was a Bird - Remixed ===
In March 2016, online magazine The Quietus announced Grasscut's fourth album was to be a remix album. The album includes remixes from artists including Mira Calix, John Metcalfe, Leo Abrahams and Penguin Cafe, and was released on Lo Recordings in the UK and Sounds et al. in the US.

== Live show ==
Since opening the main stage at the Big Chill festival in 2009, Grasscut have performed at Cecil Sharp House, Union Chapel, the ICA, Koko and Tate Britain, as well as in France, Germany, Belgium, Holland, Czech Republic, Portugal, Poland and Slovakia. They have shared stages with the likes of Kronos Quartet, Silver Apples, Caribou, Fink and Bonobo. Although they performed early shows as a duo, Grasscut have usually been joined onstage by drummer Aram Zarikian (Andreya Triana) and string player Emma Smith (Geese, Elysian Quartet, Jon Hopkins, James Yorkston, Imogen Heap, Hot Chip). They are also known for their use of visuals, originally developed with As Described (Portishead, Cinematic Orchestra).

== Link to landscape ==
Grasscut are known for their landscape-based concepts, usually emerging in collaboration with Pedr Browne (also responsible for the Grasscut artwork). 1 Inch: ½ Mile came with a map detailing a walk through the ‘lost’ village of Balsdean, just outside Brighton. An audio clue, contained within a downloadable track, provided details of the location of a hidden artefact: a unique recording on a cassette. This idea was extended on Grasscut's second album, Unearth. Each track was reimagined by Phillips, and these ‘shadow’ versions – again on cassette – were secreted, each with a Walkman, in specific locations around England and Wales.

== Use in media ==
Grasscut's music has been used on the soundtracks of The New Pope, Waterloo Road, and Continuum. Their music has also been used by BBC, Channel 4, and in major advertising campaigns worldwide.

Grasscut's hit single "The Lights - M25 Version" was featured in K-Mart's annual Christmas commercials and advertising during the 2012 holiday shopping season.

== Discography ==
=== Albums ===
- 1 Inch: 1/2 Mile (Ninja Tune, 2010)
- Unearth (Ninja Tune, 2012)
- Unearth Shadow Version (Ninja Tune, 2012)
- Everyone Was A Bird (Lo Recordings, 2015)
- Everyone Was A Bird - Remixed (Lo Recordings/Sounds et al., 2016)
- Overwinter (Lo Recordings, 2021)
- Haunts (Lo Recordings, 2021)

=== Singles ===
- High Down (Ninja Tune, 2009)
- The Door in the Wall (Ninja Tune, 2010)
- Muppet (Ninja Tune, 2010)
- From Towns & Fields (Ninja Tune, 2012)
- Pieces (Ninja Tune, 2012)
- Catholic Architecture (Lo Recordings, 2014)
- Curlews (Lo Recordings, 2015)
- Radar (Lo Recordings, 2015)

=== Remixes by Grasscut ===
- Voluntary Butler Scheme – Trading Things In (2009)
- Bonobo ft Andreya Triana: The Keeper – Bitter Peace remix (Ninja Tune, 2010)
- Jaga Jazzist: Toccata (Ninja Tune, 2010)
- Coldcut: Sound Mirrors (Ninja Tune, 2010)
- Crewdson: Mime (Slowfoot, 2010)
- Spokes: 3, 4, 5 (Counter, 2011)
- Brasstronaut: Hearts Trompet (Tri-Tone, 2011)
- Zoon Van Snook: Shall He? Shanty (Mush Records, 2012)
- Tim Bowness: Smiler at 52 (There Were Days Grasscut Remix) (Inside Out Music, 2014)
- Nick Nicely: London South (Lo Recordings, 2015)

=== Remixes of Grasscut ===
- Nathan Fake: Muppet (Ninja Tune, 2010)
- Bibio: The Door In The Wall (Ninja Tune, 2010)
- Prdctv: The Door In The Wall (Ninja Tune, 2010)

=== Other ===
- Blink In The Night: Ninja Tune XX box set (Ninja Tune, 2010)
