= Neville Whitehead =

Neville Whitehead may refer to:

- Neville Whitehead (bassist), New Zealand jazz bassist and luthier
- Nick Whitehead, real name Neville Whitehead, (1933–2002), Welsh sprinter
