= Peter Blackman =

British civil rights activist, writer and communist (1909–1993)

- Born: 28 June 1909; Saint John, Barbados
- Died: 8 August 1993
- Occupations: Christian missionary, newspaper editor, BBC Radio broadcaster, airplane manufacturer
- Organization(s): League of Coloured Peoples, Negro Welfare Association
- Known for: Black civil rights and communist activism
- Notable work: My Song Is For All Men (1952); "In Memory of Claudia Jones"; Footprints (2013); "Stalingrad"
- Political party: Communist Party of Great Britain

Peter Blackman (28 June 1909 – 8 August 1993) was a Caribbean communist, scholar, civil rights activist, and Christian missionary. After challenging a racist rule in which white missionaries earned more than their black counterparts, Blackman resigned as a priest and dedicated himself to both communism and black civil rights activism. He was a key member of the Negro Welfare Association and the League of Coloured Peoples, and an active member of the Communist Party of Great Britain (CPGB). During his career as a Communist Party activist, he became close friends with American civil rights leaders Paul Robeson and W. E. B. Du Bois. Blackman worked as a radio broadcaster for the British Broadcasting Company (BBC) during the Second World War for their Caribbean services; however, in 1950 he was fired from his job for having communist beliefs. Afterwards, he joined the National Union of Railwaymen (NUR) and volunteered to write letters for people with learning disabilities. In his later life he dedicated his time to writing poetry.

== Early life and education ==
Blackman was born in Saint John, Barbados, in 1909, his mother was a laundress and his father was a stonemason, all of whom lived in one of the poorest parts of Barbados. Their family lived on the grounds of a Caribbean Anglican Church, which influenced Blackman's religious beliefs at a young age.

The church provided Blackman with an education of a far higher quality than most of his black peers in Barbados were able to access, and he was given an education at Harrison College, where he learned Latin, Greek and French, and also was educated in theology. He later attended Durham University where he obtained a degree in divinity.

== Anglican priesthood ==
Blackman became an Anglican in 1933, and was sent as a missionary to the country of Gambia in 1935. Soon he realised that black priests such as himself were being paid less than their white counterparts as a part of a racist rule upheld by church officials. Not only were black priests paid less but they were also being forced to sit at the back of churches during services. Blackman attempted to fight this racist rule, though he did not succeed in overturning it. As a result, he returned to Barbados and resigned from the priesthood.

== Life in Britain ==
=== Joining the Communist Party of Great Britain (CPGB) ===
In 1937, Blackman moved back to Britain and chose to live in London, where he threw himself into African-related political issues. He became the editor of The Keys, the journal of the League of Coloured Peoples. He also joined the communist-led Negro Welfare Association and the Communist Party of Great Britain (CPGB). Blackman spent much of his time at the CPGB headquarters on King Street, London, and was asked to work on the party's Colonial Information Bulletin.

=== Second World War ===
During World War II, Blackman worked in a factory that made parts for Vickers Wellington airplanes for the Royal Air Force, where he was promoted to the position of factory floor manager. His skills as a writer were noticed by the British Broadcasting Company (BBC), who hired him to help the BBC's Caribbean radio broadcast services in the West Indies. Blackman continued to work on BBC radio broadcast services until 1950, when he was fired for his political beliefs.

After the war, Blackman became an engine fitter for the Willesen Works railway and became active in the National Union of Railwaymen (NUR). He gained fame within the NUR for helping workers with learning difficulties write letters.

Blackman continued to work as an active member of the CPGB throughout the 1940s and 1950s; however, at an unknown date during the 1960s, he left the party, due to feelings that his talents were not being fully utilised. Despite leaving the CPGB, he remained a lifelong socialist and trade unionist.

== Arts career ==
In 1949, American entertainer and civil rights leader Paul Robeson toured Britain, during which the CPGB suggested that Blackman organise Robeson's tours and that the two black civil rights activists travel together. Blackman accompanied Robeson on his travels across Europe, and the two attended the World Peace Congress in Paris, France, where Blackman met American black civil rights leader, W. E. B. Du Bois. Blackman wrote the long poem My Song Is For All (published by Lawrence & Wishart, 1952), during these travels across Europe, after being inspired by his visit to the site of the Warsaw Ghetto.

In homage to fellow communist and civil rights leader Claudia Jones, Blackman wrote "In Memory of Claudia Jones", and in a tribute to the Soviet Red Army wrote "Stalingrad".

In 1979, Blackman read his poem "Stalingrad" (about the Soviet Union's fight against Nazi Germany during the Battle of Stalingrad) to an enthusiastic audience that included Jack Dash, a famous communist trade unionist and leader of many British dock workers. After hearing Blackman perform "Stalingrad", the musician Robert Wyatt convinced him to record it. Blackman's recording of "Stalingrad" was the B-side of Wyatt's 1981 single "Stalin Wasn't Stallin'", a cover of a Golden Gate Jubilee Quartet song that was originally released in the 1940s during World War II. Wyatt covered the song to remind the Western world that although they were foes of the Soviets during the Cold War during the 1980s, they had been their allies against the bigger enemy of the Nazis during World War II in the 1940s, when the Golden Gate Jubilee Quartet wrote and recorded the original "Stalin Wasn't Stallin'", the lyrics including praise for the Soviet people and especially Joseph Stalin (then Soviet leader and namesake of the city of Stalingrad, where the battle took place) for their deeds during the Nazi invasion of their country. Blackman's poem "Stalingrad" was included to further drive the message home. "Stalingrad" later ended up on the album Nothing Can Stop Us (1982), which compiled Wyatt's singles from the early 1980s.

== Death and legacy ==
Blackman died in 1993. After his death, a book containing a collection of his works, titled Footprints, was published.

In 1994, a conference was held in honour of Blackman, attended by teachers, local historians, activists and students.

== Bibliography ==
- My Song is for All Men, Lawrence & Wishart, 1952
- Footprints, Smokestack Books, 2013. ISBN 9780957172289

== See also ==
- Trevor Carter
- Billy Strachan
- Claudia Jones
- Olive Morris
- Henry Gunter
- Dorothy Kuya
- Len Johnson
