= Shleep =

Studio album by Robert Wyatt
- Released: 26 September 1997
- Recorded: 1996–1997
- Venues: Phil Manzanera's Gallery Studio, Chertsey
- Genres: Progressive rock; art rock; Canterbury scene; experimental rock
- Length: 53:39
- Labels: Hannibal, Thirsty Ear
- Producers: Alfreda Benge, Brian Eno, Robert Wyatt

Robert Wyatt chronology
A Short Break (1992)	Shleep (1997)	Dondestan (Revisited) (1998)

Professional ratings
Review scores
Source	Rating
AllMusic	4.5/5 stars
NME	8/10
Pitchfork	8.6/10
Rolling Stone	3.5/5 stars
Uncut	3/5 stars

Shleep is the seventh studio album by English musician Robert Wyatt, released on 26 September 1997.

The album brought together a diverse range of musicians from a range of genres. After Wyatt's largely one-man recordings of the 1980s, Shleep marked a return to featuring other artists as on his 1970s albums; the balance of his discography would follow suit. The Wire named Shleep its record of the year in its annual critics' poll.

== Reception ==
Trouser Press said, "Brian Eno, Phil Manzanera and Paul Weller are only the best known of the contributors to Shleep, a more personal (i.e., less political) and intermittently more ambitious undertaking than Dondestan. The flighty horns on half the tracks lend more of a jazzy tone than is needed to the proceedings. Given its creative circumstances, Shleep is something of a missed opportunity, but it’s still one of Wyatt's most entertaining and involving efforts."

== Track listing ==
All tracks composed by Robert Wyatt and Alfreda Benge, except where indicated.

1. "Heaps of Sheeps" – 4:56
2. "The Duchess" (Wyatt) – 4:18
3. "Maryan" (Wyatt, Philip Catherine) – 6:11
4. "Was a Friend" (Wyatt, Hugh Hopper) – 6:09
5. "Free Will and Testament" (Wyatt, Mark Kramer) – 4:13
6. "September the Ninth" – 6:41
7. "Alien" – 6:47
8. "Out of Season" – 2:32
9. "A Sunday in Madrid" – 4:41
10. "Blues in Bob Minor" (Wyatt) – 5:46
11. "The Whole Point of No Return" (Paul Weller) – 1:25
12. "September in the Rain" (bonus re-release track) – 2:31

== Personnel ==
- Gary Azukx - djembe
- Alfreda Benge - voice of the apparition, chorus
- Philip Catherine - guitar
- Brian Eno - synthesiser, synthesiser bass, vocal chorus
- Jamie Johnson - guitar, chorus
- Phil Manzanera - guitar
- Chucho Merchán - bass guitar, double bass, bass drum, percussion
- Evan Parker - soprano saxophone, tenor saxophone
- Charles Rees - chorus
- Chikako Sato - violin
- Paul Weller - guitars, harmony vocals
- Annie Whitehead - trombone
- Robert Wyatt - voice, keyboards, bass guitar, polish fiddle, trumpet, percussion, chorus
