= Stalin Wasn't Stallin' =

1943 song performed by the Golden Gate Jubilee Quartet; covered by Robert Wyatt in 1981

Song by the Golden Gate Jubilee Quartet
- Released: 1943 (US)
- Recorded: 1943
- Genre: A cappella
- Songwriter(s): Willie Johnson

"Stalin Wasn't Stallin'"

Single by Robert Wyatt

from the album Nothing Can Stop Us
- B-side: "Stalingrad"
- Released: 1981
- Recorded: 1981
- Genre: A cappella
- Label: Rough Trade
- Songwriter(s): Willie Johnson
- Producer(s): Robert Wyatt

Robert Wyatt singles chronology
| "At Last I'm Free" (1980) | "Stalin Wasn't Stallin'" (1981) | "Grass" (1981) |

"Stalin Wasn't Stallin' (A Modern Spiritual)" was a song written in 1943 by Willie Johnson and originally recorded by the a cappella gospel group the Golden Gate Jubilee Quartet (of which Johnson was a member) in 1943. Robert Wyatt recorded a cover of the song in 1980.

== Background ==
"Stalin Wasn't Stallin'" was written during World War II, and praises the efforts of Joseph Stalin in his stand against Adolf Hitler's invasion of the Soviet Union. United States president Franklin D. Roosevelt had declared in a 28 July 1943 speech that:

The world has never seen greater devotion, determination, and self sacrifice, that have been displayed by the Russian people and their armies under the leadership of Marshal Joseph Stalin.

The United States and the Soviet Union were co-belligerents during the war and many decisive battles occurred between the Soviets and Germany that changed the direction of the war.

== Original recording ==
The Golden Gate Jubilee Quartet spoke (or sermonized) the lyrics of the song against a rhythm of back-up vocals. It was a moderate hit in 1943. It has since appeared on several compilation records, including Gospel Greats: 60 Legendary Performances (The Soho Collection, 2005).

== Covers ==
Robert Wyatt covered the song in 1980, emulating an a cappella group by singing in four-part harmony (achieved by multi-tracking). Wyatt's interest in the song was that he wanted to remind the West of the selective memory they had during the Cold War about this earlier alliance. The cover was released as a single in 1981 with "Stalingrad", a poem about the Battle of Stalingrad, written and read by Peter Blackman, on the "B" side. "Stalin Wasn't Stallin'" and "Stalingrad" also appeared on Wyatt's 1982 album Nothing Can Stop Us. Wyatt had heard Blackman recite the poem in 1979 to an enthusiastic audience that apart from Wyatt, also included Jack Dash, a famous communist trade unionist and leader of many British dock workers. When Blackman was finished, Wyatt convinced him to record it and this was the recording that ended up in the single and album.
