= Old Rottenhat =

Studio album by Robert Wyatt
- Released: November 1985
- Recorded: 1984–1985
- Studio: West 3, Acton, London; Acre Lane, Brixton, London
- Genre: Canterbury scene; art rock
- Length: 43:49
- Label: Rough Trade

Robert Wyatt chronology
The Animals Film (1982)	Old Rottenhat (1985)	Dondestan (1991)

Old Rottenhat is the fourth studio album by Robert Wyatt. It was released in November 1985, and in 1993 it was reissued in its entirety as part of the CD Mid-Eighties. The album was produced and performed solo by Wyatt, and is dedicated to Michael Bettaney, a UK MI5 intelligence officer who in 1984 was convicted for acting as an agent-in-place for the Soviet Union.

== Critical reception ==
Professional ratings
Review scores
Source	Rating
AllMusic	3/5 stars
Robert Christgau	B−
Pitchfork	6.1/10

The New York Times wrote that, "while the tunes are low-key, they often have surprising rhythmic shifts or twists of chromatic harmony." David Fricke of Rolling Stone found the lyrics pedantic in comparison to those of Nothing Can Stop Us, but considered the album musically effective, praising the tracks "The Age of Self" and "Gharbzadegi".

Trouser Press said, "The completely self-penned Old Rottenhat is a perceptive, beautifully performed and ultimately bleak view of ongoing political struggle, more specific than Nothing Can Stop Us but no less emotive. Though many of Wyatt's lyrics veer towards the doctrinaire, his singing is as quietly passionate as ever."

== Track listing ==
All songs written by Robert Wyatt

=== Side one ===
1. "Alliance" – 4:24
2. "The United States of Amnesia" – 5:50
3. "East Timor" – 2:52
4. "Speechless" – 3:37
5. "The Age of Self" – 2:50
6. "Vandalusia" – 2:44

=== Side two ===
1. "The British Road" – 6:23
2. "Mass Medium" – 4:43
3. "Gharbzadegi" – 7:54
4. "P.L.A." – 2:31

== Personnel ==
- Robert Wyatt: vocals, piano, keyboards, bass, percussion

== Recording details ==
- Recorded in 1984 at West 3 Studios, Acton, London, by John McGowan.
- Recorded in 1985 at Acre Lane Studios, Brixton, by Bill Gilonis.

"Thanks to Charles Gray and Vicky Aspinall for invaluable help and advice and thanks Duncan".

== Album cover ==
The artwork for the album cover was created by Wyatt's wife Alfreda Benge.
