= Nothing Can Stop Us (album) =

Compilation album by Robert Wyatt
- Released: March 1982
- Recorded: 1980–1981
- Genre: Progressive rock; pop rock
- Length: 39:51
- Label: Rough Trade
- Producer: Various

Robert Wyatt chronology
The Animals Film (1982)	Nothing Can Stop Us (1982)	Old Rottenhat (1985)

Official audio
- "Born Again Cretin" on YouTube

Nothing Can Stop Us is a compilation album by Robert Wyatt released in 1982.

== Concept ==
Consisting primarily of tracks released as singles and B-sides during the late 1970s and early 1980s, it only contains one Wyatt composition (the opening track "Born Again Cretin"). The rest of the songs are cover versions, a selection of musically and thematically disparate songs by a very varied collection of original artists, including Ivor Cutler, 1940s protest songs, Billie Holiday, "The Red Flag", and Spanish-language numbers (including a version of "Caimanera/Guantanamera"). There is a rendition of Chic's "At Last I Am Free".

The two songs not previously issued as singles are "Born Again Cretin" (taken from an NME compilation cassette) and "The Red Flag" (which was previously unreleased.) This was the only full-length LP released by Wyatt in the ten years between Ruth Is Stranger Than Richard (1975) and his fourth solo studio album Old Rottenhat (1985)

In 1979, Peter Blackman read his poem Stalingrad (about the Soviet Union's fight against Nazi Germany during the Battle of Stalingrad) to an enthusiastic audience that included Jack Dash, a famous communist trade unionist and leader of many British dock workers. After hearing Blackman perform the poem, Wyatt convinced him to record it. The recording ended up as the B-side of Wyatt's 1981 single Stalin Wasn't Stallin', a cover of a Golden Gate Jubilee Quartet song about the Nazi invasion of the Soviet Union. The lyrics of which praise the Soviet people and especially Joseph Stalin (the Soviet leader of the time and namesake of the city of Stalingrad, where the battle happened) for fighting back against the Nazi invaders. Wyatt recorded the cover to remind the Western World that although they were enemies of the Soviet Union during the Cold War during the 1980s, they were allies of them against the bigger enemy of the Nazis during World War II in the 1940s when the Golden Gate Jubilee Quartet wrote and recorded the original Stalin Wasn't Stallin.

== Release ==
Although Nothing Can Stop Us came out on cassette in the U.S. in 1982, it went unreleased on LP there until 1986, when Gramavision Records put it out with a somewhat different tracklist and sequence from its British release. It also has a different cover, a reproduction of the "Shipbuilding" single's picture sleeve. Wyatt's cover of "Shipbuilding," which features its songwriters, Elvis Costello and Clive Langer, as both guest performers and producers, leads off the album. An instrumental version of the jazz standard "Memories of You" and "Round Midnight" closes each side, and "Stalingrad" was dropped.

In 1994, the original version became available on CD paired with Old Rottenhat under the title Compilation.

== Reception and later recordings ==
Professional ratings
Review scores
Source	Rating
AllMusic	4.5/5 stars
Robert Christgau	B+
Pitchfork Media	8.4/10

The song "Born Again Cretin" is sampled in the 1999 Italian single "Re-Born Again Cretin" by Almamegretta and Dub Colossus, featuring the vocals of Julianna, which originally appeared on the 1998 album Robert Wyatt e Noi - The Different You, a compilation on CPI Records.

Trouser Press said, "Though basically a singles compilation with only one original composition, [it] is a cohesive and incredibly moving statement, with Wyatt's fragile, plaintive vocals breathing new life (and political content) into material as diverse as Chic's "At Last I Am Free", and the obscure American gospel tune "Stalin Wasn't Stallin'". Though Wyatt personally adheres to a fairly ruthless strain of Stalinism, you’d never know it from the compassion and empathy that radiate from every groove of this record."

== Track listing ==
1. "Born Again Cretin" (Robert Wyatt) – 3:10
2. "At Last I Am Free" (Nile Rodgers, Bernard Edwards) – 4:17
3. "Caimanera" (Carlos Puebla, Joseíto Fernández) - 5:18
4. "Grass" (Ivor Cutler) – 2:39
5. "Stalin Wasn't Stallin'" (Willie Johnson) – 3:22
6. "Shipbuilding" (Elvis Costello, Clive Langer) - 3:06 (Bonus track added to reissues after 1983)
7. "Red Flag" (Traditional; arranged by Jim Connell) – 3:09
8. "Strange Fruit" (Lewis Allan)– 3:37
9. "Arauco" (Violeta Parra) – 4:35
10. "Trade Union" (Abdus Salique) – 3:44
11. "Stalingrad" (Peter Blackman) – 5:46

== Personnel ==
- Robert Wyatt - vocals
- Mogotsi Mothle - double bass on "At Last I Am Free" and "Strange Fruit"
- Frank Roberts - keyboards on "At Last I Am Free" and "Strange Fruit"
- Bill MacCormick - bass on "Caimanera" and "Arauco"
- Harry Beckett - flugelhorn on "Caimanera"
- Kadir Durvesh - shehnai on "Grass" and "Trade Union"
- Esmail Shek - tabla on "Grass" and "Trade Union"

== Album cover ==
The sleeve artwork is by Wyatt's wife Alfreda Benge.
