= Dondestan =

Studio album by Robert Wyatt
- Released: 22 October 1991 (Note: The revisited version of Dondestan was released in 1998.)
- Recorded: February 1991
- Studio: Chapel Studios, South Thoresby, Lincolnshire
- Genre: Jazz; pop; progressive rock
- Label: Rough Trade (Note: The revisited version of Dondestan was released by Hannibal, Thirsty Ear.)

Robert Wyatt chronology
Old Rottenhat (1985)	Dondestan (1991)	Shleep (1997)

Dondestan is the fifth studio album by Robert Wyatt, released on 22 October 1991 on Rough Trade Records. The title is a phonetic rendition of the Spanish expression "Donde están", translated as "nowhere" and "where are they". The cover art is by Wyatt's wife, Alfreda Benge.

In 1998, the album was re-released on Hannibal Records with a new mix and track order under the title Dondestan (Revisited). This was deemed necessary as the original project had gone over budget and had been mixed and released in "an exhausted rush".

== Music ==
Dondestan fuses such genres as jazz, pop, and progressive rock; remote from the contemporary trends. The songs are minimalistic, sometimes featuring slightly brushed cymbals and a snare drum, as well as elementary keyboards, piano, and organ.

Lyrically, AllMusic review divided the album into a more abstract co-written with Alfreda Benge, while the other compositions went into a more politically oriented direction, "dealing with concerns such as Palestine, privatization, and the Communist Party", as well as abstract reflections on postmodern life ("N.I.O."). Wyatt delivers his lyrics with an "understated melancholy and subtle humor".

== Critical reception ==
Professional ratings
Review scores
Source	Rating
AllMusic	4/5 stars
Rolling Stone	3/5 stars
AllMusic (revisited)	4/5 stars
Pitchfork (revisited)	4.8/10

AllMusic's Richie Unterberger deemed Dondestan to be "appealing enough that it may take a while for the subversive lyrical ideas to make themselves apparent". Thom Jurek, the AllMusic reviewer for the revisited version, remarked on the "fitting" change to the track order, which places the more poetic songs co-written with Benge in the middle of the recording, acting as "bridges to Wyatt's political notions". When comparing the two versions, Jurek concluded that certain tracks, such as "Sight of the Wind", "Worship", and "Lisp Service", have been improved in the revisited version, gaining "ambient textures that were all but inaudible on the original, [...] making something already somewhat ethereal into a work almost ghostly with its hovering presence." Jurek considers the album to be a "great work of art a sublime one".

In a mixed review, Ira Robbins, writing for Rolling Stone, thought Dondestan takes "homey minimalism to the brink of creative indolence". Robbins liked the album's instrumental, written mostly in minor key and bringing "gentle gusts of melancholy bearing a chilly afternoon drizzle". However, Robbins didn't feel the lyrics written by Wyatt evoked "equal or even corresponding resonance", describing them as leaning "effetely Marxward, into vague musings like 'CP Jeebies', a wan consideration of Communist party factionalism, and 'Lisp Service', a gentle pox on imperialism". On the other hand, Robbins praised Benge's lyrics painting a "tableaux of nature and religion" and engaging the music as "sounds rather than visions". She singled out "Shrinkrap" as her highlight, an entertaining "whimsy about the cost of analysis, in the style of Ian Dury". She summarized Dondestan as "crude juvenilia in an oasis of intelligence and understatement".

Douglas Wolk of Pitchfork, comparing Dondestan to Wyatt's previous album Old Rottenhat, felt that both of them suffered from "on-the-fly production and chintzy keyboard presets", which made them sound like a "preliminary demo rather than something meant to be listened to". The problem that "redoubled on Dondestan", however, he felt that some of the songs are "a bit livelier than Old Rottenhat".

Both Wolk and Robbins considered the title track to be tedious with "a nagging piano melody" layered with lyrics "Palestine's a country or at least used to be" repeated "ad nauseam".

== Legacy ==
According to Pitchfork, this album is partially responsible for inspiring "the practice of 'Wyatting'"—using public "jukeboxes and playing something that totally kills the mood".

== Track listing ==
1. "Costa" (Robert Wyatt, Alfreda Benge) - 4:39
2. "The Sight Of The Wind" (Robert Wyatt, Alfreda Benge) – 4:58
3. "Catholic Architecture" (Robert Wyatt, Alfreda Benge) – 5:10
4. "Worship" (Robert Wyatt, Alfreda Benge) – 4:50
5. "Shrinkrap" (Robert Wyatt, Alfreda Benge) – 3:52
6. "CP Jeebies" (Robert Wyatt) – 4:04
7. "Left On Man" (Robert Wyatt) – 3:31
8. "Lisp Service" (Robert Wyatt, music: Hugh Hopper) – 2:10
9. "N.I.O. (New Information Order)" (Robert Wyatt) – 6:35
10. "Dondestan" (Robert Wyatt) – 4:49

=== Revisited listing ===
1. "CP Jeebies" – 4:04
2. "N.I.O. (New Information Order)" – 6:37
3. "Dondestan" – 5:01
4. "Sight Of The Wind" – 4:57
5. "Shrinkrap" – 3:51
6. "Catholic Architecture" – 5:02
7. "Worship" – 5:52
8. "Costa (Memories Of Under-Development)" – 4:09
9. "Left On Man" – 3:31
10. "Lisp Service" – 2:13

== Personnel ==
- Robert Wyatt - tracks 1, 2, 3, 9
- Wyatt (music) and Alfreda Benge (lyrics) - tracks 4, 5, 6, 7, 8
- Hugh Hopper (music) and Wyatt (lyrics) - track 10
