= Shrink wrap (disambiguation) =

Shrink wrap is a polymer plastic film which shrinks tightly over whatever it is covering when heated, commonly used as an overwrap for packaging.

Shrink wrap may also refer to:

- Shrinkwrap (contract law), a type of license agreement or other terms and conditions which can only be read and accepted by the consumer after opening the product
- "Shrink Wrap", an episode of the sitcom The King of Queens
- Shrink Wrap (Dexter), an episode of the American television series Dexter

== See also ==
- Shrink Rap (disambiguation)
- Shrinkwrapped (disambiguation)
- Plastic wrap
- Stretch wrap
