= Mid-Eighties =

1993 compilation album by Robert Wyatt

Mid-Eighties is a 1993 compilation album by Robert Wyatt that contains various tracks from that period, including the whole of his 1985 album Old Rottenhat, and his 1984 EP Work in Progress.

It is issued by Gramavision and Rough Trade Records and distributed by Rhino Records.

== Track listing ==
1. "Yolanda" – 4:12
2. "Te Recuerdo Amanda" (Victor Jara) – 3:33
3. "Biko" (Peter Gabriel) – 4:38
4. "Amber and the Amberines" – 4:11
5. "Memories of You" (Andy Razaf, Eubie Blake) – 2:58
6. "'Round Midnight" (Thelonious Monk, Bernie Hanighen) – 4:09
7. "Pigs" – 2:39
8. "Chairman Mao" – 6:15
9. "Alliance" – 4:24
10. "The United States of Amnesia" – 5:51
11. "East Timor" – 2:53
12. "Speechless" – 3:37
13. "The Age of Self" – 2:50
14. "Vandalusia" – 2:43
15. "The British Road" – 6:48
16. "Mass Medium" – 4:17
17. "Gharbzadegi" – 8:24
18. "P.L.A." – 2:05
19. "Alfie and Robert Sail Off Into the Sunset" – 1:40 (Easter egg track based on the Specials' "You're Wondering Now")

Tracks 1–4 were originally released as Work in Progress.

Tracks 9–18 comprise the whole album Old Rottenhat in the original order, all selections from which were written by Wyatt.
