= Comicopera =

Studio album by Robert Wyatt
- Released: 8 October 2007
- Genre: Progressive rock; experimental rock; jazz rock; Canterbury scene; worldbeat
- Length: 1:00:15
- Label: Domino Recording Company
- Producer: Robert Wyatt

Robert Wyatt chronology
Theatre Royal Drury Lane 8th September 1974 (2005)	Comicopera (2007)	Hot Chip with Robert Wyatt and Geese (2008)

Professional ratings
Aggregate scores
Source	Rating
Metacritic	86/100
Review scores
Source	Rating
AllMusic	4/5 stars
The A.V. Club	B+
The Boston Phoenix	3.5/4 stars
Los Angeles Times	3.5/4 stars
Mojo	4/5 stars
MusicOMH	4/5 stars
NME	8/10
The Observer	4/5 stars
Pitchfork	7.5/10
Q	4/5 stars

Comicopera is the ninth and final studio album by Robert Wyatt, released on 8 October 2007 and available on both CD and double vinyl formats. The vinyl's fourth side contains no music and has a poem etched into its surface. It is Wyatt's first release on the Domino Records label. It features many other musicians, including Brian Eno, Paul Weller, Gilad Atzmon and Phil Manzanera, and was recorded in Wyatt's house and Manzanera's recording studio. The song "Del Mondo" is a cover from Ko de mondo, the second album of Italian post-punk band Consorzio Suonatori Indipendenti.

The Wire named Comicopera the record of the year in its annual critics' poll.

== Track listing ==
Act One: Lost in Noise

1. "Stay Tuned" (Anja Garbarek) – 3:49
2. "Just as You Are" (Alfreda Benge, Wyatt) – 4:21
3. "You You" (Alfreda Benge, Wyatt) – 4:22
4. "A.W.O.L." (Alfreda Benge, Wyatt) – 2:56
5. "Anachronist" (Wyatt) – 3:28

Act Two: The Here and the Now

1. "A Beautiful Peace" (Wyatt, Brian Eno) – 2:27
2. "Be Serious" (Wyatt) – 2:56
3. "On the Town Square" (Wyatt) – 5:26
4. "Mob Rule" (Wyatt) – 2:16
5. "A Beautiful War" (Wyatt, Brian Eno) – 2:40
6. "Out of the Blue" (Alfreda Benge, Wyatt) – 3:41

Act Three: Away With the Fairies

1. "Del Mondo" (Giovanni Lindo Ferretti, Massimo Zamboni, Gianni Maroccolo, Francesco Magnelli, Giorgio Canali) – 3:29
2. "Cancion de Julieta" (Federico García Lorca, Wyatt) – 7:32
3. "Pastafari" (Orphy Robinson) – 4:37
4. "Fragment" (Alfreda Benge, Wyatt) – 1:38
5. "Hasta Siempre Comandante" (Carlos Puebla) – 4:37

== Personnel ==
- Robert Wyatt – voice, piano, percussion, keyboards, trumpet, cornet, pocket trumpet, guitar, old metronome, karenotron (voice of Karen Mantler), enotron (voice of Brian Eno), monicatron (voice of Monica Vasconcelos)
- Brian Eno – keyboards, effects
- Seaming To – voice, clarinet
- Annie Whitehead – trombone, baritone horn
- Yaron Stavi – bass violin
- Monica Vasconcelos – voice
- Paul Weller – guitar
- Gilad Atzmon – saxophones, tenor saxophone, clarinet
- Jamie Johnson – bass guitar
- Dave Sinclair – piano
- Phil Manzanera – guitar
- Del Bartle – guitar
- Orphy Robinson – steelpan, vibraphone
- Chucho Merchan – bass violin
- Maurizio Camardi – saxophones
- Alfonso Santimone – piano, keyboards
- Alessandro Fedrigo – bass guitar
- Paolo Vidaich – percussion
- Gianni Bertoncini – drums
