= The End of an Ear =

- Original album cover design

Studio album by Robert Wyatt
- Released: 4 December 1970
- Recorded: August 1970
- Studio: Sound Techniques, Chelsea, London
- Genre: Free jazz
- Length: 47:02
- Label: CBS Records International, Esoteric Recordings
- Producer: Robert Wyatt

Robert Wyatt chronology
The End of an Ear (1970)	Rock Bottom (1974)

Professional ratings
Review scores
Source	Rating
AllMusic	4/5 stars

The End of an Ear is the debut solo album by Soft Machine's Robert Wyatt.

== Background ==
The album was recorded in August 1970, while Wyatt took a break from Soft Machine, the band he would leave the following year. Containing mostly free jazz and experimental music, the music has no lyrics, only vocal experimentation by Wyatt. It includes Soft Machine's Elton Dean on saxophone and Caravan's Dave Sinclair (who, in 1971, would join Wyatt in the group Matching Mole) on organ. About half of the album is filled by a two-part cover of Gil Evans' "Las Vegas Tango". The track "To Carla, Marsha and Caroline (For Making Everything Beautifuller)" is based on the music of "Instant Pussy", a song Wyatt first recorded solo during a Soft Machine BBC session in late 1969 and which appeared, also in instrumental form, on Matching Mole's first album.

== Re-issue ==
The album was re-issued, in remastered form, with a booklet and fully restored artwork and essay, by Esoteric Recordings in July 2012.

In July 2012, Paul Sexton of Prog magazine commented: "It begins with deranged, high-speed voices like something out of The Goon Show, in a vaguely Latin mood and set to discordant piano. It ends 47 minutes later having made barely a concession to the protocols of melody, lyrics or song construction. The debut solo album by Robert Wyatt was a law unto itself in 1970 and is just as enigmatic today." While Marcus O'Dair of Jazzwise magazine said, "At moments it sounds like free jazz, at others modernist sound collage, at one point, Hendrix's "Purple Haze"."

== Track listing ==
All tracks composed by Robert Wyatt, except where indicated

Side A

1. "Las Vegas Tango Part 1 (Repeat)" (Gil Evans) (8:13)
2. "To Mark Everywhere" (Note: On the 1970 Rock Buster sampler album, this track is credited to Carla Bley) (2:26)
3. "To Saintly Bridget" (2:22)
4. "To Oz Alien Daevyd and Gilly" (2:09)
5. "To Nick Everyone" (9:15)

Side B

1. "To Caravan and Brother Jim" (5:22)
2. "To the Old World (Thank You For the Use of Your Body, Goodbye)" (3:18)
3. "To Carla, Marsha and Caroline (For Making Everything Beautifuller)" (2:47)
4. "Las Vegas Tango Part 1" (Gil Evans) (11:07)

The song titles refer to the following people or groups: Mark Ellidge (Wyatt's half brother), Bridget St John, Daevid Allen and Gilli Smyth, Nick Evans, Caravan and Jimmy Hastings, Kevin Ayers' The Whole World, Carla Bley, Marsha Hunt and Caroline Coon.

== Personnel ==
- Robert Wyatt – drums, piano, organ, keyboards, harmonica
- Neville Whitehead – bass
- Mark Charig – cornet
- Elton Dean – alto saxophone, saxello
- Mark Ellidge – piano
- Cyrille Ayers – assorted percussion
- Dave Sinclair – organ

Technical

- Vic Gamm – engineer
- Alfreda Benge – artwork
