= Shrinkwrapped =

Shrinkwrapped may refer to:

- An item covered in shrink wrap
- ""Shrinkwrapped"", a track from Shrinkwrapped (album) by English band Gang of Four
- "Shrink-Wrapped", an episode of the American TV series Law & Order: Criminal Intent

== See also ==
- Shrink wrap (disambiguation)
- Plastic wrap
- Stretch wrap
