= Ruth Is Stranger Than Richard =

Studio album by Robert Wyatt
- Released: May 1975
- Recorded: October 1974 – March 1975
- Studios: The Manor (Shipton-on-Cherwell, England)
- Genre: Progressive rock
- Length: 39:06
- Label: Virgin
- Producers: Robert Wyatt, Nick Mason ("Sonia")

Robert Wyatt chronology
Rock Bottom (1974)	Ruth Is Stranger Than Richard (1975)	The Animals Film (1982)

Ruth Is Stranger Than Richard is the third solo album by Robert Wyatt.

== Background ==
The follow-up to Rock Bottom, for which Wyatt had written all of the music and lyrics, Ruth... consisted of Wyatt's adaptations and arrangements of other people's music (either friends – Phil Manzanera, Fred Frith, Mongezi Feza, former Wilde Flowers bandmate Brian Hopper – or influences – Charlie Haden) with Wyatt adding his own lyrics in much the same way as he had done on Matching Mole's Little Red Record. Apart from "Sonia", recorded for the shelved "Yesterday Man" single in October 1974 (again with Nick Mason as producer), the entire album was recorded and mixed at Virgin's The Manor Studio with Wyatt himself handling production duties. Much of the album features Wyatt (on lead vocals and keyboards) backed by a "band" consisting of bassist Bill MacCormick, drummer Laurie Allan and saxophonists George Khan and Gary Windo, with Brian Eno adding his own idiosyncratic "anti-jazz" touch.

Two years earlier Wyatt had provided the hypnotic soundtrack to the experimental film Solar Flares by Arthur Johns. The nine-minute film, "a personal essay on colour effects", had been produced by Nick Mason and recorded at his home studio. Wyatt had been involved at an early stage and his music was central to the project. The music itself would reappear on his 1975 album "in a more 'digestible' form".

== Reception ==
Professional ratings
Review scores
Source	Rating
AllMusic	link
Pitchfork Media	7.7/10 link

Ruth Is Stranger Than Richard was released in May 1975. Unlike its predecessor Rock Bottom, it received a mixed critical and public response.

Not counting 1982's Nothing Can Stop Us (which brought together a series of previously released single A and B sides, most of which were cover versions), Ruth... would be Wyatt's last solo studio album until 1985's Old Rottenhat.

== Track listing ==
Side Ruth (Side A)
No.	Title	Writer(s)	Length
1.	"Soup Song"	Brian Hopper, Robert Wyatt	4:03
2.	"Sonia"	Mongezi Feza	4:18
3.	"Team Spirit"	Bill MacCormick, Phil Manzanera, Wyatt	8:33
4.	"Song for Che"	Charlie Haden	3:42
Total length:			20:36

Side Richard (Side B)
No.	Title	Writer(s)	Length
1.	"Muddy Mouse (a)"	Fred Frith, Wyatt	0:49
2.	"Solar Flares"	Wyatt	5:36
3.	"Muddy Mouse (b)"	Frith, Wyatt	0:50
4.	"5 Black Notes and 1 White Note"	Jacques Offenbach; arranged by Robert Wyatt	5:00
5.	"Muddy Mouse (c)" which in turn leads to "Muddy Mouth"	Frith, Wyatt	6:15
Total length:			18:30

Reissues from 1998 onward have the track order reversed, with "Side Richard" first and "Side Ruth" second.

== Personnel ==
- Robert Wyatt – vocals, piano, imitation electric piano (Ri4), organ (Ri2), drums (Ru2, Ri2)
- Brian Eno – guitar (Ri4), synthesizer (Ri4), direct inject anti-jazz ray gun (Ru3)
- Gary Windo – bass clarinet (Ri2, Ru2), tenor saxophone (Ri4, Ru1, Ru3, Ru4), alto saxophone (Ri4, Ru2, Ru4)
- Nisar Ahmad "George" Khan – tenor saxophone (Ri4, Ru4), baritone saxophone (Ru1, Ru4)
- Mongezi Feza – trumpet (Ru2)
- Fred Frith – piano (Ri1, Ri3, Ri5)
- Bill MacCormick – bass guitar (Ri2, Ri4, Ru1, Ru3, Ru4)
- John Greaves – bass guitar (Ru2)
- Laurie Allan – drums (Ri4, Ru1, Ru3, Ru4)

== Album cover ==
The artwork for the cover of the album was by Wyatt's wife Alfreda Benge.
