= Marcus O'Dair =

English writer, musician and academic

Marcus O'Dair is an English writer, musician/manager, broadcaster and lecturer. He is most notable for his work as part of the band Grasscut, described by Clash magazine as "genuinely daring electronica artists". He is also notable for his 2015 biography of musician Robert Wyatt, a book described in the London Review of Books as "fascinating".

== Career ==
O'Dair works as both a music lecturer and journalist. He is also the author of Different Every Time: the Authorised Biography of Robert Wyatt, which was published by Serpent's Tail and features a foreword by Jonathan Coe. The book was described by The Guardian as "exhaustive and affectionate", and as a "meticulous and vivid account". He co-compiled the accompanying compilation, released by Domino Records.

As a writer, he has written for publications including The Guardian and the Financial Times.

O'Dair is a regular studio guest on The Freakzone (BBC 6 Music) with Stuart Maconie, and in 2015 recorded an essay about swimming in the Lake District for BBC Radio 3.

Along with the songwriter Andrew Phillips, O'Dair is one half of Grasscut, who have previously released two albums on Ninja Tune (1 Inch: 1/2 Mile and Unearth) and a third on Lo Recordings, 2015's Everyone Was A Bird. The band have been described as building their reputation on "writing about situations and places, rather than standard pop songs", with The Quietus reviewing Everyone Was A Bird as "that rare slab of post-rock that uses the genre's textures and general ethos of exploration to create new sounds instead of rehashing old ones".

O'Dair joined Middlesex University as a lecturer in Popular Music in 2015.

In 2016 O'Dair co-authored a report on the use of blockchain technology within the music industry titled Music On The Blockchain.

In 2025, O'Dair joined Kingston University as a Director for one of the four University's newly created Knowledge and Research Institutes (KERIs) — taking charge of the Design, Arts and Creative Practice Knowledge Exchange and Research Institute. O'Dair also works as Professor of Innovation and Creativity at the university.
