= Anja Garbarek =

Norwegian singer-songwriter

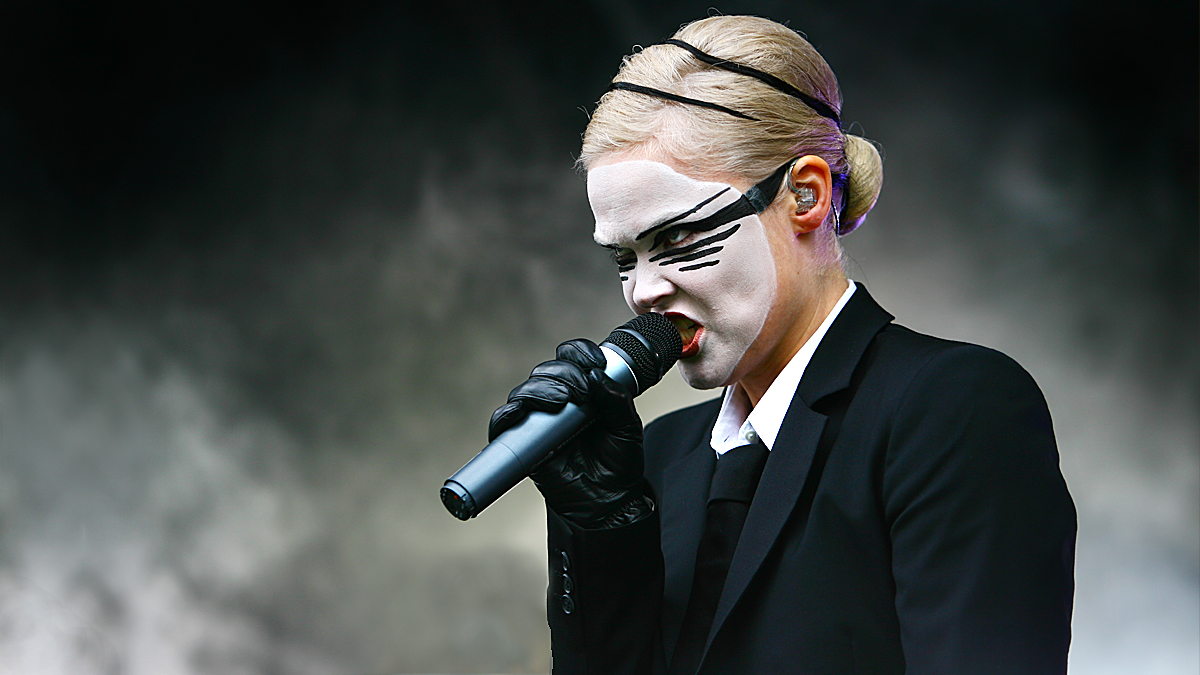
- Garbarek in 2007

Background information
- Born: Anja Garbarek; 24 July 1970 (age 55)
- Origin: Oslo, Norway
- Genres: Electronica, trip hop, experimental
- Occupation: musician
- Years active: 1992–present
- Labels: Virgin/EMI
- Website: www.anjagarbarek.com

Anja Garbarek (born 24 July 1970 in Oslo, Norway) is a Norwegian singer-songwriter. She was raised in Oslo.

== Career ==
Garbarek's debut album, Velkommen Inn (1992), is sung in Norwegian. She subsequently released three original albums containing English lyrics: Balloon Mood (1996), Smiling and Waving (co-produced by Steven Wilson; 2001), and Briefly Shaking (2006). She received the Spellemannsprisen in 2001 for her album Smiling & Waving in the open class category. She was also responsible for the soundtrack to Luc Besson's 2005 film Angel-A, which included music from her albums as well as several new songs composed specifically for the film.

Garbarek collaborated with Mark Hollis of Talk Talk on two of her tracks for the 2001 album Smiling & Waving.

== Personal life ==
Raised in Oslo, Garbarek is the daughter of the Norwegian jazz saxophonist Jan Garbarek.

Garbarek is married to John Mallison, with whom she has one daughter, Emily.

== Discography ==
=== Albums ===
- Velkommen inn (RCA, 1992)
- Balloon Mood (RCA, 1996)
- Smiling & Waving (Virgin/EMI, 2001)
- Briefly Shaking (Virgin/EMI, 2005)
- Angel-A (Original Motion Picture Soundtrack) (Virgin/EMI, 2005)
- The Road Is Just a Surface (Drabant, 2018)

=== Guest appearances ===
- Satyricon: Volcano (2002), voices on "Angstridden", "Mental Mercury" and "Black Lava"
- Rita Marcotulli: Koinè (2002), voice on "Interference"
- Wibutee: Sweet Mental (2006), voice on "The Ball"
- Robert Wyatt: Comicopera (2007), cover of "Stay Tuned" written by Garbarek
- Steve Jansen: Slope (2008), voice on "Cancelled Pieces" (and its remix on 4 Remixes from Slope)

Awards
Preceded by Nils Petter Molvær	Recipient of the Open class Spellemannprisen; 2001	Succeeded by Sidsel Endresen & Bugge Wesseltoft
