= Mark Ellidge =

British photographer

Mark Ellidge (1940 – 9 January 2010) was a British press photographer.

Ellidge worked as a photographer for The Sunday Times for nearly 40 years, starting 1 June 1971. He specialised in the performing arts, but also did portrait photography of individuals in the news.

He married three times. Ellidge was half-brother to musician Robert Wyatt and played some piano on his 1970 solo album The End of an Ear.
