= Neville Whitehead (bassist) =

New Zealand bassist and luthier

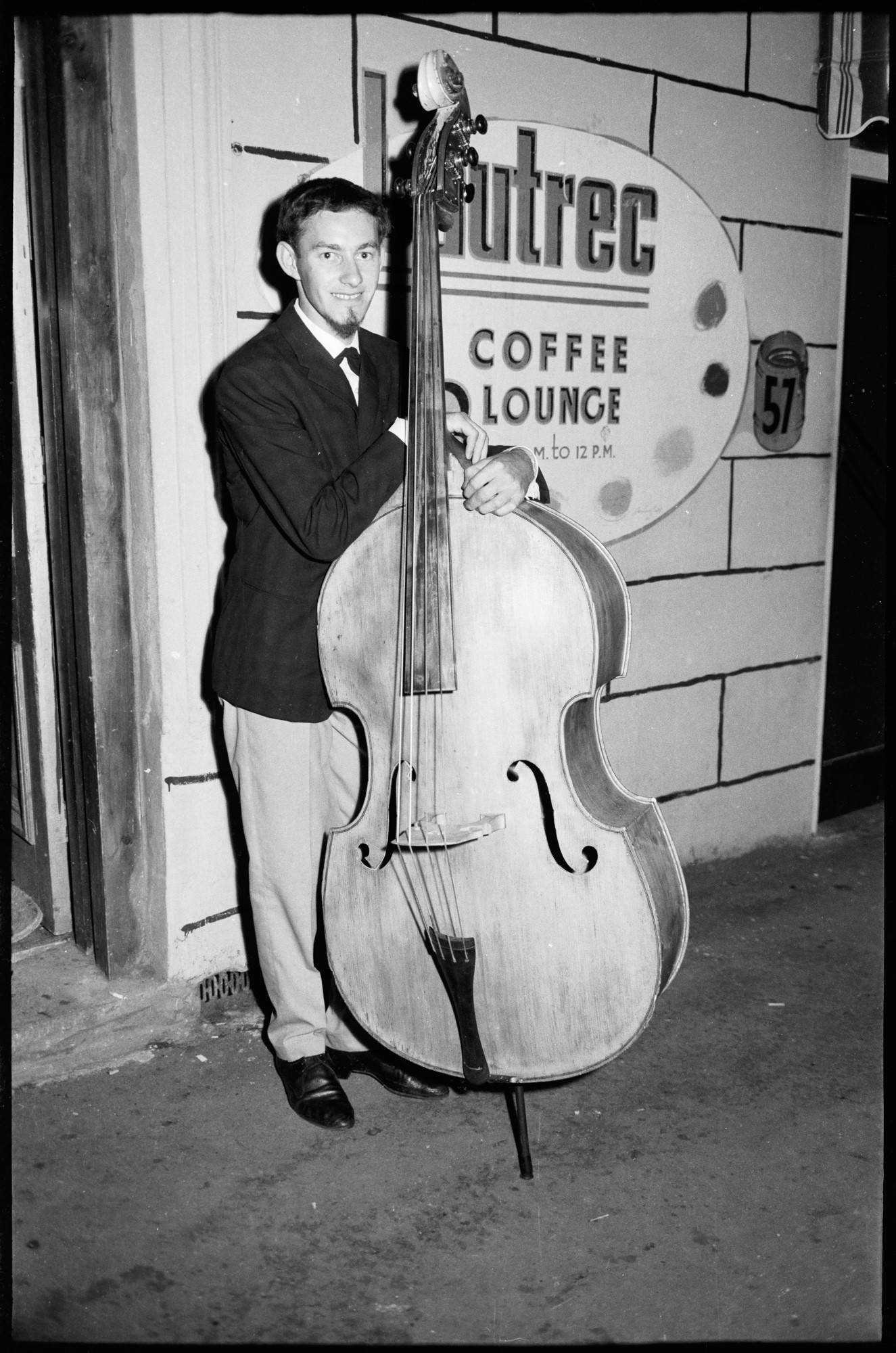
Whitehead in 1961

Neville Whitehead is a New Zealand bassist and luthier who was an active member of the British jazz fusion community in the 1970s.

Whitehead played at times in Keith Tippett's sextet in the late 1960s, including alongside Elton Dean. He appears on The Keith Tippett Group's Dedicated To You, But You Weren't Listening (1971). Whitehead played live with Elton Dean, Robert Wyatt and Marc Charig in late 1970 and again alongside Wyatt on Wyatt's own The End of an Ear (1970). Both of them played with Jean-Luc Ponty, Don "Sugarcane" Harris, Michał Urbaniak, guitarist Terje Rypdal and others at the 1971 Berlin Jazz Festival's New Violin Summit. Whitehead also appeared on Soft Machine's BBC Radio 1 Live in Concert (1971), Harris' Sugar Cane's Got the Blues (1972) and on some tracks of the Neil Ardley/Ian Carr/Don Rendell album Greek Variations (1970).

In 1967 Whitehead recorded on the Charlie Munro Quartet album "Eastern Horizons" with Charlie Munro (saxophone and cello), Mark Bowden (Drums and Percussion) and Bob McIvor (Trombone).

Whitehead recorded tracks on Bob Grimm's album "Akasha" at Morgan Studios in London in 1971, after Bob left Frankie Valli's Four Seasons.

Whitehead was part of the Elton Dean Quartet in 1971 and appears on Elton Dean (a.k.a. Just Us; 1971). Whitehead remained with the band for live shows as Just Us in 1972. He later appeared on Isotope's Deep End (1976).

In the mid-1970s Whitehead was a member of the second incarnation of Sun Treader with Morris Pert and Peter Robinson. They recorded "Chromosphere" which appeared on The Music of Morris Pert (1975).

Whitehead lived in England from 1969 to 1983 while he worked as a luthier after completing his apprenticeship as a luthier with luthier Gimpel Solomon.

Whitehead worked as a luthier at the first Isle of Man International Double Bass Competition and Workshop in 1978.

Whitehead now lives in Australia, working as bass luthier.
