= Rock Bottom (album) =

Studio album by Robert Wyatt
- Released: 26 July 1974
- Recorded: February 1974 (basic tracks); April–May 1974 (overdubs)
- Studios: Delfina's Farm, Little Bedwyn, Wiltshire (basic tracks); The Manor Studio, Oxfordshire; CBS, London (overdubs)
- Genres: Art rock; Canterbury scene; progressive rock; psychedelic rock
- Length: 39:31
- Label: Virgin
- Producer: Nick Mason

Robert Wyatt chronology
The End of an Ear (1970)	Rock Bottom (1974)	Ruth Is Stranger Than Richard (1975)

Alternative cover
- Cover of the 1998 re-issue

Rock Bottom is the second solo album by the English musician Robert Wyatt. It was released on 26 July 1974 by Virgin Records. The album was produced by Pink Floyd's drummer Nick Mason, and was recorded following a 1973 accident which left Wyatt a paraplegic. He enlisted musicians including Ivor Cutler, Hugh Hopper, Richard Sinclair, Laurie Allan, Mike Oldfield and Fred Frith in the recording.

== Background ==
Wyatt's band Matching Mole disbanded soon after the release of Matching Mole's Little Red Record in 1972, and he soon began composing the material that later appeared on Rock Bottom. The album's preparation was interrupted by an accident on the night of 1 June 1973, when, at a raucous party in Maida Vale, an inebriated Wyatt fell from a fourth-floor bathroom window and was paralysed from the waist down. He has used a wheelchair ever since. He later called the event the beginning of his maturity, and in hospital he continued to work on the songs that would appear on Rock Bottom "in a trance": "I was just relieved that I could do something from a wheelchair. If anything, being a paraplegic helped me with the music because being in hospital left me free to dream, and to really think through the music."

Within six months he was back at work in the recording studio and appeared on stage at London's Rainbow Theatre with Pink Floyd and his former band Soft Machine, who played a benefit concert for him. Although the music on Rock Bottom itself is intense and often harrowing, and the lyrics to the songs are dense and deeply personal, Wyatt has denied that the material was a direct result of the accident and the long period of recuperation; much of the album had been written while in Venice in early 1973, where his partner and future wife Alfreda Benge was working as an assistant editor on Nicolas Roeg's film Don't Look Now.

== Recording ==
Having written most of the songs while in Venice, Wyatt went to record them a few months after his accident. By the time he and Alfreda "were stuck for somewhere to stay, and one of the people who helped was Delfina Entrecanales, who had a farm in Wiltshire around a village called Little Bedwyn". Part of the album was recorded there. They brought a "recording van and parked it in a field behind and put cables through the windows, so it wasn’t really soundproofed – a few donkeys and tractors going by are on the tape". (Delfina Canales is "the" Delfina who owned the "wineglasses", "tray" and "small battery" included in the "Personnel" section below as played by Wyatt). The rest of the album was recorded at The Manor Studio at Shipton-on-Cherwell and CBS Studios in London.

== Music and lyrics ==
Wyatt recorded Rock Bottom with musicians from both the progressive rock and jazz scenes. Dissatisfied with jazz fusion as it had existed previously, which he felt typically took the "worst of both" rock and jazz with excessive "noodling," Wyatt sought to achieve a novel, "upside down" style of jazz-rock fusion on Rock Bottom. It combined the "looseness," rhythm section, improvisation and instrumentation of jazz with the song-form structure of rock or folk music. According to Chris Dahlen of Pitchfork, "It’s impossible not to hear the stretched-out time of convalescence in its drones and long melodies as Wyatt devotes himself to keyboards, whittling at his synths as quizzically as he hones his lyrics, which gnarl with surreal wordplay but temper the brilliantly grounded wit that flashed across his earlier work."

== Artwork ==
Rock Bottom has been released with two different covers, both featuring artworks by Alfreda Benge. The cover found on the original LP and several reissues is a pencil drawing of a scene at an ocean shore. The upper area of the cover, inspired by a Victorian-era book cover, depicts activity along the beach and off to the horizon, while the bottom third gives an underwater view of strange animal and plant life in the sea. Details include three teenage girls playing at the beach, a faraway steamer, seagulls and sandcastles. Benge intended the cover's subdued style to strike a contrast with the dominant trend of fantastical progressive rock album art, best typified by Roger Dean's science fiction-inspired artwork for Yes. At a time when "all the covers were getting more and more complicated, competing with each other for pizzazz", Benge said, "the only way to counter that ... was to be absolutely minimal and quiet."

== Release ==
=== Promotion ===
To promote Rock Bottom, a headlining performance by Wyatt was held on 8 September 1974 at the Theatre Royal, Drury Lane, a West End theatre in London. The concert was reportedly arranged by the Virgin Records executive Richard Branson, who told Wyatt that certain musicians had expressed interest in performing as Wyatt's backing band for a concert. Meanwhile, Branson also told the same musicians that Wyatt had expressed interest in recruiting them for his live band.

The one-off backing band assembled for the concert, dubbed Robert Wyatt & Friends, included most of the musicians featured on Rock Bottom along with several other guests. The band included Wyatt's "dream rhythm section" of Dave Stewart on keyboards, Laurie Allan on drums, and Hugh Hopper on bass guitar. Other performers from the Rock Bottom sessions included Mongezi Feza on trumpet, Mike Oldfield on guitar, Fred Frith on several stringed instruments, and Ivor Cutler on spoken word vocals. Nick Mason of Pink Floyd, the producer of Rock Bottom, made a guest appearance on drums. Julie Tippetts, who was not involved in recording Rock Bottom, sang back-up vocals on several songs and performed one of her own songs, "Mind of a Child". Most of the band had collaborated with Wyatt prior to Rock Bottom; for example, Hopper was also in Soft Machine, and Wyatt and Tippetts had both been members of Centipede.

=== Concert at Theatre Royal, Drury Lane ===
The concert served as the live premiere of the album, which had been released a little over a month prior. In addition to the songs from Rock Bottom, the set list included cover of songs by Wyatt's former bands; a performance by Julie Tippetts of her own song, "Mind of a Child"; and most notably, an extended version of "I'm a Believer", a song written by Neil Diamond for the Monkees.

John Peel, the BBC Radio 1 disc jockey, served as the evening's master of ceremonies wearing a glam rock-style costume. Opening acts Ivor Cutler and Phyllis King performed songs and spoken word poetry. Peel, who had considered Wyatt his favourite drummer prior to the accident, delivered an introduction and concluded by announcing: "And now, for Robert Wyatt of Twickenham... opportunity knocks!" Wyatt entered the stage and received a standing ovation. Positioned between a mixer and keyboards, he said that the mixer was not actually plugged in but would give him "something to do with my hands." He said he would "probably not" play the keyboards, since he had not done so in rehearsal, but remarked that they "look good" anyway. After two covers of songs composed by Hugh Hopper, the band performed the songs from Rock Bottom, starting with "Sea Song". Over the course of the concert, Wyatt's band performed Rock Bottom in its entirety, albeit not in the same order as the album. The more confident performance of Rock Bottom turned a corner from the unsteady playing in the first two songs. Wyatt, in particular, performed with noticeably greater confidence after the audience applauded in recognition at the opening lines of "Sea Song". During "Sea Song", the band launched into extended group improvisations not present on the studio version, which Simon Reynolds compared to an "Anglicised Bitches Brew," and ends the song with improvisatory scat singing, which Reynolds described as his "falsetto spiral[ling] up into ecstatic scat acrobatics, as though his spirit is trying to escape his shattered body." Will Hermes likened Wyatt's scat vocals throughout the concert to the sound of "a choirboy at an acid test.

== Reception ==
Professional ratings
Review scores
Source	Rating
AllMusic	4.5/5 stars
AllMusic Guide	5/5 stars
Christgau's Record Guide	B+
The Independent	5/5 stars
Mojo	5/5 stars
Pitchfork	9.0/10
Q	5/5 stars
The Rolling Stone Album Guide	3.5/5 stars
Spin	10/10
Uncut	5/5 stars

Rock Bottom sold better than expected, and was released to acclaim from critics. The British musical press praised the album, with positive reviews in NME, Melody Maker, Sounds, and the Record and Radio Mirror. The album charted in the United States on Billboard FM Action—a chart that measured airplay of LPs on "progressive rock" radio stations—where it peaked at number 13 in 1975.

Village Voice critic Robert Christgau wrote of Rock Bottom in a retrospective review, "I'm at a loss to describe this album of 'drones and songs' conceived and recorded after Wyatt's crippling accident except to say that the keyboards that dominate instrumentally are of a piece with his lovely tortured-to-vulnerable quaver and that the mood is that of a paraplegic with the spirit to conceive and record an album of drones and songs."

Reviewing the album for Pitchfork in 2010, Douglas Wolk said:

The six songs of Rock Bottom were a new kind of music for Wyatt: very slow, exquisitely deliberate. (It's easy to hear echoes of the album in latter-day Radiohead, among others.) The magnificent "Sea Song" is the most immediately gripping piece here, but everything has peculiar little joys that take their time emerging.

Pitchfork listed it as the 98th best album of the 1970s. In 2015, NME ranked the album at 358 on its list of the 500 "greatest albums of all time."

In 2024 David Polanski, writing on the album's 50th anniversary, said: "The accident that rendered him paraplegic, and should have sidelined him thereafter, in fact resulted in one of the greatest weird/weirdest great albums ever made ... even after half a century, while it’s surely not for everybody, Rock Bottom remains one of the most curiously affecting records of the rock era."

== Legacy ==
"Sea Song" was covered in 1985 by Tears for Fears for the B-side of the single "I Believe (A Soulful Re-Recording)", the original version of which was dedicated to Wyatt in the LP liner notes. According to the band's Roland Orzabal, "This track was the B-side to 'I Believe', which was so clearly inspired by Robert Wyatt that I thought it would be a good idea to cover one of his songs for the flip side. His voice in my opinion is one of the best, not something I felt I could match, but if I introduced one person to his music then it would have been worth it."

The North Sea Radio Orchestra, alongside John Greaves, Annie Barbazza and William D. Drake, performed the full album live in November 2018. On 17 May 2019, this recording was released on CD and vinyl as Folly Bololey: Songs From Robert Wyatt's Rock Bottom via Greaves' record label Dark Companion, including four bonus Wyatt covers. Liner notes for the album were provided by Massimo "Max" Marchini, Jonathan Coe and Wyatt himself, the latter writing that "the concert [was] a beautiful event for [him]" and that "[he felt] so honored and so grateful". The album was performed live again at Cafe Oto on 27 June 2019.

== Track listing ==
All songs written by Robert Wyatt.

Side one
No.	Title	Length
1.	"Sea Song"	6:31
2.	"A Last Straw"	5:46
3.	"Little Red Riding Hood Hit the Road"	7:40

Side two
No.	Title	Length
4.	"Alifib"	6:55
5.	"Alifie" ( (Note: Titled "Alifie" on the initial release's labels, but identified as "Alife" on the sleeve due to a misprint. Some reissues use "Alifie," others "Alife," but the song is copyrighted as "Alifie."))	6:31
6.	"Little Red Robin Hood Hit the Road"	6:08

== Personnel ==
- Robert Wyatt – vocals, keyboards, percussion, slide guitar (2), James' drum (1, 3, 5), Delfina's wineglass (2), Delfina's tray and a small battery (3)
- Mike Oldfield – electric guitar (6)
- Gary Windo – bass clarinet, tenor saxophone (5)
- Ivor Cutler – voice (3, 6), baritone concertina, harmonium (6)
- Alfreda Benge – voice (5)
- Mongezi Feza – trumpets (3)
- Fred Frith – viola (6)
- Hugh Hopper – bass guitar (2, 4, 5)
- Richard Sinclair – bass guitar (1, 3, 6)
- Laurie Allan – drums (2, 6)

=== Production ===
- Nick Mason – producer
- Steve Cox – engineer (at The Manor and on Delfina's Farm)
- Dick Palmer – engineer (at CBS London)
- Toby Bird – assistant engineer (at CBS London)
