= The Animals Film =

- 25th Anniversary Edition DVD cover
- Directed by: Victor Schonfeld & Myriam Alaux
- Written by: Victor Schonfeld
- Produced by: Victor Schonfeld & Myriam Alaux
- Narrated by: Julie Christie
- Cinematography: Kevin Keating
- Edited by: Victor Schonfeld
- Music by: Robert Wyatt
- Release date: 1981
- Running time: 136 minutes
- Country: United Kingdom
- Language: English

The Animals Film is a 1981 feature documentary film about the use of animals by human beings, directed by Victor Schonfeld and Myriam Alaux, and narrated by actress Julie Christie.

== Synopsis ==
The Animals Film presents a survey of the uses of animals in factory farming, as pets, for entertainment, in scientific and military research, hunting, etc. The film also profiles the international animal rights movement. The film incorporates secret government footage, cartoons, newsreels, and excerpts from propaganda films.

== Release ==
The Animals Film was distributed in cinemas in Britain, Australia, Germany, Austria, Canada and the United States, and was broadcast on numerous television networks. The British network, Channel 4, transmitted the film during the Channel's third night on air in November 1982. It generated front-page news in Britain at the time because Channel 4 broadcast a two-hour version of the film shorn of seven minutes of its concluding sequence. The original 136 minute film released in cinemas had been approved with a 'AA' certificate and no cuts by the BBFC, but the Independent Broadcasting Authority instructed Channel 4 that certain scenes in the film could 'incite crime or lead to civil disorder.' Jonathon Porritt and David Winner write that, with over one million viewers, the screening is regarded as "an important moment in the growth of public awareness of animal exploitation." Channel 4 screened it again during its Banned series in 1991.

=== Home media ===
In 2007 a DVD of The Animals Film was released with a new director's cut (running time 120 minutes), via Beyond the Frame. In 2008 the British Film Institute released a remastered DVD in the UK, incorporating both the original uncensored cinema version and the director's cut.

== Reception ==
Alan Brien, film critic of The Sunday Times, wrote of the film: "Possibly too hot to handle... stuffed with footage never before shown, and a wealth of newly-shot material often taken undercover, which documents... mankind's degradation, exploitation, and often pointless torture, of the creatures who share our planet. ...Proves, beyond contradiction, that this behaviour is not just random or personal but part of our organised society, with drug companies, government departments, scientists, military authorities, factory farmers, university research laboratories, for their own selfish ends, for profit in money or prestige. I do not know when I have come out of a screening so moved by the power of the cinema as a medium to transform the entire sensibility of an audience."

Actress Julie Christie wrote of the film in The Guardian: "I am often asked if I have ever been in a film that I believe changed people's lives. ...The one I am sure about is The Animals Film, which I narrated for its director, Victor Schonfeld, more than 25 years ago, and which revealed on film for the first time all the different ways in which we abuse animals. It's hard to quantify the impact the film had at the time. ..It was applauded when it was shown at the London film festival, and Channel 4 outbid the BBC to have it shown in its first week of broadcasting. Since then, it has been shown around the world, sometimes leading to changes in law. Many people who watched it became vegetarian. Many more, myself included, completely changed their consuming habits, according to whether their purchases involved animal testing or not. Because the message of the film was so powerful, there is a tendency to forget the film-making skill it involved. Victor realised that you could not present unmitigated horror for two hours, so he interspersed the remarkable exposés of factory farming and animal experimentation with cartoons and vox pops, while Robert Wyatt and David Byrne lent their wonderful music to it. Twenty-five years later, it stands up as a major documentary... Victor's film really was a breakthrough for this kind of documentary-making. Like the best documentaries - like the best films of any kind - it was illuminating."

British singer-songwriter Elvis Costello says he was moved to reject meat after seeing the film.

In 2010 the BBC World Service broadcast One Planet: Animals & Us, a radio documentary series in which Victor Schonfeld investigates why little has changed since the making of The Animals Film.

== Soundtrack ==
The Animals Film

Soundtrack album by Robert Wyatt
- Released: 1982
- Length: 28:11 (original); 19:38 (edited version)
- Label: Rough Trade

Robert Wyatt chronology
Ruth Is Stranger Than Richard (1975)	The Animals Film (1982)	Nothing Can Stop Us (1982)

Professional ratings
Review scores
Source	Rating
AllMusic	3.5/5 stars

Robert Wyatt composed an original soundtrack for the film, released in 1982 on Rough Trade Records. The film also features music from the Robert Fripp album Let the Power Fall, Talking Heads, and ex-Audience frontman Howard Werth. Critical reception of the soundtrack was mixed. Ted Mills of album database AllMusic described the soundtrack as "moody" and filled with "tasty-sounding analog synths from the late '70s", but ultimately it "disappoint[s] fans of Wyatt's vocals." It was later issued in a heavily edited form (losing almost 10 minutes, with no explanation given) as a Japanese CD, and all later CD reissues have been cloned from this master.

== See also ==
- List of vegan and plant-based media
- Earthlings, 2006
- Behind the Mask, 2006
