= Hannibal Records =

British record label

- Parent company: Rykodisc
- Founded: 1980
- Founder: Joe Boyd
- Defunct: 2006
- Status: Defunct
- Genre: Folk rock, re-issues

Hannibal Records was a British record label and one of the first to work with the World music genre.

Hannibal was started by Joe Boyd in 1980. Boyd had produced records by artists such as Nick Drake, The Incredible String Band and Fairport Convention and released recordings by these artists as well as others such as Trio Bulgarka on his new label.

Around this time folk music from around the world was being released by different labels but was so varied it did not fit into a particular genre. Boyd and a collection of other music industry leaders decided to coin the term world music in order to give this music a name for marketing purposes. Hannibal began releasing records under the world music banner.

In the early 1990s, Hannibal was purchased by independent label Rykodisc. Joe Boyd continued managing the label until the late 1990s when Rykodisc was purchased by Palm Pictures. After Boyd's departure from Hannibal the label lay dormant.

In 1998, Andy Childs took over the running of Hannibal. A new line-up of artists was introduced including Robert Wyatt, Phil Manzanera and Brian Eno, and the label began to reissue recordings from the All Saints Records label. As well as these established artists, Hannibal began to sign new artists such as folk rock band The Eighteenth Day of May.

In 2006, Rykodisc was bought by the Warner Music Group. In December that year, Warner decided to close down Hannibal.

== See also ==
- List of record labels
