= Alfreda Benge =

English lyricist and illustrator (born 1940)

Alfreda "Alfie" Benge (born 1940) is an Austrian-born lyricist and illustrator. She is married to musician Robert Wyatt, and the two have collaborated for more than fifty years. Benge has illustrated album covers for Wyatt and other musicians, including Annette Peacock, Fred Frith, and Gorky's Zygotic Mynci. She has contributed lyrics for Bertrand Burgalat, and for Brazilian singer Monica Vasconcelos, and has illustrated two children's books.

== Biography ==
Benge was born in Klagenfurt, Austria to a Polish mother, and came to the UK in 1947. Her stepfather, Ronald Benge, was a prominent librarian who established library schools in developing countries.

Benge studied painting at Camberwell Art School, graphics at the London School of Printing and film at the RCA. She then worked in film, making a film for the BBC celebrating the Royal Academy's Centenary, and served as an assistant to the editor Graeme Clifford for Nicolas Roeg's Don't Look Now (1973). Worked on Julie Christie's dialogue for Robert Altman's McCabe & Mrs. Miller, and for Alan Rudolph's Afterglow.

She has been married to musician Robert Wyatt since 1974, and has been called his most important collaborator by Wyatt's biographer, Marcus O'Dair. She acts as muse and manager, as well as lyricist and artist. Benge originally wrote poems which Wyatt set to music, and then began writing lyrics directly. She has contributed lyrics to many of his compositions, and her voice is featured on the 1974 album Rock Bottom. She has also written lyrics for French musician/producer Bertrand Burgalat, and for Brazilian singer Monica Vasconcelos. She has provided cover artwork for all of Wyatt's solo albums since Rock Bottom in 1974, as well as for albums by other musicians including Annette Peacock, the album Gravity by Fred Frith, Alice by Klimperei and Spanish Dance Troupe by Gorky's Zygotic Mynci.

Benge has also illustrated two children's books written by Scottish poet and musician Ivor Cutler.
