= Robert Wyatt =

English musician (born 1945)

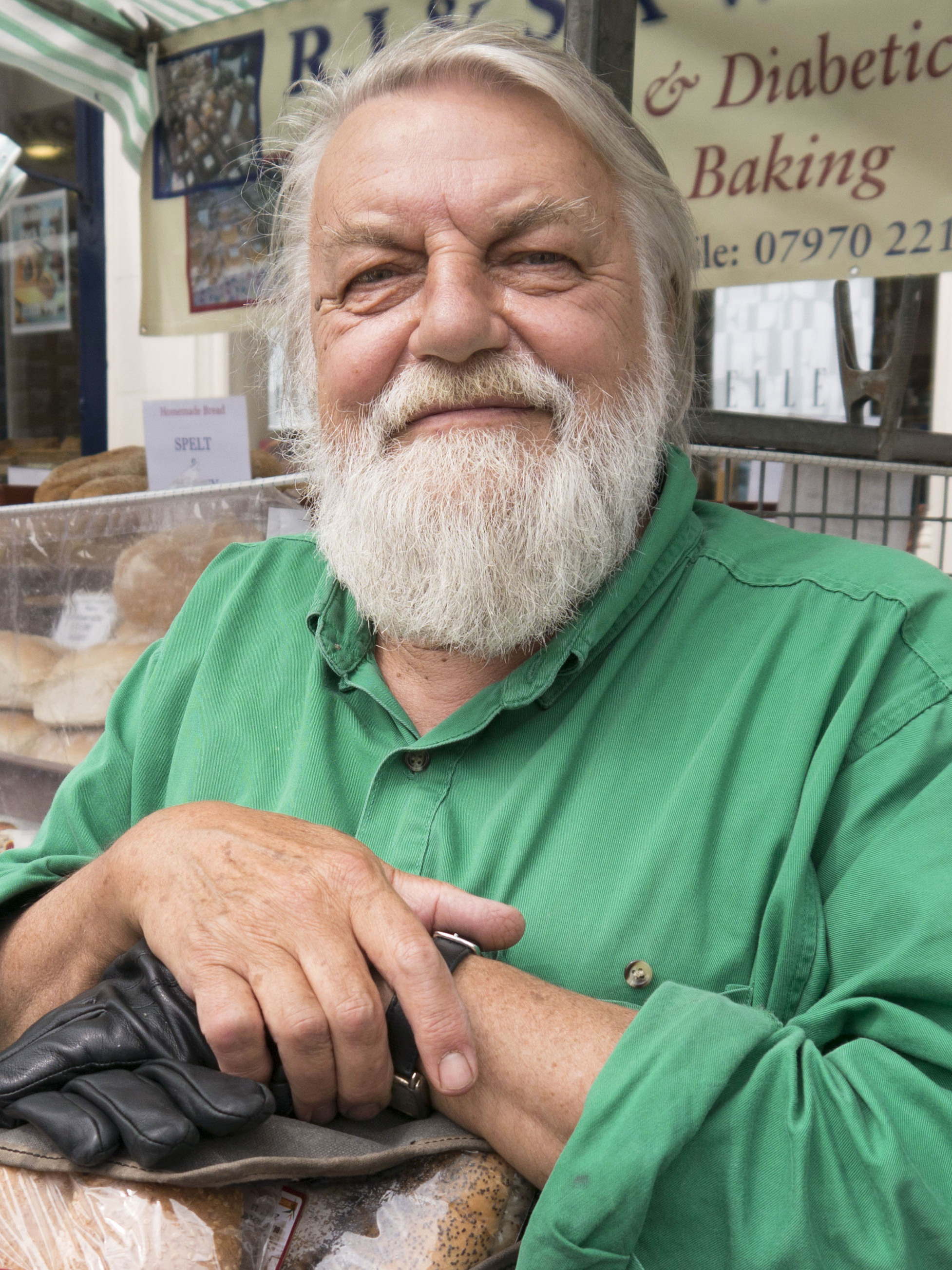
- Wyatt in 2013

Background information
- Also known as: Robert Wyatt-Ellidge
- Born: 28 January 1945 (age 81); Bristol, England
- Origin: Lydden, Kent, England
- Genres: Art rock; Canterbury scene; progressive pop
- Occupations: Musician; composer
- Instruments: Vocals; drums; percussion; piano; keyboards; guitar; bass guitar; trumpet; cornet
- Works: Discography
- Years active: 1963–2014
- Labels: Virgin; Rough Trade; Hannibal; Domino
- Formerly of: The Wilde Flowers; Soft Machine; Matching Mole

Robert Wyatt (born 28 January 1945) is an English retired musician. A founding member of the influential Canterbury scene bands Soft Machine and Matching Mole, he was initially a kit drummer and singer. In 1973, he fell from a window and became paraplegic, which led him to abandon band work, explore other instruments, and begin a 40-year solo career.

Wyatt was a key player during the formative years of British jazz fusion, psychedelia and progressive rock, but his own work became increasingly interpretative, collaborative and politicised from the mid-1970s onwards. His solo music has covered a particularly individual musical terrain ranging from covers of pop singles to shifting, amorphous song collections drawing on elements of jazz, folk and nursery rhyme.

Wyatt retired from his music career in 2014, saying "there is a pride in [stopping], I don't want [the music] to go off". He is married to the English painter and songwriter Alfreda Benge.

== Early life ==
Wyatt was born in Bristol on 28 January 1945. His mother, Honor Wyatt, was a journalist with the BBC, and his father, George Ellidge, was an industrial psychologist. Honor Wyatt was a cousin of Woodrow Wyatt, whose political stance influenced Robert in joining the Communist Party of Great Britain. Wyatt had two half-brothers from his parents' previous marriages, Honor Wyatt's son, actor Julian Glover, and George Ellidge's son, press photographer Mark Ellidge. His parents' friends were "quite bohemian", and his upbringing was "unconventional". Wyatt said "It seemed perfectly normal to me. My father didn't join us until I was six, and he died ten years later, having retired early with multiple sclerosis, so I was brought up a lot by women." Wyatt attended the Simon Langton Grammar School for Boys, Canterbury, and as a teenager lived with his parents in Lydden near Dover, where he was taught drums by visiting American jazz drummer George Neidorf. It was during this period that Wyatt met and became friends with expatriate Australian musician Daevid Allen, who rented a room in Wyatt's family home.

In 1962, Wyatt and Neidorf moved to Mallorca, living near the poet Robert Graves. The following year, Wyatt returned to England and joined the Daevid Allen Trio with Allen and Hugh Hopper. Allen subsequently left for France, and Wyatt and Hopper formed the Wilde Flowers, with Kevin Ayers, Richard Sinclair and Brian Hopper. Wyatt was initially the drummer in the Wilde Flowers, but following the departure of Ayers, he also became lead singer.

== Soft Machine and Matching Mole ==
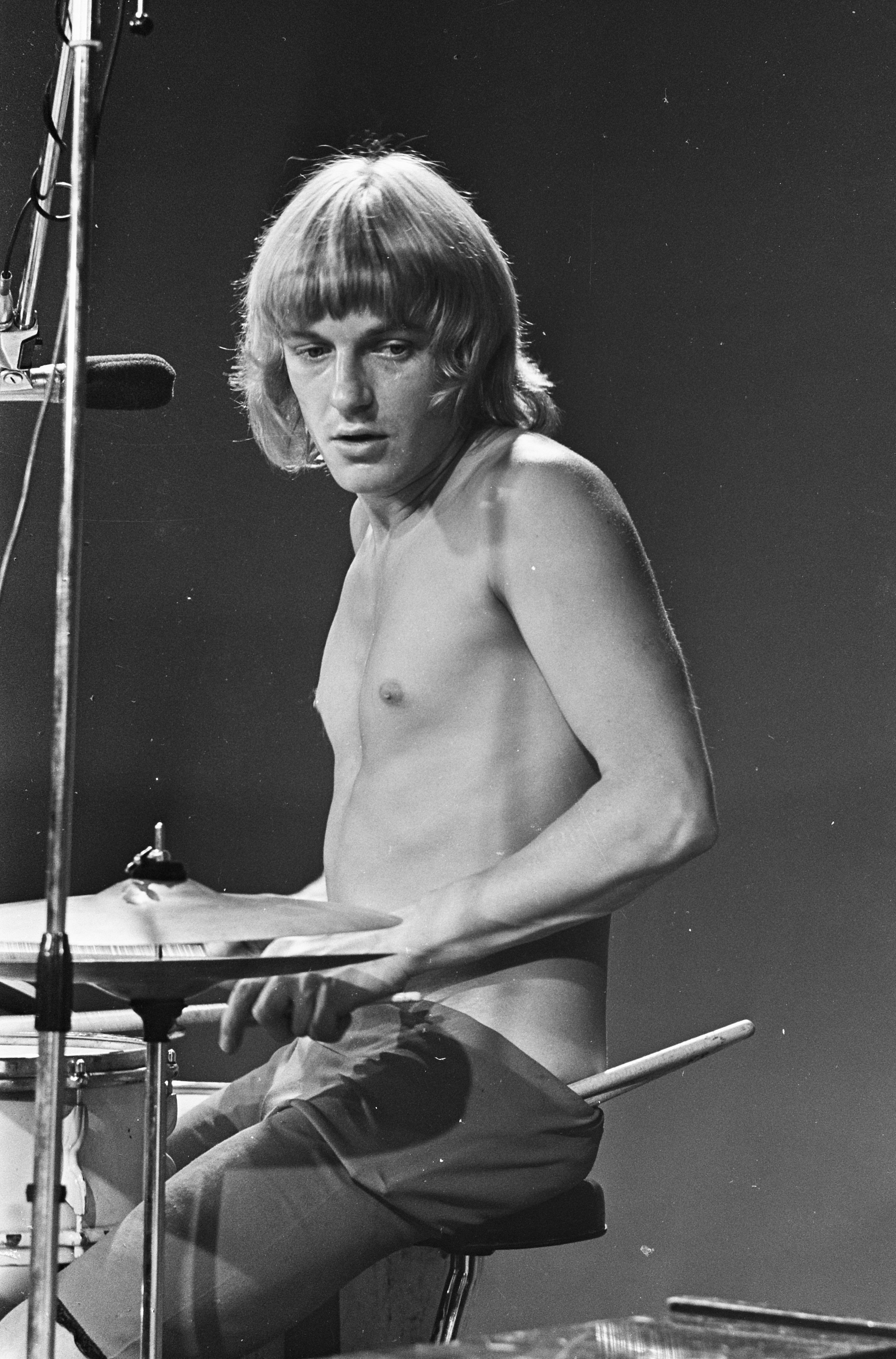
Wyatt on VPRO-TV, September 1967

In 1966, the Wilde Flowers split into two bands—Caravan and the Soft Machine—and Wyatt, along with Mike Ratledge, was invited to join Soft Machine by Kevin Ayers and Daevid Allen. Wyatt both drummed and shared vocals with Ayers, an unusual combination for a stage rock band. In 1970, after chaotic touring, three albums and increasing internal conflicts in Soft Machine, Wyatt released his first solo album, The End of an Ear, which combined his vocal and multi-instrumental talents with tape effects. A year later, after becoming increasingly unhappy about his musical ideas being rejected by the others, Wyatt left Soft Machine. He participated in the fusion bigband Centipede, performed at the JazzFest Berlin's New Violin Summit, a live concert with violinists Jean-Luc Ponty, Don "Sugarcane" Harris, Michał Urbaniak and Nipso Brantner, guitarist Terje Rypdal, keyboardist Wolfgang Dauner and bassist Neville Whitehead, and formed his own band Matching Mole (a pun, "machine molle" being French for 'Soft Machine'), a largely instrumental outfit that recorded two albums.

=== Accident ===
Matching Mole gradually disbanded, and Wyatt began writing material that would eventually appear on his second "solo" album in Venice. He began to assemble a new band to record it. On 1 June 1973, during a birthday party for Gong's Gilli Smyth and June Campbell Cramer (also known as Lady June) at the Cramer's Maida Vale home, an inebriated Wyatt fell from a fourth-floor window and broke his spine. He was paralysed from the waist down and has used a wheelchair for mobility since. On 4 November, Pink Floyd performed two benefit concerts, in one day, at London's Rainbow Theatre, supported by Soft Machine, and compered by John Peel. The concerts raised a reported £10,000 for Wyatt.

In a BBC Radio 4 profile aired in 2012, Wyatt revealed that he and his wife Alfreda Benge were also given generous help by friends of Benge's, including supermodel Jean Shrimpton, who gave them a car, and actress Julie Christie, who gave them use of a flat in London, which they later bought from her. In the same interview, Wyatt also observed that his accident probably saved his life: although he did not drink when he was younger, he quickly started to drink heavily while touring the United States in the late 1960s supporting the Jimi Hendrix Experience, and that he often caroused with heavy-drinking colleagues such as Mitch Mitchell, Noel Redding and especially Keith Moon (who introduced him to the practice of alternating shots of tequila and Southern Comfort). By his own estimation, he was an alcoholic by the early 1970s, and he felt that, had the accident not intervened to change his lifestyle, his heavy drinking and reckless behaviour would have eventually killed him.

== Solo career ==
The injury led Wyatt to abandon the Matching Mole project, and his rock drumming (though he would continue to play drums and percussion in more of a "jazz" fashion, without the use of his feet). He promptly embarked on a solo career, and with musician friends (including Mike Oldfield, Ivor Cutler and Henry Cow guitarist Fred Frith) released his solo album Rock Bottom on 26 July 1974. The album had been largely composed prior to Wyatt's accident, but during Wyatt's convalescence, he rethought the arrangements to adjust to his new circumstances, and many of the lyrics were completed during this period. The album was met with mostly positive reviews.

Two months later Wyatt put out a single, a cover version of "I'm a Believer", which hit number 29 in the UK chart. Both were produced by Pink Floyd drummer Nick Mason. There were strong arguments with the producer of Top of the Pops surrounding Wyatt's performance of "I'm a Believer", on the grounds that his use of a wheelchair "was not suitable for family viewing", the producer wanting Wyatt to appear in a wicker chair. Wyatt won the day and "lost his rag but not the wheelchair". A contemporary issue of New Musical Express featured the band (a stand-in acting for Mason), all in wheelchairs, on its cover. Wyatt subsequently sang lead vocals on Mason's first solo album Fictitious Sports (1981), a suite of songs composed by American jazz musician Carla Bley.

His follow-up single, a reggae ballad remake of Chris Andrews's hit "Yesterday Man", again produced by Mason, was eventually given a low-key release, "the boss at Virgin claiming that single was 'lugubrious', the delay and lack of promotion denting Wyatt's chances of a follow-up hit."

Wyatt's next solo album, Ruth Is Stranger Than Richard (1975), produced by Wyatt apart from one track produced by Mason, was more jazz-led, with free jazz influences. Guest musicians included Brian Eno on guitar, synthesizer and "direct inject anti-jazz ray gun". Wyatt went on to appear on the fifth release of Eno's Obscure Records label, Jan Steele/John Cage: Voices and Instruments (1976), singing two Cage songs.

Throughout the rest of the 1970s Wyatt guested with various acts, including Henry Cow (documented on their Concerts album), Hatfield and the North, Carla Bley, Eno, Michael Mantler, and Roxy Music guitarist Phil Manzanera, contributing lead vocals to lead track "Frontera", from Manzanera's 1975 solo debut Diamond Head. In 1976 he was featured vocalist on Mantler's settings of the poems of Edward Gorey, appearing alongside Terje Rypdal (guitar) Carla Bley (piano, clavinet, synthesizer), Steve Swallow (bass) and Jack DeJohnette (drums) on the album The Hapless Child and Other Stories.

His solo work during the early 1980s was increasingly politicised, and Wyatt became a member of the Communist Party of Great Britain. In 1983, his original version of Elvis Costello and Clive Langer's Falklands War-inspired song "Shipbuilding", which followed a series of political cover-versions (collected as Nothing Can Stop Us), reached number 35 in the UK singles chart, having reached number 2 in John Peel's Festive Fifty for 1982-released tracks. In 1984 Wyatt provided guest vocals, along with Tracey Thorn and Claudia Figueroa, on "Venceremos (We Will Win)", a song expressing political solidarity with Chilean people suffering under Pinochet's military dictatorship, released as a single by UK soul-jazz dance band Working Week, also included on their debut album released the following year.

In 1985 Wyatt released Old Rottenhat, his first album of original songs since Ruth Is Stranger Than Richard. The album featured strongly political songs with relatively sparse arrangements played largely by Wyatt alone.

In the late 1980s, after collaborations with other acts such as News from Babel, Scritti Politti, and Japanese recording artist Ryuichi Sakamoto on his 1989 cover of the Rolling Stones' "We Love You" which had additional backing vocals from Brian Wilson, he and his wife Alfreda Benge spent a sabbatical in Spain, before returning in 1991 with a comeback album Dondestan. His 1997 album Shleep was also praised.

Wyatt provided guest vocals on the Ultramarine album United Kingdoms, released in 1993.

In 1999 he collaborated with the Italian singer Cristina Donà on her second album Nido. In the summer of 2000 her first EP Goccia was released and Wyatt made an appearance in the video of the title track.

Wyatt contributed "Masters of the Field", as well as "The Highest Gander", "La Forêt Rouge" and "Hors Champ" to the soundtrack of the 2001 film Winged Migration. He can be seen in the DVD's Special Features section, and is praised by the film's composer Bruno Coulais as being a big influence in his younger days.

In June 2001, Wyatt was curator of the Meltdown festival, and sang "Comfortably Numb" with David Gilmour at the festival. It was recorded on Gilmour's DVD David Gilmour in Concert.

In January 2003, BBC Four broadcast Free Will and Testament, a programme featuring performance footage of Wyatt with musicians Ian Maidman, Liam Genockey, Annie Whitehead and Janette Mason, and interviews with John Peel, Brian Eno, Annie Whitehead, Alfie and Wyatt himself. Later in 2003, the Mercury Music Prize nominated album Cuckooland was released.

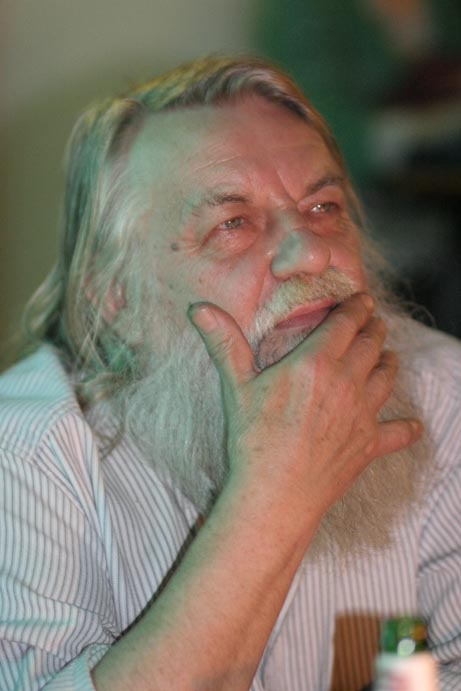
Wyatt in London, April 2006

In 2004 Wyatt collaborated with Björk on the song "Submarine" which was released on her fifth album Medúlla. He sang and played cornet and percussion with David Gilmour on Gilmour's album On an Island, and read passages from the novels of Haruki Murakami for Max Richter's album Songs from Before. In 2006 Wyatt collaborated with Steve Nieve and Muriel Teodori on the opera Welcome to the Voice interpreting the character 'the Friend', both singing and playing pocket trumpet.

Wyatt released Comicopera in October 2007 on Domino Records, who went on to re-release Drury Lane, Rock Bottom, Ruth Is Stranger Than Richard, Nothing Can Stop Us, Old Rottenhat, Dondestan, Shleep, EPs and Cuckooland on CD and vinyl the following year. In 2009 he appeared on the album Around Robert Wyatt by the French Orchestre National de Jazz.

In 2008, Wyatt collaborated with Hot Chip on the EP Hot Chip with Robert Wyatt and Geese.

Wyatt was one of the guest editors of BBC Radio 4's Today programme, working on the 1 January 2010 programme. Among other things he advocated greater prominence for amateur choirs, and admitted to a preference for them over professional choirs "because there's a greater sense of commitment and meaning in their singing."

October 2014 saw the release of Different Every Time: The Authorised Biography of Robert Wyatt by Marcus O'Dair. In promotion of the book Wyatt appeared at the Wire's "Off the Page" festival in Bristol on 26 September, and at the Queen Elizabeth Hall on 23 November. A companion compilation album, Different Every Time – Ex Machina / Benign Dictatorships was released on 18 November 2014.

Wyatt performed the soundtrack to Jimmy McGovern's 2014 BBC production, Common.

In an interview with Uncut magazine in December 2014, Wyatt announced that he had "stopped" making music. He cited age and greater interest in politics as his reasons.

In January 2015 Wyatt's biography Different Every Time was featured as BBC Radio 4's Book of the Week, abridged by Katrin Williams and read by Julian Rhind-Tutt.

On 16 December 2016 Wyatt appeared at the Brighton Dome, with Paul Weller and Danny Thompson, in support of Labour Party leader Jeremy Corbyn, as the opening instalment of "People Powered: Concerts for Corbyn". It was Wyatt's most recent public appearance.

== Influence on other artists ==
The Tears for Fears song "I Believe" from their 1985 album Songs from the Big Chair was originally written by bandmember Roland Orzabal for Wyatt, and is dedicated to him. As a further tribute to Wyatt, on the B-side of the single, Orzabal performs a cover version of "Sea Song", from the Rock Bottom album. This recording later appeared on the compilation album Saturnine Martial & Lunatic and the remastered versions of Songs from the Big Chair.

"Sea Song" was also covered by Rachel Unthank and the Winterset on their 2007 album The Bairns, and The Guardian's David Peschek said of the cover: "That's the best version of that I've ever heard". In November 2011, The Unthanks released a live album, The Songs of Robert Wyatt and Antony & the Johnsons, and Wyatt is quoted on the cover of the album as saying "I love the idea. It makes me happy just thinking about it."

Dev Hynes credited Wyatt's album, Old Rottenhat as an influence on the song, "Take Your Time" from Hynes' 2018 album (as Blood Orange), Negro Swan.

=== "Wyatting" ===
The verb "Wyatting" appeared in some blogs and music magazines to describe the practice of playing unusual tracks, in particular songs from Wyatt's album Dondestan, on a pub jukebox to annoy the other pub goers. Wyatt was quoted in 2006 in The Guardian as saying "I think it's really funny" and "I'm very honoured at the idea of becoming a verb." When asked if he would ever try it himself, he said: "I don't really like disconcerting people, but even when I try to be normal I disconcert anyway." However, Alfreda Benge said it made her angry "that Robert should be used as a means of clever dicks asserting their superiority in pubs ... It's so unlike Robert, because he's so appreciative of the strengths of pop music. So that, I think, is a real unfairness. The man who coined it, I should like to punch him in the nose."

== Personal life ==
Wyatt is married to English painter and songwriter Alfreda Benge.

As of 2023, Wyatt had been diagnosed with Lewy body dementia.

== Discography ==
=== Studio albums ===
- The End of an Ear (1970)
- Rock Bottom (1974)
- Ruth Is Stranger Than Richard (1975)
- Old Rottenhat (1985)
- Dondestan (1991)
- Shleep (1997)
- Cuckooland (2003)
- Comicopera (2007)

== Bibliography ==
Text by Robert Wyatt and illustrations by Jean-Michel Marchetti:

- 1997 MW, Æncrages & Co publishing
- 1998 M2W, Æncrages & Co publishing
- 2000 MW3, Æncrages & Co publishing
- 2003 M4W, Æncrages & Co publishing
- 2008 MBW (with Alfreda Benge), Æncrages & Co publishing

== Books about Wyatt ==
- King, Michael (1994). Robert Wyatt: Wrong Movements. SAF Publishing (Canada). ISBN 978-0-946719-10-5.
- O'Dair, Marcus (2014). Different Every Time: The Authorised Biography of Robert Wyatt. Serpent's Tail (UK). ISBN 978-1-846687-59-4.
- Arena, Leonardo V. (2014). La Filosofia di Robert Wyatt (in Italian). Mimesis Publishing. ISBN 978-88-5752-410-8.

== Filmography ==
- 1998: Robert Wyatt: Little Red Robin Hood (DVD) – documentary on Wyatt by Francesco Di Loreto and Carlo Bevilacqua
- 2015: Romantic Warriors III: Canterbury Tales (DVD)
- 2024: Rock Bottom – An animated feature film based on Wyatt's life and music
