= South African jazz =

Musical style in South Africa

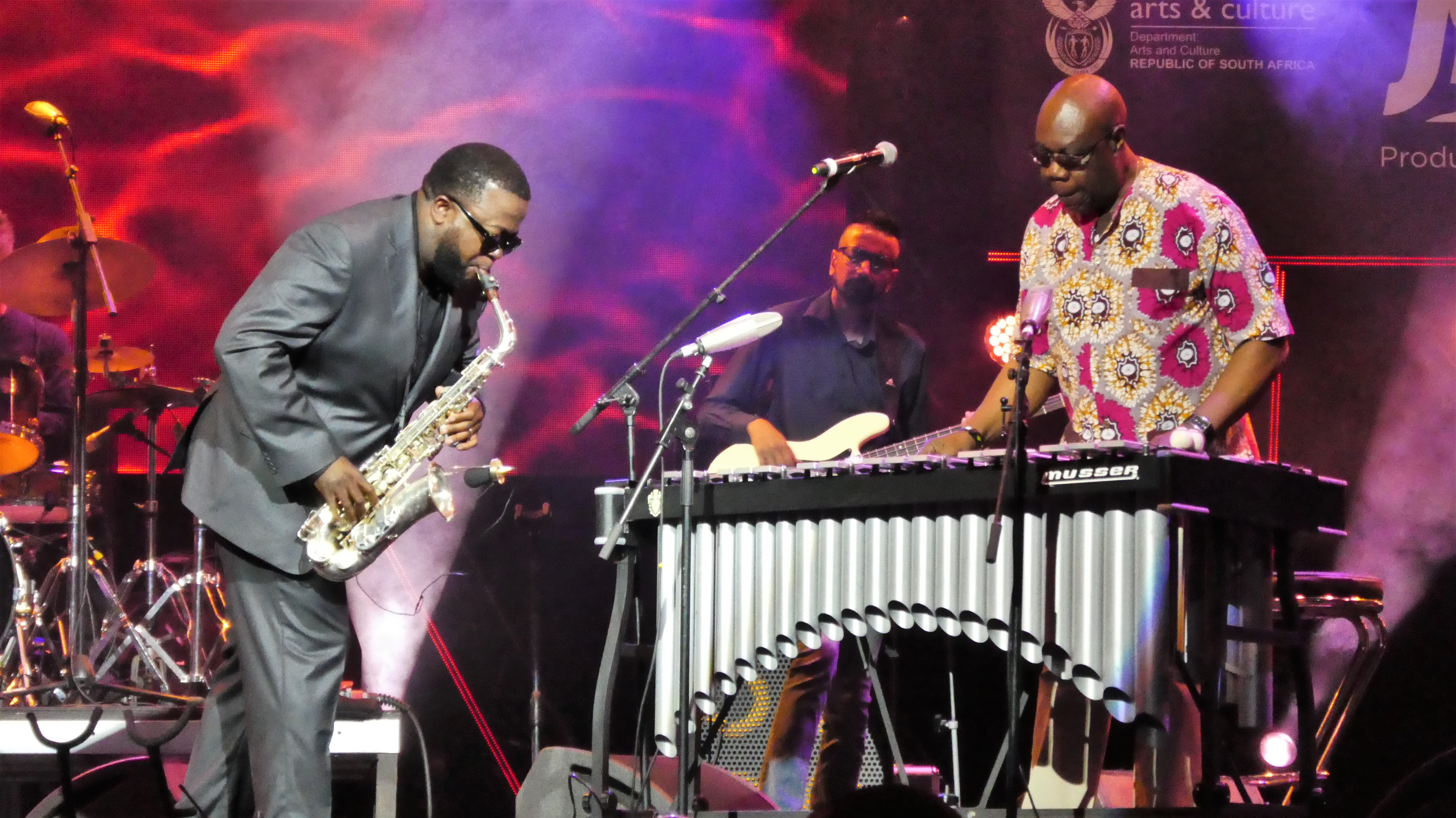

South Africa has a notable jazz scene.

== History ==
The jazz scene in South Africa grew much as it did in the United States. Through performances in nightclubs, dances, and other venues, musicians had the opportunity to play music often. Musicians such as singer Sathima Bea Benjamin learned by going to nightclubs and jam sessions and waiting for opportunities to offer their talents. One unique aspect of the South African jazz scene was the appearance of individuals imitating popular artists as closely as possible because the real musician wasn't there to perform in the area. For instance, one could find a "Cape Town Dizzy Gillespie" who would imitate not only the music, but the look and style of Dizzy. This practice created a strong environment to nurture some artists who would eventually leave South Africa and become legitimate contributors to the international jazz scene.

One of the first major bebop groups in South Africa in the 1950s was the Jazz Epistles. This group consisted of trombonist Jonas Gwangwa, trumpeter Hugh Masekela, saxophonist Kippie Moeketsi, and pianist Abdullah Ibrahim (then known as Dollar Brand). This group brought the sounds of United States bebop, created by artists such as Dizzy Gillespie, Charlie Parker, and Thelonious Monk, to Cape Town with Moeketsi modeling his sound and style on Parker's. This group was the first in South Africa to cut a record in the bebop style, but their contemporaries, the Blue Notes, led by pianist Chris McGregor, were no less involved in the local jazz scene. Together, these two groups formed the backbone of South African bebop.

An early use of jazz as an anti-apartheid tool was the production of a musical entitled King Kong. Written as a social commentary on young black South Africans, much of the music was arranged and performed by famous South African jazz musicians, including all the members of the Jazz Epistles, minus bandleader Abdullah Ibrahim. The musical was premiered to an integrated audience at the University of Witwatersrand despite efforts of the government to prevent its opening. The university had legal jurisdiction over its property and was able to allow the gathering of an integrated audience. From this point on, as the play toured South Africa, it carried this undertone of defiance with it. The success of the play eventually took it to premiere in London, and while failing financially outside of South Africa, allowed many local jazz musicians an opportunity to obtain passports and leave the country.

In March 1960, the first in a series of small uprisings occurred, in an event that is now known as the Sharpeville Massacre. Censorship was dramatically increased by the apartheid government, which led to the shutting down of all venues and events that catered to or employed both black and white individuals. Gatherings of more than ten people were also declared illegal. As a result, a mass exodus was created of jazz musicians leaving South Africa seeking work. Among these were pianist Abdullah Ibrahim, his wife and jazz vocalist Sathima Bea Benjamin, trumpeter Hugh Masekela, and vocalist Miriam Makeba.

For some, the move proved to be fortuitous. Ibrahim and Benjamin found themselves in the company of US jazz great Duke Ellington in a night club in Paris in early 1963. The meet resulted in a recording of Ibrahim's trio, Duke Ellington presents the Dollar Brand Trio, and a recording of Benjamin, accompanied by Ellington, Billy Strayhorn, Ibrahim, and Svend Asmussen, called A Morning in Paris. Artists such as Masekela traveled to the United States and were exposed first hand to the American jazz scene.

One of the most important subgenres of jazz in the region is Cape Jazz. The music originates from Cape Town and surrounding towns and is inspired by the carnival music of the area, sometimes referred to as Goema.

== Genres ==
- Cape Jazz
- Marabi
- Kwela

== Notable South African jazz musicians ==
=== Individuals ===
The following is a list of South African jazz musicians.

- Abdullah Ibrahim – pianist and composer; formerly known as Dollar Brand
- Allen Kwela – guitarist
- Andile Yenana – pianist
- Barney Rachabane – tenor saxophonist; deceased
- Basil "Manenberg" Coetzee – saxophonist; deceased
- Bheki Mseleku – piano, saxophone; deceased
- Bokani Dyer – pianist
- Claude Deppa – trumpet; resident in London
- Dolly Rathebe – singer, actress: deceased
- Dorothy Masuka – singer; born in Zimbabwe, moved to South Africa aged 12
- Dudu Pukwana – composer, saxophonist, and pianist; deceased
- George Cupido – drums; resident in Melbourne, Australia
- Hilton Schilder – piano, multi instruments
- Hugh Masekela – trumpets and singing; known as the father of South African jazz; deceased
- Ike Moriz – singer, composer and lyricist
- Jabu Nkosi – pianist, organist, singer, lyricist; son of Issac ‘Zacks’ Nkosi; deceased
- Johnny Dyani – composer and double bassist; deceased
- Johnny Fourie – guitar; deceased
- Jonathan Butler – guitarist, also does rhythm and blues
- Judith Sephuma – singer, now an Afro-pop singer seldom sings jazz
- Julian Bahula – band leader; resident in London
- Kesivan Naidoo – drums
- Kippie Moeketsi – saxophone and clarinet
- Lwanda Gogwana – composer, trumpeter and musicologist
- Marcus Wyatt – composer, trumpeter and producer
- Mark Fransman aka Sonik Citizen - composer, pianist, saxophonist, flautist, vocalist, producer
- McCoy Mrubata – saxophonist and flautist
- Melanie Scholtz – singer, songwriter
- Miriam Makeba – singer songwriter, actress; deceased
- Mongezi Feza – composer, trumpet player and flautist
- Moreira Chonguica – saxophones
- Morris Goldberg, saxophones; resident in New York
- Moses Khumalo – saxophonist; deceased
- Moses Taiwa Molelekwa – pianist; deceased
- Nduduzo Makhathini – pianist
- Nikele Moyake – saxophonist
- Paul Hanmer – composer and pianist
- Robbie Jansen – alto sax, flute, vocals; deceased
- Sibusiso Mashiloane – pianist
- Sipho Gumede – bass guitarist; deceased
- Thandi Klaasen singer: deceased
- Tony Cedras – guitar, piano; resident in New York
- Tutu Puoane – vocalist; resident in Belgium
- Winston Mankunku Ngozi – saxophone; deceased
- Isaac 'Zacks' Nkosi – saxophonist, clarinettist, composer, band leader; was one of the most important figures in the development of South African Jazz; deceased
- Zim Ngqawana – composer, flautist and saxophonist; deceased

=== Groups ===
- African Jazz Pioneers
- National Youth Jazz Band
- The Blue Notes
- The Rhodes University Jazz Band
- UCT Big Band
