= For the Blue Notes =

Live album by The Louis Moholo-Moholo Unit
- Released: 2014
- Recorded: March 4, 2012
- Venue: Theatre Manzoni, Milan, Italy
- Genre: Jazz
- Label: Ogun; OGCD 042

Louis Moholo-Moholo chronology
Keep Your Heart Straight (2012)	For the Blue Notes (2014)	4 Blokes (2014)

For the Blue Notes is a live album by the Louis Moholo-Moholo Unit, led by drummer Moholo-Moholo, and featuring saxophonists Ntshuks Bonga and Jason Yarde, trumpeter Henry Lowther, trombonist Alan Tomlinson, vocalist Francine Luce, pianist Alexander Hawkins, and double bassist John Edwards. It was recorded on March 4, 2012, at Theatre Manzoni in Milan, Italy, and was released in 2014 by Ogun Records. The album pays tribute to The Blue Notes, the South African jazz ensemble of which Moholo-Moholo is the only surviving member.

== Reception ==
Professional ratings
Review scores
Source	Rating
Jazzwise	3/5 stars
The Guardian	3/5 stars
Tom Hull – on the Web	B+

In a review for The Guardian, John Fordham called the album a "fiery jazz tribute" and a "raucous, rousing set" that "fizzes with powerful themes." He commented: "Wild but still songlike collective thrashes swell out of catchy hooks...; the street-brass sound of the old Brotherhood of Breath big band is echoed in struts like 'Irmite is Right'; the sonorous chant 'Dikelelu' has a rumbling, Coltranesque undertow; and bassist John Edwards' crunching basswalk under Hawkins' zig-zagging piano solo on 'Sonke' is awesome.

Kevin Le Gendre of Jazzwise noted that many of the songs on the album "are steeped in the kind of pathos that would melt the hardest of hearts yet crucially they steer clear of any facile sentimentality." He praised the ensemble work, remarking: "this is very much a unified, cohesive group, that, much like a Mingus band or a version of the Messengers, creates a very sophisticated orchestral groove."

JazzWord's Ken Waxman wrote: "It's bassist John Edwards' solid time-keeping and pianist Alexander Hawkins' kinetic chording that drive the undertaking as much as the keening solos from saxophonist Jason Yarde and Ntshuks Bonga. Closer to the American rather than the Canadian concept here, the ancestral background of the players hardly influences the notable sounds issuing from their instruments."

Writing for The Quietus, Sean Kitching stated: "Although Moholo-Moholo has worked with a number of uniquely talented piano players... there's something really magical about the reciprocity that occurs when he plays with Alexander Hawkins. The way they lock into each other's playing, Hawkins delivering fast, almost percussive keyboard runs describing the melodic line of the tune emerging from the near chaos of group interplay, his attention perfectly attuned to Moholo-Moholo's mesmerisingly fluid drumming, is truly something special."

Writer Richard Williams included the album in his list of the top releases of 2014.

== Track listing ==
1. "Lost Opportunities" (Harry Miller) – 6:51
2. "For the Blue Notes" (Louis Moholo-Moholo) – 5:32
3. "Ismite is Might" (Chris McGregor) – 7:17
4. "Creole" (Francine Luce) – 4:52
5. "Dikeledi" (Pule Pheto) – 6:44
6. "Thank U" (Jason Yarde) – 6:27
7. "B My Dear" (Dudu Pukwana) – 8:36
8. "Sonke" (Pule Pheto) – 8:11
9. "Zanele" (Pule Pheto) – 7:34
10. "You Ain't Gonna Know Me 'cos You Think You Know Me" (Mongezi Feza) – 1:38
11. "Ithi Gui" (Johnny Dyani) – 2:21
12. "The Tag" (Jason Yarde) – 3:59

== Personnel ==
- Louis Moholo-Moholo – drums
- Ntshuks Bonga – soprano saxophone, alto saxophone
- Jason Yarde – soprano saxophone, alto saxophone
- Henry Lowther – trumpet
- Alan Tomlinson – trombone
- Francine Luce – voice
- Alexander Hawkins – piano
- John Edwards – double bass
