= Victor Ntoni =

- Born: 21 June 1947; Langa, Western Cape, South Africa
- Died: 28 January 2013 (aged 65)
- Occupations: Recording artist, jazz
- Years active: 1970–2013
- Children: 3 sons, 3 daughters
- Musical career
- Genres: Bassist, composer, Jazz, arranger
- Instruments: Vocals, guitar
- Labels: Gallo, Barclay

Victor Mhleli Ntoni (21 June 1947 – 28 January 2013) was a South African musician, Among his notable achievements, Ntoni co-founded the Afro Cool Concept band in 1989 and received a nomination for the 2004 South African Music Awards SAMA and scored as well as arranged the music in The South African Songbook -- SA Folklore Music. His best known song is the hit “Wa thula nje”. At the time of his death Ntoni had become a legend in the jazz community.

== Life and work ==
Born in Langa, Cape Town, Ntoni grew up in the townships of Cape Town and first learned to play guitar before switching to double bass. As a teenager, he played with McCoy Mrubata in his band The Uptown sextet. He was self-taught before he received a scholarship to study at the Berklee College of Music in Boston in 1976.

As musical director of the musical Meropa Ntoni went on a European tour in 1975. Through the drummer Nelson Magwaza he met Abdullah Ibrahim, on whose album Peace and other recordings he was involved with between 1971 and 1979. He formed a sextet with Kippie Moeketsi, before going to study at Berklee School of Music, and played with Dudu Pukwana in 1978 (Diamond Express) and in 1979 with Hugh Masekela, also writing compositions including "Nomalizo". Furthermore, Ntoni worked for Mike Ratau Mkhalemele, Iconoblast and Ezra Ngcukana.

In the late 1980s, Ntoni was the musical director of the Carling Circle of Jazz festival. In 1989 he founded the band Afro Cool Concept with Darius Brubeck, with whom he toured in North America, Italy and Thailand. At Nelson Mandela's release from prison, Ntoni wrote the song "The People Want Mandela". In the 1990s he was with Hilton Schilder, Vusi Khumalo and Khaya Mahalngu in the experimental band Iconoclast. He also played with Ringo Madlingosa. Ntoni's album Heritage (2004) received excellent reviews and was nominated in the category "Best Contemporary Jazz Album" for the South African Music Award (SAMA). He wrote and arranged the music in The South African Songbook -. SA Folklore Music(National Heritage Council, 2012). In 2011, he performed his popular song, Thetha (Wathula Nje?) at Black Coffee's Africa Rising concert. This recorded performance, along with the rest of the concert, was later included on the live album of the same name.

In 2014 Ntoni was awarded the Order of Ikhamanga in silver.

He died following a heart attack at the Helen Joseph Hospital in Johannesburg on 28 January 2013, survived by his wife and six children.

== See also ==
- Benjamin John Peter Tyamzashe
