= Spiritual Knowledge and Grace =

Live album by Louis Moholo-Moholo, Dudu Pukwana, Johnny Dyani, and Frank Wright
- Released: 2011
- Recorded: June 22, 1979
- Venue: Jazzclub De Markt, Eindhoven, Holland
- Genre: Free jazz
- Label: Ogun; OGCD 035
- Producer: Hazel Miller

Louis Moholo chronology
An Open Letter to My Wife Mpumi (2009)	Spiritual Knowledge and Grace (2011)	Keep Your Heart Straight (2012)

Spiritual Knowledge and Grace is a live album by drummer Louis Moholo-Moholo, saxophonist Dudu Pukwana, bassist and pianist Johnny Dyani, and saxophonist Frank Wright. It was recorded on June 22, 1979, at Jazzclub De Markt in Eindhoven, Holland, and was released in 2011 by Ogun Records.

The concert was intended to be a Blue Notes event, but leader Chris McGregor was delayed. However, Wright was in town and available, and accepted Moholo's invitation to join the group for the evening.

== Reception ==
Professional ratings
Review scores
Source	Rating
The Free Jazz Collective	3.5/5 stars
All About Jazz	4.5/5 stars
Tom Hull – on the Web	B+

A reviewer for The Free Jazz Collective wrote: "the collaboration works well, because the South-Africans knew 'how powerful a Zulu Frank was', and it works really well, free form, floating and rhythmic and hypnotic like the free jazz of those days."

Sid Smith of All About Jazz stated: "Here, two 30-plus minute improvisations chart a series of heaving peaks and troughs into which ideas, lines and playful episodes are pitched and tossed with complete abandon... Dense, ebullient and tempestuous throughout, the near-telepathic, lightning-fast exchanges between these truly remarkable musicians is a marvel."

Point of Departure's John Litweiler commented: "At the start the three old partners don't quite seem to know what to make of Wright. But the music soon comes together, as jazz improvisation uniquely unites people, and by the end it sure sounds like brotherly love."

Writing for London Jazz News, Alexander Hawkins remarked: "The... group dynamics are fascinating: the 'three and one' of the South Africans and their American guest; the 'one versus one' of two combative saxophonists each with plenty to say for themselves; the 'one and one' of the same two saxophonists, whose shared enterprise is to make music together; and the 'us and them' of a rhythm section on devastating form that day, seemingly offering infallible support at the same time as threatening to overwhelm anyone in their way."

== Track listing ==
Composed by Pukwana, Wright, Dyani, and Moholo-Moholo.

1. "Ancient Spirit" – 31:59
2. "Contemporary Fire" – 36:59

== Personnel ==
- Dudu Pukwana – alto saxophone, piano, whistle, voice
- Rev. Frank Wright – tenor saxophone, double bass, voice
- Johnny Dyani – double bass, piano, voice
- Louis Moholo-Moholo – drums, voice
