= Song for Biko =

Studio album by Johnny Dyani Quartet
- Released: 1979
- Recorded: July 18, 1978
- Studio: Copenhagen
- Genre: Free jazz
- Length: 56:38
- Label: SteepleChase; SCS 1109
- Producer: Nils Winther

Johnny Dyani chronology
| Witchdoctor's Son (1978) | Song for Biko (1979) | Echoes from Africa (1979) |

Song for Biko is an album by the Johnny Dyani Quartet, led by bassist Dyani, and featuring saxophonist Dudu Pukwana, cornetist Don Cherry, and drummer Makaya Ntshoko. It was recorded on July 18, 1978, and was released on vinyl in 1979 by SteepleChase Records. In 1994, the album was reissued on CD with an extra track. The dedication in the album title refers to anti-apartheid activist Steve Biko, who was killed by South African security officers in 1977.

== Reception ==
Professional ratings
Review scores
| Source | Rating |
|---|---|
| AllMusic | 4.5/5 stars |
| The Penguin Guide to Jazz | 3/4 stars |
| The Virgin Encyclopedia of Jazz | 3/5 stars |

In a review for AllMusic, Scott Yanow called the music "haunting, emotional, somewhat adventurous, yet also melodic," and wrote: " While 'Song for Biko' is the most memorable piece, all five of Dyani's originals... are special. The music combines together Dyani's South African folk heritage with Ornette Coleman's free bop and elements of avant-garde jazz. Highly recommended."

The authors of The Penguin Guide to Jazz Recordings noted that the album "comes from Dyani's most consistently inventive period," and commented: "the music is strongly politicized but never programmatic."

Clarinetist and writer Sandy Brown described the album as "historic," stating that "it had to be done and Johnny Dyani was the musician most able to do it." Regarding the title track, he remarked: "The length belies the brilliance of the performance. 'Song for Biko' is a great moment in jazz, and in itself records a critical moment in the development of a new South Africa. I hope that neither the music nor the moment will be lost to those who follow."

Writer John Litweiler compared the quartet to that of Ornette Coleman, and wrote: "Ntshoko brings fervor to his drumming, while the trumpet solos by... Don Cherry offer a sustained lyricism that's otherwise foreign to these South African-modeled albums."

Author Gwen Ansell noted the "intense communication" between Dyani and Cherry, and praised the "bluesy sadness, elation, and lyricism" of the track titled "Wish You Sunshine."

== Track listing ==
Composed by Johnny Dyani.

1. "Wish You Sunshine" – 5:52
2. "Song for Biko" – 4:52
3. "Confession of Moods" – 8:20
4. "Jo'burg - New York" – 16:26
5. "Lonely Flower in the Village: Flower of Peace / Duncan Village" – 21:14 (bonus track on CD reissue)

== Personnel ==
- Johnny Dyani – bass
- Dudu Pukwana – alto saxophone
- Don Cherry – cornet
- Makaya Ntshoko – drums
