= Blue Notes in Concert Volume 1 =

Live album by The Blue Notes
- Released: 1978
- Recorded: April 16, 1977
- Venue: 100 Club, London
- Genre: Free jazz
- Label: Ogun; OG 220; OGCD 027
- Producer: Ron Barron

The Blue Notes chronology
Blue Notes for Mongezi (1976)	Blue Notes in Concert Volume 1 (1978)	Blue Notes for Johnny (1987)

Blue Notes in Concert Volume 1 is a live album by The Blue Notes, featuring saxophonist Dudu Pukwana, pianist Chris McGregor, bassist Johnny Dyani, and drummer Louis Moholo. It was recorded on April 16, 1977, at the 100 Club in London, and was released on vinyl in 1978 by Ogun Records. In 2022, Ogun reissued the album in expanded form on CD with the title Blue Notes in Concert, using tracks that originally appeared on the 2008 compilation The Ogun Collection.

== Reception ==
Professional ratings
Review scores
Source	Rating
AllMusic	2.5/5 stars
Tom Hull – on the Web	B+
The Virgin Encyclopedia of Jazz	3/5 stars

In a review for AllMusic, Brian Olewnick called the album "an amiably loose set but not terribly well recorded," on which the musicians "weave their way through a nonstop set consisting of original compositions and African folk songs as performed by an avant-garde jazz ensemble."

Jazz Journal's Nic Jones wrote: "The quartet not only plays as one but also thinks as one... The group seems to start at a point some bands might spend an evening trying (and failing) to reach... it surely must have been the deepest joy to witness a club set by this group."

Chris May of All About Jazz described the album as "essential," and noted that it "blazes like a bushfire." He stated: "The music weaves traditional South African folk music and band originals into an aesthetic that is distinct from both the American and European free jazz of the time. It is funky, intense, uplifting, a rebel Afrikan yell serving notice on the apartheid regime—semi-free rather than free jazz."

Writing for Point of Departure, Bill Shoemaker called the album "a comprehensive statement of [the band's] development in the decade since they had arrived in London," and commented: "Conversant with how the Blue Notes used dramatic swells, rhythmic permutations, and moments of suspended animation, where the four musicians swirl about each other before heading off in a new direction, the audience audibly delights in the wild ride. In addition to being a showcase for their individual talents and their collective strengths, Blue Notes In Concert documents the community they created so far from home."

In an article for JazzWord, Ken Waxman remarked: "At certain junctures the back-and-forth teamwork suggests earlier simpatico pairing such as Dave Brubeck and Paul Desmond or Thelonious Monk and Charlie Rouse," but suggested that "the suspicion remains that the four are beginning to feel the pressure of trying to replicate with one horn arrangements created for two" given the death of trumpeter Mongezi Feza in late 1975.

Jason Weiss of Itineraries of a Hummingbird stated that the album "reconfirms the special sympathy they shared," and noted that "Paradoxically, as may happen in the crucible of exile, they sound more deeply South African than when they lived there: through these years, memory and imagination conspired to transpose the voicings they grew up with... into new forms ever at the edge of wildness, full of lyrical uplift and rousing rhythmic subtleties."

Commenting for London Jazz News, Jon Turney called the album an "incandescent collective display," with "the group tearing into ten named tunes." He wrote: "the habits of hard bop are mostly left behind: the last half hour sees them draw on South African music more directly with four traditional anthems arranged by the band."

== Track listings ==
=== Original LP ===
Track timings not provided

1. "Ilizwi" (Dudu Pukwana)
2. "Abelusi (African Folk Song)" (Traditional)
3. "Amadoda" (Louis Moholo)
4. "Nomsenge" (Tete Mbambisa)
5. "Magweza" (Chris McGregor)
6. "Ithi-Gqi" (Johnny Dyani)
7. "Mhegebe (African Folk Song)" (Traditional)
8. "Manje" (Chris McGregor)
9. "We Nduna (African Folk Song)" (Traditional)

=== CD reissue ===
1. "Ilizwi" (Dudu Pukwana) – 3:58
2. "Msenge Mabelelo" (Tete Mbambisa) – 8:36
3. "Nqamakwwe" (Chris McGregor) – 5:42
4. "Manje" (Chris McGregor) – 13:15
5. "Funky Boots" (Gary Windo, Nick Evans) – 0:30
6. "We Nduna" (Traditional) – 10:06
7. "Kudala (Long Ago)" (Traditional) – 9:04
8. "Funky Boots" (Gary Windo, Nick Evans) – 0:39
9. "Mama Ndoluse" (Traditional) – 2:21
10. "Abalimanga" (Traditional) – 3:27

== Personnel ==
- Dudu Pukwana – alto saxophone, soprano saxophone
- Chris McGregor – piano
- Johnny Dyani – bass
- Louis Moholo – drums, percussion
