= African Jazz Pioneers =

Group that traces jazz origins back to the 1950s

- Origin: Johannesburg, South Africa
- Genres: Jazz, world music
- Years active: 1950s–present
- Members: Timothy Ndaba; Bheki Khoza; Sphiwe Mkhize; Bheki Buthelezi; Ntemi Piliso; Shepard Motsimaie; Phillip Tau; Madoda Gxabeka; Mr Fela; Stompie Manana; Bheki Khoza; Sam Shabangu
- Past members: Bra Ntemi Piliso; Moses Mohologagae

The African Jazz Pioneers trace their origins back to the 1950s, an era when jazz thrived, and big bands dominated South Africa's music scene. The band was founded in the 1980s by Her Excellency Queeneth Ndaba, who envisioned reviving the vibrant 1950s and 1960s South African jazz scene. Her mission was to recreate the joy and energy of that period's live performances, blending the big band sound with the traditional Majuba tempos and Marabi influences.

== History ==
The African Jazz Pioneers trace their origins back to the 1950s, an era when jazz thrived, and big bands dominated South Africa's music scene. The band was founded in the 1980s by Her Excellency Queeneth Ndaba, who envisioned reviving the vibrant 1950s and 1960s South African jazz scene. Her mission was to recreate the joy and energy of that period's live performances, blending the big band sound with the traditional Majuba tempos and Marabi influences.

During the 1950s and 60s, Dorkay House served as a haven for South African music legends like Dollar Brand, Kippie Moeketsi, Miriam Makeba, Ntemi Edmund Piliso, Dudu Pukwana, Hugh Masekela, Wilson Silgee, Zacks Nkosi, and Jonas Gwangwa. These musicians led South Africa's music scene, innovatively merging American big band elements with local styles. However, the decline of big bands began in the 1960s, paralleling the demolition of Sophiatown between 1955 and 1960.

In June 1981, Bra Ntemi Piliso, a celebrated marabi saxophonist, re-united members of the Alexandra All-Stars band under the banner of the African Jazz Pioneers. Returning to Dorkay House, the group included seasoned marabi musicians and younger players drawn to the style. Their first performance as the African Jazz Pioneers was at a Roman Catholic church in Alexandra, Johannesburg. Despite the challenges posed by apartheid-era pass laws, censorship, and systemic discrimination, the band persisted and developed their unique township jazz sound.

Under Her Excellency Queeneth Ndaba's leadership, the band gained prominence, reaching greater heights through her relentless dedication. By 1986, they toured Botswana, and international acclaim followed their performance at the CASA Conference in Amsterdam in 1987. Queeneth played a significant role in navigating these early opportunities, helping the band transition to global stages.

In the 1990s, as cultural boycotts eased, the African Jazz Pioneers toured extensively, performing at festivals in France, Japan, Switzerland, England, Spain, Germany, Sweden, and the Netherlands. They shared stages with legends like Youssou N'Dour, Quincy Jones, Gilberto Gil, Nina Simone, and Chick Corea.

The band's music, deeply rooted in marabi, evolved to incorporate the instrumental depth of big swing bands like Duke Ellington and Count Basie. Bra Ntemi Piliso, who joined the band shortly after its formation, became its driving force. Though musicians came and went, Bra Ntemi ensured the continuity of the band's sound until his passing on 18 December 2000. He was honored as one of South Africa's leading saxophonists by Minister Ben Ngubane in August 2000.

Her Excellency Queeneth Ndaba's foundational vision and Bra Ntemi's leadership ensured the band's longevity. In 2001, the Ikageng Jazz Festival, dubbed "The Night of the Pioneers," was established to honor their legacy, with the band closing each edition as the top act. More recently, the African Jazz Pioneers have performed for prominent figures, including the Flemish Minister of Culture, the President of the European Parliament, and former South African President Thabo Mbeki.

== Members ==
The African Jazz Pioneers are:

- Ntemi Piliso – bandleader, guitar
- Sam Shabangu – tenor sax
- Timothy Ndaba– alto sax
- Bheki Buthelezi – alto sax
- Levy Kgasi – trumpet (Died 7 August 2016)
- Sphiwe Mkhize– trumpet (Left band)
- Phillip Tau – bass (Died)
- Madoda Gxabeka – drums
- Xolani Maseti – keyboards (Left band)
- Bheki Khoza – guitar
- Kenneth Motshabib Mosito - Keyboards
- Sipho Mtshali
- Sam Shabangu
- Jasper Cook - Trombone (left band)

== Discography ==
- 1991 – African Jazz Pioneers
- 1992 – Live at the Montreux Jazz Festival
- 1993 – Sip 'n Fly
- 1996 – Shufflin' Joe
- 1999 – Afrika Vukani
- 2004 – 76–3rd Avenue
- 2005 – Alextown with Ernest Ranglin
