= Diamond Express =

Studio album by Dudu Pukwana
- Released: 1977
- Recorded: Autumn 1975
- Studio: Island Studios, London
- Genre: Free jazz, afrobeat
- Label: Arista/Freedom; AF 1041
- Producer: Alan Bates, Michael Cuscuna

Dudu Pukwana chronology
Flute Music (1975)	Diamond Express (1977)	Yi Yole (1979)

Reissue cover

Diamond Express is an album by South African alto saxophonist and composer Dudu Pukwana. It was recorded during the fall of 1975 at Island Studios in London, and was released on vinyl in 1977 by Arista/Freedom. In 1999, it was reissued on CD by the German Jazz Colours label with the title Ubagile, and with a different track order. On four of the album's five tracks, Pukwana is joined by trumpeter Mongezi Feza, guitarist Lucky Ranko, keyboardist Frank Roberts, double bassist Ernest Mothle, and drummers James Meine and Louis Moholo. On the remaining track, he is accompanied by saxophonist Elton Dean, trumpeter Feza, trombonist Nick Evans, guitarist Ranko, pianist Keith Tippett, double bassist Victor Ntoni, and drummer Moholo.

The album is dedicated to the memory of Mongezi Feza, who died shortly after the recording session.

== Reception ==
Professional ratings
Review scores
Source	Rating
AllMusic	4/5 stars
Tom Hull – on the Web	B−
The Virgin Encyclopedia of Jazz	3/5 stars

In a review for AllMusic, Brian Olewnick wrote: "Diamond Express may be something of a mixed bag and may never quite reach the ecstatic extremes of In the Townships, but overall it's a fine date and a good chance to hear what this late, great musician was capable of." He singled out "Tete and Barbs In My Mind" for praise, stating that it "combines spirited free playing with a lovely, dirge-like theme and is representative of the sort of music played at the time when the South African expatriates and British avant-jazzers joined forces."

A writer for Billboard commented: "One side features highly rhythmic jazz stripped of all harshness that is quite catchy, and perfectly paced. Side two features several wondrously complex jazz exchanges among a well-honed septet."

== Track listing ==
Original LP release

1. "Ubaguile (See Saw)" (Dudu Pukwana) – 8:00
2. "Diamond Express" (Dudu Pukwana) – 8:22
3. "Madodana (The Young Ones)" (Dudu Pukwana) – 7:53
4. "Tete and Barbs In My Mind" (Dudu Pukwana, Tete Mbambisa) – 4:35
5. "Bird Lives" (Dudu Pukwana) – 8:55

CD reissue

1. "Diamond Express" (Dudu Pukwana) – 8:15
2. "Bird Lives" (Dudu Pukwana) – 8:57
3. "Ubagile (See Saw)" (Dudu Pukwana) – 8:03
4. "Madodana (The Young Ones)" (Dudu Pukwana) – 7:55
5. "Tete and Barbs In My Mind" (Dudu Pukwana, Tete Mbambisa) – 4:38

== Personnel ==
- Dudu Pukwana – alto saxophone
- Mongezi Feza – trumpet
- Lucky Ranko – guitar
- Frank Roberts – keyboards (LP tracks 1–3, 5)
- Ernest Mothle – double bass, electric bass (LP tracks 1–3, 5)
- James Meine – drums (LP tracks 1–3, 5)
- Louis Moholo – drums, percussion
- Elton Dean – saxello (LP track 4)
- Nick Evans – trombone (LP track 4)
- Keith Tippett – piano (LP track 4)
- Victor Ntoni – bass (LP track 4)
