= Blue Notes for Johnny =

Studio album by The Blue Notes
- Released: 1987
- Recorded: August 18, 1987
- Studios: Redan Studios, London
- Genre: Free jazz
- Labels: Ogun; OG 532; OGCD 028
- Producers: Blue Notes, John Jack (original release); Mike Gavin & Chris Quinnell (CD reissue)

The Blue Notes chronology
Blue Notes in Concert Volume 1 (1978)	Blue Notes for Johnny (1987)	Legacy: Live in South Afrika 1964 (1995)

Blue Notes for Johnny is an album by The Blue Notes, featuring saxophonist Dudu Pukwana, pianist Chris McGregor, and drummer Louis Moholo. It was recorded on August 18, 1987, at Redan Studios in London, and was released on vinyl later that year by Ogun Records. In 2022, Ogun reissued the album in expanded form on CD, using tracks that originally appeared on the 2008 compilation The Ogun Collection.

The album is dedicated to the memory of bassist and Blue Notes member Johnny Dyani, who died on October 24, 1986, roughly eight months prior to the recording session.

== Reception ==
Professional ratings
Review scores
Source	Rating
AllMusic	4.5/5 stars
The Virgin Encyclopedia of Jazz	3/5 stars

In a review for AllMusic, Brian Olewnick wrote: "The looseness of the trio's approach allows for an emotional range of 'conversation' to take place as they recall their late comrade. When they play 'Ntyilo Ntyilo,' a traditional tune often performed by Dyani, the emotion is palpable and deep, and makes this release a fine memorial to one of the under-recognized giants of the bass."

Jazz Journal's Barry Witherden commented: "Listening to this album more often than strictly necessary for reviewing purposes it seems that it has grown even more deeply emotional, powerful, moving and enthralling... it is almost as if Dyani's bass is really there: it's not that he is not missed, more that he is so strongly present in spirit."

In an article for All About Jazz, Chris May noted that, in comparison with Blue Notes for Mongezi, "the three surviving Blue Notes had had time to come to terms with their loss and their performances are not as raw," and suggested that the reissue is a hint that South Africa "is shaping up nicely to become another geo-cultural crucible for the reforging of jazz."

Bill Shoemaker of Point of Departure praised "the atmosphere of reunion and resolution" present in the music, and stated that the album "is markedly different than their memorial to Feza: With the exception of a ruminative, freely improvised duet between McGregor and Moholo, they largely revisited Dyani compositions and traditional melodies in a deliberate manner."

JazzWord's Ken Waxman called the album "a return to bravura form and commitment," and remarked: "Celebratory rather than dirge-like, the results seem to reference more than the Blue Notes' past... Added to the expected African, gospel and Bop references are those from earlier jazz.

Writing for Itineraries of a Hummingbird, Jason Weiss stated that the musicians' "presence as a trio is commanding enough that they sound like more," and commented: "the repertoire is mostly given over to Dyani's own impassioned melodies, again rendering celebration from sorrow. Such was the miracle of the Blue Notes that every occasion for making music turned into a revelation of joy."

Jon Turney of London Jazz News wrote: "Impossible not to miss [Dyani's] colossal sound and irreplaceable spirit, but the three surviving members still make a formidable ensemble... Pukwana, in particular, seems able to enrich his sound endlessly. The hour of impassioned music here has some of his best playing on record."

== Track listings ==
=== Original LP ===
1. "Funk Dem Dudu" (Johnny Dyani) / "To Erico" (Dudu Pukwana) – 9:46
2. "Eyomzi" (Johnny Dyani) – 4:37
3. "Ntyilo Ntyilo" (Traditional) – 7:32
4. "Blues for Nick" (Dudu Pukwana) – 4:41
5. "Monks & Mbizo" (Chris McGregor and Louis Moholo) – 9:15
6. "Ithi Gqi" (Johnny Dyani) – 7:31

=== CD reissue ===
1. "Funk Dem Dudu" (Johnny Dyani) – 7:42 / "To Erico" (Dudu Pukwana) – 2:18
2. "Eyomzi" (Johnny Dyani) – 4:53
3. "Ntyilo Ntyilo" (Traditional) – 7:55
4. "Blues for Nick" (Dudu Pukwana) – 4:39
5. "Monks & Mbizo" (Chris McGregor and Louis Moholo) – 9:51
6. "Ithi Ggi" (Johnny Dyani) – 7:48 / "Nkosi Sikelele L'Afrika" (Traditional) – 0:44
7. "Funk Dem Dudu" (alternate take) (Johnny Dyani) – 5:30
8. "Eyomzi" (alternate take) (Johnny Dyani) – 5:01
9. "Funk Dem Dudu" (alternate take) (Johnny Dyani) – 7:46 / "To Erico" (alternate take) (Dudu Pukwana) – 0:57

== Personnel ==
- Dudu Pukwana – alto saxophone, soprano saxophone
- Chris McGregor – piano
- Louis Moholo – drums, percussion
