= Assagai =

English Afro-rock band

Assagai was an Afro-rock band, active in the early 1970s in London, whose relatively short career produced two albums recorded in 1971. It has been described as "the second best-known African group of the late 60s/early 70s in Britain" after Osibisa.

== History ==
The original band consisted of five members, three from South Africa and two from Nigeria: drummer Louis Moholo, trumpeter/flautist Mongezi Feza, alto saxophonist Dudu Pukwana, tenor saxophonist Bizo Mngqikana, and guitarist/bassist Fred Coker – the latter, according to Rob Fitzpatrick in The Guardian, "helped guide Assagai into position as the only real West African competition to the super-star firepower of Ghana's Osibisa" before Coker left Assagai to replace Spartacus R in Osibisa. Canterbury scene keyboardist Alan Gowen and King Crimson percussionist Jamie Muir were also briefly members (1971–72).

The band recorded for the British label Vertigo Records, and are thought to be "the only African or 'Black' band ever signed" by the label.

Assagai's self-titled debut album was released in 1971; among the African musicians who played with the group on the recording was Terri Quaye. Assagai was reissued on CD by Repertoire Records in 1994. The band's second and final album, Zimbabwe (with cover artwork by Roger Dean), was released later in 1971. It was re-released as LP by Music for Pleasure label, but under a different title, AfroRock. Both Assagai albums featured songs written by members of the British group Jade Warrior and included guest appearances from them as well.

Previously, in the 1960s Pukwana, Feza and Moholo had been members of the jazz band The Blue Notes alongside Chris McGregor.

== Discography ==
=== Albums ===
- Assagai, Vertigo Records, 1971 (LP #6360 030); Repertoire Records, 1994 (CD #REP 4448-WP)
- Zimbabwe, Vertigo, 1971 (LP #6360 058); re-released as AfroRock, Music for Pleasure, 1975 (SPR 90054)
