= Before the Wind Changes =

Live album by The Blue Notes
- Released: 2012
- Recorded: July 1, 1979
- Venue: Jazzclub De Hoop, Waregem, Belgium
- Genre: Free jazz
- Length: 1:19:49
- Label: Ogun; OGCD 037

The Blue Notes chronology
The Ogun Collection (2008)	Before the Wind Changes (2012)

Before the Wind Changes is a live album by The Blue Notes, featuring alto saxophonist Dudu Pukwana, pianist Chris McGregor, double bassist Johnny Dyani, and drummer Louis Moholo-Moholo. It was recorded on July 1, 1979, at Jazzclub De Hoop in Waregem, Belgium, and was released in 2012 by Ogun Records.

== Reception ==
Professional ratings
Review scores
Source	Rating
All About Jazz	4/5 stars

In a review for The Independent, Phil Johnson noted that, although the recording "isn't of audiophile quality," the group is "on absolute top form." He wrote: "The power of the music is shocking... You'll need a rest halfway through, it's that intense."

Point of Departure's Bill Shoemaker stated that the album documents the band "at the height of their creative powers," and commented: "The Blue Notes were on a tear that night – that comes through loud and clear."

Robert Iannapollo of Cadence remarked: "Sadly, the group was now down to a quartet... but the rousing spirit of their music was still there and still glowing strong... For those who can't tolerate a rough sounding recording, stay away. But those who don't mind a little roughness around the edges... and who are familiar with the joyous sound this band could produce, Before the Wind Changes will provide a solid 80 minutes of happiness."

== Track listing ==
1. "Ithi Gui" (Johnny Dyani) – 9:55
2. "Mange" (Chris McGregor) – 6:29
3. "Lonta Uyagula (The Poor Child is Sick)" (Traditional) – 10:31
4. "Lakutshona Ilanga" (Mackay Davashe) – 17:58
5. "The Bride" (Dudu Pukwana) – 5:08
6. "Funk Dem Dudu" (Johnny Dyani) – 22:40
7. "Wish You Sunshine" (Johnny Dyani) – 6:57

== Personnel ==
- Dudu Pukwana – alto saxophone, whistle, voice
- Chris McGregor – piano, voice
- Johnny Dyani – double bass, voice
- Louis Moholo-Moholo – drums, voice
