= Angolian Cry =

Studio album by Johnny Dyani Quartet
- Released: 1985
- Recorded: July 23, 1985
- Studios: Sound Track Studios, Copenhagen
- Genre: Jazz
- Length: 49:04
- Labels: SteepleChase; SCS-1209
- Producer: Nils Winther

Johnny Dyani chronology
Afrika (1984)	Angolian Cry (1985)	Witchdoctor's Son – Together (1987)

Angolian Cry is an album by bassist Johnny Dyani. It was recorded on July 23, 1985, and was issued on LP later that year by SteepleChase Records. On the album, his final release as a leader, Dyani is joined by saxophonist and bass clarinetist John Tchicai, trumpeter Harry Beckett, and drummer Billy Hart. In 1986, the album was reissued on CD with an extra track.

== Reception ==
Professional ratings
Review scores
Source	Rating
AllMusic	4/5 stars
Los Angeles Times	3/5 stars
The Penguin Guide to Jazz	3.5/4 stars
The Virgin Encyclopedia of Jazz	4/5 stars

In a review for AllMusic, Scott Yanow wrote: "Dyani's atmospheric and colorful music was long underrated but, like that of Abdullah Ibrahim... Johnny Dyani was a major composer whose flights were tempered by a strong emphasis on fresh melodies. Stimulating music."

The authors of The Penguin Guide to Jazz Recordings stated that the album "brims with pathos and joy, and Beckett is sterling."

Don Snowden of the Los Angeles Times commented: "Dyani doesn't have the sophistication or broad palette of his countryman Abdullah Ibrahim, but he compensates in part with a stronger visceral drive. He combines with drummer Billy Hart to give the six original compositions a unusually solid rhythmic punch."

A reviewer for Option called the album "easily one of the most inspired sessions of the year," and remarked: "Dyani has an impeccable sense of composition, offering wistful melodies which draw from both African and Afro-American sources."

== Track listing ==
Composed by Johnny Dyani.

1. "Angolian Cry" – 9:50
2. "For Leo Dirch Petersen" – 5:19
3. "Does Your Father Know" – 4:33
4. "U.D.F." – 2:43
5. "Year of the Child" – 11:00
6. "Blues for Moyake" – 7:00
7. "Portrait of Mosa Gwangwa" – 8:39 (bonus track on CD reissue)

== Personnel ==
- Johnny Dyani – bass
- John Tchicai – tenor saxophone, bass clarinet
- Harry Beckett – trumpet, flugelhorn
- Billy Hart – drums
