= Our Prayer (album) =

Studio album by The Chris McGregor Trio
- Released: 2008
- Recorded: 1969
- Studio: Sound Techniques, London
- Genre: Free jazz
- Label: Fledg'ling; FLED 3070
- Producer: Joe Boyd

Chris McGregor chronology
Up to Earth (2008)	Our Prayer (2008)	Sea Breezes (2012)

Our Prayer is an album by the Chris McGregor Trio, led by pianist McGregor, and featuring bassist Barre Phillips and drummer Louis Moholo. It was recorded at Sound Techniques in London in 1969, and was released by Fledg'ling Records in 2008.

Like Up to Earth, recorded at the same session, Our Prayer was originally scheduled to be issued by Polydor Records in 1969; however, the release was cancelled at the last minute due to financial concerns.

== Reception ==
Professional ratings
Review scores
Source	Rating
AllMusic	3/5 stars
All About Jazz	4/5 stars
The Jazz Mann	4/5 stars
Tom Hull – on the Web	B+

In a review for AllMusic, François Couture stated that the album "runs the gamut of the pianist's range," and noted that "it offers a beautiful, progressive listen, and a valuable look into McGregor's musical thought, right before the formation of his Brotherhood of Breath."

Stuart Broomer of All About Jazz called the album "a welcome release, dynamic music with an identity of its own and a complement to McGregor's band efforts and solo CDs," and wrote: "Alternately dark and playful, it's a window on McGregor's most personal voice: fluent, thoughtful, and always conversational."

Writing for Itineraries of a Hummingbird, Jason Weiss commented: "Moholo's perpetually alert, nuanced, rhythmic textures help guide the others through every unexpected contour of density and delicacy along the way, reminding the attentive listener that while free playing may have been a dead end for some, it proved a fount of resourcefulness for those who have known how to drink its waters."

The Jazz Mann's Tim Owen described the album as "a beautifully balanced collection," and remarked: "It is impossible to know how much of this music is composed: strong themes emerge to punctuate the incessantly probing flow of ideas without disturbing its continuity. Each player at times comes to the fore to determine the melodic and thematic shape of the music... No one mood prevails for long, but the transitions are never incongruous; the effect is utterly absorbing."

== Track listing ==
1. "Church Mouse" (Chris McGregor) – 4:29
2. "Moonlight Aloe" (Chris McGregor) – 7:23
3. "Spike Nard" (Barre Phillips) – 7:40
4. "Our Prayer" (Chris McGregor) – 25:49

== Personnel ==
- Chris McGregor – piano
- Barre Phillips – bass
- Louis Moholo – drums
