= The Blue Notes =

South African jazz band

The Blue Notes were a South African jazz sextet, whose definitive line-up featured Chris McGregor on piano, Mongezi Feza on trumpet, Dudu Pukwana on alto saxophone, Nikele Moyake on tenor saxophone, Johnny Dyani on bass, and Louis Moholo-Moholo on drums. After moving away from their home country in 1964, they established themselves on the European jazz circuit, where they continued to play and record through the 1970s. They are now considered one of the great free jazz bands of their era, whose music was given a unique flavour by their integration of African styles such as Kwela into the progressive jazz ideas of the time.

== Early days ==
Although the band was initially based in Cape Town (five of the group's six members came from the Eastern Cape), they came to prominence at the 1963 National Jazz Festival in Johannesburg. An album recorded after the festival was released as Jazz – The African Sound, but this was not a Blue Notes record per se, it was rather an album featuring some of the Blue Notes in a big band put together by McGregor. This big band was intended to continue touring, but proved unworkable. Instead, The Blue Notes continued as a quintet, then sextet.

Remaining in Johannesburg, they established a residency at the city's Downbeat club, but returned to Cape Town to make their first studio recordings for the South African Broadcasting Corporation. These recordings were finally released in 2002 by the Proper Music label, on a CD entitled Township Bop. It showed the band to be playing in a relatively straight ahead bebop style compared with their later work, also tracing the coming together of the definitive sextet. On the earliest sessions, only three members of the definitive line up (McGregor, Pukwana and Moyake) were present. By the time of the last sessions, documented on Legacy: Live in South Afrika 1964, Feza, Dyani and Moholo were on board.

Like fellow South African jazz musicians Dollar Brand and Hugh Masekela, they understood that the only way they could play freely was by escaping the oppressive social and political climate of their home country. As a mixed-race band (McGregor the sole white member), they were especially prone to police harassment. In mid-1964, they left South Africa.

== In Europe ==
After an appearance at the 1964 Antibes Jazz Festival in France, the group decided stay in Europe. They spent some additional time in France before taking up club residencies in Zurich and Geneva, Switzerland for nearly a year. In April 1965, they played a short residency at Ronnie Scott's Club in London, and decided to stay on in Britain. Unfortunately, their arrival coincided with a downturn in the fortunes of jazz in the UK, as recording and gigging opportunities began drying up. There is also the suspicion that they were deliberately frozen out of the British scene by established local musicians, who considered them interlopers.

There soon followed a period playing in Copenhagen, Denmark which McGregor identified as a turning point in their musical approach. They returned to London and were subsequently to be found playing almost exclusively at The Old Place in Gerrard Street, the former home of Ronnie Scott's Jazz Club which had recently been transformed into a virtual laboratory for the emerging British avant garde jazz scene. Because of this, they are still considered a seminal influence on the new generation of British jazz musicians coming through in the late 1960s. Artists such as Keith Tippett, Evan Parker, John Stevens and John Surman have long hailed them as true pioneers and a massive influence. However, by late 1965 the group was also beginning to fragment. Feza returned to Copenhagen, while Dyani and Moholo-Moholo went on a South American tour with the soprano saxophonist Steve Lacy – subsequently recording the album The Forest and the Zoo for the ESP-Disk label. Meanwhile, Moyake had decided to return to South Africa permanently even before their arrival in the UK.

The first recording opportunity for the Blue Notes came about in 1968 for the Polydor label, produced by Joe Boyd. However, the resulting album, Very Urgent, was actually credited to "The Chris McGregor Group". Despite the pianist's star billing, this was very much a Blue Notes album with all the other members back in London and contributing. Compared to the 1964 South African recordings, this album demonstrated the growth of their free jazz leanings. Another recording was made for Polydor the same year, but was not released until 2008 (Up to Earth – Fledg'ling FLED 3069). Various combinations of the group recorded for the Ogun label subsequently.

Around this time, McGregor began his Brotherhood of Breath big band project. This band, which essentially grew from the addition of British musicians to the core Blue Notes line up, would come to full fruition in the early 1970s. While Brotherhood of Breath essentially succeeded The Blue Notes, the old name was used on various projects during the 1970s. In the early 1970s, Pukwana, Feza and Moholo were also members of the afro-rock band Assagai.

== After The Blue Notes ==
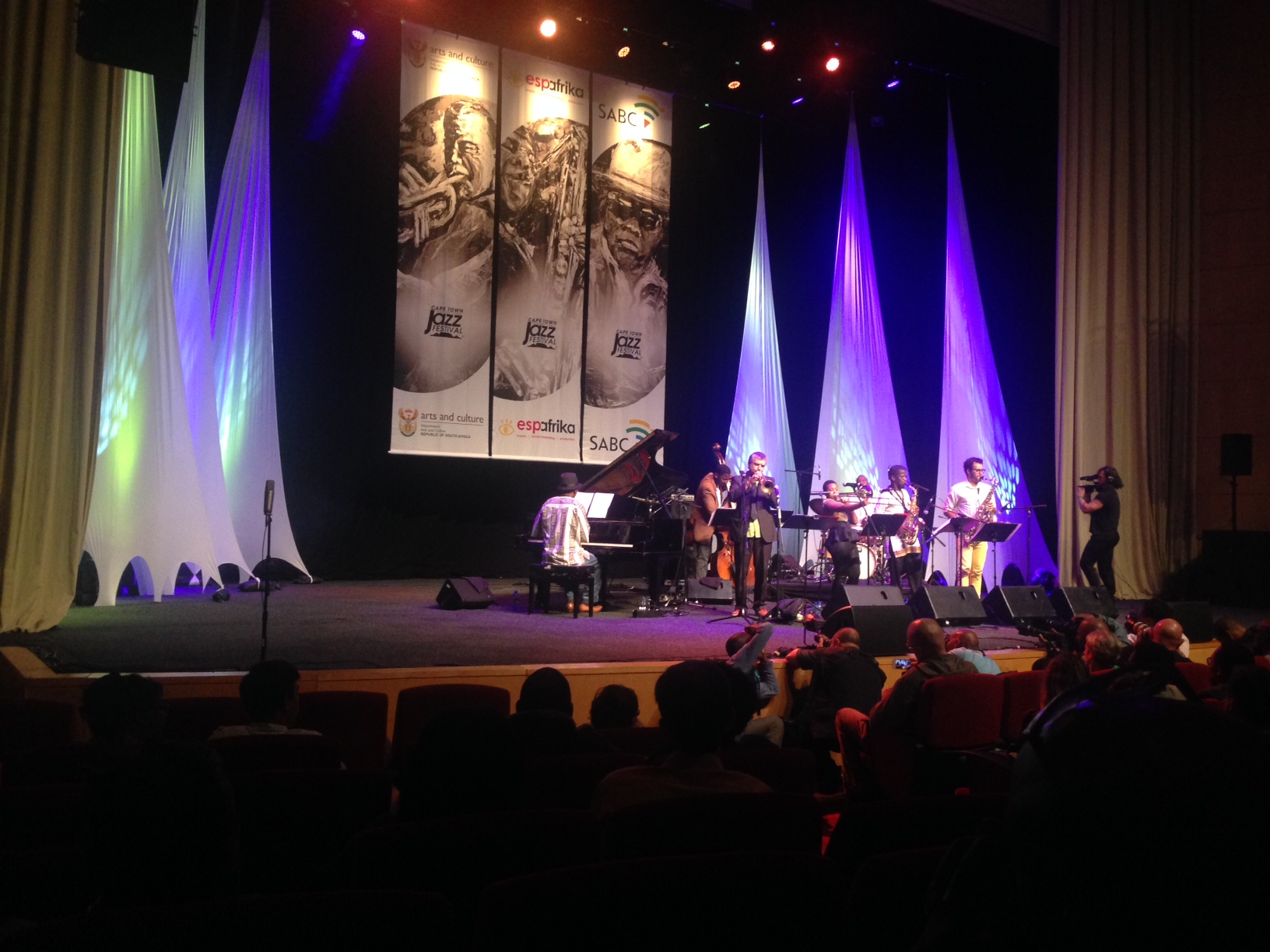
The Blue Notes Tribute Orkestra

Nikele Moyake returned to South Africa in 1965. He died of a brain tumour a year later. His place in The Blue Notes was eventually taken by another South African, Ronnie Beer, who played on the Very Urgent session.

Mongezi Feza played with Robert Wyatt, Elton Dean and Henry Cow among others, before his death in 1975 aged only 30. The other Blue Notes then regrouped to record Blue Notes for Mongezi as a tribute, on Ogun Records.

Johnny Dyani moved to Denmark in the early 1970s, where he continued to play and record extensively with a number of great musicians, including Don Cherry and Mal Waldron. Dyani died in 1986, prompting another reunion of the surviving Blue Notes to record Blue Notes for Johnny.

Chris McGregor kept his Brotherhood of Breath going in various forms until his death in 1990. He had been a resident of France since the early 1970s.

Dudu Pukwana continued to make records in Britain, both under his own leadership and with McGregor. Pukwana died in 1990, only a month after McGregor.

Of the definitive line-up, only Louis Moholo-Moholo lived long enough to return to post-apartheid South Africa. He participated in a huge number of recordings with such musicians as Cecil Taylor, Evan Parker and Stan Tracey. He formed the Dedication Orchestra, a big band of all-star improvisors dedicated to playing the music of the South African exiles. His 2014 live album For the Blue Notes pays tribute to his former bandmates.

== Legacy ==
On 21 September 2007, President Thabo Mbeki gave official recognition to the contribution of the Blue Notes to South African music by awarding the group the national Order of Ikhamanga in Silver. The citation for the award stated, in part: "Blue Notes goes back to a golden age in South Africa's musical history. The multiracial band's eclectic and uniquely South African rendition of jazz made them a noteworthy jazz band in the international halls of fame. They were once one of the most popular jazz bands in the country, often defying the tyrannical race laws of the country in order to perform."

Author and photographer Val Wilmer recalled that the Blue Notes "literally upturned the London jazz scene, helping to create an exciting climate in which other young players could develop their own ideas about musical freedom." Pianist Keith Tippett stated: "I was bowled over by these guys. There was an inherent freedom and flexibility in the playing, coupled with impressive technique and with a robust muscularity that I'd never heard live before." All About Jazz reviewer Chris May described the group's music as "exuberant jazz, often raucous, sometimes poignant," and noted: "Rising above the trauma that refugee status brings, the band's music... exhibited a resolve to live life to the full."

Marcus Wyatt launched the Blue Notes Tribute Orkestra in 2017 to bring greater recognition to the music of The Blue Notes.

== Discography ==
- Township Bop, Proper PRPCD 013 (2002, recorded 1964)
- Legacy: Live in South Afrika 1964, Ogun OGCD 007 (1995, recorded 1964)
- Blue Notes for Mongezi, Ogun OGD 001/002 (1975)
- Blue Notes in Concert Volume 1, Ogun OG 220 (1978, recorded 1977)
- Before the Wind Changes, Ogun OGCD 037 (2012, recorded 1979)
- Blue Notes for Johnny, Ogun OG 532 (1987)

Compilation

- The Ogun Collection (5-CD box set and booklet with reissues of Legacy: Live in South Afrika 1964, Blue Notes for Mongezi, Blue Notes in Concert, and Blue Notes for Johnny, Ogun OGCD 024-028 (2008)

As the Chris McGregor Group

- Very Urgent, Polydor 184 137 (1968)
- Up to Earth, Polydor 583 072 (unissued), Fledg'ling FLED 3069 (2008)
