= Legacy: Live in South Afrika 1964 =

Live album by The Blue Notes
- Released: 1995
- Recorded: 1964
- Venue: Durban, South Africa
- Genre: Jazz
- Length: 1:12:48
- Label: Ogun; OGCD 007; OGCD 024
- Producer: Giles Quinnell, Hazel Miller, Mike Gavin

The Blue Notes chronology
Blue Notes for Johnny (1987)	Legacy: Live in South Afrika 1964 (1995)	Township Bop (2002)

Legacy: Live in South Afrika 1964 is a live album by The Blue Notes, featuring saxophonists Nick Moyake and Dudu Pukwana, trumpeter Mongezi Feza, pianist Chris McGregor, double bassist Johnny Dyani, and drummer Louis Moholo. It was recorded during 1964 in Durban, South Africa, shortly before the group fled the country's apartheid regime and went into exile in Europe, and was released in 1995 by Ogun Records. The music was reissued in 2008 as part of the compilation The Ogun Collection, and was reissued again as a stand-alone release in 2022.

== Reception ==
Professional ratings
Review scores
Source	Rating
AllMusic	3.5/5 stars
Jazzwise	4/5 stars
The Penguin Guide to Jazz	3/4 stars

In a review for AllMusic, Michael G. Nastos called the album "historic" and "a testament," and noted that the Blue Notes "paved the way as a prelude to a revolution of Afro-jazz that still very much lives."

The authors of The Penguin Guide to Jazz Recordings wrote: "This is an important historical release for anyone interested in the development of the South African strain in British and European jazz. It conveys... something of the raw excitement of those extraordinary years."

Chris May of All About Jazz described the album as "an important historical artefact," and noted that "there is none of the anguish and fury that kicked in after a year or so of arrival in Britain, as the reality of separation from friends, family and homeland took hold."

Jazz Journal's Peter Gamble stated that the album "serves as a potent reminder of exactly what these passionate musicians brought to the British music world," and commented: "The rhythm section is well up to speed..., Dyani solid as a rock, Moholo-Moholo more predictable in his accents than would become the case in later years and McGregor probably wishing his instrument had been tuned before the event."

Writing for Point of Departure, Bill Shoemaker commented: "Not only did the musicians risk life and limb to perform publicly, but even those who attended concerts like this Durban farewell performance were in danger of brutal police treatment and jail. However, there's a disconnect – the music itself. The Blue Notes' music in 1964 was jazz in its purest social form... that evil ruled outside the venue makes their enthusiasm all the more resonant."

In an article for JazzWord, Ken Waxman noted that, although "the seven tracks on Legacy chug along nicely with foot-tapping rhythms and expose a series of high class solos," "its paramount interest is historical." He remarked: "The entire set is firmly anchored in the school of players being recorded by the band's namesake record company – Blue Note – and almost completely beholden to the genre's defining ensemble: Art Blakey's Jazz Messengers."

Jon Turney of London Jazz News stated that the album "captures the definitive line-up of a remarkably talented sextet," and "reveals a tight, inventive band... playing exciting music rooted firmly in hard bop."

Commenting for Itineraries of a Hummingbird, Jason Weiss wrote: "Already the musicians are reaching toward open terrain... Behind the stylistic influences anchoring them to the jazz tradition, amid the interstices, the kernel of their future flowering is clearly found there."

== Track listing ==
1. "Now" (Chris McGregor) – 8:36
2. "Coming Home" (Dudu Pukwana) – 9:08
3. "I Cover the Waterfront" (Johnny Green, Edward Heyman) – 9:22
4. "Two for Sandi" (Dudu Pukwana) – 10:32
5. "Vortex Special" (Chris McGregor) – 12:08
6. "B My Dear" (Dudu Pukwana) – 9:10
7. "Dorkay House" (Dudu Pukwana) – 13:52

== Personnel ==
- Dudu Pukwana – alto saxophone
- Nick Moyake – tenor saxophone
- Mongezi Feza – trumpet
- Chris McGregor – piano
- Johnny Dyani – double bass
- Louis Moholo – drums
