= The Forest and the Zoo =

Live album by Steve Lacy
- Released: 1967
- Recorded: October 8, 1966
- Genre: Jazz
- Length: 40:14
- Label: ESP-Disk

Steve Lacy chronology
Sortie (1966)	The Forest and the Zoo (1967)	Roba (1968)

The Forest and the Zoo is an album by Steve Lacy. It was released by ESP.

== Music and recording ==
The music comes from a concert in Argentina. The quartet is made up of Lacy on soprano saxophone, Enrico Rava on trumpet, Johnny Dyani on bass, and Louis Moholo on drums.

== Reception ==
The Allmusic review by Thom Jurek awarded the album 3½ stars stating "This is not normally considered an essential part of Lacy's very large catalog, but in the 21st century it does deserve to be heartily and critically reexamined. The cover painting by the late artist Bob Thompson makes the set worth owning simply for its beauty. ". An All About Jazz reviewer concluded: "Rather than the liberating spirituality sought after in so much free jazz Lacy's unit remains light-hearted and whimsical, even as it soars above the ground below."

Professional ratings
Review scores
Source	Rating
Allmusic	3.5/5 stars

== Track listing ==
1. "The Forest" - 20:07
2. "The Zoo" - 20:07

All compositions by Steve Lacy
- Recorded on October 8, 1966 in Buenos Aires, Argentina

== Personnel ==
- Steve Lacy - soprano saxophone
- Enrico Rava - trumpet
- Johnny Dyani - bass
- Louis Moholo - drums
