= Zimbabwe (Assagai album) =

Studio album by Assagai
- Released: 1971
- Studio: Nova Sound Studios, London
- Genre: Afro rock
- Length: 35:25
- Label: Philips; 6308 079
- Producer: Dave Watson

Assagai chronology
Assagai (1971)	Zimbabwe (1971)

Reissue cover

Zimbabwe is an album by afro-rock band Assagai. Their second and final release, it was recorded at Nova Sound Studios in London for Vertigo Records, but was instead issued by Philips Records in 1971. The album features saxophonists Dudu Pukwana, Bizo Mngqikana, and Fred Fredericks, trumpeter Mongezi Feza, vocalist Martha Mdenge, drummer Louis Moholo, percussionists Terri Quaye and Smiley De Jonnes, and members of the progressive rock group Jade Warrior, who also contributed three compositions. Cover art was provided by Roger Dean, best known for his work with bands such as Yes, Asia, and Uriah Heep. In 1975, the album was reissued by the Music for Pleasure label with the title Afrorock.

== Reception ==
Professional ratings
Review scores
Source	Rating
AllMusic	4.0/5 stars

In a review for AllMusic, Richie Unterberger called the album "a very interesting fusion of funk, rock, and African influences that's quite forward-looking for the early '70s, with just a bit of psychedelia thrown in," and wrote: "When they're playing in a relatively straightforward Afro-funk vein, they're pretty hot, mixing grinding, groovy riffs with some African beats, wailing melancholy horns, and obviously James Brown-influenced rhythm guitar... Zimbabwe's an interesting, energizing record whose innovations and creativity are worthy of more recognition."

Rob Fitzpatrick of The Guardian stated: "what's most remarkable is what utterly great players they are... 'Barazinbar' and 'Kinzambi' are both super-heavyweight funk, 'Sanga' is flute-led, astral Afro-jazz, 'Dalani' is a straight-up dance floor groover with a prickly piano and rolling horns, while 'La La' is a proto-ambient sunset classic just waiting to be rediscovered."

Exposé Online's Peter Thelen commented: "The ethnic flavors presented throughout this album are powerful and the balance between rock, jazz variations, and African elements work nicely to keep things interesting all the way through. A solid recommendation."

== Track listing ==
1. "Barazinbar" (Glyn Havard) – 6:03
2. "Wanga" (Martha Mdenge) – 2:56
3. "La La" (Martha Mdenge) – 4:29
4. "Dalani" (Dudu Pukwana) – 4:39
5. "Bayeza" (Martha Mdenge) – 3:21
6. "Sanga" (Jon Field) – 4:23
7. "Come Along" (Martha Mdenge) – 4:23
8. "Kinzambi" (Tony Duhig) – 5:45

== Personnel ==
- Dudu Pukwana – alto saxophone, piano
- Bizo Mngqikana – tenor saxophone
- Fred Fredericks – tenor saxophone, baritone saxophone
- Mongezi Feza – trumpet
- Martha Mdenge – vocals
- Louis Moholo – drums
- Terri Quaye – congas
- Smiley De Jonnes – congas, percussion
- Jade Warrior – backing band
