= Nikele Moyake =

South African musician

Nikele (Nik) Moyake (c. 1933 – c. 1966) was born on a farm in Addo in the Eastern Cape of South Africa. He was a musician who played mbaqanga and jazz.

== Music career ==
In the early 1950s Moyake moved to Port Elizabeth where he was a key figure in the jazz scene. He met Dudu Pukwana in Walmer Estate, Port Elizabeth, and he taught both Pukwana and Duke Makatsi how to pay saxophone. Pukwana and Moyake became band mates in The Blue Notes with Chris McGregor, Mongezi Feza, Johnny Dyani, and Louis Moholo. Before The Blue Notes, Moyake was a session musician who was a vocalist in Tete Mbambisa's band the Four Yanks.

Chris McGregor and Nikele Moyake met at the Castle Lager Jazz Festival hosted at Moroka Jabavu Stadium in 1962. Moyake was playing with Mbambisa's band and McGregor was playing at the festival with a septet. Although they both played in different formations, Moyake, McGregor and other members of The Blue Notes met at the festival.

After The Blue Notes went on a successful national tour, the band left South Africa in 1963 heading to Antibes to start their lives in exile. The Blue Notes left South Africa because they were in contravention of several apartheid laws; particularly that no more than three black musicians were allowed to play together (on the pretext of preventing anti-apartheid conspiracies) and that multiracial bands could not play together (Chris McGregor was white).

The band left Antibes and moved to Zurich at the urging of Dollar Brand the artist currently known as Abdullah Ibrahim . When the band played the Antibes Jazz Festival in 1964, Moyake was 31

Born in the early 1930s, Moyake was the oldest member of the band and its most accomplished soloist in its early days. When the group emigrated to Europe en masse in 1964, he became isolated from the rest of the band through a combination of illness and homesickness. Also, as the oldest member, he struggled to adapt to the changes in music brought about by the maturing of his younger bandmates. When the band moved to London, he returned to South Africa in 1965 due to ill health. He played for a few more years before dying from a brain tumour. Ronnie Beer took his place in The Blue Notes.

== Tributes ==
In 1968, the Soul Giants recorded a tribute album dedicated to Nick Moyake called I Remember Nick. Barney Rachabane and Dennis Mpale decided to create the album in his honour. In 2012, The Blue Notes Tribute Orkestra, a tribute band formed to pay homage to the original members, recorded live at The Bird's Eye Jazz Club, Basel, Switzerland in June 2012.

== Discography ==
=== Appearances on 78-rpm 10" recordings ===
As leader

- Brown Sauce / Shabzaza (Meritone)
- Sparletta Four / Faka Steam (Meritone)
- Egg Shells / Sparletta Number 5 (Meritone)
- Nickie's Bossa Nova / Smalie Batho (Envee)

With others

- Ngikhala Ngiya Baleka No. 2 / Madula Shokeng Special with Makgona Tsohle Band (Motella)
- Blue Ska / Small Ngane with Reggie Msomi (Gallo)
- Moli / Gijima Mfana with Mthunzini Girls (Motella)
- Zwelitsha / Majikaduze Twist with West Nkosi (Gallo)
- Kathumba / Tshisa Mdala with West Nkosi(Gallo)

=== Appearances on LPs and CDs ===
- Jazz: The African Sound with Chris McGregor and the Castle Lager Big Band (New Sound, 1963)
- Legacy: Live in South Afrika 1964 with The Blue Notes (Ogun, 1995) recorded in 1964
- Township Bop with The Blue Notes (Proper, 2002) recorded in 1964
- The Ogun Collection with The Blue Notes (Ogun, 2008) compilation
