= Sibanye (We Are One) =

Live album by Louis Moholo-Moholo and Marilyn Crispell
- Released: 2008
- Recorded: June 30, 2007
- Venue: An die Musik Live, Baltimore, Maryland
- Genre: Free jazz
- Label: Intakt Records; CD 145

Sibanye (We Are One) is a live album by drummer Louis Moholo-Moholo and pianist Marilyn Crispell. It was recorded at An die Musik Live in Baltimore, Maryland in June 2007, and was released in 2008 by Intakt Records. The recording captures the duo's first musical encounter, and features a completely improvised set, with no prior discussion as to the length or nature of the music to be performed.

== Reception ==
Professional ratings
Review scores
Source	Rating
DownBeat	4/5 stars
All About Jazz	5/5 stars

Writing for DownBeat, Alain Drouot commented: "Without any planning, the pair launches into a series of free improvisations that grab the attention from start to finish... The result is a thoughtful work and a beautiful collaboration that succeeds because Crispell and Moholo make some commendable efforts to bridge their musical worlds and to create an original and personal universe."

In a review for All About Jazz, Lloyd N. Peterson Jr. wrote: "Only once in a great while does a recording come along that influences my thoughts on creativity, sound and spirituality in music. Sibanye (We Are One)... is one of those recordings... As is the case with most great recordings, this one has an energy and intensity from the first note to the last and will remain a timeless testament to the human spirit. It doesn't get much better than this." In a separate article for All About Jazz, David Adler called Crispell "one of our most adaptable and imaginative pianists, a team player par excellence," and stated that the pieces on the album are "remarkable for their overall restraint. Crispell and Moholo are able to brainstorm at a low and enticing volume, bringing out subtle sonic details without losing intensity."

Ed Hazell, writing for Point of Departure, remarked that "the spirit of discovery and a sense of joy are palpable" on the album, and commented: "They almost instantly find that they are free to go wherever they please in one another's company, and the music quickly grows expansive and adventurous... From the start, they sound eager to create and explore, and thoroughly pleased with their partner's contributions to the joint musical enterprise... The music is buoyant, almost giddy with the sheer joy of creation. Unexpected confluences and serendipitous incidents crowd one another as they play... it's the sense of sudden recognition, of baring hidden sadness and sharing common joys, of genuine surprise and gladness that lifts this performance beyond the mere mechanics of free improvisation into something majestic and touchingly human. A tremendous album."

== Track listing ==
1. "Improvise, Don't Compromise" – 12:40
2. "Moment of Truth" – 7:08
3. "Journey" – 11:49
4. "Soze (Never)" – 6:28
5. "Phendula (Reply)" – 7:07
6. "Reflect" – 7:21
7. "Sibanye (We Are One)" – 6:18

== Personnel ==
- Marilyn Crispell – piano
- Louis Moholo-Moholo – drums
