= The Ogun Collection =

Compilation album by The Blue Notes
- Released: 2008
- Recorded: 1964–1987
- Genre: Free jazz
- Label: Ogun; OGCD 024–028

The Blue Notes chronology
Township Bop (2002)	The Ogun Collection (2008)	Before the Wind Changes (2012)

The Ogun Collection is a five-CD box set compilation album by The Blue Notes, featuring saxophonists Nick Moyake and Dudu Pukwana, trumpeter Mongezi Feza, pianist Chris McGregor, double bassist Johnny Dyani, and drummer Louis Moholo. It brings together the contents of four albums previously released by Ogun Records: Legacy: Live in South Afrika 1964 (recorded in 1964, released in 1995); Blue Notes for Mongezi (recorded in 1975, released in 1976); Blue Notes in Concert (recorded in 1977, released in 1978); and Blue Notes for Johnny (recorded and released in 1987). The latter three albums appear here in expanded form. The Ogun Collection, which also includes a booklet containing photos and essays, was released by Ogun in 2008. In 2022, the label reissued all four albums as stand-alone releases, using the expanded versions found on the compilation.

== Reception ==
Professional ratings
Review scores
Source	Rating
All About Jazz	5/5 stars
The Guardian	4/5 stars
Jazzwise	4/5 stars

The editors and critics of The Village Voice ranked the album #7 in their list of the top 10 jazz reissues of 2008. The Wire's editors included it in their "2008 Rewind," listing the year's top releases.

In a review for The Guardian, John Fordham called the album "historic," and noted that the band's arrival in London "brought new sounds and a new attitude that had an incalculable influence."

A writer for Jazzwise wrote: "there was something truly special about these guys from the outset. Even when apart and engaged in their own projects, they were still Blue Notes first and the music they shared poured out into their solo work. And yet it is hard to imagine six more individually distinctive musical stylists."

Writing for Point of Departure, Bill Shoemaker commented: "The real power of a box set of recordings lies in it potential to alter your understanding of the history that you think you already know... Some box sets accomplish this through connecting dots previously thought to be unrelated. Others just grab you by the collar until it all sinks in... The Ogun Collection is one of the few that does both."

JazzWord's Ken Waxman called the Blue Notes "arguably the best jazz band to emerge fully formed from Apartheid-era South Africa," one that "energized European – especially British – jazz by intermixing African rhythms and melodies, Hard Bop styling plus emerging Free Music," and stated that the album "leaves us with many examples of the skill and excitement the band exhibited in its time."

Jason Weiss of Itineraries of a Hummingbird described the album as "marvelous," and remarked: "Though the band had effectively broken up as a working ensemble by the late '60s, still it reunited occasionally: the Ogun box demonstrates their unique longevity, that of a family bond forged in exile."

== Track listing ==
=== Disc 1: Legacy: Live in South Afrika 1964 ===
1. "Now" (Chris McGregor) – 8:36
2. "Coming Home" (Dudu Pukwana) – 9:08
3. "I Cover the Waterfront" (Johnny Green, Edward Heyman) – 9:22
4. "Two for Sandi" (Dudu Pukwana) – 10:32
5. "Vortex Special" (Chris McGregor) – 12:08
6. "B My Dear" (Dudu Pukwana) – 9:10
7. "Dorkay House" (Dudu Pukwana) – 13:52

=== Disc 2: Blue Notes for Mongezi part one ===
1. "Blue Notes for Mongezi: First Movement" – 42:14
2. "Blue Notes for Mongezi: Second Movement" – 36:31

=== Disc 3: Blue Notes for Mongezi part two ===
1. "Blue Notes for Mongezi: Third Movement" – 41:07
2. "Blue Notes for Mongezi: Fourth Movement" – 37:11

=== Disc 4: Blue Notes in Concert ===
1. "Ilizwi" (Dudu Pukwana) – 3:58
2. "Msenge Mabelelo" (Tete Mbambisa) – 8:36
3. "Nqamakwwe" (Chris McGregor) – 5:42
4. "Manje" (Chris McGregor) – 13:15
5. "Funky Boots" (Gary Windo, Nick Evans) – 0:30
6. "We Nduna" (Traditional) – 10:06
7. "Kudala (Long Ago)" (Traditional) – 9:04
8. "Funky Boots" (Gary Windo, Nick Evans) – 0:39
9. "Mama Ndoluse" (Traditional) – 2:21
10. "Abalimanga" (Traditional) – 3:27

=== Disc 5: Blue Notes for Johnny ===
1. "Funk Dem Dudu" (Johnny Dyani) – 7:42 / "To Erico" (Dudu Pukwana) – 2:18
2. "Eyomzi" (Johnny Dyani) – 4:53
3. "Ntyilo Ntyilo" (Traditional) – 7:55
4. "Blues for Nick" (Dudu Pukwana) – 4:39
5. "Monks & Mbizo" (Chris McGregor and Louis Moholo) – 9:51
6. "Ithi Ggi" (Johnny Dyani) – 7:48 / "Nkosi Sikelele L'Afrika" (Traditional) – 0:44
7. "Funk Dem Dudu" (alternate take) (Johnny Dyani) – 5:30
8. "Eyomzi" (alternate take) (Johnny Dyani) – 5:01
9. "Funk Dem Dudu" (alternate take) (Johnny Dyani) – 7:46 / "To Erico" (alternate take) (Dudu Pukwana) – 0:57

== Personnel ==
- Dudu Pukwana – alto saxophone
- Nick Moyake – tenor saxophone (disc 1)
- Mongezi Feza – trumpet (disc 1)
- Chris McGregor – piano
- Johnny Dyani – double bass (discs 1–4)
- Louis Moholo – drums
