= Louis Moholo =

South African jazz drummer (1940–2025)

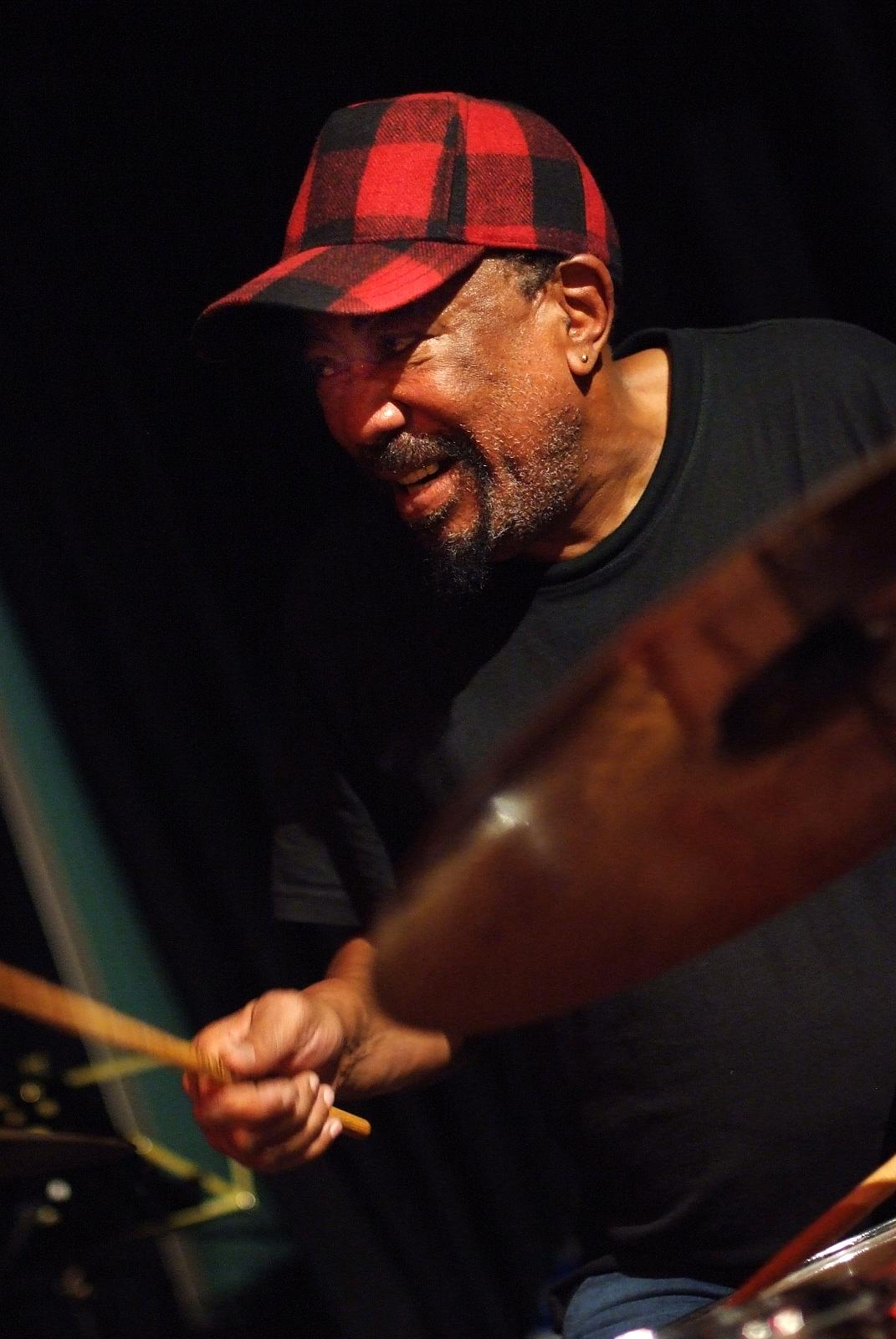
- Moholo in 2008

Background information
- Also known as: Louis Moholo-Moholo
- Born: Louis Tebogo Moholo; 10 March 1940; Cape Town, Cape Province, South Africa
- Died: 13 June 2025 (aged 85) Cape Town, South Africa
- Genres: Jazz
- Occupation: Musician
- Instrument: Drums
- Formerly of: The Blue Notes; Assagai; Brotherhood of Breath

Louis Tebogo Moholo (10 March 1940 – 13 June 2025) was a South African jazz drummer. He was a member of several notable bands, including The Blue Notes, the Brotherhood of Breath and Assagai.

== Life and career ==
Born in Langa, Cape Town, South Africa, on 10 March 1940, Moholo formed The Blue Notes with Chris McGregor, Johnny Dyani, Nikele Moyake, Mongezi Feza and Dudu Pukwana, and emigrated to Europe with them in 1964, eventually settling in 1965 in London, where he formed part of a South African exile community that made an important contribution to British jazz. In 1966, he toured Buenos Aires, Argentina, where he performed at the Theatron with Steve Lacy, Johnny Dyani and Enrico Rava and recorded the album The Forest and the Zoo with the same musicians. He was a member of the Brotherhood of Breath, a big band comprising several South African exiles and leading musicians of the British free jazz scene in the 1970s and was the founder of Viva la Black and The Dedication Orchestra. His first album under his own name, Spirits Rejoice on Ogun Records, is considered a classic example of the combination of British and South African players. In the early 1970s, Moholo was also a member of the afro-rock band Assagai and Dudu Pukwana's Spear.

Moholo played with many musicians, including Derek Bailey, Steve Lacy, Evan Parker, Enrico Rava, Roswell Rudd, Irène Schweizer, Cecil Taylor, John Tchicai, Archie Shepp, Peter Brötzmann, Mike Osborne, Keith Tippett, Elton Dean and Harry Miller.

Moholo returned to South Africa in September 2005, performing with George E. Lewis at the UNYAZI Festival of Electronic Music in Johannesburg. He subsequently used the name Louis Moholo-Moholo, because the surname was more ethnically authentic. In March 2017 South African promoter Slow Life produced a show at the Olympia Bakery in Kalk Bay, Cape Town, where Moholo performed along with Mark Fransman, Reza Khota, Keenan Ahrends and Brydon Bolton.

Moholo died after a lengthy illness in Cape Town, on 13 June 2025, at the age of 85.

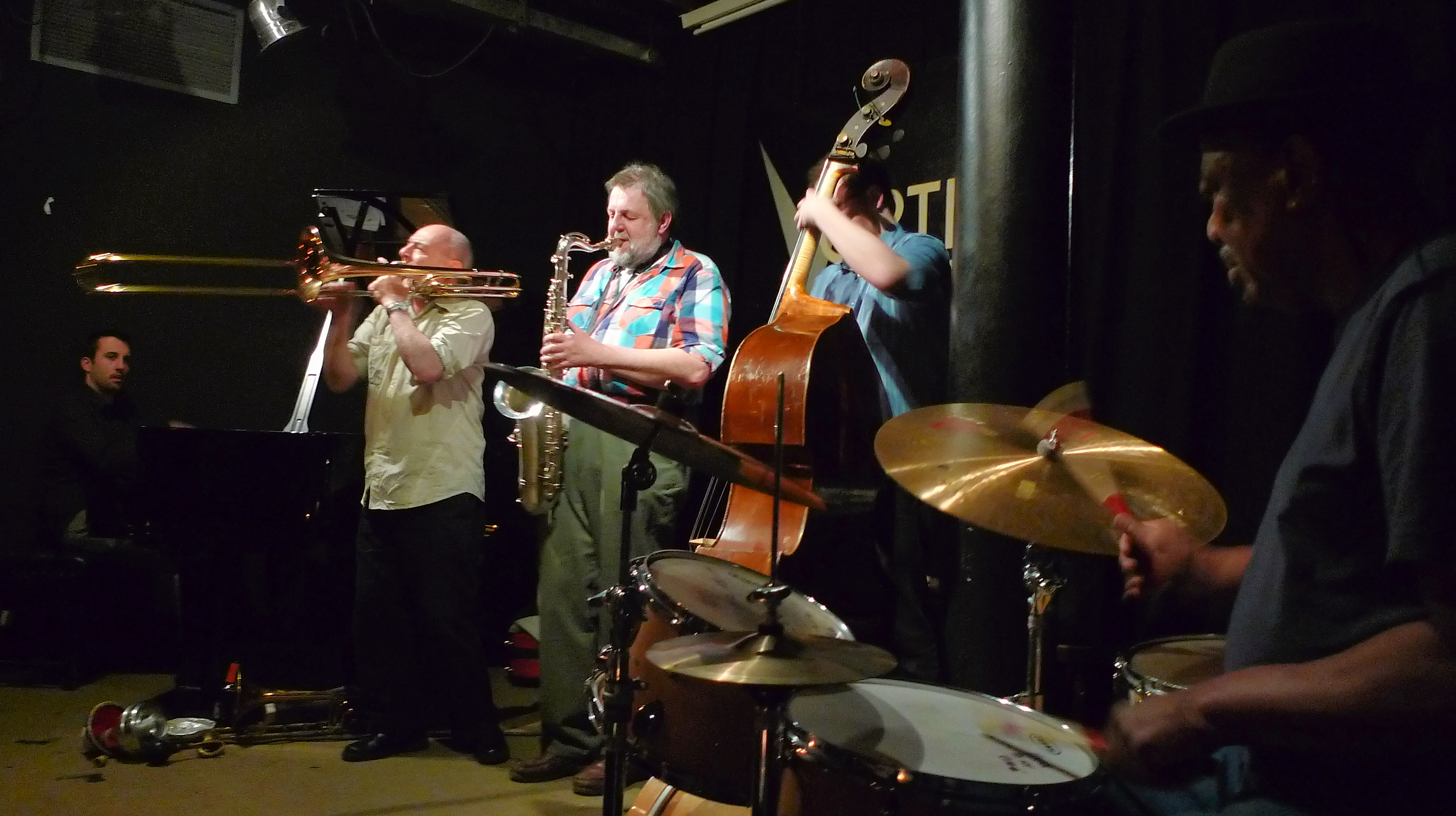
Louis Moholo Moholo Quintet (2011) with Paul Dunmall (saxophone), Alan Tomlinson (trombone), Alexander Hawkins (piano) and Olie Brice (bass)

== Discography ==
=== As leader ===
- Louis Moholo; Spirits Rejoice!; Ogun: OG520 (1978)
- Louis Moholo with Larry Stabbins, Keith Tippett; Tern (Live); FMP-SAJ-43/44 (1983)
- Louis Moholo's Viva La Black; Ogun: OG533 (1988)
- Louis Moholo's Viva La Black; Exile; Ogun: OGCD003 (1991)
- Louis Moholo's Viva La Black; Freedom Tour – Live in South Africa 1993; Ogun: OGCD006 (1994)
- Louis Moholo Moholo meets Mervyn Africa, Pule Pheto, Keith Tippett; Mpumi; Ogun: OGCD014 (2002)
- Louis Moholo-Moholo with Stan Tracey; Khumbula (Remember); Ogun: OGCD016 (2005)
- Louis Moholo-Moholo Septet; Bra Louis – Bra Tebs + Louis Moholo-Moholo Octet; Spirits Rejoice!; Ogun: OGCD017/018 (2006)
- Louis Moholo-Moholo's Viva La Black; Live at Ruvo; Ogun: OGCD 020 (2004)
- Louis Moholo-Moholo Duets with Marilyn Crispell; Sibanye (We Are One) (Live); Intakt Records: Intact CD 145 (2008)
- Louis Moholo-Moholo Unit; An Open Letter to My Wife Mpumi; Ogun: OGCD031 (2009)
- Louis Moholo-Moholo, Dudu Pukwana, Johnny Dyani with Rev. Frank Wright; Spiritual Knowledge and Grace (Live); Ogun: OGCD035 (2011)
- Louis Moholo-Moholo Unit; For the Blue Notes (Live); Ogun: OGCD042 (2014)
- Louis Moholo-Moholo Quartet; 4 Blokes; Ogun: OGCD043 (2014)
- Louis Moholo-Moholo with Frode Gjerstad; Sult (Live); FMR: FMRCD069 (2014)
- Louis Moholo-Moholo with Frode Gjerstad, Nick Stephens, Fred Lonberg-Holm; Distant Groove; FRM Records: FMRCD385-0115 (2015)
- Louis Moholo-Moholo's Five Blokes; Uplift the People (Live); Ogun: OGCD047 (2018)
- Louis Moholo-Moholo's Five Blokes; Live @ the Vortex Jazz Club; Vortex (2020)

=== Collaborations ===
- Irène Schweizer, Rüdiger Carl, Louis Moholo; Messer; FMP: FMP 0290 (1976)
- Irène Schweizer, Rüdiger Carl, Louis Moholo; Tuned Boots; FMP: FMP 0550 (1978)
- Peter Brötzmann, Harry Miller, Louis Moholo; The Nearer the Bone, the Sweeter the Meat; FMP: FMP 0690 (1979)
- Keith Tippett & Louis Moholo; No Gossip; FMP: SAJ-28 (1980)
- Peter Brötzmann, Harry Miller, Louis Moholo; Opened, But Hardly Touched; FMP: FMP0840/50 (1981)
- Irène Schweizer & Louis Moholo (Live); Intakt: 006/1987 (1988)
- Cecil Taylor & Louis Moholo-Moholo; Remembrance; FMP: FMP CD 004 (1989)
- Vincent Chancey, Φλώρος Φλωρίδης (Floros Floridis), Peter Kowald, Louis Moholo; Human Aspect; OM: B/002 (1990)
- Derek Bailey, Thebe Lipere & Louis Moholo; Village Life (Live); Incus: CD09 (1992)
- John Law & Louis Moholo; The Boat is Sinking, Aparteid is Sinking; Impetus: IMP CD 19322
- Louis Moholo / Evan Parker / Pule Pheto / Gibo Pheto / Barry Guy Quintet; Bush Fire; Ogun: OGCD009 (1996)
- Evan Parker, Steve Beresford, John Edwards, Louis Moholo; Foxes Fox; Emanem 4035 (1999)
- Hasse Poulsen, Peter Friis Lielsen, Louis Moholo; Copenhagen; AV-ART: AACD 1010 (2000)
- Roger Smith & Louis Moholo-Moholo; The Butterfly and the Bee; Emanem 4114 (2005)
- Foxes Fox (Evan Parker, Steve Beresford, John Edwards, Louis Moholo); Naan Tso; Psi: psi 05.07 (2005)
- Frode Gjerstad, Nick Stephens & Louis Moholo-Moholo; Quiddity (2007); Loose Torque: LT 019 (2009)
- Wadada Leo Smith & Louis Moholo-Moholo; Ancestors; TUM: TUM CD 029 (2012)
- Alexander Hawkins & Louis Moholo-Moholo; Keep Your Heart Straight; Ogun: OGCD 039 (2012)
- Livio Minafra & Louis Moholo-Moholo; Born Free (Live); (2015)
- Canto Generàl featuring Louis Moholo-Moholo; Rebel Flames; Ogun: OGCD 044 (2015)

=== with Chris McGregor ===
- Chris McGregor Group; Very Urgent; Polydor (1968)
- Chris McGregor Septet; Up to Earth (1969); Fledg'ling: FLED 3069 (2008)
- Chris McGregor Trio; Our Prayer (1969); Fledg'ling: FLED 3070 (2008)

=== with The Brotherhood of Breath ===
- Chris McGregor's Brotherhood of Breath; RCA/Neon (1971)
- Brotherhood; RCA (1972)
- Bremen to Bridgwater (1971/1975); Cuneiform Rune, (2004)
- Live at Willisau; Ogun: OG 100 (1974)
- Procession; Ogun: OG 524 (1978)
- Yes Please; In and Out: IaO 1001 (1981)
- Country Cooking; Virgin/Venture (1988)
- En Concert a Banlieues Bleues with Archie Shepp; 52e Rue Est: RE CD 017 (1989)
- Travelling Somewhere (1973); Cuneiform Rune (2001)
- Eclipse at Dawn (1971); Cuneiform Rune (2008)

=== with Dudu Pukwana ===
- Dudu Phukwana and the "Spears"; Quality (1969)
- Dudu Pukwana & Spear; In the Townships; Caroline Records (1974)
- Dudu Pukwana & Spear; Flute Music; Caroline Records (1975)
- Black Horse (1975); Black Lion Vault Remastered (2012)
- Diamond Express; Arista Freedom: AF 1041 (1977)

=== with the Blue Notes ===
- Blue Notes for Mongezi; Ogun: OGD 001/002 (1976)
- Blue Notes in Concert Volume 1; Ogun: OG 220 (1978)
- Blue Notes for Johnny; Ogun: OG 532 (1987)
- Legacy: Live in South Afrika 1964 (1964); Ogun: OGCD 007 (1995)
- Township Bop (1964); Proper Records: PRP CD 013 (2002)
- The Ogun Collection; Ogun: OGCD 024-028 (2008) compilation
- Before the Wind Changes; Ogun: OGCD 037 (2012)

=== with Assagai ===
- Assagai; Vertigo (1971)
- Zimbabwe; Phillips (1971)

=== with Peter Brotzmann Group ===
- Alarm; FMP: FMP 1030 (1983)

=== with Curtis Clark Quintet ===
- Letter to South Africa; Nimbus West Records: NS501C (1986)
- Live At The Bimhuis; Nimbus West Records: NS505C (1988)

=== with The Dedication Orchestra ===
- Spirits Rejoice; Ogun: OGCD 101 (1992)
- Ixesha (Time); Ogun: OGCD 102/103 (1994)

=== with Harry Miller ===
- Family Affair; Ogun: OG 310 (1977)
- Which Way Now (1975); Cuneiform Records: Rune 233 (2006)
- Full Steam Ahead (1975–77); Reel Recordings: RR012 (2009)
- Different Times, Different Places (1973–1976); Ogun Records: OGCD 041 (2013)
- Different Times, Different Places Volume 2 (1977–1982); Ogun Records: OGCD 045 (2016)

=== with Circulasione Totale Orchestra ===
- Open Port (1998); Circulasione Totale: CT 09 (2008)
- Bandwidth; Rune Grammofon: RCD2089 (2009)
- PhilaOslo; Circulasione Totale: CT 12 (2011)
- Tampere-08; Circulasione Totale: CT 053 (2020)

=== As sideman ===
- Roswell Rudd; Roswell Rudd; America Records: 6114 (1971)
- Haaz & Company; Unlawful Noise; KGB Records: KGB 7076 (1976)
- Keith Tippett's Ark; Frames (Music for an Imaginary Film); Ogun: OGD 003/004 (1978)
- Triple Trip Touch with Frank Lowe & Louis Moholo; TTT Live! Konzert Basel / What About JAZZ Today!; Independent (1984)
- Dennis Gonzalez Dallas-London Sextet; Catechism; Daagnim Records 1 (1988)
- Cat O'Nine Tails; Hoki-Poki; Wire Cassettes: wire 001 (1990)
- Sean Bergin & Radio Freedom All Stars; Jazz for Freedom; VARAgram: VCD 006-02 (1990)
- Dennis Gonzalez Band of Sorcerers; Hymn for the Perfect Heart of a Pearl; Konnex Records: KCD 5026 (1991)
- Tristan Honsinger Quintet/ Sextet/ and with Mola Sylla; Travelogues – Music for Sasha Waltz & Guests; Independent (1995)
- Tristan Honsinger 5tet; Map of Moods; FMP: FMP CD 76 (1996)
- New York Art Quartet; Old Stuff; Cuneiform Rune 300 (2010)
- Keith Tippett Tapestry Orchestra; Live at Le Mans; redeye008 (2007)
- Elton Dean's Ninesense; Ninesense Suite; Jazzwerkstatt: jw107 (2011)
- Jon Corbett's Dangerous Musics; Kongens Gade; Leo Records: LR 617 (2011)
- Mike Osborne & Friends; Live at the Peanuts Club (1975); Jazz in Britain: JIB-07-S-DL (2020)
- Karl Evangelista w/Alexander Hawkins, Louis Moholo-Moholo, & Trevor Watts, Apura!; Astral Spirits (2020)

== Other sources ==
- Philippe Carles, André Clergeat, and Jean-Louis Comolli, Dictionnaire du Jazz, Paris, 1994.
