= Keep Your Heart Straight =

Studio album by Alexander Hawkins and Louis Moholo-Moholo
- Released: 2012
- Recorded: October 24, 2011
- Studio: The Fish Factory, London
- Genre: Free jazz
- Label: Ogun; OGCD 039

Alexander Hawkins chronology
All There, Ever Out (2011)	Keep Your Heart Straight (2012)	Step Wide, Step Deep (2013)

Louis Moholo-Moholo chronology
Spiritual Knowledge and Grace (2011)	Keep Your Heart Straight (2012)	For the Blue Notes (2014)

Keep Your Heart Straight is an album by pianist Alexander Hawkins and drummer Louis Moholo-Moholo. Featuring a mix of composed and freely-improvised material, it was recorded on October 24, 2011, at the Fish Factory in London, and was released in 2012 by Ogun Records.

== Reception ==
Professional ratings
Review scores
Source	Rating
Tom Hull – on the Web	B+

In a review for JazzWord, Ken Waxman wrote: "Hawkins needs all his keyboard skills finely honed when going up against Moholo-Moholo. Practically every track demonstrates some subtle meeting of the sinewy and the sophisticated... Hawkins appears to have the skills he needs to play any sort of improvised music from standards to on-the-spot creativity. Plus Keep Your Heart Straight demonstratess he can hold his own with older Jazz masters."

Writer Richard Williams called the album "an exceptional document," and stated: "It's a record on which Hawkins reminds his listeners that the piano, too, is a percussion instrument. He and Moholo attack the music with a brusque desire to get to the heart of the matter, even when they're playing romantic ballads."

Chris Searle of the Morning Star described the album as "strikingly powerful," "Cape Town and Oxford forging an unlikely partnership with four decades between them," and commented: "it is as if there are two drummers drumming, so much has Moholo-Moholo's pounding and subtle brilliance woven into Hawkins's music over their years of playing together as a touring duo and in the drummer's larger band."

Writing for Point of Departure, Ed Hazell called the musicians "kindred spirits despite the wide difference in their ages," and remarked: "Their joyful duo album displays a rapport that is at times almost telepathic. Like his elder, Hawkins... always leads with his heart, but his intelligence and considerable technique follow closely behind. Together pianist and drummer play with exuberance and openheartedness, yet with a great deal of order and unity, whether they play on compositions or freely improvise."

In an article for Cadence, Jason Bivins wrote: "Alongside the fabulous young pianist Alexander Hawkins, Moholo-Moholo generates music of marvelously contained energy, often sounding spindly and intervallic but with a real gravity that comes as much from the space between notes as from any thunder... what makes the pianist even more arresting than other players who can work in similar areas is his unflinching lyricism, a truly compelling dimension of his work... They audibly delight in each other's playing, diving with real zeal into the more boisterous moments but equally engaged in the sparse silent passages."

== Track listing ==
1. "Heavy Manners" – 14:18
2. "Amaxesha Osizi (Times of Sorrow)" – 7:33
3. "Hear Our Hearts" – 8:13
4. "If I Should Lose You" – 5:25
5. "Pure Vision" – 5:43
6. "Lakutshon' Ilanga" – 6:03
7. "Catch You On the Rebound" – 5:47
8. "Prelude to a Kiss" – 4:39
9. "Keep Your Heart Straight" – 7:41

== Personnel ==
- Alexander Hawkins – piano
- Louis Moholo-Moholo – drums, percussion
