= Allen Kwela =

South African kwela and jazz guitarist

Allen Kwela (September 10, 1936 in Chesterville, Durban – July 1, 2003) was a kwela and jazz guitarist from South Africa. He was raised around Durban where he herded cattle and learned music after making a tin guitar. He began in Kwela with Spokes Mashiyane, but later branched into jazz. His 2002 work The Broken Strings of Allen Kwela received award nominations for jazz. He has been said to have become a "revered figure" and "legendary" in South African jazz. He died in Johannesburg on 30 June 2003 and left a wife and four children.
