= Up to Earth =

Studio album by The Chris McGregor Septet
- Released: 2008
- Recorded: 1969
- Studio: Sound Techniques, London
- Genre: Free jazz
- Length: 38:01
- Label: Fledg'ling; FLED 3069
- Producer: Joe Boyd

Chris McGregor chronology
Thunderbolt (1997)	Up to Earth (2008)	Our Prayer (2008)

Up to Earth is an album by the Chris McGregor Septet, led by pianist McGregor, and featuring saxophonists Evan Parker, Dudu Pukwana, and John Surman, trumpeter Mongezi Feza, bassists Barre Phillips and Danny Thompson, and drummer Louis Moholo. It was recorded at Sound Techniques in London during 1969, and was released by Fledg'ling Records in 2008.

Like Our Prayer, recorded at the same session, Up to Earth was originally scheduled to be issued by Polydor Records in 1969; however, the release was cancelled at the last minute due to financial concerns.

== Reception ==
Professional ratings
Review scores
Source	Rating
AllMusic	4/5 stars
The Guardian	3/5 stars
Tom Hull – on the Web	A−
The Jazz Mann	4/5 stars
Record Collector	5/5 stars

In a review for AllMusic, Thom Jurek wrote: "these four tracks certainly walk on the outside edge of jazz and more than flirt with plenty of free playing. That said, there is also great structure to the music found here, inspired arrangements that allow a maximum of freedom without an ounce of self-indulgence... This session, with excellent sound and presence, is a glorious addition to the continually expanding McGregor canon."

The Guardian's John Fordham described the album as "volcanic Albert Ayler and Cecil Taylor-influenced free-improvisation joined to an eccentric assortment of freebop, lurching swing and oompah street-marches," and remarked: "the collective hollering is balanced with ruggedly coherent solos... the album bursts with gleeful energy. Nearly 40 years on, it still sounds like jazz at the edge."

Clifford Allen of All About Jazz praised the musicians' "understanding of when to let the music run with virile energy and when to yoke it with crispness, delicacy and elan," and commented: "Up to Earth is a very welcome addition to the available landscape of these South African expatriates, and to the climate of improvised music as a whole." AAJ's Andrey Henkin noted that, in relation to the music on Very Urgent, "McGregor's irrepressible spirit is becoming more obvious with brasher arranging and more open forms that owe a debt to the European avant-garde."

Writing for The Jazz Mann, Tim Owen stated that the album "stands up well alongside acknowledged classics of the genre," and likened the horn arrangements on "Years Ago Now" to "big band swing, albeit with all-out free expression."

In an article for The Independent, Andy Gill wrote: "The four blasts of semi-improvised jazz... demonstrate the symbiosis at work between the Europeans' free-jazz intensity and the Africans' more joyously euphoric sensibilities. There are echoes of Sun Ra in the horn figures of 'Years Ago Now', while the unison riff of 'Up To Earth' recalls Bird'n'Diz's 'Salt Peanuts' in its brash good humour."

Paul Rigby of Record Collector called the album "magnificent" and "blissful," and stated: "there are no holds barred here, the arrangements roaming the savannah of McGregor's mind. It's not chaotic, as some free jazz can be, because McGregor calls the shots, while the rest of the musicians play with one eye on their leader's cues."

== Track listing ==
1. "Moonlight Aloe" (Chris McGregor) – 10:46
2. "Yickytickee / Union Special" (Chris McGregor) – 8:39
3. "Up to Earth" (Chris McGregor) – 7:16
4. "Years Ago Now" (Chris McGregor / Louis Moholo) – 11:20

== Personnel ==
- Chris McGregor – piano
- Dudu Pukwana – alto saxophone
- Evan Parker – tenor saxophone
- John Surman – baritone saxophone, bass clarinet
- Mongezi Feza – trumpet
- Barre Phillips – bass (tracks 1 and 3)
- Danny Thompson – bass (tracks 2 and 4)
- Louis Moholo – drums
