= Township Bop =

Studio album by The Blue Notes
- Released: 2002
- Recorded: Early 1964
- Venue: Cape Town, South Africa
- Genre: Jazz
- Length: 59:27
- Label: Proper; PRP CD 013
- Producer: Joop Visser

The Blue Notes chronology
Legacy: Live in South Afrika 1964 (1995)	Township Bop (2002)	The Ogun Collection (2008)

Township Bop is an album by The Blue Notes. Documenting the group's first studio session, it was recorded during early 1964 for the South African Broadcasting Corporation in Cape Town, South Africa, shortly before the musicians fled the country's apartheid regime and went into exile in Europe. The album was not released until 2002, when it was issued on CD by Proper Records. All of the tracks feature saxophonists Dudu Pukwana and Nick Moyake, as well as pianist Chris McGregor, while a number of the tracks include musicians who would not go on to become core members of the band: trumpeter Dennis Mpali (replaced by Mongezi Feza), bassists Mongezi Velelo and Sammy Maritz (replaced by Johnny Dyani), and drummer Early Mabuza (replaced by Louis Moholo).

== Reception ==
Professional ratings
Review scores
Source	Rating
The Guardian	3/5 stars

In a review for The Guardian, John Fordham noted that the album depicts "a hugely important band at an embryonic stage," and called it "an intriguing document of the origins of one of the most influential intrusions on the British jazz scene since the Original Dixieland Jazz Band showed up in London in the 1920s." He wrote: "the emphasis is on an Art Blakey-like American hard bop, but with a singing sound and directness of its own."

A reviewer for the BBC Music Magazine stated that the album "encapsulates an extremely poignant chapter of jazz history," and commented: "The session is a little rough and ready at times and the intonation is sometimes sour, but the swing and drive of the band is compelling... These recordings reveal the enormous potential of this band, which was later realised in Europe and the UK."

Duncan Heining of All About Jazz remarked: "Through the record's 14 tracks, it's possible to see the group emerge and grow... But it's the bringing together of bop elements with the wilder music of the different tribes or 'nationalities' of their homeland, which begins to suggest something more unique and distinctive."

== Track listing ==
1. "Schoolboy" (Dudu Pukwana) – 3:49
2. "Now" (Chris McGregor) – 5:02
3. "The Blessing Light (Take 1)" (Dudu Pukwana) – 5:34
4. "The Blessing Light (Take 2)" (Dudu Pukwana) – 5:37
5. "Take the Coltrane" (Duke Ellington) – 2:13
6. "Angelica" (Duke Ellington) – 4:27
7. "Kay (Take 1)" (Dudu Pukwana) – 3:47
8. "Kay (Take 2)" (Dudu Pukwana) – 3:48
9. "Vortex Special" (Chris McGregor) – 5:24
10. "Never Let Me Go" (Jay Livingston, Ray Evans) – 4:56
11. "Izithunywa" (Dudu Pukwana) – 3:47
12. "Blue Nick" (Dudu Pukwana) – 4:03
13. "Coming Home" (Dudu Pukwana) – 2:58
14. "Dick's Pick" (Chris McGregor) – 3:26

== Personnel ==
- Dudu Pukwana – alto saxophone
- Nick Moyake – tenor saxophone
- Dennis Mpali – trumpet (track 5)
- Mongezi Feza – trumpet (tracks 6–14)
- Chris McGregor – piano
- Mongezi Velelo – double bass (tracks 1–2)
- Sammy Maritz – double bass (tracks 3–11)
- Johnny Dyani – double bass (tracks 12–14)
- Early Mabuza – drums (tracks 1–8)
- Louis Moholo – drums (tracks 9–14)
