= In the Townships =

Studio album by Dudu Pukwana and Spear
- Released: 1974
- Recorded: August 25, 1973; November 10, 1973
- Studio: The Manor Studio, Shipton-on-Cherwell, Oxfordshire, England
- Genre: Cape jazz
- Length: 35:30
- Label: Caroline; C 1504
- Producer: John Jack, Steve Verroca

Dudu Pukwana chronology
Dudu Phukwana and the "Spears" (1969)	In the Townships (1974)	Flute Music (1975)

In the Townships is an album by South African alto saxophonist, pianist, and composer Dudu Pukwana. It was recorded during 1973 at The Manor Studio in Shipton-on-Cherwell, Oxfordshire, England, and was released in 1974 by Caroline Records. On the album, Pukwana is joined by members of his band Spear: tenor saxophonist Bizo Mngqikana, trumpeter Mongezi Feza, double bassist Harry Miller, and drummer Louis Moholo.

== Reception ==
Professional ratings
Review scores
Source	Rating
AllMusic	4.5/5 stars
New Musical Express	7/10
The Penguin Guide to Jazz	3.5/4 stars
Tom Hull – on the Web	A

In a review for AllMusic, Brian Olewnick called the album a "glorious, ferocious recording" and "one of the pinnacles of the music created by the South African expatriates who settled in England in the '60s and melded with the free jazz community therein." He commented: "The pieces here are largely riff-based, but what incredibly infectious and funky riffs these are... these melodies are so utterly catchy that one can wallow in them for hours, listening with giddy enjoyment as these musicians overlay and embroider them with uproarious playing... that all-too-brief moment where musicians fleeing the racist restrictions of South Africa found a welcome home and fertile creative soil in England is nowhere better represented. Highly recommended."

The authors of The Penguin Guide to Jazz Recordings described the album as "a minor classic," and wrote: "it uses kwela rhythms in a way that reflects a deep understanding of bop. Vocals and additional percussion suggest a much larger band."

Don Palmer of Spin stated that the musicians "come across with a rag-tag precision that's as thoroughly compelling as it is gritty," and remarked: "Pukwana takes center stage with probing lines that encompass, without quoting, Rollins, Ayler, Coleman, and Adderley. And Pukwana does it all with the cathartic joy of a bluesman talkin' about the long road home."

Writing for Bells, Jack Cooke commented: "This is a hectic, totally non-romantic music, reflecting the life-style that produced it... A strong rhythmic base, repetitive yet flexible, loose and essentially danceable, shapes and fuses with the melody lines. The singing doesn't offer a 'words-and-music' element, simply an additional human-voice texture... these vocals are highly effective and contribute much to the individual flavour of this music."

== Track listing ==
"Sonia" composed by Mongezi Feza. Remaining tracks composed by Dudu Pukwana.

1. "Baloyi" – 5:18
2. "Ezilalini" – 6:43
3. "Zukude" – 5:43
4. "Sonia" – 3:28
5. "Angel Nemali" – 6:04
6. "Nobomvu" – 4:00
7. "Sekela Khuluma" – 4:14

== Personnel ==
- Dudu Pukwana – alto saxophone, piano, congas, percussion, vocals
- Bizo Mngqikana – tenor saxophone, percussion, vocals
- Mongezi Feza – trumpet, congas, percussion, vocals
- Harry Miller – double bass, electric bass
- Louis Moholo – drums, percussion
