= Witchdoctor's Son =

Studio album by Johnny Dyani with John Tchicai and Dudu Pukwana
- Released: 1978
- Recorded: March 15, 1978
- Genre: Free jazz
- Length: 1:07:20
- Labels: SteepleChase; SCS 1098
- Producer: Nils Winther

Witchdoctor's Son is an album by bassist and pianist Johnny Dyani. It was recorded on March 15, 1978, and was released on LP later that year by SteepleChase Records. On the album, Dyani is joined by saxophonists John Tchicai and Dudu Pukwana, guitarist Alfredo Do Nascimento, and percussionists Mohamed Al-Jabry and Luez "Chumi" Carlos De Sequarira. In 1987, the album was reissued on CD with four extra tracks.

== Reception ==
Professional ratings
Review scores
Source	Rating
AllMusic	4/5 stars
The Penguin Guide to Jazz	3.5/4 stars
The Virgin Encyclopedia of Jazz	4/5 stars
DownBeat	4/5 stars

In a review for AllMusic, Brian Olewnick wrote: "The pieces reflect Dyani's upbringing in the township style prevalent in South Africa, a joyous, surging music which seeks to transcend the horror of everyday life as experienced by the native majority... Dyani would die far too early in 1986, but his warmth and utter musicality happily found expression in several small group recordings made in the prior ten years, of which Witchdoctor's Son is a sterling example. Highly recommended."

The authors of The Penguin Guide to Jazz Recordings noted that the album "comes from Dyani's most consistently inventive period," and stated: "the music is strongly politicized but never programmatic."

Musician and writer Sandy Brown called the album "a recording brim full of beauty and excitement," and commented: "Tchicai's investigative tenor was right up alongside Pukwana's righteous alto; both reeds played 'free' yet were diligently responsive to Johnny Dyani's material and the melodic bell-like drama of his bass." He concluded: "Witchdoctor's Son is the real thing."

Peter Margasak of the Chicago Reader noted that "the entire record is superb," and singled out "Magwaza" for praise, stating that the musicians "prod, collide, and caress each other's lines in one of the most sublimely locked-in, empathetic, and utterly gorgeous passages I've ever heard... I don't think I’ll ever tire of it." On a similar note, a reviewer for London Jazz News described "Magwaza" as "a tune that becomes as much lament as celebration," and remarked: "it's the conflicted emotion, almost overpowering the musical invention but never quite turning into unadorned screaming, that supercharges this one."

== Track listing ==
1. "Heart With Minor's Face" (Johnny Dyani) – 4:17
2. "Ntyilo Ntyilo (The Love Bird)" (Traditional, arranged by Johnny Dyani) – 5:13
3. "Radebe" (Dudu Pukwana) – 6:23
4. "Mbiza" (Johnny Dyani) – 4:45
5. "Eyomzi" (Johnny Dyani) – 6:56
6. "Magwaza" (Traditional, arranged by Johnny Dyani) – 13:05
7. "Radebe, take 1" (Dudu Pukwana) – 8:04 (bonus track on CD)
8. "Heart With Minor's Face, take 2" (Johnny Dyani) – 4:22 (bonus track on CD)
9. "Ntyilo Ntyilo, take 1" (Traditional, arranged by Johnny Dyani) – 3:55 (bonus track on CD)
10. "Magwaza, take 1" (Traditional, arranged by Johnny Dyani) – 10:03 (bonus track on CD)

== Personnel ==
- Johnny Dyani – bass, piano, vocals
- John Tchicai – alto saxophone, soprano saxophone
- Dudu Pukwana – alto saxophone, tenor saxophone
- Alfredo Do Nascimento – guitar
- Luez "Chumi" Carlos De Sequarira – drums
- Mohamed Al-Jabry – percussion
