= Blue Notes for Mongezi =

Studio album by The Blue Notes
- Released: 1976
- Recorded: December 23, 1975
- Studio: A rehearsal room in London
- Genre: Free jazz
- Label: Ogun; OGD 001/002; OGCD 025-026
- Producer: Chris McGregor, Keith Beal

The Blue Notes chronology
Blue Notes for Mongezi (1976)	Blue Notes in Concert Volume 1 (1978)

Blue Notes for Mongezi is an album by The Blue Notes, featuring saxophonist Dudu Pukwana, pianist Chris McGregor, bassist Johnny Dyani, and drummer Louis Moholo. It was recorded on December 23, 1975, in a rehearsal room in London, and was released on vinyl as a double album in 1976 by Ogun Records. In 2022, Ogun reissued the album in expanded form as a double-CD set, using tracks that originally appeared on the 2008 compilation The Ogun Collection.

The album is dedicated to the memory of trumpeter, Blue Notes member, and "brother in music" Mongezi Feza, who died at age 30 on December 14, 1975, roughly a week prior to the recording session. In his liner notes, Keith Beal described the recording as "the spontaneous tribute of four musicians who had assembled in London for the memorial service to their friend," (the members of the group had scattered in the late 1960s) and wrote: "No discussion took place beforehand and nothing was said during the session, save through the music."

== Reception ==
Professional ratings
Review scores
Source	Rating
AllMusic	4.5/5 stars
The Virgin Encyclopedia of Jazz	3/5 stars

In a review for All About Jazz, Chris May stated that the music "transcends the recording's technical limitations and is profoundly moving." He commented: "A true Afrikan wake, an act of collective catharsis, Blue Notes for Mongezi is not an easy listen. But it will reward the close attention of those who loved the Blue Notes and their music."

South African writer A.K. Thembeka, author of the novel Laduma, wrote: "This is a musical document which grinds out the sorrow and incomprehension at the death of a young loved one so uncompromisingly one is left convinced that these men will love each other and play together in the better world that they have all gone to so painfully early."

Jazz Journal's Barry Witherden remarked: "this session shows this tightly knit group at its best, portraying its work perhaps more comprehensively, passionately and authentically than any of their other recordings."

In a JazzTimes tribute to Feza, cornetist Taylor Ho Bynum called the album "an incredibly powerful and heartfelt musical farewell to a fallen brother."

Bill Shoemaker of Point of Departure described the album as the group's "Guernica, a panoramic depiction of their world torn asunder," stating that it "stormed far beyond the parameters of eulogy and Westernized ideals of ritual," with the musicians "veer[ing] between chants and grooves, kwela and free jazz, and spirit-summoning rubato crescendos and existential screams."

JazzWord's Ken Waxman wrote: "the four go through the equivalent of stream-of-consciousness playing, moving from theme to theme, melody to melody and phrase to phrase. Into the mix they toss everything from suggestions of Church of England hymns, kwela dance rhythms, refined, Ellington-reflecting tone poems – heavy on piano chording – and out-and-out primitivist R&B."

Writing for Itineraries of a Hummingbird, Jason Weiss commented: "Totally spontaneous, the musicians just played, washing through them entire lifetimes of music and emotion. Often singing or chanting, fiercely melodic, even a little raw, their tunes take on the aspect of praise songs."

In an article for London Jazz News, Jon Turney noted that the album is "both celebration and lament, ringing with shouts of pain and cries of resistance. Impossible to hear it without thinking of the political horrors the group had left behind, or marvelling at their ability to sound exultant in spite of everything."

== Track listings ==
=== Original LP ===
Disc 1

1. "Blue Notes for Mongezi: First Movement" – 22:35
2. "Blue Notes for Mongezi: Second Movement" – 19:50

Disc 2

1. "Blue Notes for Mongezi: Third Movement" – 19:20
2. "Blue Notes for Mongezi: Fourth Movement" – 23:30

=== CD reissue ===
Disc 1

1. "Blue Notes for Mongezi: First Movement" – 42:14
2. "Blue Notes for Mongezi: Second Movement" – 36:31

Disc 2

1. "Blue Notes for Mongezi: Third Movement" – 41:07
2. "Blue Notes for Mongezi: Fourth Movement" – 37:11

== Personnel ==
- Dudu Pukwana – alto saxophone, whistle, percussion, vocals
- Chris McGregor – piano, percussion
- Johnny Dyani – bass, bells, vocals
- Louis Moholo – drums, percussion, vocals
