= Very Urgent =

1968 jazz album by Chris McGregor Group

Studio album by The Chris McGregor Group
- Released: 1968
- Studio: Sound Techniques, London
- Genre: Free jazz
- Length: 47:36
- Label: Polydor; 184 137
- Producer: Joe Boyd

Chris McGregor chronology
Jazz: The African Sound (1963)	Very Urgent (1968)	Piano Song Vol. 1 (1977)

Very Urgent is an album by the Chris McGregor Group, led by pianist McGregor, and featuring saxophonists Ronnie Beer and Dudu Pukwana, trumpeter Mongezi Feza, bassist Johnny Dyani, and drummer Louis Moholo. It was recorded at Sound Techniques in London, and was released on LP by Polydor Records in 1968. In 2008, the album was reissued on CD by Fledg'ling Records. With the exception of Beer, all of the musicians were members of The Blue Notes, and the album can be viewed as the group's debut studio recording.

== Reception ==
Professional ratings
Review scores
Source	Rating
The Guardian	4/5 stars
Tom Hull – on the Web	B+
The Jazz Mann	4/5 stars
The Virgin Encyclopedia of Jazz	4/5 stars

In a review for The Guardian, John Fordham wrote: "In its unrelenting collective intensity, this set might surprise a few John Zorn admirers in being this far out, this far back... This was a world-class free-band, and it's great to have the evidence back."

Andrey Henkin of All About Jazz stated: "By the time of this album, McGregor had begun to solidify a musical concept that combined celebratory South African music with burgeoning modern jazz. This album... is an extension of the Blue Notes but with greater absorption of modernist touches and the flowerings of each musician's unique voice." AAJ's Clifford Allen commented: "The rhythmic approach is why this music, as much as it offers alms to American free jazz, will never sound Americanized... As much as the music of Chris McGregor and his cohorts are township bop and in the tradition, they equally upend it in ways we're still dealing with."

Writing for The Jazz Mann, Tim Owen called the music "exciting stuff," and remarked: "McGregor's style somehow parallels both Cecil Taylor's fleet, explosive attack and Monk's probing angularity, and the group sound is rooted in these foundations. Moholo drives everything along in a bustling, polyrhythmic style that has something of the same bristling intensity as Tony Oxley."

Ethnomusicologist Carol Ann Muller noted that "the energy of the music conveys an urgent drive," and wrote: "one has the clear sense that these musicians are completely in tune with each other; they listen, respond to, and put the sounds together in the moment and without inhibition." She commented: "it is clear from the recording that the South African political situation had indeed become 'very urgent' and that extreme measure of the Blue Notes emotional outbursts of freedom were necessary steps in breaking the chains of the past to enable all South Africans to begin to imagine the possibilities of a more just social and political order."

In an article for Point of Departure, Bill Shoemaker described the album as "sprawling and edgy," and "something of a retrospective of McGregor's London years, a both/and approach to mingling African and American materials." He stated that "McGregor had something of Ellington's knack of knowing when to lay out and when to make a lightning-quick interjection to jolt horn solos, albeit using a vocabulary closer to that which [Cecil] Taylor introduced in the mid-1950s."

== Track listing ==
1. "Marie My Dear" (Dudu Pukwana) / "Travelling Somewhere" (Chris McGregor) – 16:40
2. "Heart's Vibrations" (Chris McGregor) – 7:03
3. "The Sound's Begin Again" (Chris McGregor) / "White Lies" (Chris McGregor) – 8:15
4. "Don't Stir the Beehive" (Traditional) – 15:05

== Personnel ==
- Chris McGregor – piano
- Dudu Pukwana – alto saxophone
- Ronnie Beer – tenor saxophone
- Mongezi Feza – pocket trumpet
- Johnny Dyani – bass
- Louis Moholo – drums
