= Johnny Dyani =

South African jazz musician (1945–1986)

- Born: Johnny Mbizo Dyani; 30 November 1945
- Origin: East London, South Africa
- Died: 24 October 1986 (aged 40)
- Genre: Jazz
- Occupation: Bassist
- Instrument: Double bass
- Years active: c.1960–1986
- Labels: Ogun, SteepleChase

Johnny Mbizo Dyani (30 November 1945 – 24 October 1986) was a South African jazz double bassist, vocalist and pianist, who, in addition to being a key member of The Blue Notes, played with such international musicians as Don Cherry, Steve Lacy, David Murray, Finnish guitar player Jukka Syrenius, Pierre Dørge, Peter Brötzmann, Mal Waldron, fellow South African Dollar Brand (Abdullah Ibrahim), and Leo Smith, among many other prominent players.

== Biography ==
Dyani was born (3 years before the establishment of Apartheid) and grew up in Duncan Village, East London, in the Buffalo City Metropolitan Municipality, eastern Cape Province of South Africa.

In the early 1960s, he was a member of South Africa's first integrated jazz band, The Blue Notes, with Mongezi Feza on trumpet, Dudu Pukwana on alto saxophone, Nikele Moyake on tenor saxophone, Chris McGregor on piano, and Louis Moholo on drums. In 1964, the band fled South Africa to seek musical and political freedom. Moholo explained, "We were rebels and we were trying to run away from this apartheid thing. We rebelled against the apartheid regime that whites and blacks couldn't play together. We stood up."

In 1966, Dyani toured Argentina with Steve Lacy's quartet. Lacy, Rava, Dyani and Moholo recorded The Forest and the Zoo.

In 1971, Dyani formed his own group Earthquake Power, and in 1972 co-founded Xaba with fellow Blue Note member Mongezi Feza and Turkish percussionist Okay Temiz.

Performing widely throughout Europe, Dyani moved to Copenhagen, Denmark, in the early 1970s, to live with his wife, and about ten years later to Sweden, recording many albums under his own name. He recorded with Dollar Brand (Abdullah Ibrahim), Don Cherry, Steve Lacy, David Murray, Joseph Jarman, Clifford Jarvis, Don Moye, Han Bennink, Brotherhood of Breath, Mal Waldron, Pierre Dørge and many others.

Dyani died suddenly in 1986 after a performance in West Berlin.

== Legacy ==
After his death, the remaining members of The Blue Notes reunited to record a moving tribute album, entitled Blue Notes for Johnny. Other musical tributes include:

- Peter Brötzmann's album Fuck de Boere (1970), dedicated to Johnny Dyani
- Pierre Dørge & New Jungle Orchestra's album Johnny Lives (1987)
- David Murray's composition "Mbizo", which was first recorded on the Clarinet Summit's Southern Bells (1987) and the duo album The Healers with Randy Weston (1987) and giving the title to the World Saxophone Quartet's record M'Bizo (1997).

In a memorial published in the South African magazine Rixaka, Pallo Jordan wrote of Dyani: "Above all, his music resounded with a joy in life."

Johnny Dyani, wrote a song for Gerald Vuyisile Mei, in 1983 about their encounter, where GV Mei as an anthropological researcher shared his findings on oral tradition, he titled the song, 'Bongo', meaning, 'Proud'

== Discography ==
- 1964: The Blue Notes – Township Bop (Proper, released in 2002)
- 1964: The Blue Notes – Legacy: Live in South Afrika 1964 (Ogun, released in 1995)
- 1967: Steve Lacy – The Forest and the Zoo (ESP)
- 1968: Chris McGregor Group - Very Urgent (Polydor)
- 1970: Alan Shorter – Tes Esat (America)
- 1971: Don Cherry – Orient (BYG)
- 1972: Rejoice (Cadillac, 1988) with Mongezi Feza and Okay Temiz
- 1973: Good News from Africa with Abdullah Ibrahim
- 1973: Music For Xaba with Mongezi Feza and Okay Temiz
- 1975: Blue Notes for Mongezi with Chris McGregor, Dudu Pukwana, Louis Moholo
- 1976: Haazz & Co – Unlawful Noise with C. Hazevoet, P. Brotzmann, H. Bennink, L. Moholo, P. Bennink
- 1976: Johnny Dyani with Chris Joris – Songs For Mbizo (released VKH Tonesetters, 1991 [incl. Dyani's voice] and Jazz Halo/Omnitone, 2002)
- 1977: Abdullah Ibrahim – The Journey (Chiaroscuro)
- 1977: Blue Notes in Concert Volume 1 (Ogun, 1978)
- 1978: Johnny Dyani with John Tchicai & Dudu Pukwana – Witchdoctor's Son (SteepleChase)
- 1978: Johnny Dyani Quartet – Song for Biko (SteepleChase)
- 1978: David Murray – Let the Music Take You (Marge)
- 1978: David Murray – Last of the Hipman (Red)
- 1978: African Bass: Solo Concert, Willisau Jazz Festival 1978 (Sing A Song Fighter, 2018)
- 1979: Abdullah Ibrahim/Johnny Dyani – Echoes from Africa (Enja)
- 1979: Spiritual Knowledge and Grace (Ogun, 2011); with Louis Moholo-Moholo, Dudu Pukwana, and Frank Wright
- 1979: The Blue Notes – Before the Wind Changes (Ogun, 2012)
- 1980: Joseph Jarman, Famoudou Don Moye feat. Johnny Dyani – Black Paladins
- 1981: Johnny Dyani & Mal Waldron Duo Live at Jazz Unité – Some Jive Ass Boer (Jazz Unité)
- 1983: Johnny Dyani & Joe Bonner – Suburban Fantasies (SteepleChase)
- 1983: Live at Umea Jazz Festival Anders Gahnold Trio with Gilbert Mathews
- 1984: Pierre Dørge & New Jungle Orchestra– Brikama (SteepleChase)
- 1984: Percussion Summit (Moers Music)
- 1984: Johnny Dyani – Afrika (SteepleChase)
- 1985: Pierre Dørge & New Jungle Orchestra – Even the Moon Is Dancing (SteepleChase)
- 1985: Live at Jazzclub Fasching – Anders Gahnold Trio with Gilbert Mathews
- 1985: Johnny Dyani Quartet – Angolian Cry (SteepleChase); with Harry Beckett, John Tchicai, and Billy Hart
- 1987: Johnny Dyani – Witchdoctor's Son – Together (Cadillac Music & Publishing)
- 1990: Detail – In Time Was – Frode Gjerstad, John Stevens, Kent Carter
- 1993: Three Khan Jamal, Pierre Dorge
- 1996: Born Under The Heat (Dragon Records)
- 2008: The Blue Notes – The Ogun Collection (Ogun); compilation
- 2014: Rejoice & Together (Cadillac); compilation
