= Chris McGregor =

South African jazz pianist, bandleader and composer

Christopher McGregor (24 December 1936 – 26 May 1990) was a South African jazz pianist, bandleader and composer born in Somerset West, South Africa.

== Early influences ==
McGregor grew up in the then Transkei (now part of the Eastern Cape Province), where his father was headmaster at a Church of Scotland mission institution called Blythswood. Here McGregor was exposed to the music of the local amaXhosa people.

This music, as explained in Dave Dargie's book Xhosa Music, is complex. Dargie mentions the following as examples of this complexity which might be seen to have influenced McGregor in his own music, both as composer/arranger and as band leader: "...a great number of style characteristics are to be found: relating not only to harmony and scale, but to melody, structure and phrasing, form, rhythm, instrumentation, singing techniques, and so on."

In his book Chasing the Vibration Graham Lock quotes McGregor saying: "I have this strong imaginative reference to African village music, and the thing I know about that music is that it has a strong centre. It builds up, a lot of people do things together that they know."

== Early career ==
After school and a stint in the merchant navy training academy The General Botha at Gordon's Bay in the Western Cape in 1952–53, McGregor enrolled at the South African College of Music, then headed by Professor Eric Chisholm. Here McGregor was exposed to a different set of influences, during the day Béla Bartók and Arnold Schoenberg, and at night recordings of Duke Ellington and Thelonious Monk, and the live music of local jazz musicians such as Dollar Brand (now Abdullah Ibrahim), Cecil Barnard (now Hotep Idris Galeta), Christopher Columbus Ngcukana, Vincent Kolbe, "Cup-and-Saucers" Nkanuka, Monty Weber, the Schilder brothers, and many others who were active in the vibrant Cape jazz scene at that time, the mid-1950s. The vibrancy and power of this music has led some to designate the music played around Cape Town as a particular jazz genre called "Cape Jazz." (Miller, 2007).

While at the SA College of Music, McGregor studied composition with Stanley Glasser, who later wrote the music for Mr Paljas – a musical that played at the Labia Theatre in Cape Town around 1962 – Chris McGregor was band leader and pianist in the theatre band, which consisted of Dudu Pukwana and Nick Peterson on alto saxes, Cornelius Kumalo on baritone sax and clarinet, Denis Mpali on trumpet, Blyth Mbityana on trombone, Joe Mal on bass, and Columbus Joya on drums. An LP of the show, Mr Paljas, was released by Gallotone Records (GALP 1207).

As McGregor's friend and fellow-student Bruce Arnott wrote in the University of Cape Town's alumni magazine after McGregor's death in 1990: "I am no musicologist, but I believe that Chris was working toward a synthesis of South African black traditional music and the wonderfully evolved black American contribution to jazz." McGregor put together a group to perform at the 1962 Moroka-Jabavu jazz festival in the Johannesburg suburb of Soweto. This group consisted of Mzimkulu "Danayi" Dlova on alto, Chris Ngcukana on baritone, Ronnie Beer on tenor, Willie Netie on trombone, Sammy Maritz on bass and Monty Weber on drums. At the festival, in which the group took second prize, McGregor came into contact with a wider group of musicians such as Dennis Mpali, the legendary altoist Kippie "Morolong" Moeketsi, Churchill Jolobe and the various artists then organised under the banner of the Union of South African Artists, which had put on the famous "jazz opera" King Kong.

These contacts led in the following year to the formation first of the Blue Notes and, secondly, of a big band called the Castle Lager Big Band. The Blue Notes at this stage consisted of Mongezi Velelo (and later Sammy Maritz) on bass, Early Mabuza on drums, Dudu Pukwana on alto and Nikele Moyake on tenor. The young trumpet player Mongezi Feza joined the group soon after. Johnny Dyani replaced Sammy Maritz on bass and Louis Moholo replaced Early Mabuza, soon after and the permanent Blue Notes group was complete.

The Castle Lager Big Band was formed after the 1963 Moroka-Jabavu Jazz Festival. This 17-piece group made the album Jazz: The African Sound, which had six tracks, two compositions by Abdullah Ibrahim, two by Kippie Moeketsi and two by McGregor, all in arrangements by McGregor. Apart from the arrangements, one of the most striking things about the album was the playing by Moeketsi on clarinet, instead of his usual alto. In the band were musicians who had yet to make names for themselves but would become internationally known. Most notable perhaps was Barney Rachabane, who would go on to, among other achievements, play with Paul Simon on the Graceland tour. Simon would describe Rachabane as the "most soulful sax player in the world".

== Years in exile ==
McGregor is perhaps best known for his foundation and leadership of The Blue Notes, the South African sextet. Equally as notable was McGregor's creation of the Brotherhood of Breath in 1969, which branched out from his work as The Blue Notes. The Brotherhood was a larger group than the Blue Notes, and incorporated leading English improvisors. They made several recordings throughout the 1970s, both studio sessions and live, as well as a final studio session in 1988. McGregor also released three albums of solo piano performances, and continued to be a major force in the music after leaving England to live in the French countryside. He also made a contribution to Nick Drake's Bryter Layter album by performing a piano solo on the track "Poor Boy".

== Death ==
McGregor died of lung cancer in May 1990, at the age of 53.

== Discography ==
As leader

- Jazz: The African Sound (New Sound, 1963)
- Very Urgent (Polydor, 1968; Fledg'ling, 2008) with the Chris McGregor Group
- Up to Earth (Fledg'ling, 1969 [2008]) with the Chris McGregor Septet
- Our Prayer (Fledg'ling Records, 1969 [2008]) trio
- Piano Song Vol. 1 (Musica Records, 1977) solo piano
- Piano Song Vol. 2 (Musica Records, 1977) solo piano
- In His Good Time (Ogun, 1977 [1979]) live; solo piano
- Thunderbolt (Popular African Music, 1986 [1997]) live; with the South African Exiles
- Sea Breezes (Fledg'ling, 1987 [2012]) live; solo piano
- Grandmothers Teaching (ITM, 1988) with Marilyn Mazur and Harry Beckett

With The Blue Notes

- Legacy: Live in South Afrika 1964 (Ogun, 1964 [1995])
- Township Bop (Proper, 1964 [2002])
- Blue Notes for Mongezi (Ogun, 1975 [1976])
- Blue Notes in Concert Volume 1 (Ogun, 1977 [1978])
- Before the Wind Changes (Ogun, 1979 [2012])
- Blue Notes for Johnny (Ogun, 1987)
- The Ogun Collection (Ogun, 1964–1987 [2008]) compilation

With Brotherhood of Breath

- Chris McGregor's Brotherhood of Breath (RCA, 1971)
- Eclipse at Dawn (Cuneiform Records, 1971 [2008]) live
- Brotherhood (RCA Victor, 1971)
- Bremen to Bridgwater (Cuneiform Recs, 1971 and 1975 [2004]) live
- Travelling Somewhere (Cuneiform Recs, 1973 [2001]) live
- Live at Willisau (Ogun, 1973 [1974]) live
- Procession (Ogun, 1977 [1978]) live
- Yes Please (In and Out, 1981) live
- Country Cooking (Virgin, 1988)
- En Concert a Banlieues Bleues (52e Rue Est, 1989) live
- In Memoriam (Vital Music, 1994) live; also released as The Memorial Concert (ITM, 1994) - posthomus

With Harry Miller

- Different Times, Different Places (Ogun, 1973–1976 [2013])
