= Dudu Pukwana =

South African saxophonist and composer (1938–1990)

Background information
- Born: Mthutuzeli Dudu Pukwana; 18 July 1938; Walmer Township, Port Elizabeth, South Africa
- Died: 30 June 1990 (aged 51) London, England
- Genres: Jazz, kwela
- Occupations: Musician, composer
- Instruments: Alto saxophone, tenor saxophone, soprano saxophone, piano
- Years active: 1970s – 1990
- Labels: 77 Records, Vertigo, Virgin, Caroline, Affinity, ICP

File:Angel Nemali Sample
An audio sample of "File:Angel Nemali" (from In the Townships, 1973)

Mthutuzeli Dudu Pukwana (18 July 1938 – 30 June 1990) was a South African saxophonist and composer. He was a member of the pioneering jazz sextet The Blue Notes, which moved to Europe in 1964, eventually settling in London, where Pukwana subsequently joined Chris McGregor's big band Brotherhood of Breath.

== Early years in South Africa ==
Dudu Pukwana was born in Walmer Township, Port Elizabeth, South Africa. He grew up studying piano in his family, but in 1956 he switched to alto saxophone after meeting tenor saxophone player Nikele Moyake. In 1962, Pukwana won first prize at the Johannesburg Jazz Festival with Moyake's Jazz Giants (1962, Gallo/Teal). In his early days, he also played with Kippie Moeketsi. Chris McGregor then invited him to join the pioneering Blue Notes sextet, where he played along with Mongezi Feza, Nikele Moyake, Johnny Dyani and Louis Moholo. Although the Blue Notes are often considered McGregor's group, Pukwana was initially the principal composer and all the group members had pivotal roles.

== Emigration to Europe ==
As mixed-race groups were illegal under apartheid, the Blue Notes, increasingly harassed by authorities, emigrated to Europe in 1964, playing in France and Zürich, and eventually settling in London. After the Blue Notes split in the late 1960s, Pukwana joined McGregor's Brotherhood of Breath big band, which again featured his soloing heavily. As a composer, Pukwana wrote "Mra", one of the best-loved tunes by the Brotherhood.

In February 1967, Pukwana received his first mention in America's DownBeat magazine: "Tenorist Ronnie Scott’s "Old Place", having a hard time breaking even, scored a financial success with the Bob Stuckey Trio, featuring the leader's organ and altoist Dudu Pukwana". The trio later expanded to a quartet when Phil Lee joined on guitar, and this group performed twice on BBC's Jazz Club. As a quartet, the band also had a regular session at the Witches Cauldron in Belsize Park. The band completed a series of UK dates throughout 1967, including regular appearances at Ronnie Scott's Jazz Club.

== Assagai, Spear and Zila, etc. ==
He also went on to form two groups with Feza and Moholo. The first was Assagai, an Afro rock band that recorded for the Vertigo label. The second was Spear, with whom he recorded the seminal afro-jazz album In the Townships in 1973 for Virgin Records at The Manor Studio. Assagai and Spear, which recorded a few albums in the early 1970s, blended kwela rhythms, rocking guitars, and jazz solos.

Pukwana played on Matata's Independence album that was released in 1974.

Pukwana's playing was heard in many diverse settings including recordings of Mike Heron, Centipede and Toots and the Maytals (Reggae Got Soul) as well as improvising with Misha Mengelberg and Han Bennink (Yi Yo Le, ICP 1978). With Mongezi Feza, Elton Dean, Keith Tippett, and Louis Moholo, Pukwana recorded two acoustic tracks on the mostly electric album Diamond Express (Freedom 1977). The death of his friend Mongezi Feza in 1975 also inspired the heart-rending Blue Notes for Mongezi (Ogun Records), alongside Blue Notes colleagues Johnny Dyani, Chris McGregor and Louis Moholo. He also guested on albums with his former Blue Notes colleague, Johnny Dyani, particularly Witchdoctor's Son (1978, SteepleChase Records), which features some of his best recorded work, and played extensively with the drummer John Stevens. Several African leaders invited him into their groups, including Hugh Masekela (Home Is Where the Music Is, 1972) and trombonist Jonas Gwangwa (African Explosion, Who, Ngubani 1969).

== Zila and the later years ==
In 1978, Pukwana founded Jika Records and formed his own band, Zila, featuring South Africans Lucky Ranku on guitar and powerful vocalist Miss Pinise Saul. Zila recorded Zila Sounds (1981), Live in Bracknell and Willisau (1983), partly recorded at the Bracknell Jazz Festival, and Zila (1986), the last with keyboardist Django Bates and Pukwana increasingly using soprano sax. In duo with John Stevens, he recorded the free session Radebe:They Shoot to Kill (Affinity, 1987), dedicated to Johnny Dyani.

On 16 April 1990, Pukwana took part in the Nelson Mandela Tribute held at Wembley Stadium. He died in London of liver failure, aged 51, on 30 June 1990, not long after the death of his long-time friend and colleague McGregor.

== Discography ==
=== As leader or co-leader ===
- Kwela (77 Records, 1967), with Gwigwi's Band; reissued as Mbaqanga Songs (Honest Jon's, 2006)
- Night Time Is the Right Time - 60s Soho Sounds (Cadillac, 1967 [2010])
- Dudu Phukwana and the "Spears" (Quality, 1969; Matsuli, 2020)
- In the Townships (Caroline, 1973 [1974])
- Flute Music (Caroline, 1975)
- Diamond Express (Arista/Freedom, 1975 [1977]), released by Jazz Colours as Ubagile
- Black Horse (1201 Music, 1975 [2012])
- Yi Yole (ICP, 1978 [1979])
- Spiritual Knowledge and Grace (Ogun, 1979 [2011])
- Sounds Zila (Jika, 1981)
- Live in Bracknell & Willisau (Jika, 1983), with Pinise Saul
- Zila '86 (Jika, 1986)
- Mbizo Radebe (They Shoot to Kill) (Affinity, 1987)
- Cosmics Chapter 90 (Ah Um, 1989 [1990])

=== With Assagai ===
- Assagai (Vertigo, 1971)
- Zimbabwe (Vertigo, 1971)

=== With The Blue Notes ===
- Legacy: Live in South Afrika 1964 (Ogun, 1964 [1995])
- Township Bop (Proper, 1964 [2002])
- Blue Notes for Mongezi (Ogun, 1975 [1976])
- Blue Notes in Concert Volume 1 (Ogun, 1977 [1978])
- Before the Wind Changes (Ogun, 1979 [2012])
- Blue Notes for Johnny (Ogun, 1987)
- The Ogun Collection (Ogun, 1964–1987 [2008]) compilation

=== With Brotherhood of Breath ===
- Chris McGregor's Brotherhood of Breath (RCA Neon, 1971)
- Eclipse at Dawn (Cuneiform Rune, 1971 [2008])
- Bremen to Bridgwater (Cuneiform Rune, 1971/1975 [2004])
- Brotherhood (RCA, 1972)
- Travelling Somewhere (Cuneiform Rune, 1973 [2001])
- Live at Willisau (Ogun, 1973 [1974])
- Procession (Ogun, 1978)

=== With Johnny Dyani ===
- Witchdoctor's Son (SteepleChase, 1978)
- Song for Biko (SteepleChase, 1978 [1979])
- Mbizo (SteepleChase, 1982)
- Witchdoctor's Son: Together (Cadillac, 1987), reissued on Rejoice + Together (Cadillac, 2014)

=== With Chris McGregor ===
- Jazz: The African Sound (New Sound, 1963)
- Very Urgent (Polydor, 1968)
- Up to Earth (Fledg'ling, 1969 [2008])
- Thunderbolt (Popular African Music, 1986 [1997]), with the South African Exiles

=== With Gary Windo ===
- His Master's Bones (Cuneiform, 1996)
- Anglo American (Cuneiform, 2004)

=== Other ===
- Jazz Fantasia with Gideon Nxumalo (Renown, 1962)
- Mr. Paljas with various artists (Gallotone, 1962)
- Who (Ngubani) with Jonas Gwangwa and African Explosion (Jamal, 1969)
- Septober Energy with Centipede (RCA Neon, 1971)
- Smiling Men with Bad Reputations with Mike Heron (Island, 1971)
- Home Is Where the Music Is with Hugh Masekela (Chisa/Blue Thumb, 1972)
- Mammoth Special with Decameron (Mooncrest, 1974)
- Reggae Got Soul with Toots and the Maytals (Island, 1976)
- Thunder into Our Hearts with Jabula (Caroline, 1976)
- Sondela (The Sound of South Africa) with Atté (Claddagh, 1979)
- Six Empty Places with A Tent (Cherry Red, 1981)
- Soundtrack to Cry Freedom by George Fenton and Jonas Gwangwa (MCA, 1987)
