= Kippie Moeketsi =

South African saxophonist and jazz musician (1925–1983)

- Born: Jeremiah Morolong Moeketsi; 27 July 1925; Johannesburg, South Africa
- Died: 27 April 1983 (aged 57)
- Genres: Jazz
- Instrument: Alto saxophone
- Formerly of: Band in Blue; Shantytown Sextet; Harlem Swingsters; The Jazz Epistles

Jeremiah "Kippie" Morolong Moeketsi (27 July 1925 – 27 April 1983) was a South African jazz musician, notable as an alto saxophonist. He is sometimes referred to as "the father of South African jazz" and as "South Africa's Charlie Parker". He played with and influenced some of South Africa's great musicians, including Jonas Gwangwa, Abdullah Ibrahim, Miriam Makeba and Hugh Masekela.

== Biography ==
Born into a musical Johannesburg family, Jeremiah Morolong Moeketsi was the youngest of 11 brothers, and one sister who was a nurse (Mirriam Ntsadi Kathar, née Moeketsi), all but four of whom played an instrument. Growing up in George Goch township was unpleasant for him and he was often truant. According to the Johannesburg official website, "His mother used to go looking for him, shouting: 'kippie-kippie-kippie', as if he were a chicken" — hence his nickname.

At 20 he started playing clarinet, but would soon move on to the saxophone. Influenced by his pianist brother Jacob Moeketsi, Kippie's career began playing in shebeens with his group, known as the Band in Blue. Over the years he played with several bands, including Shantytown Sextet, the Harlem Swingsters and famously the Jazz Epistles that brought fame to him, Abdullah Ibrahim (or Dollar Brand as he was known then), Jonas Gwangwa, and Hugh Masekela. Moeketsi claimed that he taught Ibrahim everything he knew about music. Ibrahim credited Moeketsi with introducing him to the music of his greatest influence, Thelonious Monk.

Often introduced as "Bra Joe from Kilimanjaro" (Abdullah Ibrahim wrote a composition of that title to feature him), Moeketsi joined the cast of Todd Matshikiza's musical King Kong, which would take him to London in 1961. After the Sharpeville massacre of 1960, most of his contemporaries went into exile, but he returned to South Africa. In the oppressive circumstances he would not perform for four years.

After many years of alcohol abuse, Moeketsi died penniless and disgruntled in 1983, aged 58.

== Legacy ==
- The Newtown jazz club Kippies, located at the Market Theatre in Johannesburg, is named after him.
- A bronze sculpture of him, designed by Guy du Toit and Egon Tania, was unveiled on 25 September 2009. At the ceremony, Jonas Gwangwa said of his former mentor: "Bra Kippie was a very, very talented musician ... he became a father of jazz.... He was very challenging. He'd just walk on stage, take out his horn and play."
- Moeketsi is the subject of a 1999 documentary film by Glenn Ujebe Masokoane entitled Blues For Kippie.
