= Mongezi Feza =

South African jazz trumpeter and flautist (1945–1975)

Background information
- Born: 11 May 1945; Queenstown, Cape Province, Union of South Africa
- Died: 14 December 1975 (aged 30) London, England
- Genre: Jazz
- Occupations: Musician, composer
- Instruments: Trumpet and flute
- Years active: 1964–1975
- Formerly of: The Blue Notes; Robert Wyatt; Henry Cow; Johnny Dyani; Chris McGregor; Dudu Pukwana

Mongezi Feza (11 May 1945 – 14 December 1975) was a South African jazz trumpeter and flautist.

== Biography ==
Feza was born in Queenstown, Cape Province, Union of South Africa, into a family of musicians, His elder brother, Sandi Feza, who taught him how to play the trumpet in Mlungisi township in Queenstown.

A member of The Blue Notes, Feza left South Africa in 1964 and settled in Europe, living in London and Copenhagen. As a trumpeter, his influences included hard bopper Clifford Brown and free jazz pioneer Don Cherry. After The Blue Notes splintered in the late 1960s, he played with British rock musician Robert Wyatt, progressive rock band Henry Cow, and most extensively with fellow ex-Blue Notes musicians Johnny Dyani, Chris McGregor and Dudu Pukwana. Feza's compositions "Sonia" and "You Ain't Gonna Know Me ('Cos You Think You Know Me)" remained in the repertoire of his colleagues long after his death. In the early 1970s, Feza was also member of the afro-rock band Assagai.

Feza died in London, in December 1975, from untreated pneumonia. Shortly after his death, the remaining members of The Blue Notes reunited to record a tribute that would be released as Blue Notes for Mongezi (Ogun, 1976).

== Discography ==
As leader or co-leader

- Music For Xaba Vol 1 and Vol 2 (with Johnny Dyani and Okay Temiz), Sonet (1972)
- Rejoice (with Johnny Dyani and Okay Temiz), Cadillac (1988) recorded in 1972
- Free Jam (with the Bernt Rosengren Quartet), Ayler (2004) recorded in 1972

With Assagai

- Assagai, Vertigo (1971)
- Zimbabwe, Vertigo (1971)

With The Blue Notes

- Township Bop, Proper (2002) recorded in 1964
- Legacy: Live in South Afrika 1964, Ogun (1995) recorded in 1964
- The Ogun Collection, Ogun (2008) compilation

With Brotherhood of Breath

- Chris McGregor's Brotherhood of Breath, RCA/Neon (1971) recorded in 1970
- Live at Willisau, Ogun (1974)
- Travelling Somewhere, Cuneiform (2001) recorded in 1973
- Bremen to Bridgwater, Cuneiform (2004) recorded in 1971 and 1975

With Henry Cow and Slapp Happy

- Desperate Straights, Virgin (1975)
- In Praise of Learning, Virgin (1975)

With Chris McGregor

- Very Urgent, Polydor (1968)
- Up to Earth, Fledg'ling (2008) recorded in 1969

With Harry Miller's Isipingo

- Which Way Now, Cuneiform Records (2006) recorded in 1975
- Full Steam Ahead, Reel Recordings (2009) recorded during 1975–1977

With Robert Palmer

- Pressure Drop, Island (1975)

With Dudu Pukwana

- Dudu Phukwana and the "Spears", Quality (1969) reissued by Matsuli Music in 2020
- In the Townships (Dudu Pukwana & Spear), Virgin (1973) dedicated to the memory of Mongezi Feza
- Flute Music (Dudu Pukwana & Spear), Caroline/Virgin (1975)
- Diamond Express (Dudu Pukwana), Freedom (1977)

With Robert Wyatt

- Rock Bottom, Virgin (1974)
- Ruth Is Stranger Than Richard, Virgin (1975)
- Theatre Royal Drury Lane 8th September 1974, Hannibal (2005)

== Bibliography ==
Philippe Carles, André Clergeat, and Jean-Louis Comolli, Dictionnaire du jazz, Paris, 1994
