= Mark Charig =

British trumpeter & cornetist (born 1944)

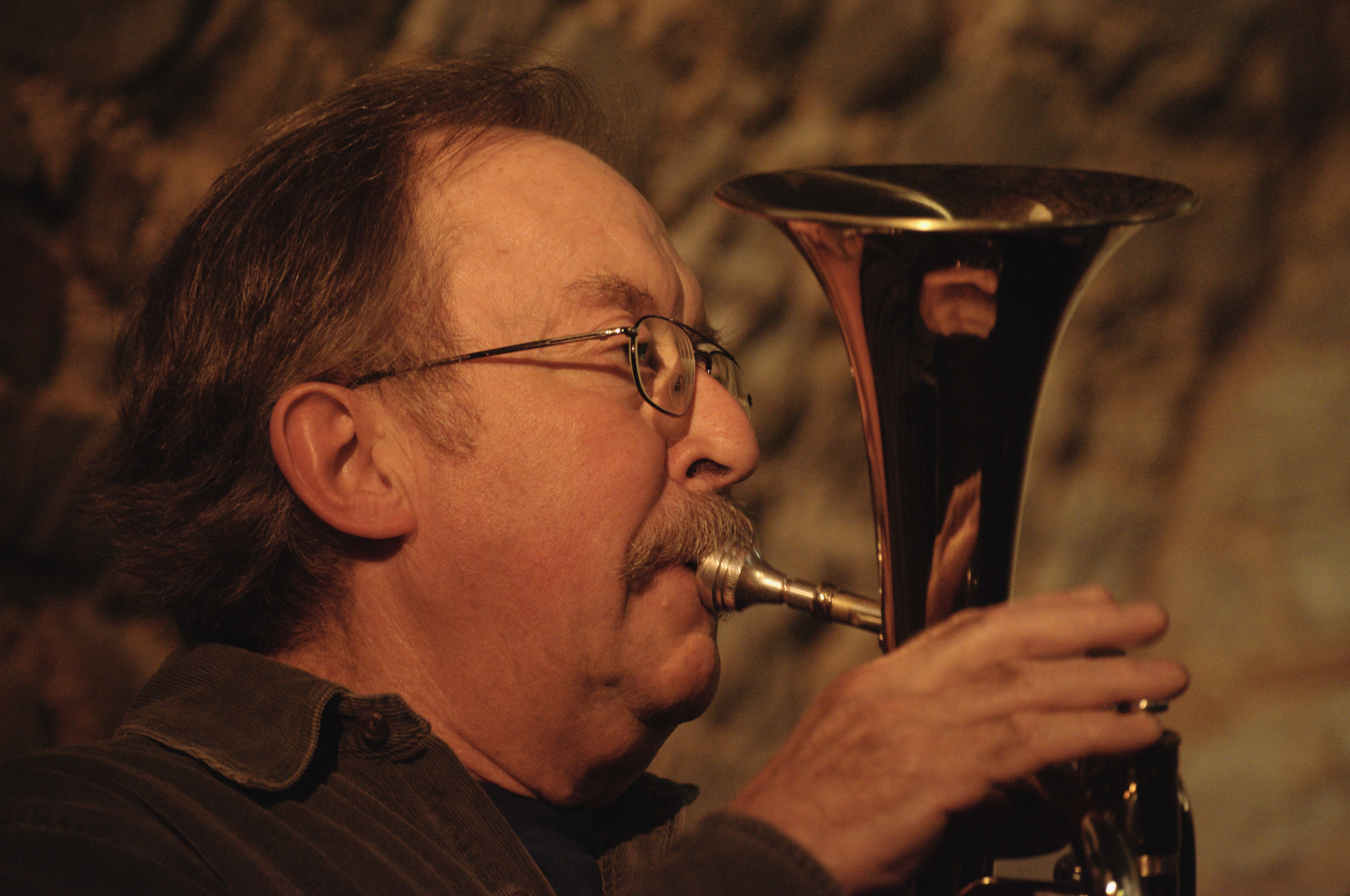

Mark Charig (born 22 February 1944 in London) is a British trumpeter and cornetist.

In the late 1960s, Charig spent two years in Long John Baldry's group, Bluesology. After attending the Barry jazz summer school, he formed a band with Keith Tippett and Nick Evans, after which he and Evans joined the Brotherhood of Breath.

Charig also featured with Tippett's Centipede big band and on several King Crimson albums, being particularly prominent in a long solo on the title track of Islands, on the title track of Lizard and on the track "Fallen Angel" on the Red album, as well as in a work-in-progress version of "Starless".

In the mid-1970s he toured with the group Red Brass, which featured singer Annie Lennox. He also recorded with Mike Osborne, as well as releasing his own Pipedream LP on Ogun Records.

Charig is a member of the London Jazz Composers' Orchestra. He now lives in Germany and is a member of the Wuppertal-based Conduction Orchestra.

More recently, he has recorded KJU: a CD of quartet improvisations with the group "Quatuohr".

== Discography ==
=== As leader ===
- Pipedream with Keith Tippett, Ann Winter, (Ogun, 1977)
- Amore with Taya Fisher, Floros Floridis (J.N.D., 1985)
- Live in Mestre with Radu Malfatti, Evan Parker, Tony Rusconi (WM Boxes, 2011)
- Free Music On a Summer Evening with Jörg Fischer, Georg Wolf (sporeprint, 2014)

=== As sideman ===
With Maarten Altena

- Rif (Claxon, 1987)
- Quotl (hat ART, 1989)
- Cities & Streets (hat ART, 1991)

With Elton Dean

- Elton Dean (CBS, 1971)
- Oh! for the Edge (Ogun, 1976)
- Happy Daze (Ogun, 1977)
- Boundaries (Japo, 1980)
- Live at the BBC (Hux, 2003)
- Ninesense Suite (Jazzwerkstatt, 2011)
- The 100 Club Concert 1979 (Reel, 2012)

With Barry Guy/London Jazz Composers' Orchestra

- Ode (Incus, 1972)
- Zurich Concerts (Intakt, 1988)
- Harmos (Intakt, 1989)
- Double Trouble (Intakt, 1990)
- Theoria (Intakt, 1992)
- Portraits (Intakt, 1994)
- Three Pieces for Orchestra (Intakt, 1997)
- Double Trouble Two (Intakt, 1998)
- Study II/Stringer (Intakt, 2005)

With King Crimson

- Lizard (Island, 1970)
- Islands (Island, 1971)
- Red (Island, 1974)

With Chris McGregor

- Chris McGregor's Brotherhood of Breath (RCA/Neon, 1971)
- Brotherhood (RCA Victor, 1972)
- Live at Willisau (Ogun, 1974)
- Procession (Ogun, 1978)
- Yes Please (In and Out, 1981)
- Travelling Somewhere (Cuneiform, 2001)
- Bremen to Bridgwater (Cuneiform, 2004)
- Eclipse at Dawn (Cuneiform, 2008)

With Harry Miller

- Family Affair (Ogun, 1977)
- Down South (Varajazz, 1984)
- Full Steam Ahead (Reel, 2009)
- Different Times, Different Places (Ogun, 2013)

With Soft Machine

- Fourth (CBS, 1971)
- BBC Radio 1 Live in Concert (Windsong, 1972)
- The Peel Sessions (Strange Fruit, 1990)
- Fourth/Fifth (Columbia, 1999)
- Backwards (Cuneiform, 2002)
- BBC Radio 1967–1971 (Hux, 2003)

With Keith Tippett

- You Are Here...I Am There (Polydor, 1970)
- Dedicated to You, But You Weren't Listening (Vertigo, 1971)
- Frames Music for an Imaginary Film (Ogun, 1978)
- A Loose Kite in a Gentle Wind Floating with Only My Will for an Anchor (Ogun, 1986)
- Live at Le Mans (Red Eye, 2007)

With others

- Graham Bell, Graham Bell (Charisma, 1972)
- Centipede, Septober Energy (RCA/Neon, 1971)
- Bob Downes, Hells Angels (Openian, 1975)
- Julie Driscoll, 1969 (Polydor, 1971)
- Eddy Grant, Eddy Grant (Torpedo, 1975)
- Hugh Hopper, Hopper Tunity Box (Compendium, 1977)
- Reg King, Reg King (United Artists, 1971)
- Didier Levallet, Scoop (In and Out, 1983)
- Mike Osborne, Marcel's Muse (Ogun, 1977)
- Soft Heap, Soft Heap (Charly, 1979)
- Julie Tippetts, Sunset Glow (Utopia, 1975)
- Gary Windo, His Master's Bones (Cuneiform, 1996)
- Gary Windo, Anglo American (Cuneiform, 2004)
- Robert Wyatt, The End of an Ear (CBS, 1970)
