= Harry Beckett =

British jazz musician (1935–2010)

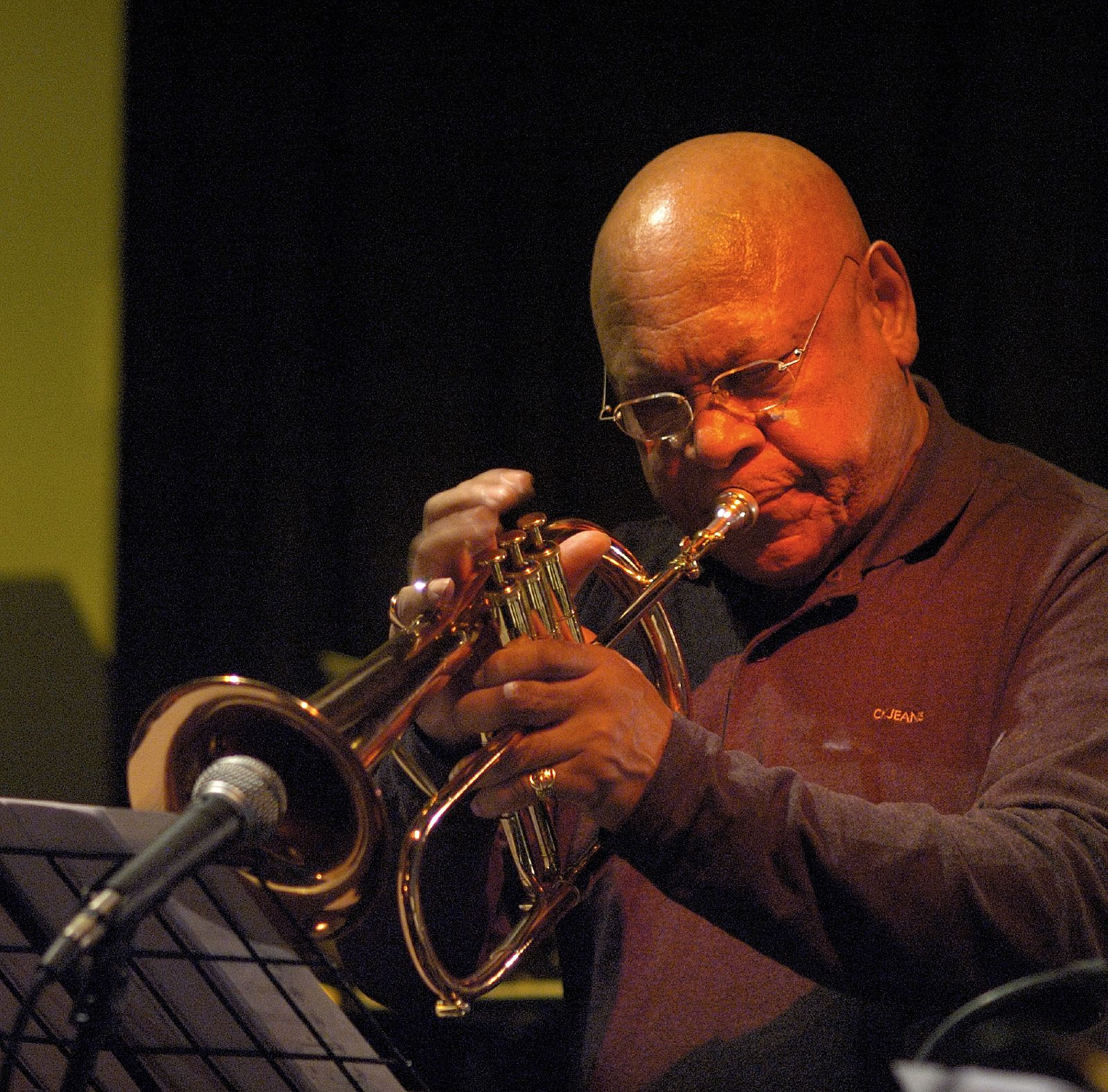
- Beckett in January 2007

Background information
- Born: Harold Winston Beckett; 30 May 1935; Saint Michael, Barbados
- Died: 22 July 2010 (aged 75) London, England
- Occupation: Musician
- Instruments: Trumpet, flugelhorn
- Years active: 1961–2010

Harold Winston Beckett (30 May 1935 – 22 July 2010) was a British trumpeter and flugelhorn player of Barbadian origin.

== Biography ==
Born in Bridgetown, Saint Michael, Barbados, Harry Beckett learned to play music in a Salvation Army band. A resident in the UK from 1954, he had an international reputation. He played with Charles Mingus in the 1962 film All Night Long. In the 1960s, he worked and recorded within the band of bass player and composer Graham Collier, retaining the connection over a 16-year period. Beginning in 1970, Beckett led groups of his own, recording for Philips, RCA and Ogun Records among other labels.

Beckett was a key figure of important groups in the British free jazz/improvised music scene, including Ian Carr's Nucleus, the Brotherhood of Breath and The Dedication Orchestra, London Jazz Composers Orchestra, London Improvisers Orchestra, John Surman's Octet, Django Bates, Ronnie Scott's Quintet, Kathy Stobart, Charlie Watts, Stan Tracey's Big Band and Octet; Elton Dean's Ninesense. He also recorded with Keef Hartley, Jah Wobble, David Sylvian and worked with David Murray. He toured abroad with Johnny Dyani, Chris McGregor, Keith Tippett, John Tchicai, Joachim Kühn, Dudu Pukwana's Zila, George Gruntz's Bands, Belgian quintet The Wrong Object, Pierre Dørge's New Jungle Band and Annie Whitehead's Robert Wyatt project, Soupsongs, which also featured Phil Manzanera and Julie Tippetts, among other jazz and rock luminaries.

Beckett's dub-oriented album, The Modern Sound of Harry Beckett, was produced by famed British producer Adrian Sherwood and released on On-U Sound in late 2008.

In 1972, Beckett won the Melody Maker jazz Poll as "Top Trumpeter in Britain". He was a member of the Orchestre National de Jazz between 1997 and 2000.

Beckett died on 22 July 2010 after suffering a stroke.

== Discography ==
Artist/group	Title	Label	Recording date	Location	Release date
Charles Mingus	Session following filming All Night Long	Private Acetate	01/01/61	London	1962
West African Rhythm Brothers	Various singles	Melodisc	01/01/63	?	1963
Nigerian Union Rhythm Group	?	Melodisc	01/01/66	?	1966
Ambrose Campbell	High Life Today	Columbia Lansdowne	01/01/66	?	1966
The Graham Collier Septet	Deep Dark Blue Centre	Deram	24/01/67	Jackson Studios, Rickmansworth, Hertfordshire	1967
Herbie Goins & The Night-Timers	No.1 In Your Heart	Parlophone	01/07/67	London	1967
Herbie Goins & The Night-Timers	Soultime! (Compilation)	See For Miles			1992
John Surman, Alan Skidmore, Tony Oxley	Jazz In Britain '68–'69	Decca Eclipse	01/03/69	London	1972
Small Faces	Ogdens' Nut Gone Flake	Immediate	01/01/68	London	1968
Graham Collier	Workpoints	Cuneiform	16/03/68	Southampton University, Southampton	2005
John Surman	John Surman (Anglo-Sax in the US)	Deram	14/08/68	London	1969
New Jazz Orchestra	Le Déjeuner Sur L'Herbe	Verve	01/09/68	Pye Studios, Marble Arch, London	1969
Ray Russell Quartet	Dragon Hill	CBS Realm	01/01/69	London	1969
Michelin Commercial Theme			01/01/69		1969
Keef Hartley Band	The Battle of North West Six	Deram	01/01/69	Decca Studios, West Hampstead, London	1969
Various	Wowie Zowie! The World of Progressive Music (includes "Not Foolish, Not Wise" from The Battle Of North West Six)	Decca	01/01/69	Decca Studios, West Hampstead, London	1969
Graham Collier Sextet	Down Another Road	Fontana	21/03/69	London	1969
Joe Harriott	Journey (Extra track: "In a Sentimental Mood" with Stan Tracey Big Band)	Moonlight Tunes	18/04/69	BBC TV Studios, London ?	2011
Jack Bruce	Songs for a Tailor	Polydor	20/05/69	Morgan Studios, London	1969
Manfred Mann Chapter Three	Manfred Mann Chapter Three	Vertigo	01/06/69	Maximum Sound Studios, London SE1	1969
Keef Hartley Band	Halfbreed	Deram	01/06/69	Decca Studios, West Hampstead, London	1969
Alexis Korner	Both Sides	Metronome (Germany)	23/09/69	Olympic Studios, London	1970
Galliard	New Dawn	Deram	13/12/69	London?	1970
Mike Osborne	Outback	Turtle	01/01/70	London	1970
Bob Downes Open Music	Electric City	Vertigo	01/01/70	London	1970
Ray Russell's Rock Workshop	Rock Workshop	CBS	01/01/70	De Lane Lea Studios, Kingsway, London	1970
Manfred Mann Chapter Three	Volume Two	Vertigo	01/01/70	London	1970
John Surman	How Many Clouds Can You See?	Deram	01/03/70	London	1970
Ray Russell's Rock Workshop	The Very Last Time	CBS	04/04/70	De Lane Lea Studios, Kingsway, London	1971
C.C.S.	C.C.S. (First)	RAK	01/05/70	Abbey Road Studios, London	1970
Neil Ardley's New Jazz Orchestra	Camden '70	Dusk Fire	26/05/70	Jeanetta Cochrane Theatre, London WC1	2008
Graham Collier Music	Songs For My Father	Fontana	01/06/70	London	1970
Various, Andrew Lloyd Webber, Tim Rice	Jesus Christ Superstar	MCA	01/06/70	London	1970
Memphis Slim	Blue Memphis	Barclay	01/06/70	?	1970
Colosseum	Daughter of Time	Vertigo	01/07/70	London	1970
Harry Beckett	Flare Up	Philips	15/07/70	London	1970
Ray Russell	Rites And Rituals	CBS	01/08/70	De Lane Lea Studios, Kingsway, London	1971
Keef Hartley Band	Not Foolish Not Wise	Mooncrest Records	01/08/70	BBC Studios, Regent Street, London	1999
The Trio	Conflagration	Dawn	01/11/70	London	1971
Graham Collier Music	The Alternate Mosaics	BGO	12/12/70	The Torrington, North Finchley, London	2008
Graham Collier Music Featuring Harry Beckett	Mosaics	Philips	12/12/70	The Torrington, North Finchley, London	1971
Ian Carr with Nucleus	Solar Plexus	Vertigo	14/12/70	Phonogram Studios, London	1971
Michael Gibbs	Tanglewood '63	Deram	23/12/70	Morgan Studios, London	1971
Harry Beckett	Warm Smiles	RCA Victor/Vocalion	01/01/71	Command Studios, London	1971
Chris McGregor's Brotherhood of Breath	Brotherhood	RCA Neon	01/01/71	London	1971
Miller Anderson	Bright City	Deram	01/01/71	London	1971
Faces	Long Player	Warner Brothers	01/01/71	Morgan Studios, London	1971
Storyteller	More Pages	Transatlantic	01/01/71	Sound Techniques, Chelsea, London	1971
Chris McGregor's Brotherhood of Breath	Chris McGregor's Brotherhood of Breath	RCA Neon	09/01/71	Sound Techniques, Chelsea, London	1971
Neil Ardley & The New Jazz Orchestra	On the Radio: BBC Sessions 1971	Dusk Fire	25/01/71	Camden Theatre, London	2017
John Surman/John Warren	Tales of the Algonquin	Deram	01/04/71	London	1971
Ray Russell	Live at the I.C.A.	RCA Victor	11/06/71	ICA, The Mall, London	1971
The Keef Hartley Band	Little Big Band	Deram	13/06/71	Marquee Club, Wardour Street, London	1971
Oliver Nelson	Swiss Suite	Flying Dutchman	16/06/71	Montreux Jazz Festival	1972
Chris McGregor's Brotherhood of Breath	Bremen to Bridgwater	Cuneiform	20/06/71	Lila Eule, Bremen, Germany (1971) & Bridgwater Arts Centre, Bridgwater, UK (1975)	2004
Neil Ardley	A Symphony of Amaranths	Regal Zonophone	23/06/71	Lansdowne Studios, Holland Park, London	1971
Mike Westbrook Orchestra	Metropolis	RCA Neon	03/08/71	Lansdowne Studios, Holland Park, London	1971
The Running Man	The Running Man	RCA Neon	15/10/71	Trident Studios, London W1	1972
Chris McGregor's Brotherhood Of Breath	Eclipse at Dawn	Cuneiform	04/11/71	Berliner Philharmonie, Berliner Jazztage, Berlin, Germany	2008
Alexis Korner	Bootleg Him!	RAK	01/05/70	Abbey Road Studios, London	1972
Harry Beckett's S & R Powerhouse Sections	Themes for Fega	RCA Victor/Vocalion	04/02/72	ICA, The Mall, London	1972
Coulson, Dean, McGuinness, Flint	Lo & Behold	DJM	01/03/72	Maximumsound, Old Kent Road, London	1972
Barry Guy/London Jazz Composers' Orchestra	Ode	Incus	22/04/72	Oxford Town Hall, Oxford	1972
The Mike Gibbs Band	Just Ahead	Polydor	31/05/72	Ronnie Scott's Club, London	1972
Various (Chris McGregor's Brotherhood of Breath)	International New Jazz Meeting Burg Altena 1972–1973	B. Free	24/06/72	Altena Castle, Germany	2016
Alan Cohen Band	Duke Ellington's Black Brown & Beige	Argo	19/10/72	Decca Studios, West Hampstead, London	1973
London Jazz Composers Orchestra	Ode	Auditorium	22/10/72	Donaueschingen Musiktage 22, Germany	2005
Chris McGregor's Brotherhood of Breath	Live at Willisau	Ogun	27/01/73	Jazz Festival Willisau, Switzerland	1974
C.C.S.	The Best Band in the Land	RAK	01/01/73	Abbey Road Studios, London	1973
Scaffold	Fresh Liver	Island	01/01/73	Air Studios, Hampstead, London NW3	1973
Jaki Whitren	Raw but Tender	Epic	01/01/73	Nova Sound Recording Studios, London	1973
Ray Russell	Secret Asylum	Black Lion	01/01/73	Black Lion Records Studios, London	1973
Chris McGregor's Brotherhood of Breath	Travelling Somewhere	Cuneiform	19/01/73	Lila Eule, Bremen, Germany	2001
Alexis Korner	Alexis Korner	Polydor (Germany)	01/01/73	CBS Recording Studios, London	1974
Giorgio Gaslini	L'Integrale - Antologia Cronologica - CD N°7 (1973), CD N°8 (1973–74)	Soul Note	13/10/73	Studio 7, Milan, Italy	2008
Giorgio Gaslini & Jean-Luc Ponty	Fabbrica Occupata	Produttori Associati	27/10/73	?	1974
Sharon Forrester	Sharon	Ashanti	01/01/74	?	1974
Harry Beckett	Joy Unlimited	Cadillac	12/03/74	Chalk Farm Studios, Camden, London	1975
Graham Collier Music	Darius	Mosaic	13/03/74	Cranfield Institute of Technology, Bedfordshire	1974
Harry Beckett	Still Happy	My Only Desire	11/08/74	BBC Studios, London	2016
Graham Collier with Graham Collier Music	Jazz Illustrations	Cambridge University Press	01/01/75	?	1975
Graham Collier with Graham Collier Music	Jazz Lecture Concert	Cambridge University Press	01/01/75	?	1975
Bob Downes Open Music	Hells Angels	Openian	01/01/75	?	1975
Various (including Graham Collier Music)	Trad Dads, Dirty Boppers and Free Fusioneers	Reel Recordings	01/01/75	?	2012
Eddy Grant	Eddy Grant	Torpedo	01/01/75		1975
Graham Collier Music	Midnight Blue	Mosaic	17/02/75	Nettlebed, Oxfordshire	1975
John Warren Bigband	Live (Sparkasse Bremen, Sparkasse in Concert II / 76)	Sparkasse Bremen	21/06/75	der Aula des Ausbildungszentrums der Oberpostdirektion Bremen	1976
Harry Beckett	Memories of Bacares	Ogun	25/11/75	The Sussex, Culford Road, London N1	1975
Elton Dean's Ninesense	Oh! For The Edge	Ogun	22/03/76	100 Club, London	1976
Graham Collier Music	New Conditions	Mosaic	02/06/76	Nettlebed, Oxfordshire	1976
Graham Collier Music	Symphony of Scorpions	Mosaic	07/11/76	Ronnie Scott's Club, London	1977
Stan Tracey Octet	The Bracknell Connection	Steam	29/11/76	100 Club, London	1976
Chris McGregor's Brotherhood of Breath	Procession	Ogun	10/05/77	Halle aux Grains, Toulouse, France	1978
Harry Beckett's Joy Unlimited	Got It Made	Ogun	13/07/77	London	1977
Elton Dean's Ninesense	Happy Daze	Ogun	26/07/77	Redan Recorders, London W2	1977
Stan Tracey Octet	The Early Works	ReSteamed	17/09/77	St Edmund's Art Centre, Salisbury, UK	2008
The Jive Bureaux	Stick It	Gull	01/01/78	Morgan Studios, London	1978
Alan Price	England My England	Jet	01/01/78	?	1978
Stan Tracey Octet	Salisbury Suite	Steam	25/02/78	The Royal Festival Hall, London	1978
Graham Collier Music	The Day of the Dead	Mosaic	01/03/78	Nettlebed, Oxfordshire	1978
Elton Dean's Ninesense	Live at the BBC	Hux	17/03/78	BBC Studios, London	2003
Kathy Stobart	Arbeia	Spotlite	28/03/78	Konk Studios, London N8	1978
Elton Dean's Ninesense	The 100 Club Concert 1979	Reel Recordings	05/03/79	The 100 Club, 100 Oxford St, London	2012
Barry Guy/London Jazz Composers Orchestra	Stringer	FMP	01/03/80	BBC Maida Vale Studio, London	1983
Dudu Pukwana	Sounds Zila	Jika	16/01/81	100 Club, London	1981
Chris McGregor's Brotherhood Of Breath	Yes Please - Angoulème 1981	In And Out	01/06/81	Théatre Municipal, Angoulème	1981
Elton Dean's Ninesense	Ninesense Suite	Jazzwerkstatt	20/06/81	Jazzwerkstatt Peitz N°41, Germany	2011
Weekend	The View from Her Room (7" single)	Rough Trade	01/01/82	Blackwing Studios, Southward, London SE1	1982
Beckett/Miller/Moholo	Jazzwerkstatt Peitz No. 45	Jazzwerkstatt	24/04/82	Jazzwerkstatt Peitz N°45, Germany	2011
Robert Wyatt	Nothing Can Stop Us	Rough Trade	01/06/82	?	1982
Weekend	La Varieté	Rough Trade	01/07/82	Power Plant Studio, Willesden, London NW1	1982
Trevor Bastow	Sax Trax	JW Music Library	01/01/83	?	1983
David Panton's One Music Orchestra	BBC Radio Three Jazz in Britain broadcast	Private recording	27/06/93	BBC Maida Vale Studio, London	1983
Dudu Pukwana and Zila	Life In Bracknell & Willisau	Jika	03/07/83	Bracknell & Willisau Jazz Festivals	1983
Stan Tracey	Stan Tracey Now	Steam	09/07/83	Lansdowne Studios, Holland Park, London	1983
Albert Van Dam	The Sentimental Touch	RCA	01/01/84	?	1984
Working Week	Storm of Light (7" & 12" singles)	Virgin/Paladin	01/05/84	Power Plant Studio, Willesden, London NW1	1984
David Panton Quintet	Live at Nottingham Jazz	Panton Music	01/11/84	?	1984
David Panton & Associates	Standard Deviation	Panton Music	01/11/84	?	2016
Harry Beckett	Pictures of You	Virgin	01/01/85	Wave Studios, London W1	1985
Jah Wobble & Ollie Marland	Neon Moon	Island	01/01/85	Guerilla Studio UK, Rail Studio Germany and The Fallout Shelter UK	1985
Working Week	Working Nights	Virgin	01/01/85	?	1985
Working Week Featuring Jalal of the Last Poets & Julie Tippetts	Stella Marina (12" single)	Virgin	01/01/85	Power Plant Studio, Willesden, London NW1	1985
Working Week	Pay Check (US Compilation)	Virgin America	1984-1985	London	1988
Elton Dean Quintet	The Bologna Tapes	Ogun	18/04/85	Osteria Delle Dame, Bologna, Italy	1985
Johnny Dyani Quartet	Angolian Cry	Steeplechase	23/07/85	Sound Track Studios, Copenhagen, Denmark	1985
Pierre Dørge & New Jungle Orchestra	Even the Moon Is Dancing	Steeplechase	30/07/85	Easy Sound Studios, Copenhagen, Denmark	1985
Lysis	Superimpositions - IMProvised comPOSITIONS	Soma	01/01/86	?	1986
David Defries	The Secret City	MMC	01/01/86	?	1986
Jah Wobble & Ollie Marland	Tradewinds	Lago	01/01/86	Guerilla Studios, London W9 & Paradiso, Amsterdam	1986
David Sylvian	Gone to Earth	Virgin	01/01/86	London	1986
Dudu Pukwana	Zila 86	Jika	01/01/86	?	1986
Chris McGregor and the South African Exiles	Thunderbolt	PAM	01/01/86	Open Ohr Festival, Mainz, Germany	1986
The Charlie Watts Orchestra	Live at Fulham Town Hall	CBS	23/03/86	Fulham Town Hall, London SW6	1986
Detail Plus – Ness	Ness	Impetus	01/07/86	Mannod Studio/Community Music, London	1986
Elton Dean Quintet	Welcomet Live in Brazil 1986	Impetus (Vinyl) & Ogun (CD)	01/01/87	Radio Cultura de Sao Paulo, Brazil	1987
Pulse!	Stormy Weather	Spotlite	12/07/86	Stoke-on-Trent	1987
Harry Beckett/Johnny Dyani/Chris McGregor/Marilyn Mazur	Grandmothers Teaching	ITM	01/01/87	Woodhouse Studio, Dortmund and Hermes Studio, Kamen, Germany	1988
Chris McGregor's Brotherhood of Breath	Country Cooking	Virgin/Great Winds	01/01/87	Angel Studios, Islington, London N1	1988
Tom Mega	Backyards of Pleasure	ITM	01/01/87	Woodhouse Studio, Dortmund, Germany	1988
Jazz Warriors	Out of Many, One People	Antilles	13/03/87	Shaw Theatre, Kings Cross, London NW1	1987
Pierre Dørge & New Jungle Orchestra	Johnny Lives	Steeplechase	15/04/87	Copenhagen, Denmark	1987
Harry Beckett	Les Jardins du Casino	West Wind	01/05/87	London (1991) & Germany (1987)	1993
Harry Beckett – Courtney Pine	Live, Vol. 2	West Wind	20/05/87	Manufaktur Schorndorf, Germany	1987
Harry Beckett	Bremen Concert	West Wind	23/05/87	Radio Bremen, Weserterrasse, Dacapo	1988
John Stevens' Fast Colour	Suite for Johnny Dyani	Loose Torque	05/08/88	WIM Concert, Antwerp, Belgium	2004
U3 Klang	Jazz Goes Underground	West Wind	28/08/88	Kongreßhalle Berlin, Germany	1988
Pierre Dørge & New Jungle Orchestra	Different Places - Different Bananas	Olufsen	08/01/88	Easy Sound Recording Studio, Copenhagen	1989
Various	Bandes Originales Du Journal De Spirou	Nato	01/01/89	The Chocolate Factory, London	1989
Chris McGregor's Brotherhood of Breath - Archie Shepp	En Concert A Banlieues Bleues	52e Rue Est	18/03/89	Espace John Lennon at La Courneuve, France	1989
Anglo Italian Quartet	Put It Right Mr. Smoothie	Spalsc(h)	12/02/90	Barigozzi Studio, Milan, Italy	1991
Harry Beckett & Pierre Dørge	Echoes Of...	Olufsen	01/05/90	Sun Studio, Copenhagen, Denmark	1990
Pierre Dørge & New Jungle Orchestra	Live in Chicago	Olufsen	06/07/90	Southend Musicworks, Chicago	1991
Jah Wobble's Invaders of the Heart	Rising Above Bedlam	Oval	01/01/91	Greenhouse Studios, London	1991
Vic Reeves	I Will Cure You	Island	01/01/91	?	1991
Pierre Dørge's New Jungle Orchestra Featuring David Murray	The Jazzpar Prize	Enja	16/03/91	Focus Recording, Copenhagen, Denmark	1992
David Murray & Pierre Dorges New Jungle Orchestra (Take 1 of track from The Jazzpar Prize)	Jazzpar – All Winners 1990 – 2004	Jazzkontakten	16/03/91	Focus Recording, Copenhagen, Denmark	2005
Harry Beckett's Flugelhorn 4 + 3	All Four One	Spotlite	25/03/91	Porcupine Studios, Mottingham, London	1991
Joachim Kuhn	Sometime Ago	Newedition	09/04/91	CMP Studio Zerkall	2005
Harry Beckett	Passion and Possession	ITM	23/04/91	Porcupine Studios, London SE9 & CMP Studio, Zerkall, Germany (9 April)	1991
Beckett – Levallet – Marsh	Images of Clarity	Evidence	01/01/92	?	1992
Pierre Dørge & New Jungle Orchestra	Karawane	Olufsen	01/01/92	?	1992
Pierre Dørge & New Jungle Orchestra (one track from Karawane)	All That Jazz from Denmark 1993	DanDisc	01/01/92	?	1993
The Dedication Orchestra	Spirits Rejoice	Ogun	02/01/92	Gateway Studio, Kingston Hill, Surrey	1992
Various	Moon of Roses	ITM	26/09/93	Kornet-Studio, Cologne, Germany	1995
Annie Whitehead and Rude (one track)	Takin' Off – Jazz from Britain in the Nineties	Jazz on CD	Late 1993	?	1994
Rude	This Is ...	Jazzprint	01/01/94	?	1994
Jah Wobble's Invaders of the Heart	Take Me to God	Island	01/01/94	Greenhouse Studios, London	1994
Annie Whitehead's Rude (one track)	One Night Stands	Blow the Fuse	01/01/94	The Vortex, London N16	
The Dedication Orchestra	Ixesha (Time)	Ogun	03/01/94	Gateway Studio, Kingston Hill, Surrey	1994
2 Badcard	Hustling Ability	On-U Sound	01/01/95		1995
Anglo Italian Quartet	Twice Upon a Time	Splasc(h)	07/05/95	MDV Studio, Turin, Italy	1995
Harry Beckett	Compared 2 What?	Basic	01/01/95	Porcupine Studios, London	1996
Gail Thompson	Jazz Africa	Enja	01/01/96	?	1996
Bill Wells Octet	Live '96	CDR	01/07/96	Intercity Cafe Bar, Glasgow	
Jah Wobble's Invaders Of The Heart	The Celtic Poets	30 Hz	01/01/97		1997
Jah Wobble	Umbra Sumus	30 Hz	01/01/97		1998
The Pendelbury Dream Team	Fine and Mellow	Pendlebury	20/04/97	The Creek Studios, Gwynedd, Wales	1997
Jah Wobble Presents Zi Lan Liao	The Five Tone Dragon	30 Hz	01/01/98		1998
Orchestre National De Jazz/Didier Levallet	ONJ Express	Evidence	27/03/98	Studios Ferber, Paris	1998
Jah Wobble & The Invaders of the Heart	Full Moon Over the Shopping Mall	30 Hz	01/01/99	Intimate Studios, London	1999
Harry Beckett	Tribute to Charles Mingus	Westway	16/01/99 The Premises Studio, Hackney, London E2	2000	
Harry Beckett	Before and After	Spotlite	25/02/99	Band on the Wall, Manchester, UK	2001
Orchestre National De Jazz/Didier Levallet	Sequences	Evidence	11/02/99	? Paris	1999
Various	Soupsongs Live – The Music of Robert Wyatt	Jazzprint	10/10/99	The Palace Theatre, Newark, UK	2002
Orchestre National De Jazz/Didier Levallet	Deep Feelings	Evidence	01/03/00	? Paris	2000
Ramon Lopez	Duets 2 Rahsaan Roland Kirk	Leo Records	17/07/00	Bopcity, Paris	
London Improvisers Orchestra	The Hearing Continues…	Emanem	04/09/00	Gateway Studio, Kingston Hill, Surrey	2001
Chris McGregor's Brotherhood of Breath	The Memorial Concert	ITM	01/01/01	?	2001
Temple of Sound & Rizwan-Muazzam Qawwali	People's Colony No I	Real World	01/01/01		2001
London Improvisers Orchestra	Freedom of the City 2001 – Large Groups	Emanem	06/05/01	Conway Hall, London	2002
Jah Wobble	Fly	30 Hz	01/01/02	Mark Angelo Recording Studios, London	2002
London Improvisers Orchestra	Freedom of the City 2002	Emanem	05/05/02	Freedom of the City festival, Conway Hall, London	2003
Paul Hazel	The Unexpected	Flashlight	28/05/02	The Premises Studio, Hackney, London E2	2002
Jah Wobble and Deep Space Five	Five Beat	30 Hz	01/01/03	Mark Angelo Recording Studios, London	2003
Carol Grimes	Mother	Irregular	01/01/03	?	2003
Adrian Sherwood	Never Trust a Hippy	Real World	24/02/03	On-U Sound Studios, London	2003
London Improvisers Orchestra	London Responses, Reproduction & Reality: Freedom of the City 2003–4	Emanem	04/05/03	Freedom of the City festival, Conway Hall, London	2005
London Improvisers Orchestra	Improvisations for George Riste	psi	06/07/03	Red Rose, Holloway, London N7	2008
Jürgen Wuchner Group Feat. Harry Beckett	Jürgen Wuchner Group Feat. Harry Beckett	West Wind	15/12/03	Darmstadt, Germany	2004
Jah Wobble	Elevator Music Volume 1A	30 Hz	01/01/04	Intimate Studios, London	2004
On-U Sound	On-U Sound Live on Warsaw 2004	Not on Label	24/01/04	Centralny Domu Qultury (CDQ), Warsaw	2004
Jah Wobble	Mu	Trojan	01/01/05	Mark Angelo Studios	2005
Junior Delgado	The Ark of the Covenant (12")	Incredible Music	01/06/05	London	2005
The Wrong Object	& Guests Live 2005	CDR	27/10/05	L'An Vert, Liège, Belgium	2005
The Wrong Object Meets Harry Beckett	Another Time in Belgium	CDR	27/10/05	L'An Vert, Liège, Belgium	2005
Graham Collier	Directing 14 Jackson Pollocks	Jazz Continuum	01/11/04	?	2009
George Haslam, Richard Leigh Harris, Stefano Pastor, Harry Beckett, Steve Kershaw	Holywell Session: Live In Oxford	Slam Productions	17/09/06	Holywell Music Room, Oxford, UK	2007
The Wrong Object	Platform One	Jazzprint	01/01/07	?	2007
London Improvisers Orchestra/Glasgow Improvisers Orchestra	Separately & Together	Emanem	06/05/07	Freedom of the City Festival, Red Rose, London	2008
Harry Beckett	The Modern Sound of Harry Beckett	On-U Sound	01/01/08	On-U Sound Studios, London	2008
Jah Wobble	Car Ad Music	30 Hz	01/01/09	Intimate Studios, London	2009
Duduvudu	The Gospel According to Dudu Pukwana	Edgetone	01/01/10	The Premises Studio, Hackney, London E2	2014
Harry Beckett	Maxine (Compilation 1987–1995)	ITM	1987 – 1995	Various	2011
