= Centipede (band) =

English progressive rock group

- Centipede performing at the Lyceum Theatre in London, 15 November 1970

Background information
- Origin: London, England
- Genres: Free jazz, jazz fusion, progressive rock
- Years active: 1970–1971, 1975
- Label: Neon
- Spinoff of: The Keith Tippett Group
- Past members: See Centipede members

Centipede were an English jazz/progressive rock/big band with more than 50 members, organized and led by the British free jazz pianist Keith Tippett. Formed in 1970, it brought together much of a generation of young British jazz and rock musicians from a number of bands, including Soft Machine, King Crimson, Nucleus and Blossom Toes.

Centipede performed several concerts in England, toured France, and recorded a double album, Septober Energy (produced by Robert Fripp), before disbanding at the end of 1971. They reformed briefly in 1975 to play at a few French jazz festivals.

== History ==
Centipede was formed by Keith Tippett in 1970 to perform an extended composition, Septober Energy, that he had been working on. The members were drawn from his own band at the time, The Keith Tippett Group; several British progressive rock, jazz-rock and avant-garde jazz groups, including Soft Machine (Robert Wyatt, Elton Dean, Nick Evans, Mark Charig), Nucleus (Karl Jenkins, Ian Carr, Brian Smith, Jeff Clyne, Roy Babbington, Bryan Spring, John Stanley Marshall) and King Crimson (Robert Fripp, Peter Sinfield, Ian McDonald, Boz Burrell); and students of the London School of Music. Septober Energy consisted of four movements, or "concepts", that the band improvised around. It was first performed by the band live at the Lyceum Theatre in London on 15 November 1970.

Centipede toured France in November 1970, giving two "memorable performances" at the Alhambra Theatre in Bordeaux. They also played for the Rotterdam Arts Council in the Netherlands, at the Lanchester Arts Festival and the Bristol University Student Union. Centipede's concerts attracted "uneven reviews", with some critics calling Tippett's music "long and leaden", and others praising it as a "bold extension" of what Tippett and his band were already doing.

In April 1971, Neon Records, a British sub-label of RCA in the United States, signed up Tippett and Centipede, and Centipede recorded Tippett's composition on a double album, Septober Energy, in June that year. Robert Fripp produced the album and it was released in October 1971 in the United Kingdom only. Tippett had featured prominently on three of King Crimson's albums (In the Wake of Poseidon, Lizard and Islands) and Fripp had even invited Tippett to join the band (he declined). While some other Crimson members featured on Septober Energy, Fripp, who had performed live with Centipede, did not as he was too busy with his production duties.

Centipede, now reduced in size for economic reasons, gave two performances in London to promote the album, one at the Royal Albert Hall in October 1971, and the other at the Rainbow Theatre in December 1971. But the album was not generally well received by critics and as no further engagements were forthcoming, Centipede disbanded at the end of 1971.

In 1974, RCA issued Septober Energy in the United States, hoping to cash in on Fripp's name as the producer, but it failed, particularly because Centipede did not exist to promote the album with performances. The band did, however, reform briefly in October 1975, with David Cross from King Crimson, to perform at several French jazz festivals.

Tippett said in a January 2003 interview that, in 1970, the Centipede project was "quite innocent" and that "no-one was doing it for the money". Their debut performance at the Lyceum was a benefit concert for the Jazz Centre Society. Tippett said that at the time there was considerable interest in the project, and that while the initial performance consisted of 50 musicians, "there could have been 100".

Tippett later instigated The Ark, another large jazz ensemble that recorded the album Frames (Music For An Imaginary Film) for Ogun Records in 1978.

== Recordings ==
- Septober Energy (1971, 2 LPs, Neon Records)

== Members ==
The members below are the personnel that appeared on Centipede's album, Septober Energy.

Violins

- Wendy Treacher
- Jihn Trussler
- Roddy Skeping
- Wilf Gibson (lead)
- Carol Slater
- Louise Jopling
- Garth Morton
- Channa Salononson
- Steve Rowlandson
- Mica Gomberti
- Colin Kitching
- Philip Saudek
- Esther Burgi

Cellos

- Michael Hurwitz
- Timothy Kramer
- Suki Towb
- John Rees-Jones
- Katherine Thulborn
- Catherine Finnis

Trumpets

- Peter Parkes
- Mick Collins
- Ian Carr (doubling flugelhorn)
- Mongezi Feza (pocket cornet)
- Mark Charig (cornet)

Alto saxophones

- Elton Dean (doubling saxello)
- Jan Steele (doubling flute)
- Ian McDonald
- Dudu Pukwana

Tenor saxophones

- Larry Stabbins
- Gary Windo
- Brian Smith
- Alan Skidmore

Baritone saxophones

- Dave White (doubling clarinet)
- Karl Jenkins (doubling oboe)
- John C. Williams (bass saxophone, doubling soprano)

Trombones

- Nick Evans
- Dave Amis
- Dave Perrottet
- Paul Rutherford

Drums

- John Marshall (and all percussion)
- Tony Fennell
- Robert Wyatt

Vocalists

- Maggie Nichols
- Julie Tippetts
- Mike Patto
- Zoot Money
- Boz Burrell

Basses

- Roy Babbington (doubling bass guitar)
- Gill Lyons
- Harry Miller
- Jeff Clyne
- Dave Markee
- Brian Belshaw

Guitar

- Brian Godding
- Ollie Halsall

Piano

- Keith Tippett (musical director)
