= How Many Clouds Can You See? =

Studio album by John Surman
- Released: 1970
- Genre: Jazz
- Length: 45:52
- Label: Deram
- Producer: Peter Eden

John Surman chronology
John Surman (1969)	How Many Clouds Can You See? (1970)	Live in Altena (1970)

How Many Clouds Can You See? is the second album by English saxophonist John Surman featuring Harry Beckett, Alan Skidmore, Barre Phillips, and Tony Oxley recorded in 1970 and released on the Deram label.

== Reception ==
Professional ratings
Review scores
Source	Rating
Allmusic	4.5/5 stars
All About Jazz	4.5/5 stars
The Penguin Guide to Jazz Recordings	3.5/4 stars

Allmusic awards the album 4 1/2 stars and its review by Jason Ankeny states: "John Surman's second album remains his most impressive, anticipating the sound and scope of the European free jazz movement that would blossom in the decade to come". John Kelman in his All About Jazz review states: "While woodwind multi-instrumentalist John Surman's eponymous debut was a strange mixture of everything from free improvisation to calypso, his second date, 1970's How Many Clouds Can You See?, is a much more focused affair. Surman clearly references one of his roots, John Coltrane, albeit on an instrument that the legendary saxophonist never played.

== Track listing ==
All compositions by John Surman except where noted.

=== Side one ===
1. "Galata Bridge"
2. "Caractacus"
3. "Premonition" (John Warren)

=== Side two ===
1. "Event"
  1. "Gathering"
  2. "Ritual")
  3. "Circle Dance"
2. "How Many Clouds Can You See?" (Note: The 1998 Deram CD reissue reverses the order of the LP sides.)

== Personnel ==
Musicians

- Mike Osborne – alto saxophone (1, 3)
- John Warren – baritone saxophone, flute (3)
- John Surman – baritone saxophone, soprano saxophone, bass clarinet
- Barre Phillips (3-5), Harry Miller (1) – bass
- Alan Jackson (1-2), Tony Oxley (3-5) – drums
- Alan Skidmore – tenor saxophone, flute (1, 3)
- Chris Pyne (3), Malcolm Griffiths (1, 3) – trombone
- Dave Holdsworth – trumpet (3)
- Harold Beckett – trumpet, flugelhorn (1, 3)
- John Taylor – piano (1, 3-5)
- George Smith – tuba (3)

Other credits

- Bill Price, Dave Grinsted – engineer
- Miles Kington – liner notes
- David Osborne – photography
