= The Dedication Orchestra =

The Dedication Orchestra is a jazz ensemble formed as a tribute to the exiled South African musicians who formed the core of The Blue Notes and the Brotherhood of Breath, it features Alan Skidmore, Radu Malfatti, Django Bates, Kenny Wheeler, Elton Dean, Lol Coxhill, Evan Parker, Paul Rutherford and many others, including Keith Tippett on piano, Louis Moholo on drums and with Julie Tippetts and Maggie Nichols on vocals.

== Discography ==
- Spirits Rejoice (1992, Ogun Records, recorded at Gateway Studios, 2 and 3 January 1992)
- Ixesha (Time) (1994, Ogun Records)
