= Travelling Somewhere =

Live album by Chris McGregor's Brotherhood of Breath
- Released: 2001
- Recorded: January 19, 1973
- Venue: Lila Eule, Bremen, Germany
- Genre: Free jazz
- Length: 1:19:29
- Label: Cuneiform; Rune 152
- Producer: Peter Schulze

Brotherhood of Breath chronology
In Memoriam (1994)	Travelling Somewhere (2001)	Bremen to Bridgwater (2004)

Travelling Somewhere is a live album by South African pianist and composer Chris McGregor's big band Brotherhood of Breath. It was recorded on January 19, 1973, at Lila Eule, a jazz club in Bremen, Germany, and was released by Cuneiform Records in 2001. The recording took place eight days before the concert heard on Live at Willisau (Ogun, 1974).

== Reception ==
Professional ratings
Review scores
Source	Rating
AllMusic	3/5 stars
Tom Hull – on the Web	A−

In a review for AllMusic, François Couture called the album "a welcome addition to the group's very short discography," and noted that the "modern big band was in top shape... Each musician is a creative force by himself. Together they played an overwhelming maelstrom of free jazz."

Andrey Henkin of All About Jazz wrote: "This album is a must-have for fans of the Brotherhood of Breath; for those who appreciate the progressive big band of Carla Bley or Keith Tippett's Centipede; and for anyone who wishes to explore non-American jazz... a great addition to the unfortunately little available by this historic ensemble."

Writing for JazzTimes, Bill Shoemaker commented: "Travelling Somewhere is an important addition to the rich legacy of the South African exiles. Theirs is a story that should be known by heart by all those claiming a scholarly interest in jazz, as it exemplifies the pain and grace that give voice to the music. For those who don’t know their story, take this disc to the shed."

The BBC's Bill Tilland remarked: "there's an exuberant energy and density to these 1973 performances... which at times reaches an almost ecstatic intensity. It's almost as if the Sun Ra Arkestra had been reconstituted in a parallel African reality... the band's performance here is not just an important historical document, but even thirty-some years after the fact, a representation of some of the most vital and life-affirming big band jazz ever played by anyone, anywhere."

== Track listing ==
1. "MRA" (Dudu Pukwana) – 12:15
2. "Restless" (Chris McGregor) – 9:48
3. "Ismite is Might" (Chris McGregor) – 3:59
4. "Kongi's Theme" (Wole Soyinka) – 6:44
5. "Wood Fire" (Chris McGregor) – 13:42
6. "The Bride" (Dudu Pukwana) – 6:26
7. "Travelling Somewhere" (Chris McGregor) – 7:21
8. "Think of Something" (Mike Osborne) – 9:55
9. "Do It" (Chris McGregor) – 9:19

== Personnel ==
- Chris McGregor – piano
- Dudu Pukwana – alto saxophone
- Mike Osborne – alto saxophone
- Evan Parker – tenor saxophone
- Gary Windo – tenor saxophone
- Mongezi Feza – trumpet
- Harry Beckett – trumpet
- Marc Charig – trumpet
- Nick Evans – trombone
- Malcolm Griffiths – trombone
- Harry Miller – bass
- Louis Moholo – drums
