= Uplift the People =

Live album by Louis Moholo-Moholo's Five Blokes
- Released: 2018
- Recorded: April 14, 2017
- Venue: Cafe Oto, London
- Genre: Free jazz
- Label: Ogun; OGCD 047
- Producer: Hazel Miller

Louis Moholo chronology
Distant Groove (2015)	Uplift the People (2018)	Live @ the Vortex Jazz Club (2020)

Uplift the People is a live album by drummer Louis Moholo-Moholo. It was recorded on April 14, 2017, at Cafe Oto in London, and was released in 2018 by Ogun Records. On the album, Moholo-Moholo is joined by members of his band, the Five Blokes: saxophonists Shabaka Hutchings and Jason Yarde, pianist Alexander Hawkins, and bassist John Edwards.

== Reception ==
Professional ratings
Review scores
Source	Rating
The Free Jazz Collective	4/5 stars
All About Jazz	4.5/5 stars
Jazzwise	4/5 stars
Tom Hull – on the Web	B+

In a review for The Free Jazz Collective, Hinrich Julius wrote: "The songs use powerful and rather simple melodies with an African feel to it introduced and sustained through unison playing, mostly by the horns. This background is used by all players taking opportunities to freak out... constant tension filled with joy is probably the most special feature of this music... Highly recommended."

John Sharpe of All About Jazz called the recording "an album which captures some of the intense excitement, wayward adventure and sheer joy of a group which has wowed audiences at festivals and clubs across Europe and North America," and stated: "Gorgeous melodies... seemingly emerge unheralded from a swirl of fast changing kaleidoscopic exchange. But in fact close listening reveals Moholo-Moholo's prompting drum patterns, cues and verbal encouragements picked up... by the band. Indeed how they embrace the apparent disorder is part of the charm."

Writing for Jazzwise, Kevin Le Gendre noted that the band's "ability to negotiate rousing themes, stomping grooves and soaring passages of rubato, all held together by the ferocity and elasticity of Moholo-Moholo's work on the kit, is winningly appealing," and praised the "great richness of the repertoire."

The New York City Jazz Record's Marc Medwin commented: "As with sets from Miles Davis and Wayne Shorter, tunes flow without pause. Rhythm section arcs of ebb and flow support rapid-fire saxophone exhortations, 'New Thing' honks and squeaks in perfect symbiosis with each tune's melodic form or implication... As he approaches his 80th birthday this month, Moholo-Moholo is at a creative peak, joined by musicians to match; the album lives up to its title."

== Track listing ==
1. "Dikeledi Tsa Phelo" (Pule Pheto) – 8:24
2. "Do It" (Chris McGregor) – 4:45
3. "Lost Opportunities" (Harry Miller) – 5:57
4. "Ezontakana (Those Little Birds)" (Louis Moholo-Moholo) – 3:32
5. "B My Dear" (Dudu Pukwana) – 6:30
6. "Ngwoele Ngwoele" (Gibson Kente) – 3:41
7. "For the Blue Notes" (Louis Moholo-Moholo) – 2:56
8. "Nkosi Sikelel' iAfrika" (Enoch Sontonga) – 2:23
9. "Zanele" (Pule Pheto) – 4:13
10. "Lakutshon'llanga" (Mackay Davashe) – 3:19
11. "Angel-Nomali" (Dudu Pukwana) – 5:29

== Personnel ==
- Louis Moholo-Moholo – drums
- Shabaka Hutchings – saxophone
- Jason Yarde – saxophone
- Alexander Hawkins – piano
- John Edwards – bass
