= Chris McGregor's Brotherhood of Breath =

Studio album by Chris McGregor's Brotherhood of Breath
- Released: 1971
- Recorded: 1970
- Genre: Free jazz
- Label: RCA/Neon; NE2
- Producer: Joe Boyd

Brotherhood of Breath chronology
Chris McGregor's Brotherhood of Breath (1971)	Brotherhood (1972)

Chris McGregor's Brotherhood of Breath is the debut album by South African pianist and composer Chris McGregor's big band of the same name. Produced by Joe Boyd, it was recorded in 1970, and was issued on LP by the short-lived Neon imprint of RCA Records in 1971 as the label's second release. In 2007, it was reissued on CD by Fledg'ling Records.

The music reflects the influences of both jazz and traditional African music. Regarding his arrangements, McGregor stated: "You get a feeling for areas you want to explore... It was to do with African polyrhythm. I started hearing the possibilities of things happening on a lot of different levels rhythmically. There was a wheel turning then, things flowing together..." Author W. C. Bamberger described the music as "simple, rhythmic, with the parts entering one by one and interlocking, with the sections, line after line, increasing the torque of syncopated complexity until the ear can barely keep up, then backing off and, most often, starting again."

== Reception ==
Professional ratings
Review scores
Source	Rating
AllMusic	4/5 stars
The Jazz Mann	4/5 stars
Tom Hull – on the Web	A−
The Virgin Encyclopedia of Jazz	4/5 stars

In a review for AllMusic, Dean McFarlane called the band "a group of extraordinary musicians from the free jazz, progressive rock, and improvisation scenes," and wrote: "Brotherhood of Breath created one of the defining recordings of ethno-jazz with this album... [it] is driven by the organic pulse of the rhythm section -- bassist Harry Miller and drummer Louis Moholo, no less -- who will be names familiar to fans of British free jazz. This album comes highly recommended to fans of Don Cherry, Afro-beat sounds, and the Sun Ra Arkestra."

Critic Tom Hull awarded the album a grade of "A−", and described the music as "Township jive with avant drive and distortions, a marvelous formula McGregor sustained for two decades."

Writing for Point of Departure, Bill Shoemaker called the recording "an album that flowed effortlessly from beginning to end," with "MRA" as "an ideal, exhilarating opening track." He stated that the 21-minute "Night Poem" "signaled a new direction," and remarked: "There is an organic quality in how 'Night Poem' unfolds that would present with increasingly frequency in Brotherhood performances into the mid-'70s."

W. C. Bamberger stated: "What caught jazz and even pop fans' ears and imaginations was the feeling that the band was barely under control, a raging giant rhythm and sound generator that might take them anywhere. A reputation well-deserved - with the Keith Moon-meets-Roy Tyner drumming of Moholo, Pukwana's crosscut alto and Feza's shape-shifting pocket trumpet together carrying the standard of 'freedom above all.'"

== Track listing ==
1. "MRA" (Dudu Pukwana) – 5:02
2. "Davashe's Dream" (Mackay Davashe) – 7:30
3. "The Bride" (Dudu Pukwana) – 7:41
4. "Andromeda" (Chris McGregor) – 4:07
5. "Night Poem" (Chris McGregor) – 20:46
6. "Union Special" (Chris McGregor) – 1:42

== Personnel ==
- Chris McGregor – leader, piano, African xylophone
- Dudu Pukwana – alto saxophone
- Mike Osborne – alto saxophone, clarinet, flute
- Ronnie Beer – tenor saxophone, flute
- Alan Skidmore – tenor saxophone, soprano saxophone
- John Surman – baritone saxophone, soprano saxophone
- Harry Beckett – trumpet
- Mongezi Feza – trumpet, flute
- Marc Charig – cornet
- Malcolm Griffiths – trombone
- Nick Evans – trombone
- Harry Miller – bass
- Louis Moholo – drums, percussion
