= Live at Willisau =

Live album by Chris McGregor's Brotherhood of Breath
- Released: 1974
- Recorded: January 27, 1973
- Venue: Willisau, Switzerland
- Genre: Free jazz
- Length: 39:02
- Label: Ogun; OG 100

Brotherhood of Breath chronology
Brotherhood (1972)	Live at Willisau (1974)	Procession (1978)

Live at Willisau is a live album by South African pianist and composer Chris McGregor's big band Brotherhood of Breath. It was recorded on January 27, 1973, in Willisau, Switzerland, and was released on LP by Ogun Records in 1974. In 1994, the album was reissued on CD with extra tracks. The recording took place eight days after the concert heard on Travelling Somewhere (Cuneiform, 2001).

== Reception ==
Professional ratings
Review scores
Source	Rating
AllMusic	4/5 stars
The Penguin Guide to Jazz	3.5/4 stars
Tom Hull – on the Web	A−
The Virgin Encyclopedia of Jazz	3/5 stars

In a review for AllMusic, Scott Yanow wrote: "This is intriguing music that should have been more extensively documented. Adventurous listeners can be grateful that at least this document and a few others exist."

The authors of The Penguin Guide to Jazz Recordings stated: "this is affirmative music of a rare sort, bringing together African kwela, free jazz, post-Ellington swing and even touches of classicism in a boiling mix that grips the heart."

In an article for Bells, Henry Kuntz called the album "McGregor’s best record yet," and commented: "McGregor's scores stem mainly from strong and simple themes that reflect the South African idioms that did so much to fuel his sextet and, later, Spear, and from the song tradition bequeathed from Albert Ayler... They ride easily over a good rhythm section where for once Louis Moholo has been recorded at his unrestrained best. There are plenty of good solos too."

Author John Litweiler stated that the album "mingles swinging ensembles and catchy rhythms with collective cacophony... Agony and ecstasy mingle indescribably; the music is a volatile release of tensions, into—what? There's no conclusion to the music, no resolution, no catharsis, not even exhaustion."

Critic Tom Hull remarked: "They can get pretty far out, but South African roots run deep, and when they get the jive working... it's quite some party."

== LP track listing ==
Side A

1. "Do It" (Chris McGregor) – 9:54
2. "Restless" (Chris McGregor) – 2:38
3. "Kongi's Theme" (Chris McGregor) – 6:45

Side B

1. "Tungi's Song" (Tungi Oyelana) – 6:45
2. "Ismite is Might" (Chris McGregor) – 4:30
3. "The Serpents Kindly Eye" (Chris McGregor) – 8:30

== CD track listing ==
1. "Do It" (Chris McGregor) – 11:08
2. "Restless" (Chris McGregor) – 2:40
3. "Camel Dance" (Chris McGregor) – 7:13
4. "Davashe's Dream" (Mackay Davashe) – 7:44
5. "Kongi's Theme" (Chris McGregor) – 6:40
6. "Tunji's Song" (Tungi Oyelana) – 6:51
7. "Ismite is Might" (Chris McGregor) – 4:28
8. "The Serpent's Kindly Eye" (Chris McGregor) – 8:25
9. "Andromeda" (Chris McGregor) – 3:58
10. "Union Special" (Chris McGregor) – :57
11. "Funky Boots" (Gary Windo, Nick Evans) – 5:41

== Personnel ==
- Chris McGregor – leader, piano
- Dudu Pukwana – alto saxophone
- Evan Parker – tenor saxophone
- Gary Windo – tenor saxophone
- Mongezi Feza – trumpet
- Harry Beckett – trumpet
- Marc Charig – trumpet
- Nick Evans – trombone
- Radu Malfatti – trombone
- Harry Miller – bass
- Louis Moholo – drums
