= Different Times, Different Places =

Studio album by Harry Miller
- Released: 2013 and 2016
- Recorded: 1973–1982
- Genre: Free jazz
- Label: Ogun; OGCD 041 (Vol. 1); OGCD 045 (Vol. 2)
- Producer: Hazel Miller

Harry Miller chronology
| The Birmingham Jazz Concert (2012) | Different Times, Different Places (2013) |

Volume Two cover

Different Times, Different Places, Volumes 1 and 2, is a pair of archival recordings by South African double bassist and composer Harry Miller. Volume 1 was recorded during 1973 and 1976, and features Miller along with saxophonist Mike Osborne, trumpeter Mark Charig, trombonists Nick Evans and Malcolm Griffiths, pianists Chris McGregor and Keith Tippett, and drummer Louis Moholo-Moholo. Volume 2 was recorded during 1977, 1978, and 1982, and features Miller with saxophonists Alan Wakeman and Trevor Watts, trumpeter Dave Holdsworth, trombonist Alan Tomlinson, guitarist Bernie Holland, pianist Keith Tippett, and drummer Louis Moholo-Moholo. Volume 1 was released by Ogun Records in 2013, while Volume 2 was released by Ogun in 2016. Both volumes showcase Miller's compositions.

== Reception ==
Professional ratings
Review scores
| Source | Rating |
|---|---|
| Financial Times Volume 1 | 4/5 stars |
| The Free Jazz Collective Volume 1 | 4.5/5 stars |
| The Guardian Volume 1 | 3/5 stars |
| Tom Hull – on the Web Volume 1 | A− |
| Tom Hull – on the Web Volume 2 | B+ |

Mike Hobart of the Financial Times noted the "pulsating riffs, moments of calm... horns playing with passion and technical flair," and stated: "The powerful and firm-fingered Miller developed a telepathic relationship with drummer and fellow exile Louis Moholo Moholo, and they switch mood in the blink of an eye."

A reviewer for The Free Jazz Collective wrote: "it's difficult not to be astounded by the drive and synchronicity of this rhythm section. Harry, Louis and Keith were probably one of the outstanding teams of that period, constantly adventurous yet always swinging, even in the wildest moments... Very highly recommended."

The Guardian's John Fordham commented: "Gripping episodes abound... Those who remember Miller's heyday will love this rough-hewn document, as will fans of the South Africa-celebrating Townships Comets and Moholo-Moholo's current work."

A writer for the Morning Star praised Miller's "phenomenal bounce" and "eternal pulse, adding a universal life to all his confreres," and remarked: "thanks be to the pioneering spirit... of Ogun Records which keeps him there as an examplar to anyone, anywhere who ever picks up their bass."

Writing for Point of Departure, Bill Shoemaker called the recording "an album not to be missed," and stated that it "reinforces the consensus that Miller had very few peers when it came to driving a band or throwing down an incendiary solo; but, it should also reopen the discussion of his gifts as a composer."

== Track listing ==
Composed by Harry Miller.

=== Volume 1 ===
1. "Bloomfield" – 6:08
2. "Quandry" – 8:14
3. "Touch Hungry" – 9:04
4. "Mofolo" – 12:53
5. "Something Like This" – 10:54
6. "Touch Hungry" – 12:54
7. "Eli's Song" – 17:12
- Tracks 1–3 were recorded in London on June 4, 1973. Tracks 4–7 were recorded at the Chateauvallon Jazz Festival in France on July 7, 1976.

Volume 1 personnel

- Harry Miller – bass
- Mike Osborne – alto saxophone
- Mark Charig – trumpet (tracks 4–7)
- Nick Evans – trombone (tracks 1–3)
- Malcolm Griffiths – trombone (tracks 4–7)
- Chris McGregor – piano (tracks 1–3)
- Keith Tippett – piano (tracks 4–7)
- Louis Moholo-Moholo – drums

=== Volume 2 ===
1. "Orange Grove" – 9:17
2. "Miss Liz" – 8:52
3. "The Magician" – 8:36
4. "Door Key" – 10:30
5. "Down South" – 8:53
6. "Ikaya" – 11:46
7. "Mofolo" – 4:51
- Track 1 was recorded during December 1977. Tracks 2–4 were recorded during August 1978. Tracks 5–7 were recorded during September 1982.

Volume 2 personnel

- Harry Miller – bass
- Alan Wakeman – saxophone (tracks 1–4)
- Trevor Watts – saxophone
- Dave Holdsworth – trumpet (tracks 5–7)
- Alan Tomlinson – trombone (tracks 5–7)
- Bernie Holland – guitar (track 1)
- Keith Tippett – piano (tracks 2–4)
- Louis Moholo-Moholo – drums
