= Bush Fire =

Studio album by Louis Moholo / Evan Parker / Pule Pheto / Gibo Pheto / Barry Guy
- Released: 1996
- Recorded: July 1995
- Studio: Gateway Studio, London
- Genre: Free jazz
- Length: 78:43
- Label: Ogun Records (OGCD 009)

Bush Fire is a collaborative album by South African drummer Louis Moholo, British saxophonist Evan Parker, South African pianist Pule Pheto, and bassists Gibo Pheto and Barry Guy. It was recorded in July 1995 at Gateway Studio in London and released in 1996 by Ogun Records.

== Reception ==
Professional ratings
Review scores
Source	Rating
AllMusic	4.5/5 stars
The Penguin Guide to Jazz	3/4 stars
Tom Hull – on the Web	B+

In a review for AllMusic, Thom Jurek awarded the album 4.5 stars, describing it as "worth raving about for its execution," and highlighting "the defined and near-symbiotic musical relationship between Moholo and Parker" as "perhaps most astonishing." He concluded: "It's a breathtaking ride through the outer edges of free jazz, but it's one so musical, so lyrically brilliant, it could never be repeated. Thank the heavens for this recording."

The Penguin Guide to Jazz Recordings awarded the album 3 stars, calling it "hugely impressive and moving," and noting that it "underlines Moholo's extraordinary ability to mix the hottest African grooves with entirely free playing."

== Track listing ==
1. "Bush Fire" – 13:24
2. "For Chisa" – 7:12
3. "South Afrika is Free - Ok?" – 11:48
4. "Baobab" – 9:25
5. "Mark of Respect" – 4:18
6. "Back Beat" – 6:26
7. "Sticks" – 4:52
8. "Coincidence" – 5:03
9. "Flaming July" – 8:15
10. "For Mpumi" – 8:03

== Personnel ==
- Evan Parker – tenor saxophone, soprano saxophone
- Pule Pheto – piano
- Barry Guy – bass, piccolo bass
- Gibo Pheto – bass
- Louis Moholo – drums
