= Nick Evans (trombonist) =

Welsh trombonist (born 1947)

- Born: Nicholas Kenneth Dacre Evans; 9 January 1947 (age 79); Newport, Monmouthshire, Wales
- Genres: Jazz; progressive rock; Canterbury scene
- Instrument: Trombone

Nicolas Kenneth Dacre Evans (born 9 January 1947 in Newport, Monmouthshire, Wales), professionally known as Nick Evans, is a Welsh former jazz and progressive rock trombonist.

== Career ==
Evans worked in the Graham Collier Sextet (1968–69), Keith Tippett Group (1968–70), Soft Machine (1969), Brotherhood of Breath (1970–74), Centipede (1970–71), Just Us (1972–73), Ambush (1972), Ninesense (1975–80), Intercontinental Express (1976), Ark (1976, 1978), Nicra (1977), Dudu Pukwana's Diamond Express (1977), Spirits Rejoice (1978–79), and Dreamtime (1983).

== Early years ==
He started playing the trombone at age 11 and by 1966 he had joined the New Welsh Jazz Orchestra. In that period he first joined the Graham Collier Sextet. In 1968 at the Barry school he worked with Keith Tippett and became a founding member of his sextet. He later worked with South African band Brotherhood of Breath and also Soft Machine. He was a peripheral figure in the Canterbury scene.

Evans also appeared on the album Lizard by the progressive rock band, King Crimson, in 1970.

== Discography ==
- 1969 : The heart of the blues is sound by Champion Jack Dupree
- 1969 : Down Another Road by Graham Collier Sextet
- 1969 : Manfred Mann Chapter Three by Manfred Mann Chapter Three
- 1970 : Third by Soft Machine
- 1970 : Lizard by King Crimson
- 1970 : You are here... I am there by Keith Tippett
- 1970 : Die Jazz-Werkstatt '70 by Various Artists
- 1971 : Conflagration by The Trio
- 1971 : Chris McGregor's Brotherhood of Breath by Chris McGregor's Brotherhood of Breath
- 1971 : Banana Moon by Daevid Allen
- 1971 : Out of nowhere by Henry Schifter
- 1971 : Blue Memphis by Memphis Slim
- 1971 : Fourth by Soft Machine
- 1971 : Dedicated To You, But You Weren't Listening by The Keith Tippett Group
- 1971 : Brotherhood by Chris McGregor's Brotherhood Of Breath
- 1971 : Septober Energy by Centipede
- 1971 : Time of the Last Persecution by Bill Fay
- 1971 : 1969 by Julie Driscoll
- 1971 : Reg King by Reg King
- 1971 : Rites and Rituals by Ray Russell
- 1971 : Worker's Playtime by B B Blunder
- 1972 : Graham Bell by Graham Bell
- 1973 : 1984 by Hugh Hopper
- 1974 : Live at Willisau by Chris McGregor's Brotherhood Of Breath
- 1974 : Alexis Korner Mister Blues by Alexis Korner - With Mel Collins, Boz Burrell, Ian Wallace, Elton Dean, Zoot Money, etc.
- 1975 : Sunset Glow by Julie Tippetts
- 1975 : Desperate Straights by Slapp Happy/Henry Cow
- 1976 : Thunder into Our Hearts by Jabula
- 1976 : London by Intercontinental Express
- 1976 : Oh ! For The Edge by Elton Dean's Ninesense
- 1977 : Triple Echo by Soft Machine - 3 LP Boxset
- 1977 : Happy Daze by Elton Dean's Ninesense
- 1977 : Listen/Hear by Nicra
- 1978 : Frames (Music For An Imaginary Film) by Keith Tippett's Ark
- 1978 : Diamond Express by Dudu Pukwana
- 1978 : Spirits Rejoice by Louis Moholo Octet
- 1981 : Yes Please ! Angoulème 1981 by Chris McGregor's Brotherhood Of Breath
- 1984 : Bunny Up by Dreamtime
- 1985 : Hat Music by Katie Perks
- 1985 : The Bologna Tapes by Elton Dean Quintet
- 1986 : A Loose Kite In A Gentle Wind Floating With Only My Will For An Anchor by Keith Tippett Sextet
- 1986 : T.R.O.U.B.L.E by Vic Godard
- 1987 : Andy Sheppard by Andy Sheppard
- 1988 : Alexis Korner And... 1972 - 1983 by Alexis Korner
- 1988 : Copy Cats by Johnny Thunders & Patti Palladin
- 1988 : Willkommen In West-Poind-Blanc by Clowns & Helden
- 1988 : Born to Cry by Johnny Thunders
- 2001 : Travelling Somewhere by Chris McGregor's Brotherhood Of Breath
- 2004 : Bremen to Bridgwater by Chris McGregor's Brotherhood Of Breath
- 2006 : Which Way Now by Harry Miller's Isipingo, recorded in 1975
- 2008 : Eclipse at Dawn by Chris McGregor's Brotherhood Of Breath
- 2009 : Full Steam Ahead by Harry Miller's Isipingo, recorded during 1975–1977
- 2016 : Different Times, Different Places by Harry Miller, recorded during 1973–1976
