= Gary Windo =

English jazz tenor saxophonist (1941–1992)

- Born: 7 November 1941; Brighton, England
- Died: 25 July 1992 (aged 50) New York City
- Genres: Jazz, jazz fusion, avant-garde jazz
- Occupation: Musician
- Instrument: Saxophone
- Years active: 1960s–1992

Gary Windo (7 November 1941 in Brighton, England – 25 July 1992 in New York City) was an English jazz tenor saxophonist.

== Career ==
Windo came from a musical family in England. By the age of six, he had begun playing the drums and accordion, later adding guitar at twelve and saxophone at seventeen.He lived in the United States during the 1960s but returned to England in 1969. In the early 1970s, his career grew as he founded the Gary Windo Quartet and worked with Carla Bley, Brotherhood of Breath, Centipede, Matching Mole, The Running Man, and Nick Mason.

Sonny Stitt heard Windo play at the Berlin Jazz Festival and asked him to join the band, which he declined. He worked outside jazz, with the Psychedelic Furs, Robert Wyatt, NRBQ, and for the comedy television show Saturday Night Live. He taught music lessons with his friend Eric Peralli.

Windo could play many reed instruments, including soprano sax and bass clarinet. His time in America exposed him to all types of jazz. He died from an asthma attack in 1992. He is survived by his wife Siobhan Hunter.

== Discography ==
=== As leader ===
- Dogface (Europa, 1982)
- Deep Water (Antilles, 1988)
- His Master's Bones (Cuneiform, 1996)
- Anglo American (Cuneiform, 2004)
- Avant Gardeners (Reel, 2007)
- Steam Radio Tapes (Gonzo, 2013)

=== As sideman ===
With Hugh Hopper

- 1984 (CBS, 1973)
- Hopper Tunity Box (Compendium, 1977)
- A Remark Hugh Made (Shimmy Disc, 1994)

With Chris McGregor

- Brotherhood (RCA Victor, 1972)
- Live at Willisau (Ogun, 1974)
- Travelling Somewhere (Cuneiform, 2001)
- Bremen to Bridgwater (Cuneiform, 2004)
- Eclipse at Dawn (Cuneiform, 2008)

With NRBQ

- Grooves in Orbit (Bearsville, 1983)
- Lou and the Q (Rounder, 1985)
- Honest Dollar (Rykodisc, 1992)
- Message for the Mess Age (Forward, 1994)

With Robert Wyatt

- Rock Bottom (Virgin, 1974)
- Ruth Is Stranger Than Richard (Virgin, 1975)
- Theatre Royal Drury Lane 8th September 1974 (Hannibal, 1981)
- Flotsam Jetsam (Rough Trade, 1994)
- His Greatest Misses (Domino, 2004)
- Different Every Time (Domino, 2014)

With others

- Alan Shorter, Tes Estat (America, 1970)
- Daevid Allen, Jungle Windo(w) (Charly, 1982)
- Daevid Allen, Opium for the People/Alien in New York (Spalax Music, 1996)
- Carla Bley, European Tour 1977 (WATT/ECM, 1978)
- Carla Bley, Musique Mecanique (WATT, 1979)
- Jean-Patrick Capdevielle, L'Ennemi Public (CBS, 1982)
- Centipede, Septober Energy (RCA/Neon, 1971)
- The Cover Girls, Show Me (Fever, 1987)
- Ian Hunter, Short Back 'n' Sides (Chrysalis, 1981)
- Michael Mantler, More Movies (WATT/ECM 1980)
- Nick Mason, Nick Mason's Fictitious Sports (Harvest, 1981)
- Tommy Morrison, Place Your Bets (Real 1979)
- The Psychedelic Furs, Forever Now (CBS, 1982)
- The Pursuit of Happiness, One Sided Story (Chrysalis, 1990)
- Ray Russell, Secret Asylum (Black Lion, 1973)
- Alexander von Schlippenbach & Carla Bley, 50 Jahre Jazz Fest Berlin (Berliner Festspiele 2014)
