= Procession (Live at Toulouse) =

Live album by Chris McGregor's Brotherhood of Breath
- Released: 1978
- Recorded: May 10, 1977
- Venue: Halle aux Grains, Toulouse, France
- Genre: Free jazz
- Label: Ogun; OG 524 / OGCD 040
- Producer: Chris McGregor, Keith Beal, Hazel Miller

Brotherhood of Breath chronology
Live at Willisau (1974)	Procession (Live at Toulouse) (1978)	Yes Please (1981)

Procession (Live at Toulouse) is a live album by South African pianist and composer Chris McGregor's big band Brotherhood of Breath. It was recorded on May 10, 1977, at Halle aux Grains in Toulouse, France, and was released on LP by Ogun Records in 1978. In 2013, Ogun reissued the album on CD with three extra tracks.

== Reception ==
Professional ratings
Review scores
Source	Rating
AllMusic	4/5 stars
The Guardian	4/5 stars
Tom Hull – on the Web	A−
The Encyclopedia of Popular Music	3/5 stars

In a review for AllMusic, Scott Yanow wrote: "Although the themes are strong, the emphasis is on improvising, particularly by the full group together, and there are plenty of intense sections... Recommended to open-eared listeners, this is one of the Brotherhood of Breath's best recordings."

The Guardian's John Fordham called the band "a cauldron of South African dance grooves, American free jazz and Duke Ellington harmonies," and commented: "This music sounds rough and unfinished, rather like a big-band version of Albert Ayler's early recordings. But it has Ayler's haunting mix of anguish, soul and hope, too."

Ken Waxman of Jazz Word stated: "the craftiness of the arrangements is such that sounds are both lilting and grounded in technical mastery. Adding just the bare minimum of notes to direct the band..., McGregor, plus bassists Johnny Dyanni and Harry Miller plus drummer Louis Moholo... effortlessly induce the beat. But at the same time stimulating horn vamps pull back enough so notable chases between trumpet triplets and slippery reed extensions are clearly heard."

Writing for The Quietus, Sean Kitching noted that the album provides "a taste of the full, gloriously melodic yet free jazz-squall of the group in full flight."

== LP track listing ==
1. "Sunrise on the Sun" (Chris McGregor) – 17:30
2. "Sonia" (Mongezi Feza) – 4:35
3. "Kwhalo" (Dudu Pukwana) – 18:35

== CD track listing ==
1. "You Ain't Gonna Know Me 'Cos You Think You Know Me" (Mongezi Feza) – 6:33
2. "Sunrise on the Sun" (Chris McGregor) – 17:10
3. "Sonia" (Mongezi Feza) – 8:42
4. "Kwhalo" (Dudu Pukwana) – 18:35
5. "TBS" (Chris McGregor) – 8:19
6. "Andromeda" (Chris McGregor) – 4:05

== Personnel ==
- Chris McGregor – piano
- Dudu Pukwana – alto saxophone
- Mike Osborne – alto saxophone
- Evan Parker – tenor saxophone
- Bruce Grant – baritone saxophone, flute
- Harry Beckett – trumpet
- Marc Charig – trumpet
- Radu Malfatti – trombone
- Johnny Dyani – bass
- Harry Miller – bass
- Louis Moholo – drums
