= Kathy Stobart =

English jazz saxophonist (1925–2014)

- Born: Florence Kathleen Stobart; 1 April 1925; South Shields, County Durham (now Tyne and Wear), England
- Died: 6 July 2014 (aged 89) London, England
- Genres: Jazz
- Occupation: Musician
- Instruments: Tenor, baritone and alto saxophone
- Years active: 1939-2007
- Website: kathystobart.co.uk

Florence Kathleen "Kathy" Stobart (1 April 1925 – 6 July 2014) was an English jazz saxophonist primarily known for playing the tenor sax. She was a well-respected figure in the history of jazz in Britain and became an inspiration, through her tutoring of music, to a whole new generation of younger female musicians.

== Early life ==
Stobart was born in South Shields, County Durham (now Tyne and Wear), England, the third child of Matthew and Jessie Stobart, her mother was a pianist and her father was a police officer. She first learned piano as a child. After picking up the saxophone, she first played in Don Rico's all-female band at the age of 14, then locally in Newcastle.

== Career ==
In 1942, aged 17, she moved to London, playing with Denis Rose, Ted Heath and Jimmy Skidmore. Later that decade she played with Art Pepper and Peanuts Hucko. She played with Canadian pianist Art Thompson (1918-2003) whom she joined in 1943, and was married to him from 1943-1951. He led the band at London's Embassy Club, then a favourite London haunt for visiting stars such as Bing Crosby and Bob Hope.

She toured with Vic Lewis in 1949 and led her own group in 1950-51; among its members were Derek Humble, Dill Jones, and Bert Courtley whom she married in October 1951 until his death in September 1969. In the 1950s and 1960s, she went into semi-retirement to raise her family. From 1969 to 1977, she played with Humphrey Lyttelton. Following this she led her own groups, with Harry Beckett, John Burch, and vibes player Lennie Best, among others. Aside from this she played with Johnny Griffin, Al Haig, Earl Hines, Buddy Tate, Zoot Sims, Marian McPartland, and Dick Hyman. Throughout the 1960s and 1970s she taught adult music classes along with the pianist-trombonist Eddie Harvey at the City Literary Institute in Holborn, London.

During the period 1978-1992 she formed the Kathy Stobart Quintet originally featuring Harry Beckett (trumpet); Fiachra Trench (keyboards); Dave Olney (bass); Tony Mann (drums), later on including Lennie Best (vibraphone); Johnny Burch (piano); and Harvey Weston (bass). Guest vocalists included Elizabeth Welch and Marian Williams. It was during this period that she appeared at the Nice Jazz Festival for the first time.

Stobart was also a regular guest musician on the BBC Radio 1 programme Sounds of Jazz, recorded at the Maida Vale Studios midweek in London in the 1970s, and introduced by Peter Clayton on Sunday evenings.

In 1982, she was the top performer to headline Britain's first women's jazz festival. A major support towards empowering female musicians and, in 1986, she was a guest with Gail Thompson's Gail Force, as well as leading a group with saxophonist Joan Cunningham in the late 1980s. Meanwhile she made guest appearances returning to play in New York with saxophonist Zoot Sims and the expatriate English pianist Marian McPartland. In 1985, she moved to Axmouth, Devon, and set up a student band in Exeter.

From 1992-2004, she re-joined Humphrey Lyttelton Band for the third time and made occasional guest appearances with others. Lyttelton once referred to her "huge, booming sound, imbued with total originality and commanding presence". In 2001, Stobart appeared on stage with Radiohead, along with the Humphrey Lyttleton band, in front of 42,000 fans at the South Park concert in Oxford. During this period she also continued her ongoing teaching, including running her own jazz courses.

In the same year, Stobart tutored saxophone to Dame Judi Dench for her role in the Alan Platter TV play, The Last of the Blonde Bombshells. Stobart continued to play professionally until the age of 82 in 2007.

== Personal life ==
Stobart was married twice. First to Canadian pianist Art Thompson from 1943 to 1951. She and Thompson were married towards the end of the war and worked together, also visiting the US on holiday, where Stobart sat in at Eddie Condon's club in New York. The marriage ended in divorce, when Thompson elected to stay on in north America. She then went on to marry trumpeter Bert Courtley from 1951 until his death, caused by the effects of alcohol and the 'apparent stress caused' working with the Ted Heath Band, aged 40. He died in Croydon, Surrey on 13 September 1969.

Stobart suffered from a stroke in 2011 and died three years later on 6 July 2014, aged 89. She is survived by her three sons with Courtley: David, Peter (bass guitar player) and Paul (saxophone player).

== Bibliography ==
- Leonard Feather and Ira Gitler, The Biographical Encyclopedia of Jazz. Oxford, 1999, pp. 624–625. ISBN 0195074181
