= Full Steam Ahead (album) =

Studio album by Harry Miller's Isipingo
- Released: 2009
- Recorded: 1975–1977
- Studio: London
- Genre: Free jazz
- Label: Reel Recordings; RR012

Harry Miller's Isipingo chronology
Which Way Now (2006)	Full Steam Ahead (2009)

Full Steam Ahead is an album by South African double bassist and composer Harry Miller and his band Isipingo. Featuring five original compositions, it was recorded during 1975–1977 in London, and was released in 2009 by the Canadian label Reel Recordings. On the album, which features several different lineups of the band, Miller is joined by saxophonist Mike Osborne, trumpeters Mark Charig and Mongezi Feza, trombonists Nick Evans, Malcolm Griffiths, and Paul Neiman, pianists Frank Roberts, Keith Tippett, and Stan Tracey, and drummer Louis Moholo. Issued 26 years after Miller's death, Full Steam Ahead was Isipingo's third album.

== Reception ==
Professional ratings
Review scores
Source	Rating
All About Jazz	5/5 stars

In a 5-star review for All About Jazz, Nic Jones stated that "this music can reflect a fundamental joy of life," and commented: "That is, of course, something in itself. It's the best kind of realization to know that these guys could summon it up so easily, even in the face of life's adversities."

Point of Departure's Ed Hazell called the album "some of best music the band ever recorded," and wrote: "The sextet strikes an ideal balance between the melodic warmth and infectious groove of the South African music and the boundary pushing of British free jazz of the period. Miller is a big-hearted composer; he writes inviting melodies over dancing rhythms that the band can use, vary, or overturn as they see fit."

Nate Dorward of Paris Transatlantic remarked: "it's wonderful to have another CD's worth of music from this group, especially since several tracks offer glimpses of previously undocumented permutations of the sextet's lineup." He singled out "Dancing Damon" for praise, noting that it is "taken at a reckless tempo that at times nearly escapes the musicians' grasp."

Writing for The Jazz Mann, Tim Owen stated: "While on one level Miller's compositions act as conduits for democratically apportioned soloing; on another level the song is everything. Key to the Isipingo sound are Louis Moholo's rhythmic ebullience and a balance of earthiness and smoothness across the brass and reeds. Anyone seduced by the Blue Notes should also appreciate these wonderful sessions."

== Track listing ==
Composed by Harry Miller.

1. "When Hey!" – 14:35
2. "Good Heavens Evans!" – 11:58
3. "Family Affair" – 5:59
4. "Children at Play" – 9:26
5. "Dancing Damon" – 9:52

Tracks 1 and 2 were recorded in a London studio during February 1975. Track 3 was recorded in a London studio during 1976. Track 4 was recorded in a London studio during November 1977. Track 5 was recorded live at London ICA on August 15, 1976.

== Personnel ==
- Harry Miller – double bass
- Mike Osborne – alto saxophone
- Mongezi Feza – trumpet (tracks 1, 2)
- Mark Charig – trumpet (tracks 3–5)
- Nick Evans – trombone (tracks 1, 2)
- Malcolm Griffiths – trombone (tracks 3, 4)
- Paul Neiman – trombone (track 5)
- Stan Tracey – piano (tracks 1, 2)
- Keith Tippett – piano (tracks 3, 5)
- Frank Roberts – piano (track 4)
- Louis Moholo – drums
