= In His Good Time =

Live album by Chris McGregor
- Released: 1979
- Recorded: November 18, 1977
- Venue: Palais des Glaces, Paris
- Genre: Jazz
- Label: Ogun; OG 521
- Producer: Chris McGregor, Ron Barron

Chris McGregor chronology
Piano Song Vol. 2 (1977)	In His Good Time (1979)	Grandmothers Teaching (1988)

In His Good Time is a live solo piano album by Chris McGregor. Dedicated to "the ONE who brings all things to be in His Good Time," it was recorded on November 18, 1977, at the Palais des Glaces in Paris, and was released on LP in 1979 by Ogun Records. In 2012, Ogun reissued the album on CD in expanded form, with the first eight tracks presenting the concert's first set as a continuous performance, and the remaining tracks extracted from the second set. The music includes originals, traditional pieces, and tunes composed by McGregor's colleagues Mongezi Feza and Dudu Pukwana.

== Reception ==
Professional ratings
Review scores
Source	Rating
Financial Times	4/5 stars
All About Jazz	3.5/5 stars
Tom Hull – on the Web	B+
The Virgin Encyclopedia of Jazz	3/5 stars

In a review for Financial Times, Mike Hobart stated that the album "confirms what a fine technician and improviser" McGregor was, and noted that the first set "juxtaposes warm-hearted hymns with thoughtful ballads and rampaging swirls with lilting township riffs."

Chris May of All About Jazz wrote: "There is a purity—a straightforward joy—in McGregor's performances, which communicates itself powerfully. The 54-minute first set is played as a continuum... and becomes pleasingly hypnotic."

Point of Departure's John Litweiler commented: "The complex rhythms and hymn harmonies of South African kwela music dance through much of this disc... McGregor is a decorator, an arranger, an inventor of variations, and only secondarily an improviser... This CD is certainly a personal statement by an important artist, and there's pleasure in this music."

The editors of The New York City Jazz Record selected the album as one of 2012's best reissues, and Ken Waxman remarked: "Practically stream-of-consciousness playing... McGregor's well-modulated solid and swinging lines easily reflect his background. Studded with Kwela and ecclesiastical tropes, he's a jazzman with no recourse to the blues. When he doesn't sound as if he's playing for a footstomping religious service or a simple dance, his tremolo muscularity can be linked to the sounds of Herbie Nichols, McCoy Tyner, or, when he breaks into free time contrasting dynamics, early Cecil Taylor."

== LP track listing ==
Track timings not provided.

1. "Call"
2. "Raincloud"
3. "Umhome"
4. "Yikiti"
5. "In His Good Time"
6. "Mngqusho / The Bride / Ududu Nombambula"

== CD track listing ==
1. "Green Hymn" (Chris McGregor) – 7:04
2. "Kwa Tebugo" (Chris McGregor) – 9:25
3. "Sonia" (Mongezi Feza) – 8:47
4. "Call" (Chris McGregor) – 7:40
5. "Raincloud" (Chris McGregor) – 3:06
6. "Umhome" (Traditional, arranged by Chris McGregor) – 9:27
7. "Burning Bush" (Chris McGregor) – 4:51
8. "Shekele" (Traditional, arranged by Chris McGregor) – 5:06
9. "Yikiti" (Chris McGregor) – 4:15
10. "Mngqusho" (Chris McGregor) – 4:07
11. "In His Good Time" (Chris McGregor) – 4:17
12. "The Bride" (Dudu Pukwana) – 2:09
13. "Ududu Nombambula" (Chris McGregor) – 3:09

== Personnel ==
- Chris McGregor – piano
