= Which Way Now =

Live album by Harry Miller's Isipingo
- Released: 2006
- Recorded: November 20, 1975
- Venue: Post-Aula, Bremen, Germany
- Genre: Jazz
- Length: 1:15:10
- Label: Cuneiform; Rune 233

Harry Miller's Isipingo chronology
Family Affair (1977)	Which Way Now (2006)	Full Steam Ahead (2009)

Which Way Now is a live album by South African double bassist and composer Harry Miller and his band Isipingo. Featuring four original compositions, it was recorded on November 20, 1975, at the Post-Aula in Bremen, Germany, and was released in 2006 by Cuneiform Records. On the album, Miller is joined by saxophonist Mike Osborne, trumpeter Mongezi Feza, trombonist Nick Evans, pianist Keith Tippett, and drummer Louis Moholo. Issued 23 years after Miller's death, Which Way Now was Isipingo's second album, following the release of Family Affair (Ogun, 1977) by nearly 30 years.

== Reception ==
Professional ratings
Review scores
Source	Rating
All About Jazz	4/5 stars
All About Jazz	4/5 stars
All About Jazz	4.5/5 stars

In a review for All About Jazz, Jerry D'Souza called the album a "gem," "an energetic, eloquent and exciting experience," and "an outstanding recording and a welcome document of a great band." AAJ's John Kelman described the album as "refreshingly vibrant," and wrote: "Which Way Now is a particularly welcome rescued archival live recording, highlighting Miller's considerable skills as composer and bandleader... [it] is a welcome reminder of just how vibrant the UK improvising scene was—and continues to be." AAJ writer Donald Elfman remarked: "The music is melodic and danceable yet also noisy and rambunctious and it seethes with the energy of its time and a timeless spirit of invention. Miller wrote all the tunes and the creativity never flags—these men sound as if they're creating something important and, amazingly, as if they're having a great time."

The BBC's Peter Marsh stated: "Mongezi Feza's trumpet is agile, focussed and without frills; Mike Osborne's urgent, astringent alto and Nick Evan's sumptuously fat trombone complete the front line. Keith Tippett's piano veers from delicate arpeggios to punchy dissonance, while Miller and drummer Louis Moholo lay down fat, ragged, propulsive grooves that lie somewhere between Mingus and SA township jive... This is an essential document of an under-recorded band."

David Dacks of Exclaim! noted that the "charts are still laced with South African melodic statements but are essentially a showcase for long solo passages," and called Feza "the best soloist in the band," commenting: "Conjuring a wide array of pretty and slurred tones, it's as though he's chewed Don Cherry up and spit him back out again - simply a wonder to listen to."

Writing for Paris Transatlantic, Clifford Allen called the album "one of the finest examples of the South African-European contingent working their cross-continental whiles," and remarked: "let's hope the archives haven’t been cleaned out just yet."

In an article for Dusted Magazine, Bill Meyer noted "the combination of relaxation and vigor that this album's four lengthy performances exude," and stated: "The three-horn front line... takes Miller's composed heads and runs with them, their solos cogent yet free-wheeling... Tippett's piano playing covers a lot of ground, from darkly atmospheric rumbling in the background to fleet, romantic flourishes that take their cues from Miller and... Moholo's swinging rhythms."

Beppe Colli of Clocks and Clouds described the album as "a document of a rare moment in music but whose listening is to be suggested on the grounds of its being of a very high quality. Which, for once, goes hand-in-and with the music being quite accessible."

== Track listing ==
Composed by Harry Miller.

1. "Family Affair" – 19:04
2. "Children at Play" – 20:37
3. "Eli's Song" – 20:49
4. "Which Way Now" – 14:43

== Personnel ==
- Harry Miller – double bass
- Mike Osborne – alto saxophone
- Mongezi Feza – trumpet
- Nick Evans – trombone
- Keith Tippett – piano
- Louis Moholo – drums
