= Khumbula =

Khumbula (Remember)

Studio album by Louis Moholo-Moholo and Stan Tracey
- Released: 2005
- Recorded: October 23, 2004
- Studio: Gateway Studios, Kingston, England
- Genre: Free jazz
- Label: Ogun; OGCD 016
- Producer: Evan Parker

Louis Moholo-Moholo chronology
Mpumi (2002)	Khumbula (Remember) (2005)	Spirits Rejoice! (2006)

Khumbula (Remember) is an album by drummer Louis Moholo-Moholo and pianist Stan Tracey. It was recorded on October 23, 2004, at Gateway Studios in Kingston, England, and was released in 2005 by Ogun Records.

Prior to the recording session, Moholo-Moholo and Tracey had not played together for thirty years, and had never performed as a duo. According to Tracey, there was no planning involved: "we just went in and started playing. There were no words at all concerning the music that passed between the two of us. The red light went on and we started playing."

== Reception ==
Professional ratings
Review scores
Source	Rating
The Penguin Guide to Jazz	3.5/4 stars
All About Jazz	4/5 stars
The Guardian	4/5 stars
Tom Hull – on the Web	A−

The authors of The Penguin Guide to Jazz Recordings called the album "an astonishing performance, and one of Moholo's most instantly approachable records." They wrote: "from the first notes... the chemistry is assured and strong."

John Eyles of All About Jazz stated that the musicians "sound as if they have been improvising together all their lives, so fluent is the music," and noted that Moholo-Moholo "retains his ability to turn on a sixpence when required, instantly responding to Tracey, and creating the impression of telepathy."

Writing for The Guardian, John Fordham described the recording as "completely in-the-moment music-making," and remarked: "Tracey sounds at times like a man trying out a punchline on a fellow-conversationalist who barrels on without hearing it... Moholo, by contrast, sustains a hissing, simmering kind of rhythmic trance rather than a groove, depriving Tracey of his usual narrative shapes. But the pianist responds to the challenge with typically economical ingenuity."

== Track listing ==
1. "Molo (Hello) Afrika - Later Europe" – 5:01
2. "Links" – 3:50
3. "Landela (Follow)" – 6:31
4. "Shapes" – 5:56
5. "Plurality" – 7:22
6. "Musicale" – 13:17
7. "Very Urgent" – 7:43
8. "Goduka" – 10:59

== Personnel ==
- Stan Tracey – piano
- Louis Moholo – drums, percussion
