= Bremen to Bridgwater =

Live album by Chris McGregor's Brotherhood of Breath
- Released: 2004
- Recorded: June 20, 1971; February 26, 1975; November 11, 1975
- Venue: Bremen, Germany; Bridgwater, England
- Genre: Free jazz
- Length: 2:36:52
- Label: Cuneiform; Rune 182/183

Brotherhood of Breath chronology
Travelling Somewhere (2001)	Bremen to Bridgwater (2004)	Eclipse at Dawn (2008)

Bremen to Bridgwater is a double-CD live album by South African pianist and composer Chris McGregor's big band Brotherhood of Breath. It was recorded in 1971 and 1975 in Bremen, Germany, and Bridgwater, England, and was released on CD by Cuneiform Records in 2004.

== Reception ==
Professional ratings
Review scores
Source	Rating
AllMusic	4/5 stars

In a review for AllMusic, William Tilland wrote: "fierce, joyous collective energy is a common denominator throughout. Music from all three concerts should cause not only the toes to tap but also the feet to stomp. On evidence of these recordings, the Brotherhood of Breath is a band that many listeners will still be happy to journey with for however long the journey takes."

Russell Carlson of JazzTimes stated that the album is "full of worthy jams... an intriguing history lesson," and commented: "I've come to call the band's sound 'African Dixieland'-guys blowing like mad with a rousing, uplifting spirit over driving, danceable beats."

Writing for All About Jazz, Rex Butters remarked: "Bremen to Bridgewater presents avant gardists who get funky and know their roots without giving up flight... The Brotherhood of Breath created a bracing mix of jazz styles, not just coexisting, but readily getting sweaty together." AAJ's Jerry D'Souza wrote: "What is exemplary is the way the course is charted for the musicians. The ensemble is tight and... there is the open vent for a soloist to slide into and to crag with some free enterprise... Each track fashions its own nugget."

In an article for the BBC, Peter Marsh stated: "This is glorious, joyous, fierce music, and a testament to the departed spirits of some of the most creative musicians you're likely to hear on record (or anywhere else). Absolutely essential."

Dusted Magazine's Derek Taylor commented: "McGregor pilots each performance like a ship's captain self-assured of both his own talents and those of his mates. His premature death in 1990 to lung cancer seems all the more lamentable given the promise on display in these joyous performances."

Beppe Colli of Clocks and Clouds described the album as "indispensable," noting that it "presents different (and complementary) aspects of the group's history," and praising the "beautiful ensemble work" and "fine musical ideas."

Dan Warburton, writing for Paris Transatlantic, stated that the album features "tough, rough, wondrously life-affirming music," and wrote: "Nowadays... bands like the Brotherhood... don't exist anymore. So you'd better get your butt down to your local emporium and buy up all available copies of Bremen To Bridgewater right now. You won't regret it."

== Track listing ==
Disc 1

1. "Funky Boots March" (Gary Windo, Nick Evans) – 3:06
2. "Kongi's Theme" (Chris McGregor) – 11:12
3. "Now" (Chris McGregor) – 14:08
4. "The Bride" (Dudu Pukwana) – 7:32
5. "Think of Something" (Mike Osborne) – 5:49
6. "Union Special" (Chris McGregor) – 1:11
7. "Andromeda" (Chris McGregor) – 4:09
8. "Do It" (Chris McGregor) – 3:33
9. "The Serpent's Kindly Eye" (Chris McGregor) – 19:26
10. "Untitled Original" (Mike Osborne) – 9:21

Disc 2

1. "Sonia" (Mongezi Feza) – 12:37
2. "Now" (Chris McGregor) – 13:24
3. "Yes, Please" (Radu Malfatti) – 11:19
4. "Restless" (Chris McGregor) – 7:26
5. "Kwhalo" (Dudu Pukwana) – 16:17
6. "Untitled Original" (Chris McGregor) – 16:23
- Tracks 1–1 to 1–8 were recorded on June 20, 1971, at Lila Eule, Bremen, Germany. Tracks 1–9 to 1–10 were recorded on February 26, 1975, at the Bridgwater Arts Centre, Bridgwater, England. Tracks 2–1 to 2–6 were recorded on November 11, 1975, at the Bridgwater Arts Centre, Bridgwater, England.

== Personnel ==
- Chris McGregor – leader, piano
- Dudu Pukwana – alto saxophone
- Elton Dean – alto saxophone (disc 1, tracks 9–10; disc 2, tracks 1–6)
- Mike Osborne – alto saxophone, clarinet
- Bruce Grant – baritone saxophone (disc 2, tracks 1–6)
- Alan Skidmore – tenor saxophone (disc 1, tracks 1–10)
- Gary Windo – tenor saxophone (disc 1, tracks 1–8)
- Evan Parker – tenor saxophone, soprano saxophone (disc 2, tracks 1–6)
- Harry Beckett – trumpet
- Marc Charig – trumpet
- Mongezi Feza – trumpet
- Malcolm Griffiths – trombone (disc 1, tracks 1–10)
- Nick Evans – trombone
- Radu Malfatti – trombone (disc 2, tracks 1–6)
- Harry Miller – bass
- Louis Moholo – drums (disc 1, tracks 1–8; disc 2, tracks 1–6)
- Keith Bailey – drums (disc 1, tracks 9–10)
