= Eclipse at Dawn =

Live album by Chris McGregor's Brotherhood of Breath
- Released: 2008
- Recorded: November 4, 1971
- Venue: Berliner Jazztage, Berliner Philharmonie, Germany
- Genre: Free jazz
- Length: 1:04:10
- Label: Cuneiform; RUNE 262

Brotherhood of Breath chronology
Bremen to Bridgwater (2004)	Eclipse at Dawn (2008)

Eclipse at Dawn is a live album by South African pianist and composer Chris McGregor's big band Brotherhood of Breath. It was recorded on November 4, 1971, at the Berliner Jazztage in Berlin, and was released on CD by Cuneiform Records in 2008.

== Reception ==
Professional ratings
Review scores
Source	Rating
All About Jazz	5/5 stars
All About Jazz	4/5 stars

A reviewer for Aquarium Drunkard described the album as "the melding of personal and musical histories," and wrote: "the group seamlessly weaves its influences into large numbers. By turns Afro-pop, bebop and calypso, the group reaches towards the wildest extremes of free jazz only to coalesce in Gershwin-esque swings."

Nic Jones of All About Jazz stated: "As an affirmation of life the music is almost tensile and joys of every order are celebrated here. Join in with that celebration and proclaim it from the rooftops while you're at it." AAJ's Jerry D'Souza commented: "The music is vigorous, exciting and downright engaging. And that's what the Brotherhood of Breath was all about." Clifford Allen remarked: "If there is a 'benchmark' Brotherhood performance this might be it, bookended by the coagulation of slick dance band saxophone lines, brilliant trumpet call and gooey, plastic rhythm of 'Nick Tete' and the ubiquitous rejoinder of 'Funky Boots March.'" Andrey Henkin noted: "There is no other large ensemble that veered so easily between Ellington Swing, Sun Ra bombast and Globe Unity chaos mongering, often within the same song."

Writing for the Washington City Paper, Brent Burton called the album "great stuff," and stated that it is "surprisingly well-recorded and features the 12-piece band in all of its freewheeling, Mingus-meets-the-townships glory."

Exclaim!'s David Dacks wrote: "the band's energy is unstoppable. They veer from Ellington-ian swing and South African kwela melodies to Ayler-inspired freedom at the drop of a hat, and Louis Moholo's frantic drumming adds a Keith Moon-like intensity to everything."

In an article for Point of Departure, Ed Hazell commented: "The Brotherhood's idea of playing an arrangement was closer to Sun Ra's than George Russell's. They don’t play a chart so much as gather around it and play it as they please... Thirty-five years after the fact, the Brotherhood of Breath's fusion of musics sounds not just brilliantly alive and joyful, but positively prescient."

== Track listing ==
1. "Introduction by Ronnie Scott" – 0:56
2. "Nick Tete" (Dudu Pukwana) – 7:59
3. "Restless" (Chris McGregor) – 11:56
4. "Do It" (Chris McGregor) – 7:22
5. "Eclipse at Dawn" (Abdullah Ibrahim) – 7:23
6. "The Bride" (Dudu Pukwana) – 15:36
7. "Now" (Chris McGregor) – 8:40
8. "Funky Boots March" (Gary Windo, Nick Evans) – 1:46
9. "Ronnie Scott and Chris McGregor Sendoff and Applause" – 2:32

== Personnel ==
- Chris McGregor – leader, piano
- Dudu Pukwana – alto saxophone
- Mike Osborne – alto saxophone
- Alan Skidmore – tenor saxophone
- Gary Windo – tenor saxophone
- Harry Beckett – trumpet
- Marc Charig – trumpet
- Malcolm Griffiths – trombone
- Nick Evans – trombone
- Harry Miller – bass
- Louis Moholo – drums

== Charts ==
Chart performance for Eclipse at Dawn
Chart (2026)	Peak position
UK Album Downloads (Official Charts)	61
UK Jazz & Blues Albums (Official Charts)	23
