= Hopper Tunity Box =

Studio album by Hugh Hopper
- Released: 1977
- Recorded: May–July 1976
- Studios: Mobile Mobile Studios, London
- Genre: Jazz fusion
- Length: 41:05
- Labels: Compendium Records, Cuneiform Records (USA re-issue)
- Producers: Mike Dunne, Hugh Hopper

Hugh Hopper chronology
Cruel But Fair (1976)	Hopper Tunity Box (1977)	Rogue Element (1978)

Professional ratings
Review scores
Source	Rating
AllMusic	4.5/5 stars

Hopper Tunity Box is a 1977 album by jazz/rock musician Hugh Hopper, in which the ex-Soft Machine bassist augments his fuzz-bass style by performing on guitar, recorders, soprano sax, and percussion. The album, recorded in 1976 and re-released on CD by Culture Press in 1996 and Cuneiform Records in 2007, features fellow Soft Machine bandmate, saxophonist Elton Dean, along with other notable musicians.

== History ==
Around 1975 Hugh Hopper began to gather together musical ideas that he had been working on since leaving Soft Machine in 1973, often snatches of tunes that for the most part had not previously seen the light of day. His friend, recording engineer Mike Dunne, who had been assistant engineer on his first solo record, 1984 (CBS, 1973), and who was now in charge of the mobile studio of Jon Anderson of Yes, suggested they co-produce a record together; he would provide the studio and Hopper would provide the music and musicians.

By the time Hopper had arranged the music into some sort of coherent order and invited along the various guest musicians, Dunne's studio was set up in one of London's big film sound studios, where Yes rehearsed for tours. Jon Anderson occasionally visited when they were working at some tricky tape-looping or double-speeded bass, and Steve Howe looked in once, Hopper seems to remember. He knew them slightly, from Soft Machine tours when the two bands came together at festivals.

Hopper thinks they took about two weeks to get most of the music recorded. For all but one of the tracks, he started by laying down bass with an old-fashioned, wind-up metronome click-track. Then Mike Travis added drums for all of the tracks except "Mobile Mobile", which featured Nigel Morris, Hopper's old bandmate from Isotope. (After the record came out, both drummers said they preferred the sound that the other drummer got down on tape.) The only time Hopper actually played alongside any of the other musicians was on "Crumble", when Travis and he laid down the rhythm track together. Then Dave Stewart added Hammond organ and oscillator sounds. Next Gary Windo introduced his honking sax and blowing foghorns on "Miniluv". Hopper traded him sessions for the bass he had recently played on his "Steam Radio" project, which finally came out many years later as His Masters Bones (Cuneiform Records, 1996). Frank Roberts added some Fender Rhodes piano and, lastly, Elton Dean and Marc Charig played on "The Lonely Sea and the Sky".

== Critical reception ==
After the record came out on the Norwegian Compendium Records label, it had mostly good reviews, except one in an ultraconservative British jazz magazine, where the reviewer said: "it had all the subtlety of a stone [14 pounds] of King Edwards (potatoes) tumbling downstairs and all the melodic and harmonic interest of a trapped wasp... not a jazz record..."

== Track listing ==
All pieces were written by Hugh Hopper, except where noted.

Side A
No.	Title	Length
1.	"Hopper Tunity Box"	3:35
2.	"Miniluv"	3:34
3.	"Gnat Prong"	7:58
4.	"The Lonely Sea and the Sky"	6:39

Side B
No.	Title	Writer(s)	Length
1.	"Crumble"		3:54
2.	"Lonely Woman"	Ornette Coleman	3:22
3.	"Mobile Mobile"		5:03
4.	"Spanish Knee"		3:50
5.	"Oyster Perpetual"		3:10

=== Hopper Tunity Box (1974) ===
The theme is played by multitracked descant and tenor recorders (about 12 descant and two tenor tracks) over a riff of electric organ, electric piano and double-tracked bass. Double-speed fuzz bass then plays Hopper Tunes and quotes until an alien tune brings in Dave Stewart's weird tone-generators.

== Personnel ==
- Hugh Hopper - bass, guitar, recorders, soprano sax, percussion
- Richard Brunton - guitar (A2, B1)
- Marc Charig - cornet, tenor horn (A4, B2, B4)
- Elton Dean - alto sax, saxello (A4, B2, B4)
- Nigel Morris - drums (B3)
- Frank Roberts - electric piano (A4, B1, B4)
- Dave Stewart - organ, pianet, oscillators (A1, B3)
- Mike Travis - drums (A1, A2, A3, A4, B1, B4)
- Gary Windo - bass clarinet, saxes (A1, A2, B1, B2)
