= Ogun Records =

Jazz record label

- Founded: 1973
- Founder: Harry Miller; Hazel Miller; Keith Beal
- Genre: Avant-garde jazz
- Country of origin: UK
- Location: London

Ogun Records is a jazz record label created in London in 1973 by South African expatriate bassist Harry Miller, his wife Hazel Miller, and sound engineer Keith Beal. They recorded British avant-garde jazz musicians Keith Tippett, Mike Osborne, Elton Dean, Lol Coxhill, Harry Beckett, Trevor Watts and their collaborations with expatriate South Africans, including the Blue Notes, Chris McGregor, Dudu Pukwana, Mongezi Feza, Louis Moholo, and Johnny Dyani in groups like McGregor's Brotherhood of Breath, Dean's Ninesense, and Miller's Isipingo.

The label did not have any releases for several years, beginning in 1980, during which the Millers lived in the Netherlands. Harry Miller was killed in a car accident in 1983. Hazel Miller started releasing new titles on LP in 1986, with help from John Jack of Cadillac Records, and in 1990 switched the format of releases to CD starting with Elton Dean's Unlimited Saxophone Company. Since then, almost every year has seen one to three new additions to the CD catalog. Most are new or unreleased recordings, and some are CD editions of the earlier LP releases.

== Discography ==
=== LP ===
Number	Performer	Title	Year
OG 100	Brotherhood of Breath	Live at Willisau	1974
OG 200	Harry Miller	Children at Play	1974
OG 300	Mike Osborne Trio	Border Crossing	1974
OG 400	S.O.S.: Alan Skidmore/Mike Osborne/John Surman	SOS	1975
OG 500	Irene Schweizer/Rüdiger Carl/Radu Malfatti/Harry Miller/Paul Lovens	Ramifications	1975
OG 600	Ovary Lodge: Keith Tippett/Julie Tippetts/Harry Miller/Frank Perry	Ovary Lodge: Live at Nettlefold Hall	1976
OG 700	Mike Osborne Trio	All Night Long. The Willisau Concert	1976
OG 800	Harry Beckett's Joy Unlimited	Memories of Bacares	1976
OG 900	Elton Dean's Ninesense	Oh! for the Edge	1976
OG 010	Nicra: Nick Evans/Radu Malfatti/Keith Tippett/Buschi Niebergall/Makaya Ntshoko	Listen/Hear	1977
OG 110	Voice: Julie Tippetts/Maggie Nichols/Phil Minton/Brian Eley	Voice	1977
OG 210	Mike Osborne/Stan Tracey	Tandem	1977
OG 310	Harry Miller's Isipingo	Family Affair	1977
OG 410	EDQ: Elton Dean/Keith Tippett/Chris Laurence/Louis Moholo	They All Be on This Old Road	1977
OG 510	Lol Coxhill	Diverse	1977
OG 610	Elton Dean/Joe Gallivan/Kenny Wheeler	The Cheque Is in the Mail	1977
OG 710	Mark Charig with Keith Tippett & Ann Winter	Pipedream - Pipedream	1977
OG 810	Mike Osborne Quintet	Marcel's Muse	1977
OG 910	Elton Dean's Ninesense	Happy Daze	1977
OG 020	Harry Beckett's Joy Unlimited	Got It Made	1977
OG 120	John Stevens/Evan Parker	The Longest Night Vol. 1	1978
OG 220	The Blue Notes	Blue Notes in Concert Volume 1	1978
OG 320	Radu Malfatti/Harry Miller	Bracknell Breakdown	1978
OG 420	John Stevens/Evan Parker	The Longest Night Vol. 2	1978
OG 520	Louis Moholo Octet	Spirits Rejoice!	1978
OG 521	Chris McGregor	In His Good Time	1979
OG 522	Charles Austin/Roy Babbington/Joe Gallivan	Home from Home	1979
OG 523	Harry Miller	In Conference	1978
OG 524	Brotherhood of Breath	Procession (Live at Toulouse)	1978
OG 525	Lol Coxhill	The Joy of Paranoia	1978
OG 526	Trevor Watts String Ensemble	Cynosure	1978
OG 527	Soft Head: Hugh Hopper/Elton Dean/Alan Gowen/Dave Sheen	Rogue Element	1978
OG 528	Trevor Watts' Amalgam	Closer to You	1979
OG 529	The Trio: John Surman/Barre Phillips/Stu Martin	By Contact	1987 reissue of 1971 Japanese Columbia LP
OG 530	Elton Dean/Harry Beckett/Nick Evans/Marcio Mattos/Liam Genockey	The Bologna Tape	1985
OG 531	Paul Rutherford Trio	Bracknell '83	1986
OG 532	The Blue Notes: Chris McGregor/Dudu Pukwana/Louis Moholo	Blue Notes for Johnny	1987 release
OG 533	Louis Moholo Viva-la-Black	Viva-La-Black	1988
OGD 001/002	The Blue Notes	Blue Notes for Mongezi	1976
OGD 003/004	Keith Tippett's Ark	Frames: Music for an Imaginary Film	1978
OGD 007/008	Keith Tippett Septet	A Loose Kite in a Gentle Wind Floating With Only My Will for an Anchor	1986

=== CD ===
Number	Performer	Title	Year
Ogun OGCD 001	Chris McGregor's Brotherhood of Breath	Live at Willisau	1994
Ogun OGCD 002	Elton Dean	Unlimited Saxophone Company	1990
Ogun OGCD 003 A	Louis Moholo	Viva-La-Black Exile	1991
Ogun OGCD 003 B	Louis Moholo	Viva-La-Black Exile (remaster)	2011
Ogun OGCD 005	John Stevens/Evan Parker	Corner to Corner	1995
Ogun OGCD 006	Louis Moholo's Viva-La-Black	Freedom Tour 1993 Live in South Africa	1994
Ogun OGCD 007	The Blue Notes	Legacy: Live in South Afrika 1964	1995
Ogun OGCD 008	Lol Coxhill	Coxhill on Ogun: The Joy of Paranoia/Diverse	1998
Ogun OGCD 009	Louis Moholo/Evan Parker/Barry Guy/Pule Pheto/Gibo Pheto	Bush Fire	1996
Ogun OGCD 010/011	Keith Tippett's Ark	Frames: Music for an Imaginary Film	1996
Ogun OGCD 012	Francine Luce	Bò kay la vi-a	1999
Ogun OGCD 013	Soft Head: Hugh Hopper/Elton Dean/Alan Gowen/Dave Sheen	Rogue Element: Expanded Edition	1996
Ogun OGCD 014	Louis Moholo/Pule Pheto/Mervyn Africa/Keith Tippett	Mpumi	2002
Ogun OGCD 015	Mike Osborne Trio & Quintet	2004	
Ogun OGCD 016	Louis Moholo/Stan Tracey	Khumbula (Remember)	2005
Ogun OGCD 017/018	Louis Moholo	Bra Louis Bra Tebs/Spirits Rejoice!	2005
Ogun OGCD 019	S.O.S.: Alan Skidmore/Mike Osborne/John Surman	SOS	2006
Ogun OGCD 020	Keith Tippett/Julie Tippetts/Louis Moholo/Canto Generàl	Viva La Black Live at Ruvo Jazz Festival	2007
Ogun OGCD 021	Ovary Lodge: Keith Tippett/Julie Tippetts/Harry Miller/Frank Perry	Ovary Lodge: Live at Nettlefold Hall	2007
Ogun OGCD 022/023	John Stevens/Evan Parker	Corner to Corner + The Longest Night vols. 1 & 2	2007
Ogun OGCD 024–028	The Blue Notes	The Ogun Collection: compilation; contains Legacy Live in South Afrika 1964, Blue Notes for Mongezi (expanded), Blue Notes in Concert (expanded), and Blue Notes for Johnny (expanded)	2008
Ogun OGCD 029	Mike Osborne Trio	All Night Long	2008
Ogun OGCD 030	Keith Tippett Septet	A Loose Kite in a Gentle Wind Floating With Only My Will for an Anchor	2009
Ogun OGCD 031	Louis Moholo Unit	An Open Letter to My Wife Mpumi	2009
Ogun OGCD 032	Elton Dean's Ninesense	Happy Daze/Oh! For the Edge	2009
Ogun OGCD 033	Mark Charig with Keith Tippett & Ann Winter	Pipedream	2010
Ogun OGCD 034	Couple in Spirit: Keith & Julie Tippett	Live at the Purcell Room	2010
Ogun OGCD 035	Louis Moholo/Dudu Pukwana/Johnny Dyani/Rev. Frank Wright	Spiritual Knowledge and Grace	2011
Ogun OGCD 036	Keith Tippett Octet	From Granite to Wind	2011
Ogun OGCD 037	The Blue Notes	Before the Wind Changes: Live in Waregem 1979	2012
Ogun OGCD 038	Chris McGregor	In His Good Time: Expanded Edition	2012
Ogun OGCD 039	Alexander Hawkins & Louis Moholo	Keep Your Heart Straight	2012
Ogun OGCD 040	Chris McGregor's Brotherhood of Breath	Procession (Live at Toulouse): Expanded Edition	2013
Ogun OGCD 041	Harry Miller's Isipingo	Different Times, Different Places: 1973/1976	2013
Ogun OGCD 042	Louis Moholo-Moholo Unit	For the Blue Notes	2014
Ogun OGCD 043	Louis Moholo-Moholo Quartet	4 Blokes	2014
Ogun OGCD 044	Canto Generàl Featuring Louis Moholo-Moholo	Rebel Flames	2015
Ogun OGCD 045	Harry Miller's Isipingo	Different Times, Different Places: Volume 2	2016
Ogun OGCD 046	Elton Dean Quintet	Welcomet (Live in Brazil, 1986)	2017
Ogun OGCD 047	Louis Moholo-Moholo's Five Blokes	Uplift the People	2018
Ogun OGCD 048	Elton Dean Quartet	They All Be On This Old Road	2021
Ogun OGCD 101	The Dedication Orchestra	Spirits Rejoice	1992
Ogun OGCD 102/103	The Dedication Orchestra	Ixesha (Time)	1994
Ogun HMCD 1/2/3	Harry Miller	1941-1983 The Collection: Children at Play/Family Affair/Bracknell Breakdown/In Conference/Down South	1999

== See also ==
- List of record labels
