= Manfred Mann Chapter Three Volume Two =

Studio album by Manfred Mann Chapter Three
- Released: 23 October 1970
- Recorded: 1970
- Studio: Maximum Sound Studios, Old Kent Road, London
- Genre: Jazz rock, hard rock, progressive rock
- Length: 43:37
- Label: Vertigo (UK original release); Cohesion (UK 1993, 1999 reissues); Polydor (U.S.); Bronze (Germany 1979 reissue)
- Producer: Manfred Mann; Mike Hugg; Dave Hatfield

Manfred Mann chronology
Manfred Mann Chapter Three (1969)	Manfred Mann Chapter Three Volume Two (1970)	Manfred Mann's Earth Band (1972)

Professional ratings
Review scores
Source	Rating
Allmusic	3.0/5 stars

Manfred Mann Chapter Three Volume Two is the second and final album released by Manfred Mann Chapter Three. It was released in 1970 on Vertigo. Mann's next album, and most of his future albums, would be released under the name Manfred Mann's Earth Band.

== Track listing ==
Tracks written by Mike Hugg except where noted

=== Side one ===
1. "Lady Ace" – 7:58
2. "I Ain't Laughing" – 2:36
3. "Poor Sad Sue" – 5:54
4. "Jump Before You Think" – 4:52
5. "It's Good To Be Alive" (Manfred Mann) – 3:31

=== Side two ===
6. "Happy Being Me" – 15:54
7. "Virginia" (Mann) – 4:52

=== Bonus Tracks (1999 CD re-issue) ===
8. "I Ain't Laughing" (single mono version) – 2:32
9. "Happy Being Me" (single mono version) – 4:01
10. "Virginia" (alternate version) (Mann) – 3:32

== Personnel ==
=== Manfred Mann Chapter Three ===
- Mike Hugg – vocals, acoustic and electric piano, arranger
- Manfred Mann – organ, arranger
- Steve York – electric bass, acoustic bass
- Bernie Living – alto saxophone
- Brian John Hugg – acoustic guitar (tracks 2,6), backing vocals
- Craig Collinge – drums

=== Additional musicians ===
- Dave Brooks – tenor saxophone
- Clive Stevens – soprano saxophone, tenor saxophone
- Sonny Corbett – trumpet
- David Coxhill – baritone saxophone
- Andy McCulloch - drums (track 5)

=== Technical ===
- Mike Hugg – producer
- Manfred Mann – producer
- Dave Hadfield – producer, engineer
- Derek Wadsworth – brass arrangements
- Mike Gibbs – brass arrangements
- Keith MacMillan – design, photography
- Re-mastered by: Robert Corich and Mike Brown
