= Manfred Mann Chapter Three (album) =

Studio album by Manfred Mann Chapter Three
- Released: 7 November 1969
- Recorded: June – October 1969
- Studio: Maximum Sound Studios, London
- Genre: Jazz rock, progressive rock
- Length: 50:10 (original); 68:25 (bonus track)
- Label: Vertigo (UK original release); Bronze (UK 1980 reissue); Cohesion (UK 1993 reissue); Polydor (U.S.); Fontana (Australia)
- Producer: Manfred Mann

Manfred Mann Chapter Three chronology
| Mighty Garvey! (1968) | Manfred Mann Chapter Three (1969) | Manfred Mann Chapter Three Volume Two (1970) |

Alternative cover
- Manfred Mann Chapter Three (US version)

Professional ratings
Review scores
| Source | Rating |
|---|---|
| Allmusic | 4.0/5 stars |
| Christgau's Record Guide | C+ |

Manfred Mann Chapter Three is the debut album released in 1969 by Manfred Mann Chapter Three. It was one of the first three albums released on the Vertigo record label. The principal members of the group were Manfred Mann and Mike Hugg. Mann played the organ and acted as the group's musical arranger, whilst Hugg handled vocals, played piano and was the chief songwriter. The group was augmented by a five-piece brass section and several distinguished jazz soloists.

The core songs "Travelling Lady", "Snakeskin Garter", "Devil Woman", and "Time" define the album's sound: long, slow, doomy one chord riffs beneath sections of breathy vocals, powerful brass and free-form improvised solos. "Konekuf" is the same without the vocals, while "A Study in Inaccuracy" is simply freeform. "Sometimes", "One Way Glass", "Ain't It Sad" and "Where Am I Going" are shorter and more melodic, wistful songs centering on Hugg's electric piano, on which he turns in an able solo on "Mister, You're a Better Man Than I".

The title of the instrumental "Konekuf" was Manfred Mann's slightly obscured reaction to Enoch Powell's infamous Rivers of Blood speech about immigration. (Manfred had left his home of South Africa for several reasons, but the country's institutionalized racism was definitely among them.) The musical theme would later re-appear as the middle part of the title track on the third Earth Band album Messin'. Likewise, "One Way Glass" was re-recorded in a more rock-oriented version on the second Earth Band album Glorified Magnified. The song also appeared with a different title and lyric ("Broken-Glass Lives") on the soundtrack of the film Swedish Fly Girls, recorded in 1969 by Chapter Three (although the film wasn't released until 1972). Chapter Three's version of "One Way Glass" was sampled by The Prodigy in their song "Stand Up", and Manfred himself played keyboard over this recording and included the result on Lone Arranger. Another song with connections to other parts of Mann's history is "Travelling Lady"; this song had previously been recorded by Manfred Mann the group and released on the b-side of their final single "Ragamuffin Man", then simply called "A 'B' Side".

== Track listing ==
Tracks written by Mike Hugg except noted

=== Side one ===
1. "Travelling Lady" (Manfred Mann, Hugg) (Lead vocals: Mike Hugg) – 5:48
2. "Snakeskin Garter" (Lead vocals: Mike Hugg) – 5:48
3. "Konekuf" (Mann) (Lead vocals: Mike Hugg) – 5:47
4. "Sometimes" (Lead vocals: Mike Hugg) – 2:37
5. "Devil Woman" (Lead vocals: Mike Hugg) – 5:24

=== Side two ===
6. "Time" (Lead vocals: Mike Hugg) – 7:25
7. "One Way Glass" (Mann, Peter Thomas) (Lead vocals: Manfred Mann) – 3:33
8. "Mister You're a Better Man Than I" (Mike Hugg, Brian Hugg, Mann) (Lead vocals: Mike Hugg) – 5:10
9. "Ain't It Sad" (Lead vocals: Mike Hugg) – 1:57
10. "A Study in Inaccuracy" (Lead vocals: Mike Hugg) (Mann) – 4:05
11. "Where Am I Going" (Lead vocals: Mike Hugg) – 2:36

=== Additional tracks (1999 CD re-issue) ===
12. "Sometimes" (single mono version) – 2:22
13. "Travelling Lady" (single mono version) (Mann, Hugg) – 5:20
14. "Devil Woman" (single version) – 5:23
15. "A Study in Inaccuracy" (alternative version) – 5:10

== Personnel ==
Manfred Mann Chapter Three

- Manfred Mann – organ, police whistle, arranger, backing vocals, lead vocals on "One Way Glass"
- Mike Hugg – piano, lead vocals on all tracks except “One Way Glass”, arranger
- Bernie Living – alto saxophone, flute
- Steve York – bass guitar, electric guitar, harp
- Craig Collinge – drums

Wind section

- Clive Stevens – tenor saxophone
- Carl Griffiths – tenor saxophone
- Dave Coxhill – baritone saxophone
- Gerald Drewett – trombone
- Sonny Corbett – trumpet

Guest musicians

- Brian John Hugg – acoustic guitar
- Harry Beckett – trumpet on "Time"
- Sue and Sunny – backing vocals on "Devil Woman"

=== Technical ===
- Dave Hadfield – producer, engineer
- Derek Wadsworth – brass arrangements
- Luke Weall – art direction, design
- Jack Levy – cover art
- Re-mastered by: Robert M Corich and Mike Brown
