= Mike Osborne =

British jazz musician

- Born: Michael Evans Osborne; 28 September 1941; Hereford, England
- Died: 19 September 2007 (aged 65) Hereford, England
- Genre: Jazz
- Occupation: Musician
- Instruments: Saxophone, piano, clarinet
- Years active: 1962–1982
- Labels: Ogun, Cadillac

Michael Evans Osborne (28 September 1941 – 19 September 2007) was an English jazz alto saxophonist, pianist, and clarinetist who was a member of the band Brotherhood of Breath in the 1960s and 1970s.

== Biography ==
Mike Osborne was born in Hereford, England, and attended Wycliffe College in Gloucestershire and the Guildhall School of Music. From 1962 to 1972, Osborne belonged to the Mike Westbrook band. During this period the artist also worked with musicians such as Michael Gibbs, Mike Cooper, Stan Tracey, Kenny Wheeler, Humphrey Lyttelton, Alan Skidmore, John Surman, Harry Miller, Alan Jackson (drums), John Mumford (trombone) and Lionel Grigson. During 1974–75, Osborne was part of the saxophone trio S.O.S. with John Surman and Alan Skidmore. They recorded an LP plus BBC radio and television sessions and toured extensively in Europe.

Health issues hastened the end of his career in 1982, and he returned to Hereford, where he was living under care at the time of his death in 2007, aged 65, from lung cancer.

== Select discography ==
- Mike Osborne Quintet: Outback (Turtle); with Chris McGregor (piano), Harry Miller (bass), and Louis Moholo (drums)
- Mike Osborne Trio: Border Crossing (Ogun)
- Mike Osborne Trio: All Night Long (Live at Willisau) (Ogun)
- Mike Osborne & Stan Tracey: Original (Cadillac)
- Mike Osborne Force of Nature (REEL)
- Mike Osborne/Stan Tracey Duo (Cadillac)
- Tandem: Mike Osborne/Stan Tracey Live at the Bracknell Festival (Ogun)
- Mike Osborne Quintet: Marcel's Muse (Ogun)
- Shapes (Future Music)

With Brotherhood of Breath

- Chris McGregor's Brotherhood of Breath (Neon)
- Procession (Live at Toulouse) (Ogun)
- Travelling Somewhere (Cuneiform)
- Bremen to Bridgwater (Cuneiform)
- Eclipse at Dawn (Cuneiform)

With Barry Guy/London Jazz Composers' Orchestra

- Ode (Incus, 1972)

With John Surman

- John Surman (Deram)
- How Many Clouds Can You See? (Deram)

With John Surman and Alan Skidmore

- SOS (1975) (Ogun)

With Mike Westbrook

- The Mike Westbrook Concert Band: Marching Song Vols. 1 & 2 (Deram)
- The Mike Westbrook Concert Band: Release (Deram)

With Michael Gibbs

- Michael Gibbs (Deram)

With Selwyn Lissack & Friendship Next Of Kin

- Facets Of The Univers (Goody)

With Ric Colbeck

- The Sun Is Coming Up (Fontana)

With Mike Cooper

- Too Late Now (Dawn)
- Your Lovely Ways (Dawn)
- Life and Death in Paradise (Fresh Air)

With Alan Skidmore

- Alan Skidmore Quintet: T.C.B. (Philips)

With Kenny Wheeler

- Song for Someone (Incus, 1973)

With Harry Miller

- Family Affair (Ogun, 1977)
- Which Way Now: Live in Bremen 1975 (Cuneiform, 2006) recorded in 1975
- Full Steam Ahead (Reel Recordings, 2009) recorded during 1975–1977
- Different Times, Different Places (Ogun, 2013) recorded during 1973–1976

With Norma Winstone

- Edge of Time (Algo)

== Select bibliography ==
- Ian Carr: Music Outside: Contemporary Jazz in Britain, 2nd edition (London: Northway Publications, 2007) ISBN 978-0-9550908-6-8
