= Brotherhood of Breath =

English-South African big band

- Origin: London, England
- Genres: Jazz; Big band Free jazz
- Years active: 1960s–1970s; 1987–1989
- Past members: Chris McGregor; Louis Moholo; Harry Miller; Mongezi Feza; Dudu Pukwana; Johnny Dyani; Lol Coxhill; Evan Parker; Paul Rutherford; Harry Beckett; Marc Charig; Alan Skidmore; Jim Dvorak; Mike Osborne; Elton Dean; Nick Evans; John Surman; François Jeanneau; Louis Sclavis; Didier Levallet; Annie Whitehead

The Brotherhood of Breath was an English-South African big band established in the late-1960s by South African pianist and composer Chris McGregor, an extension of McGregor's previous band, The Blue Notes.

== History ==
The Brotherhood of Breath included many members of the South African expatriate community resident in London, including McGregor himself, Louis Moholo, Harry Miller, Mongezi Feza, Dudu Pukwana, (occasionally) Johnny Dyani; and many of the free jazz musicians who were based in London at the same time. The group included, at various stages, Lol Coxhill, Evan Parker, Paul Rutherford, Harry Beckett, Marc Charig, Alan Skidmore, Jim Dvorak, Mike Osborne, Elton Dean, Nick Evans, and John Surman. The personnel was fluid, depending on who was available. The music resembles a mixture of Charles Mingus and the experiments of Sun Ra, but retains a unique feel due to the South African influences and the intelligent arrangements.

The original Brotherhood Of Breath ended in the late-1970s, with the deaths of Mongezi Feza and Harry Miller (whose label, Ogun Records, released some of the Brotherhood's albums). McGregor formed a second version of the group in France in the early-1980s, adding European musicians, including a number of French jazz musicians (François Jeanneau, Louis Sclavis, Jean-Claude Montredon, Didier Levallet).

== Discography ==
- Chris McGregor's Brotherhood of Breath (RCA Neon, 1971)
- Eclipse at Dawn (1971; Cuneiform Rune, 2008)
- Brotherhood (RCA, 1972)
- Bremen to Bridgwater (1971/1975; Cuneiform Rune, 2004)
- Travelling Somewhere (1973; Cuneiform Rune, 2001)
- Live at Willisau (Ogun, 1974)
- Procession (Ogun, 1978)
- Yes Please (In and Out, 1981)
- Country Cooking (Venture, 1988)
- En Concert a Banlieues Bleues with Archie Shepp (52e Rue Est, 1989)
- In Memoriam (ITM, 1994) also released as The Memorial Concert

== Bibliography ==
- Maxine McGregor: Chris McGregor and the Brotherhood of Breath: my life with a South African jazz pioneer. Bamberger Books, Flint, MI 1995; ISBN 0-917453-32-8
