= Keith Tippett =

British jazz pianist and composer (1947–2020)

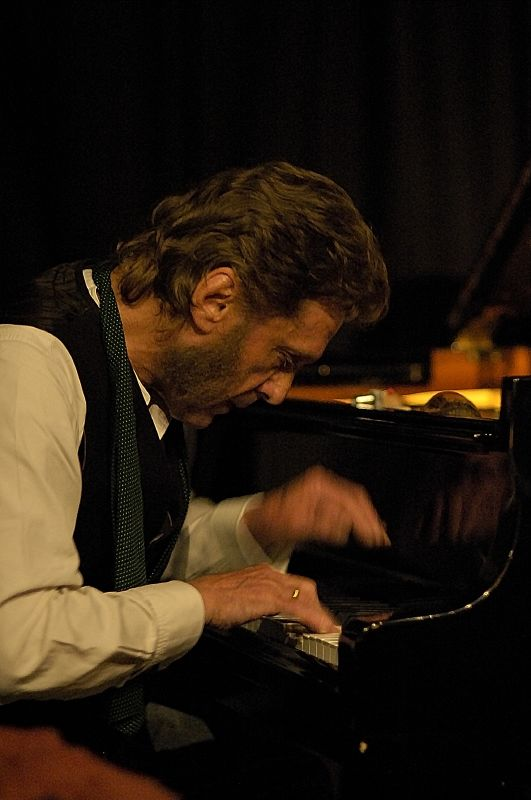
- Tippett in 2007

Background information
- Born: Keith Graham Tippetts; 25 August 1947; Bristol, England
- Died: 14 June 2020 (aged 72)
- Genres: Jazz; free jazz; free improvisation; pop; rock; progressive rock
- Occupation: Musician
- Instruments: Piano, keyboards
- Years active: 1969–2020
- Labels: RCA Victor, FMP, Ogun
- Spouse: Julie Driscoll (m. 1970)

Keith Graham Tippetts (25 August 1947 – 14 June 2020), known professionally as Keith Tippett, was a British jazz pianist and composer. According to AllMusic, Tippett's career "...spanned jazz-rock, progressive rock, improvised and contemporary music, as well as modern jazz for more than half-a-century". He held "an unparallelled place in British contemporary music," and was known for "his unique approach to improvisation". Tippett appeared and recorded in many settings, including a duet with Stan Tracey, duets with his wife Julie Tippetts (née Driscoll), solo performances, and as a bandleader.

== Early life ==
Born in Southmead, Bristol, England, Tippett was the son of an English father who was a policeman and an Irish mother named Kitty. He wrote music dedicated to her after she died. He was the oldest of three siblings and went to Greenway Secondary Modern school in Southmead. As a child he played piano, church organ, cornet, and tenor horn. At fourteen he formed his first band, KT Trad Lads, with school friends Richard Murch, Mike Milton, Terry Pratt, and Bob Chard, and Eric Condell performing traditional jazz. He formed a modern jazz trio in Bristol and played regularly at the Dugout Club in Park Row, Bristol.

== Music career ==
In 1967, Tippett moved to London to pursue a career in music, taking menial jobs while performing in jazz clubs. With a scholarship he attended the Barry Summer School Jazz Course in Wales, where he met Elton Dean, Nick Evans, and Marc Charig and with them started a band. The Keith Tippett Sextet was hired for a residency at the 100 Club in Oxford Street, leading to a contract with Polydor, which released their first two albums, You Are There... I Am Here (1970) and Dedicated to You, but You Weren't Listening (1971).

After leaving Vertigo, Tippett formed Centipede, a 50-piece band that included his wife Julie Driscoll, and brought together much of a generation of young British jazz and rock musicians. As well as performing some concerts (limited economically by the size of the band), they recorded one double-album, Septober Energy, a Tippett composition, which was released on the RCA label in 1971. Despite substantial publicity, the album failed to sell in sufficient numbers to justify the expense of maintaining the project.

In early 1970, Tippett was part of a temporary King Crimson line-up for the recording of their second album In the Wake of Poseidon. He also contributed as a session musician to the band's subsequent two albums Lizard later in 1970 and Islands in 1971.

For his next album as a leader, Blueprint (1972), he used a smaller group comprising himself and Julie Tippetts with bassist Roy Babbington and drummer Frank Perry. The band then expanded slightly to become Ovary Lodge, who recorded two albums, one for RCA and a second for the Ogun label. Tippett and his band also recorded in the 1970s for Giorgio Gomelsky's label, Utopia, releasing the Julie Tippetts album, Sunset Glow. Tippett continued to play with various combinations of musicians through the 1970s, playing improvisational jazz and jazz-rock with such musicians as Stan Tracey, Robert Wyatt, Dudu Pukwana, Harry Miller, Elton Dean, Hugh Hopper, and Louis Moholo. From 1979, he also started to release many live albums of solo piano performances, beginning with The Unlonely Raindancer.

In the late 1980s, he, along with Paul Dunmall saxes, Paul Rogers bass, and Tony Levin drums, formed the quartet Mujician, playing purely improvised jazz. Mujician released six albums between 1990 and 2002. He also formed a trio with Julie Tippetts and Willi Kellers, and wrote film and television scores. He also wrote music for string quartets and piano, and taught at summer schools. Tippett also continued to record and to tour in Britain and Europe with various ensembles. He also worked with musicians Andy Sheppard, as well as with his frequent collaborators Elton Dean, Louis Moholo, and Howard Riley.

In Bristol, starting in 1989 and continuing through the 1990s, he started the Seedbed Orchestra, which performed at venues including the Thekla, the Arnolfini and Bristol Old Vic. This enabled beginners, amateurs and professional musicians to play in a large ensemble and was "emblematic of his quest to unite music of all types in a non-elitist, open to all, friendly environment free of establishment restrictions." He became a "musician's musician when he first set up the Seedbed Orchestra where many Bristol musicians could benefit from his guidance."

== Personal life and death ==
He married singer Julie Driscoll in 1970.

In 2018, he had a heart attack and pneumonia but returned to performing in 2019.

He died on 14 June 2020 at the age of 72.

In 2026, the Authorised biography, “ Keith Tippett: Mujician”, written by Martin Phillips with a Foreword by Richard Williams, was published by Jazz In Britain.

== Discography ==
=== As leader ===
- You Are Here... I Am There (Polydor, 1970)
- Dedicated to You but You Weren't Listening (Vertigo, 1971)
- Septober Energy with Centipede (RCA 1971)
- Blueprint (RCA Victor, 1972)
- Ovary Lodge (RCA Victor, 1973) (different album than the 1976 release with the same name; with Roy Babbington and Frank Perry)
- Ovary Lodge (Ogun, 1976) (different album than the 1973 release with the same name; with Julie Tippetts, Frank Perry, and Harry Miller)
- TNT with Stan Tracey (Emanem, 1976)
- Cruel but Fair with Hugh Hopper, Elton Dean, Gallivan (Compendium, 1976)
- Warm Spirits Cool Spirits (Vinyl, 1977)
- Frames (Ogun, 1978)
- The Unlonely Raindancer (Universe, 1980)
- Mujician (FMP, 1982)
- No Gossip with Louis Moholo (FMP, 1982)
- Tern with Louis Moholo (FMP, 1983)
- In Focus with Howard Riley (Affinity, 1985)
- Mercy Dash with Hugh Hopper, Elton Dean (Culture Press, 1985)
- A Loose Kite in a Gentle Wind Floating with Only My Will for an Anchor (Ogun, 1986)
- Low Flying Aircraft (Red Hot, 1987)
- Mujician II (FMP, 1987)
- Couple in Spirit with Julie Tippett (EG, 1988)
- Mujician III (August Air) (FMP, 1989)
- Mr. Invisible and the Drunken Sheilas (FMP, 1989)
- 66 Shades of Lipstick with Andy Sheppard (EG, 1990)
- The Dartington Concert (EG, 1992)
- The Bern Concert with Howard Riley (FMR, 1994)
- Une Croix Dans L'Ocean (Victo, 1995)
- Twilight Etchings (FMP, 1996)
- Wild Silk with Peter Fairclough (ASC, 1996)
- Couple in Spirit II with Julie Tippett (ASC, 1997)
- Friday the 13th (Nrl, 1997)
- The First Full Turn with RoTToR (Paul Rutherford, Julie Tippett, Keith Tippett, Paul Rogers) (Emanem, 1998)
- Linuckea (FMR, 2000)
- First Encounter with Howard Riley (Jazzprint, 2001)
- Imago with Peter Fairclough (Jazzprint, 2003)
- Another Part of the Story with Howard Riley (Emanem, 2003)
- Pianoforte with Howard Riley (Slam, 2004)
- Mahogany Rain with Julie Tippetts (DUNS, 2005)
- Dartington Improvising Trio Live at the Priory with Julie Tippetts (FMR, 2005)
- Live at Le Mans (Red Eye Music, 2007)
- Viva La Black Live at Ruvo with Julie Tippetts (Ogun, 2007)
- Supernova with Stan Tracey (Resteamed, 2008)
- Nostalgia 77 Sessions Featuring Keith & Julie Tippett (Tru Thoughts, 2009)
- Live at the Purcell Room (Ogun, 2010)
- From Granite to Wind (Ogun, 2011)
- Two for Joyce (Long Song, 2013)
- Mujician Solo IV - Live in Piacenza (Dark Companion, 2015)
- The Nine Dances of Patrick O'Gonogon (Discus, 2016)
- Four Quartets with Jackson, Long, Taylor (Confront, 2016)
- Live in Triest (Klopotec, 2018)
- A Mid Autumn Night's Dream with Julie Tippetts, Lino Capra Vaccina and Paolo Tofani (Dark Companion, 2019)
- Noise in Your Eye with Adrian Chivers, Daniel Pennie (April 2020)
- The Monk Watches The Eagle (Discus, 2020)
- Aeolian with Matthew Bourne, (Discus, 2021)
- Music For Labyrinths with Roberto Musci and Claudio Gabbiani) (Dark Companion, 2024)

=== As band member or sideman ===
With Company

- Epiphany (Incus, 1982)
- Epiphanies I-VI (Honest Jon's, 2019)
- Epiphanies VII-XIII (Honest Jon's, 2019)

With Elton Dean

- Oh! for the Edge (Ogun, 1976)
- They All Be on This Old Road (Ogun, 1977)
- Happy Daze (Ogun, 1977)
- Boundaries (Japo, 1980)
- Duos (Elton Dean Tapes, 1988)
- Trios (Elton Dean Tapes, 1989)
- The Vortex Tapes (Slam, 1992)
- Two's and Three's (Voiceprint, 1995)
- Bladik (Cuneiform, 1997)
- Live at The BBC (Hux, 2003)
- Ninesense Suite (Jazzwerkstatt, 2011)

With Paul Dunmall

- Desire and Liberation (Slam, 1997)
- Bebop Starburst (Cuneiform, 1999)
- Onosante (DUNS, 2000)
- The Great Divide (Cuneiform, 2001)
- Bridging (Clean Feed, 2003)
- I Wish You Peace (Cuneiform, 2004)

With King Crimson

- In the Wake of Poseidon (Island, 1970)
- Lizard (Island, 1970)
- Islands (Island, 1971)

With Harry Miller

- Family Affair (Ogun, 1977)
- In Conference (Ogun, 1978)
- Which Way Now (Cuneiform, 2006)
- Full Steam Ahead (Reel, 2009)
- Different Times, Different Places (Ogun, 2013)
- Different Times Different Places Vol. Two (Ogun, 2016)

With Mujician

- The Journey (Cuneiform, 1990)
- Poem About the Hero (Cuneiform, 1994)
- Birdman (Cuneiform, 1996)
- Colours Fulfilled (Cuneiform, 1998)
- Spacetime (Cuneiform, 2002)
- There's No Going Back Now (Cuneiform, 2006)

With others

- Arthur Brown, Dance (Gull, 1975)
- Harry Beckett, Passion and Possession (ITM, 1991)
- Mark Charig, Pipedream (Ogun, 1977)
- Keith Christmas, Fable of the Wings (B & C, 1970)
- Julie Driscoll, 1969 (Polydor, 1971)
- Dennis Gonzalez, Catechism (Daagnim, 1988)
- Jack Lancaster & Robin Lumley, Peter and the Wolf (RSO, 1975)
- Iain Matthews , If You Saw Thro' My Eyes (Vertigo, 1971)
- Harold McNair, The Fence (B & C, 1970)
- Louis Moholo, Spirits Rejoice! (Ogun, 1978)
- Louis Moholo, Mpumi (Ogun, 2002)
- Shelagh McDonald, Album (Polydor, 1970)
- Dudu Pukwana, Diamond Express (Arista, 1977)
- Dudu Pukwana, Black Horse (1201 Music, 2012)
- Daryl Runswick, Set of 5 (ASC, 2000)
- Peter Sinfield, Still (Manticore, 1973)
- David Sylvian, Everything and Nothing (Virgin, 2000)
- Julie Tippetts, Sunset Glow (Utopia, 1975)
- Toyah, Ophelia's Shadow (Demon, 1991)
- Working Week, Fire in the Mountain (10 Records, 1989)
- Larry Stabbins, Louis Moholo, Live in Foggia (Ogun, 2025)
