= Alan Skidmore =

English jazz saxophonist

- Born: Alan Richard James Skidmore; 21 April 1942 (age 84); London, England
- Genres: Jazz
- Occupation: Musician
- Instrument: Saxophone
- Years active: 1950s–present
- Website: alanskidmore.info

Alan Richard James Skidmore (born 21 April 1942) is an English jazz tenor saxophonist, and the son of saxophonist Jimmy Skidmore.

== Career ==
He was born in London, England. Skidmore began his professional career in his teens, and early in his career he toured with comedian Tony Hancock. In the 1960s, he began frequently appearing with the BBC Radio Big Band, then worked with Alexis Korner, John Mayall, and Ronnie Scott. Commissioned by the BBC in order to represent the UK at the Montreux Jazz Festival, Skidmore formed a group with Harry Miller, Tony Oxley, John Taylor, and Kenny Wheeler. This group won three of six awards at Montreux, following which Skidmore was invited to record an album of the group's performances, forming the basis for Once Upon a Time. In the early 1970s, he started a saxophone-only band with John Surman and Mike Osborne. He has also worked with Mose Allison, Kate Bush, Elton Dean, Georgie Fame, Mike Gibbs, George Gruntz, Elvin Jones, Van Morrison, Stan Tracey, Charlie Watts, and Mike Westbrook.

== Discography ==
- Once upon a Time (Deram Records DN11/SDN11, issued 1970)
- TCB (Philips 6308 041, recorded 21 October 1970)
- Chris McGregor's Brotherhood of Breath (RCA/Neon, 1971)
- Jazz in Britain '68–69 with John Surman, Tony Oxley (Decca Eclipse ECS 2114, 1972, previously unreleased masters recorded at various sessions in 1968 and 1969)
- SOS with John Surman and Mike Osborne (Ogun, recorded Worthing, 9–11 February 1975)
- El Skid with Elton Dean, Chris Laurence, John Marshall (Vinyl Records, recorded Riverside Studios, 25–26 February 1977)
- European Jazz Quintet - Live at the Moers Festival (Ring-Moers 01018, recorded Moers, Germany, 29 May 1977)
- European Jazz Quintet (EGO, 1978)
- S.O.H. with Tony Oxley, Ali Haurand (EGO, 1979)
- S.O.H. with Tony Oxley, Ali Haurand (View Records VS 0018, Neuss, Germany, 25 April 1981)
- European Jazz Quintet III (Fusion, 1982)
- Tribute to Trane (Miles Music, recorded London, 18–19 February 1988)
- East To West with Stan Tracey (Miles Music MM 081CD, recorded Hong Kong, 1989, and Ronnie Scott's, London, February 1992)
- After the Rain (with string orchestra) (Miles Music 1998)
- The Call (Provocateur PVC 1018, Cape Town, April 1999 and London, May 1999)
- Ubizo (Provocateur PVC 1036, ca.2002)
- Bremen to Bridgwater with Chris McGregor's Brotherhood of Breath (Cuneiform, 2004) recorded in 1971 and 1975
- S.O.H. Live in London (Jazzwerkstatt, 2007)
- Eclipse at Dawn with Chris McGregor's Brotherhood of Breath (Cuneiform, 2008) recorded in 1971
- Jazz Live Trio with Kenny Wheeler (TCB, 2012)
- Alan Skidmore's Tenor Tonic - That's Our Life with Paul Dunmall, Tony Levin, Paul Rogers (Jazz In Britain, 2026), live and studio recordings 1985
