= Harry Miller (jazz bassist) =

South African jazz double bassist

Harold Simon Miller
- Born: 25 April 1941; Cape Town, South Africa
- Died: 16 December 1983 (Aged 42)
- Occupations: Musician, Composer

Harold Simon Miller (25 April 1941 – 16 December 1983) was a South African jazz double bassist, who lived for most of his adulthood in England.

== Biography ==
A native of Cape Town, South Africa, Miller began his career playing bass for the rock group Manfred Mann. After settling in London, he became part of a groups of musicians in the 1960s and 1970s who combined free jazz with the music of South Africa. He recorded with Elton Dean, Chris McGregor, Louis Moholo, John Surman, Keith Tippett, and Mike Westbrook, and also led his own band, Isipingo, named after a vacation spot in South Africa. At the end of the 1970s, he moved to the Netherlands for economic reasons and worked with musicians in Willem Breuker's circle. In 1971, he made a guest appearance on the album Islands, by the progressive rock band King Crimson. He and his wife founded Ogun Records.

Miller died in a car crash in the Netherlands in 1983.

== Discography ==
- Chris McGregor's Brotherhood of Breath (RCA/Neon, 1970 [1971])
- Children at Play (Ogun, 1974)
- In the Townships (Caroline, 1974) with Dudu Pukwana and Spear
- Live at Willisau with Chris McGregor's Brotherhood of Breath (Ogun, 1974)
- Ramifications with Irène Schweizer (Ogun, 1975)
- Family Affair (Ogun, 1977)
- In Conference (Ogun, 1978)
- Bracknell Breakdown with Radu Malfatti (Ogun, 1978)
- Procession (Live at Toulouse) with Chris McGregor's Brotherhood of Breath (Ogun, 1978)
- The Nearer the Bone, the Sweeter the Meat with Peter Brötzmann (FMP, 1979)
- Opened, But Hardly Touched with Peter Brötzmann (FMP, 1981)
- Zwecknagel with Radu Malfatti (FMP, 1981)
- Berlin 'Bones with Andreas Boje, Thomas Wiedermann, Manfred Kussatz (FMP, 1981)
- Alarm with Peter Brötzmann (FMP, 1983)
- Travelling Somewhere with Chris McGregor's Brotherhood of Breath (Cuneiform, 2001)
- Bremen to Bridgwater with Chris McGregor's Brotherhood of Breath (Cuneiform, 2004)
- Which Way Now (Cuneiform, 2006)
- Brötzmann & Miller (Corbett vs. Dempsey, 2007)
- Eclipse at Dawn with Chris McGregor's Brotherhood Of Breath (Cuneiform, 2008)
- Full Steam Ahead (Reel, 2009)
- Ninesense Suite with Elton Dean (Jazzwerkstatt, 2011)
- The Birmingham Jazz Concert with Mike Osborne, Tony Levin (Cadillac, 2012)
- Different Times, Different Places (Ogun, 2013)
- Different Times, Different Places Volume Two (Ogun, 2016)
