= Olie Brice =

British musician

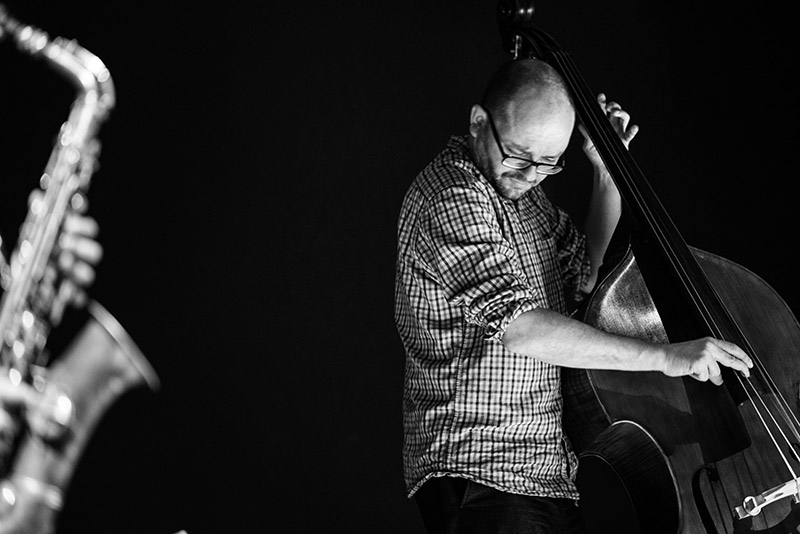

Background information
- Born: June 8, 1981 (age 44); London
- Occupation: Musician
- Website: oliebrice.com

Olie Brice (born 8 June 1981) is a British double bassist, improviser and composer. He is bandleader of the Olie Brice Quintet, the Olie Brice Trio, and the Olie Brice Octet (some of which include Mike Fletcher and Jason Yarde). Brice has been a member of the Nick Malcolm Quartet, Mike Fletcher Trio, Alex Ward Quintet, Paul Dunmall Brass Project, Loz Speyer's Inner Space, as well as collaborated with Dee Byrne, Tobias Delius, and Binker Golding.

== Personal life ==
Brice was born in east London, raised in Hackney and Jerusalem, and now lives in Hastings.

== Discography ==
=== Olie Brice Quintet ===
- Immune to Clockwork (Multikulti, 2014) – with Mark Hanslip, Alex Bonney, Waclaw Zimpel, and Jeff Williams
- Day After Day (Babel, 2017) – with George Crowley, Mike Fletcher, Alex Bonney, and Jeff Williams

=== Olie Brice Trio / Octet ===
- Fire Hills (West Hill, 2022) – one disc is Olie Brice Trio (Brice with Tom Challenger and Will Glaser); one disc is Olie Brice Octet (Brice with Johnny Hunter, Alex Bonney, Kim Macari, Jason Yarde, George Crowley, Rachel Musson, and Cath Roberts)

=== Other collaborations ===
- Brackish (FMR, 2011) – with Neil Metcalfe
- Glimmers by Nick Malcolm Quartet (FMR, 2012) – Brice, Nick Malcolm, Alexander Hawkins, and Mark Whitlam
- Beyond These Voices by Nick Malcolm Quartet (Green Eyes, 2014) – Brice, Nick Malcolm, Alexander Hawkins, and Mark Whitlam
- Nick of Time (Slam, 2014) – with Mike Fletcher and Tymek Jozwiak
- Vuelta by Mike Fletcher Trio (Stoney Lane, 2015) – Brice, Mike Fletcher and Jeff Williams
- Somersaults (Two Rivers, 2015) – with Mark Sanders and Tobias Delius
- Glass Shelves and Floor by Alex Ward Quintet (Copepod, 2015) – Brice, Alex Ward, Hannah Marshall, Rachel Musson, Julie Kjaer, and Tom Jackson
- New Era by Entropi (F-ire, 2015) – Brice, Dee Byrne, Andre Canniere, Matt Fisher, and Rebecca Nash
- Projected / Entities / Removal by Alex Ward Trios & Sextet (Copepod, 2015) – Brice, Alex Ward, Tom Jackson, Rachel Musson, Hannah Marshall, and Steve Noble
- Of Tides (Babel, 2016) – with Achim Kaufmann, recorded live at Vortex Jazz Club
- Maha Samadhi by Paul Dunmall Brass Project (Slam, 2016) – Brice, Dunmall, Tony Bianco, Percy Pursglove, Aaron Diaz, Alex Astbury, Dave Sear, Josh Tagg, Josh Palmer, Jo Sweet, and Ed Bennett
- Life on the Edge by Loz Speyer's Inner Space (Leo, 2017) – Brice, Loz Speyer, Chris Biscoe, Rachel Musson, and Gary Willcox
- Moment Frozen by Dee Byrne's Entropi (Whirlwind, 2017) – Brice, Byrne, Andre Canniere, Matt Fisher, and Rebecca Nash
- Numerology of Birdsong (West Hill, 2019) – with Mark Sanders and Tobias Delius as Somersaults
- Real Isn't Real by Nick Malcolm Quartet (Green Eyes, 2019) – Brice, Nick Malcolm, Alexander Hawkins, Ric Yarborough, and with vocals by Emily Wright, Marie Lister, Josienne Clarke, and Lauren Kinsella
- Unnavigable Tributaries (MultiKulti, 2020) – with Luis Vicente and Mark Sanders
- Palindromes (West Hill, 2021) – with Paul Dunmall, Percy Pursglove, and Jeff Williams
- The Secret Handshake with Danger vol. one (577, 2021) – with Binker Golding, Henry Kaiser, N.O Moore, and Eddie Prévost
- Conduits (Relative Pitch, 2022) – with Cath Roberts
- The Laughing Stone (Confront, 2023) – with Paul Dunmall
- Outlines by Dee Byrne (Whirlwind, 2023) – with Byrne, Andrew Lisle, Nick Malcolm, Rebecca Nash, and Tom Ward
- Divisions (Discus, 2023) – with Johnny Hunter and Mark Hanslip
- Immense Blue (West Hill, 2024) – with Rachel Musson and Mark Sanders
