= Dee Byrne =

British musician

Dee Byrne is a British saxophonist, composer and improviser working in contemporary jazz, avant-garde and free improvisation. She lives in London.

== Biography ==
Byrne is from Gravesend, Kent. She now lives in London, where she graduated from Trinity Laban Conservatoire of Music and Dance with a Masters in Jazz Performance in 2011. She released two albums with her quintet Entropi before forming her current sextet Outlines. She is listed as having performed with Beats & Pieces Big Band in the past.

== Discography ==
=== As Entropi ===
- New Era (F-ire, 2015) – with Olie Brice, Andre Canniere, Matt Fisher, and Rebecca Nash
- Moment Frozen (Whirlwind, 2017) – with Brice, Canniere, Fisher, and Nash

=== As Dee Byrne ===
- Outlines (Whirlwind, 2023) – with Olie Brice, Andrew Lisle, Nick Malcolm, Rebecca Nash, and Tom Ward

=== Other collaborations ===
- Disembark! (Luminous, 2020) – with Cath Roberts
- Going Down The Well (Unit Records, 2020) – with MoonMot
- Motherboard Pinball (Efpi, 2021) – with Oli Kuster and Cyrill Ferrari
- Live at Cafe Oto (Luminous, 2022) – solo album
- Algorithmic Quotidian (Efpi, 2022) – with Oli Kuster and Cyrill Ferrari
- 350 Million Herring (Enja, 2023) – with MoonMot

=== As band member ===
- Lumumba (Intakt, 2022) – with Clemens Kuratle Ydivide
- Live in Leipzig (Spherical, 2024) – with Loz Speyer's Inner Space
- The Default (Intakt, 2025) – with Clemens Kuratle Ydivide
