= Wu Hen =

Studio album by Kamaal Williams
- Released: 24 July 2020
- Genres: Jazz; hip-hop; R&B; EDM
- Length: 42:38
- Label: Black Focus
- Producer: Kamaal Williams

Kamaal Williams chronology
DJ-Kicks: Kamaal Williams (2019)	Wu Hen (2020)	Stings (2023)

Wu Hen is the second studio album by English musician Kamaal Williams, released on 24 July 2020 under his Black Focus label. It is considered to define Williams' own genre "Wu Funk", a blend of jazz, hip-hop, contemporary R&B and EDM. Other styles explored include funk, acid jazz, traditional jazz, breakbeat and house music.

The album was announced simultaneously with the premiere of "One More Time" in May 2020; and was followed by "Hold On" in June and "Mr. Wu" in July. The second of the three tracks features the singer Lauren Faith. Wu Hen received generally favourable reviews from music critics, some praising Williams' drift from the sounds of its predecessor, Black Focus (2016), that informed him in his career with Yussef Kamaal, while others said the album's ideas shifted too urgently. In the United Kingdom, it reached number 2 on the Jazz & Blues Albums Chart and number 15 on the Independent Albums Chart.

== Background and recording ==
"This is a revolution of the mind. A spiritual rebellion: to reach new heights requires separating ourselves from the material world and finding power in what's intangible[…] If you're painting, it's what you're feeling as you're painting. And the person looking at that artwork or listening to that music, they can feel it too, because it's sincere."

— Williams talking about the album, 2020

Wu Hen is named after the nickname Williams' maternal grandmother gave him and is a nod to his lineage as a descendant of the Wu Dynasty. Williams intended to name the album "Wu Han" but changed it to "Wu Hen" to avoid stigma from the COVID-19 pandemic. The tracks "Toulouse" and "Pigalle" are named after real-life locations in France, while "1989" is named after the year of Williams' birth and "Big Rick" after the bassist Rick Leon James, who played on the album.

Apple Music wrote that Wu Hen "spills over with movement and humor, with playful skits and snapshots of the characters around Williams' life". Williams said that it is "ultimately about understanding that there is a higher entity behind the creation of the universe". He also expressed his desire to "'represent' in the face of hate" with the album, regarding the rise of xenophobic attacks against East Asian communities due to the pandemic. Its guest musicians consist of Miguel Atwood-Ferguson for strings, Quinn Mason on saxophone, drummer Greg Paul, James on bass and harpist Alina Bzhezhinska. Haitian rapper Mach-Hommy was announced to perform on Wu Hen, but did not appear in the final mix. Recording was finished in Morocco on 13 April 2020, in lock-down isolation.

== Composition ==
Wu Hen is considered to be part of William's own genre of jazz, hip-hop, R&B and EDM which he dubs "Wu Funk". Jack Bray of The Line of Best Fit classified the album as a jazz record, but stated that it experiments with genres, "Wu Hen could be an R&B album, it could be funk the next minute and then a house or breakbeat track the next minute". Bray continued that "there's a spectral 'big-band' quality which creeps across the album" with its strings and harp, "whilst, on the other hand there's also a delicate intimacy and closeness afforded through the crisp drum patterns and whinnying saxophone".

"Pigalle"
A 30-second sample of "Pigalle", a post-bop track that features "propulsive" saxophone playing.

"Mr. Wu"
A 21-second sample of "Mr. Wu". Williams said that the track recalls his earlier club music releases and considered its "four-to-floor beat" as his signature sound.

Wu Hen begins with the string intro "Street Dreams", where Bzhezhinska plays the harp, followed by Mason on saxophone and then Atwood-Ferguson on strings. The track "juxtaposes Ravel's Afternoon of a Faun with bluesy, John Klemmer-esque tenor wailing from Mason before a modal Middle Eastern string interlude carries it out". Williams does not play on the track, but he added that "it still sounds like me". This is followed by "One More Time", a breakbeat track with "fitfully incessant drumming" from Paul and "synth chord patterns that function as rhythm, harmony, and textured tones for Mason's brisk post-bop tenor solo". The third track "1989" is a slow funk song with strings, where James' bass "becomes the primary instrument" that "alternat[es] between finger-style playing and rather aggressively thumped notes". "Toulouse" is a "gently galloping" track that has "strings alternating between sound-library lushness and staccato plucking in the offbeat spaces between Williams'’ syncopated piano". The fifth track "Pigalle" takes a more traditional approach to jazz, being compared to the material of John Coltrane. The first half of the track sees "Williams' emphatic chording leading the charge and James' frenetic walking following suit", which soon underscores "propulsive" saxophone playing from Mason. The song becomes subdued in its second half by Williams' piano sololing and Mason's playing as "a lingering afterthought".

The sixth track "Big Rick" was said to have the "smoother elements of Headhunters-era Herbie Hancock" with its bass playing that was compared to Paul Jackson Jr. "Save Me" continues the same concept, but is "kicked up a few notches". It channels the acid jazz sounds of Jamiroquai, and "unfurls in a series of sputtering bits of saxophone and synth", with Paul having "more abstract, almost avant-garde fills". The song was meant to feature Mach-Hommy, who did not make the final cut. The eighth track "Mr. Wu" is a house song that has "neon-synths", an eight bar interlude by Mason and drums "finding syncopation in every corner of the beat". "Hold On" is a soul track that features vocalist Lauren Faith and has "wobbly synth and drifting piano chords" and harp. The song's lyrics are written by Williams, and are about the "universal principles of life: some people say karma, others destiny or faith…and some people say coincidence. These are all the same thing to me, except I don't say coincidence." Wu Hen closes with "First Prayer", consisting of two chord synths and "Mason's lyrical soloing".

== Release and reception ==
On 26 May 2020, Wu Hen was announced for release, coinciding with the premiere of "One More Time", followed by "Hold On" on 24 June, and "Mr. Wu" on 21 July. The album was issued on 24 July 2020 under Williams' label Black Focus Records. In the United Kingdom, it reached number 2 on the Jazz & Blues Albums Chart, and number 15 on the Independent Albums Chart. Wu Hen entered the Scottish Singles Chart at number 64.

=== Critical response ===
Professional ratings
Aggregate scores
Source	Rating
Metacritic	80/100
Review scores
Source	Rating
AllMusic	4/5 stars
Crack	6/10
The Guardian	3/5 stars
The Line of Best Fit	8/10
Loud and Quiet	9/10
Mojo	4/5 stars
The Observer	4/5 stars
Pitchfork	7.3
Q	4/5 stars
Uncut	8/10

Wu Hen was met with generally favourable reviews from music critics. At Metacritic, which assigns a weighted average rating out of 100 to reviews from mainstream publications, the album received an average score of 80, based on 8 reviews. Critics noted the maturity of Williams in the album, and considered it his proper debut, which drifted from the sound in his previous albums The Return (2018) and Black Focus (2016). Kate Hutchinson of The Observer commented: "Williams has always coolly evaded categorisation, whether DJing house as Henry Wu or making spectral slow jams and here [he succeeds at] reconcil[ing] those guises." Andrew Sacher of BrooklynVegan wrote that "there's still enough classic-style jazz on Wu Hen to refer to it as a jazz album, but it's a jazz album that finds kinship with artists like Flying Lotus and Thundercat, not traditional acoustic jazz combos". A critic of The Wire praised the album's strings on "Toulouse" and "1989", adding that they "suggest[ed] a Xanaxed Roy Ayers recording for CTI in the mid-70s".

Writing for The Guardian, Ammar Kalia opined that Williams had been unable to develop his own style since the end of his partnership with Yussef Dayes as Yussef Kamaal, but believed him "taking on the driving force of 1950s jazz could hold the key to Williams' independent development – one which would rely on him honing his keyboard skills to convince as a bandleader, rather than just a producer". Other critics felt that the ideas of Wu Hen were unfocused because of its constant stylistic shifts, with Andy Beta of Pitchfork saying the album "feel[s] fidgety" in this manner, "hurriedly racing off to somewhere different rather than lingering and deepening its focus."

=== Year-end lists ===
Wu Hen ranked at number 19 on Rough Trade Records' year end list for 2020. The album was ranked at number 24 for Passion of the Weiss, with Dean van Nguyen writing: "Wu Hen manages to not only spotlight its creator’s musicianship and skills as an arranger, but also encapsulate the diverse London jazz scene that he cruises." It ranked at number 45 for Piccadilly Records', and number 44 for Deluxe magazine's year end lists.

== Track listing ==
All tracks are written by Kamaal Williams, credited as Henry Wu.

Wu Hen track listing
No.	Title	Length
1.	"Street Dreams"	2:13
2.	"One More Time"	3:10
3.	"1989"	3:22
4.	"Toulouse"	2:48
5.	"Pigalle"	6:14
6.	"Big Rick"	3:27
7.	"Save Me"	5:58
8.	"Mr. Wu"	3:37
9.	"Hold On"	3:20
10.	"Early Prayer"	4:57
Total length:		42:38

Japanese edition (bonus track)
No.	Title	Length
11.	"3 Yourself"	2:49
Total length:		45:37

== Personnel ==
Credits for Wu Hen adapted from album liner notes.

- Kamaal Williams (Note: Production credited as Henry Wu) – rhodes piano, synth, production
- Zaineb Abelque – photography
- Miguel Atwood-Ferguson – strings, additional writing
- Alina Bzhezhinska – harp
- Jackson Cantor – design
- K Dubs – ad-libs
- Lauren Faith – vocals (9)
- Othelo Gervacio – painting
- Mach-Hommy – vocals (Note: Not present in the album, albeit credited.)
- Syed Adam Jaffrey – recording and mixing
- Rick James – electric bass, additional writing
- Quinn Mason – saxophone, additional writing
- Greg Paul – drums, additional writing
- Stirlos – ad-libs
- Beau Thomas – mastering
- Wbeeza – ad-libs

== Charts ==
Chart performance for Wu Hen
Chart (2020)	Peak position
Scottish Albums (Official Charts)	64
UK Jazz & Blues Albums (Official Charts)	2
UK Independent Albums (Official Charts)	15
