= Real Isn't Real =

Studio album by Nick Malcolm
- Released: 2019
- Genre: Jazz
- Length: 54:30
- Label: Green Eyes

Nick Malcolm chronology
Beyond These Voices (2014)	Real Isn't Real (2019)

Real Isn't Real is an album by Nick Malcolm, self-released on Green Eyes in 2019. Malcolm's quartet consists of Olie Brice, Alexander Hawkins, Ric Yarborough, and with vocals by Emily Wright, Marie Lister, Josienne Clarke, and Lauren Kinsella.

== Track listing ==
Real Isn't Real track listing
No.	Title	Length
1.	"Spiral I – Assemble"
2.	"Floating Earth" (vocals by Emily Wright)
3.	"Spiral II – Encircle"
4.	"Silent Grace" (vocals by Marie Lister)
5.	"Spiral III – Ascend"
6.	"Grass Remembers" (vocals by Josienne Clarke)
7.	"Spiral IV – Blues"
8.	"Real Isn't Real" (vocals by Lauren Kinsella)
9.	"Spiral V – Dissolve"
Total length:		54:30
