= Rebecca Nash (musician) =

British musician

- Born: Bristol
- Genres: Jazz
- Occupation: Musician
- Website: www.rebeccanashmusic.com

Rebecca Nash is a British pianist, composer, and arranger.

== Life and career ==
Nash was born in Bristol.

She is a visiting tutor at The Royal Birmingham Conservatoire.

== Discography ==
=== As leader ===
- Peaceful King (Whirlwind, 2019)
- Redefining Element 78 (Whirlwind, 2023)

=== Collaborations with one other ===
- Realms (2013) – with Rosalie Genay

=== As sideperson ===
- New Era by Entropi (F-ire, 2015) – Nash, Olie Brice, Dee Byrne, Andre Canniere, and Matt Fisher
- Moment Frozen by Dee Byrne's Entropi (Whirlwind, 2017) – Nash, Byrne, Olie Brice, Andre Canniere, and Matt Fisher
- What We're Made Of by Sara Colman (Stoney Lane, 2018)
- Awakening by Paradox Ensemble (2019)
- Active Imagination by Nick Walters (2020)
- Ink on a Pin – a Celebration of Joni Mitchell by Sara Colman (Stoney Lane, 2021)
- Implicate Order by Nick Walters and The Paradox Ensemble (2021)
- Outlines by Dee Byrne (Whirlwind, 2023) – Nash, Byrne, Andrew Lisle, Nick Malcolm, and Tom Ward
