= Outlines (Dee Byrne album) =

Under the Sun

Studio album by Dee Byrne
- Released: 23 June 2023
- Genre: Jazz
- Length: 62:01
- Label: Whirlwind

Outlines is an album by Dee Byrne, released on Whirlwind Recordings on 23 June 2023. The six-piece band consists of Byrne (alto saxophone), Olie Brice (double bass), Nick Malcolm (trumpet), Tom Ward (clarinets), Rebecca Nash (piano), and Andrew Lisle (drums).

== Track listing ==
Outlines track listing
No.	Title	Length
1.	"Capsule"	6:44
2.	"Flow State"	4:34
3.	"Arrow of Time"	7:55
4.	"On the Other Side"	8:36
5.	"Immersion"	6:16
6.	"Liberation"	7:06
7.	"We Are Experiencing Turbulence"	9:33
8.	"Don't Mess with Me"	5:59
9.	"The Dance"	5:18
Total length:		62:01
