= Nick Walters =

Nick Walters may refer to:

- Nick Walters (writer)
- Nick Walters (musician)

== See also ==
- Nicholas Walters, Jamaican boxer
