= Johnny Hunter (musician) =

British musician

Johnny Hunter is a British jazz drummer, composer and bandleader, based in the north of England.

== Discography ==
=== As leader/co-leader ===
- While We Still Can by Johnny Hunter Quartet (Efpi, 2015)
- Fragments by Fragments (2017)
- Has It Been Found? by Beck Hunters (2019)
- Going Down The Well by MoonMot (Katalognummer, 2020) – Hunter (drums), Seth Bennett (double bass), Dee Byrne (alto saxophone/electronics), Oli Kuster (Fender Rhodes/electronics), Simon Petermann (trombone/electronics), and Cath Roberts (baritone saxophone). Recorded Live at BeJazz Club Bern, Switzerland, 2019.
- Pale Blue Dot (Northern Contemporary, 2020) – recorded live at Jazz at the Lescar in Sheffield, 2018
- Revival Room by Revival Room (2021)
- Spinningwork (New Jazz And Improvised Music Recordings, 2022) – Hunter, Olie Brice, Cath Roberts, Tom Ward

=== As sideman ===
- Felicity's Ultimatum (2017) – with Martin Archer, Graham Clark, and Stephen Grew
- Dismantle Yourself by Sloth Racket (Luminous, 2019)
- Article XI: Live in Newcastle by Anton Hunter (Discus, 2020)
- Winifred Atwell Revisited (Efpi, 2022) – with Adam Fairhall
- Fire Hills (West Hill, 2022) – one disc being Olie Brice Octet (Brice, Hunter, Alex Bonney, Kim Macari, Jason Yarde, George Crowley, Rachel Musson, and Cath Roberts)
- Divisions (Discus, 2023) – with Olie Brice and Mark Hanslip
- Something Happened (New Jazz And Improvised Music Recordings, 2023) – with Michael Moore, and John Pope
- Practical Dreamers by Ron Caines (Discus, 2024)
