= Idris Williams (trade unionist) =

Australian coal miner and trade unionist

- Born: 21 June 1895; Mountain Ash, Glamorgan, Wales
- Died: 9 October 1960 (aged 65); Sydney, Australia
- Known for: Trade union leader
- Political party: Communist Party of Australia
- Relatives: Tori Freestone

Idris Williams (1895–1960) was an Australian politician, political prisoner, trade unionist leader and a member of the Communist Party of Australia. He was notable for being the first communist to serve on the Wonthaggi Borough Council, and for his high-profile role in numerous strikes and labour disputes across Australia.

Williams was depicted in the movie Strikebound (1984) by actor Hugh Keays-Byrne.

== Early life ==
Williams was born on 21 June 1895 at Mountain Ash, Wales, Glamorgan, Wales. He began working in a coal mine at the age of 13 and joined the Powell Duffryn miners' lodge.

== World War 1 ==
He fought in the World War I and lost his leg at the Battle of the Somme. He then left the UK in 1920 to live in Australia.

== Life in Australia ==
Soon after arriving in Australia he was living in Wonthaggi, Victoria. According to the Australian Dictionary of Biography:

He became deeply involved in the cultural and sporting life of the town as a leading choral singer, conductor of the brass band, chairman of the miners' union theatre and secretary of the East Wonthaggi football club.

Williams played a significant role in a 5 month long coal strike in 1934, after which he became president of the Wonthaggi District Trades and Labor Council. He was also a prominent member of the communist affiliated organisation, the Minority Movement, and served as the vice-president of the Victorian district of the Miners' Federation. Described as a famous and popular figure in Wonthaggi, his activism led and labour strike tactics led to the town being dubbed "Red Wonthaggi".

In 1944 Williams became the first communist to be elected to serve on the Wonthaggi Borough Council. He was later imprisoned during a coal miners strike in 1949 for refusing to reveal the location of £15,000 of funds belonging to the union of the strikers. During the final years of his life, Williams was active in the retired mineworkers' association, before dying of cerebrovascular disease on 9 October 1960.

== Legacy ==
Williams was depicted in the movie Strikebound (1984) by actor Hugh Keays-Byrne. The movie was based on the novel Dead Men Don't Dig Coal by Wendy Lowenstein.

Williams is the maternal great-uncle of musician Tori Freestone.
