= Black Focus =

Studio album by Yussef Kamaal
- Released: 4 November 2016
- Studio: Quartermass
- Genre: Jazz-funk; broken beat
- Length: 43:42
- Label: Brownswood Recordings
- Producer: Yussef Dayes; Kamaal Williams; Malcom Catto; Eric Lau; Richard Samuels

Yussef Dayes chronology
Black Focus (2016)	What Kinda Music (2020)

Kamaal Williams chronology
Black Focus (2016)	The Return (2018)

Black Focus is the only studio album by English duo Yussef Kamaal, composed of drummer Yussef Dayes and keyboardist Kamaal Williams. It was released on 4 November 2016 under Brownswood Recordings. Characterised by its "spontaneity and flow", the album draws influence from electronic music of British origin. It received universal acclaim from music critics, being described as having a culturally diverse palette.

In 2017, when Yussef Kamaal were scheduled to perform in the United States, Dayes' visa was revoked under the Trump administration and the duo broke up shortly afterwards. The album experienced moderate success in the United Kingdom, reaching number 13 on the Jazz & Blues chart. It earned Yussef Kamaal the Breakthrough Award at the 2017 Jazz FM Awards. In 2018, Williams released his debut solo album The Return, which was considered a sequel to Black Focus.

== Background and development ==
Yussef Kamaal c. 2016

In 2008, keyboardist Kamaal Williams met session drummer Yussef Dayes when Williams held his first event, where the band United Vibrations were booked and Dayes played. The two kept in touch and played together on occasion, but upon rehearsing William's solo work for a Boiler Room gig, they started playing as a band. In 2016, the band performed a 20-minute live set at Gilles Peterson's Worldwide Awards, after which Peterson landed them a deal at his Brownswood Recordings record label. Yussef Kamaal recruited additional musicians for Black Focus, including saxophonist Shabaka Hutchings, trumpeter Yelfris Valdes, bassists Tom Driessler and Kareem Dayes, guitarist Mansur Brown and producer Malcom Catto, who "work[ed] by ear" when recording the band "as opposed to having things programmed in", according to Williams. The album was recorded at Quartermass Studios. Calligrapher Haji Noor Deen wrote the band name in Arabic on the album cover.

Regarding the title Black Focus, Dayes stated that it was "based of a few things. The Black Focus is your typical South London car. We’d be in the studio looking for an idea and see it outside[…] And I think black culture’s been appropriated in a way, but […] people don’t stand up for it. What we’re making is black music, inspired by jazz. People can interpret that title however they want."

== Composition ==
"Joint 17"
A sample of the track "Joint 17", which switches styles back-and-forth.

Thom Jurek of AllMusic classified Black Focus as "a seamless weave of spiritual jazz funk, broken beat, and global sounds", with influences from "distinctly British sources its creators grew up on -- jungle, UK garage and grime, hip-hop, post-Joe Harriott British jazz, and the sound of underground radio". Kalia Ammar of Clash wrote that the album has "a consistent soundscape of gently streaking strings morphing into the buzz of Williams' synths, all whilst Dayes' frenetic afro-jazz and junglist drum beats rumble beneath". He continued, saying that the duo "captured the unpredictable and at times fragmented intensity of [jazz being played live]", as Dayes expressed maintaining the album's "spontaneity and flow" within the core principles of jazz. Ammar also compared Black Focus to the earlier works of Williams as Henry Wu and Dayes' drumming with United Vibrations.

The first half of the opening title track features spoken word, accompanied by horns "amid twinkling Rhodes and hand percussion". In the second half, kit drums are introduced to "frame a bumping bassline, a two-chord jazz keyboard riff, and horns that move to a post-bop frontline". "Strings of Light" is a breakbeat influenced track with synth-strings aided by horn breaks of "exploratory urgency". "Yo Chavez" has "a gentle Rhodes line", paired with "Dayes' brushed, skittering snare and kick drum accents". "Lowrider" is a snare drum heavy funk track that is topped by "vamping guitar chords, and swirling synths", which progress into "a 21st century take on Azymuth-esque fusion". The song "Mansur's Message" was said to have "bottom-heavy funk without overstaying its welcome", according to Ryan B. Patrick of Exclaim!. The final track, "Joint 17", showcases Yussef Kamaal's "canny polyrhythmic interplay" as its breaks and basslines frequently switch to keyboards that play "soul-tinged fills and runs".

== Release and reception ==
Black Focus was released on 4 November 2016. The album did not enter the UK Albums Chart, but peaked at number 13 on the Jazz & Blues album chart in the United Kingdom. On the Belgium Ultratop Flanders chart, it entered at number 91.

In March 2017, shortly before their scheduled performance at the SXSW music festival, Yussef Kamaal were refused entry to the United States after Dayes' visa was revoked in accordance with an executive immigration order implemented by the Trump administration. Several weeks later, the band announced they had split, leaving their gigging commitments unfulfilled. Yussef Kamaal were scheduled for a show at KOKO on 4 May 2017, but issued a statement that "for private and unforeseen reasons the original line up of Yussef Kamaal will no longer perform together". They each led their own lineups on that day "to ensure the experience of Yussef Kamaal".

=== Critical reception ===
Professional ratings
Aggregate scores
Source	Rating
Metacritic	82/100
Review scores
Source	Rating
All About Jazz	3.5/5 stars
AllMusic	4/5 stars
The Austin Chronicle	4/5 stars
Clash	9/10
Crack	7/10
Exclaim!	8/10
The Financial Times	4/5 stars
The Irish Times	4/5 stars
Mojo	3/5 stars

Black Focus was met with universal acclaim from music critics. At Metacritic, which assigns a normalized rating out of 100 to reviews from mainstream publications, the album received an average score of 82, based on 6 reviews. Ryan B. Patrick of Exclaim! praised how Yussef Kamaal "kn[e]w jazz and its progenitors, and transform[ed] this knowledge into a dexterous take on the genre". Alejandra Ramirez of The Austin Chronicle wrote that the band: "weave[d] a fabric of [jazz] steering free of up-nosed traditionalist conventions in pursuit of exploratory grooves and improvisation..." where they "[c]oalesc[ed] the bass-rich sounds of European club culture and Afrobeat rhythmic percussions[...] through a wash of Seventies fusion epics". Writing for The Indian Express, Anushree Majumdar compared the album to Herbie Hancock's 1973 album Headhunters, "But it's tighter, faster, fresh and refuses to colour within the lines of [jazz]." James Manning from Time Out said Yussef Kamaal "sound[ed] a bit like Weather Report" and that "Miles Davis is a big prescience, but so is J Dilla".

Ammar felt that the tracks on Black Focus were "unfinished sketches [with its] grooves that fade in and out from each other. Yet, the consistency with which this choice is exercised still makes the album feel like a seamless progression of an idea from start to finish." Theo Koltz of Crack gave a light critique for the album sounding "too languid, too lounge", further commenting in comparison to the works of Ruby Rushton and Hutchings that "it can feel safe".

=== Accolades ===
Black Focus appeared in year end lists by AllMusic, and XLR8R, who praised Yussef Kamaal for "channeling the energy of their live shows". The album appeared at number 13 on Time Out London's year end list, with Eddy Frankel stating "they might just have made jazz cool again". Black Focus was ranked at number 22 by Bandcamp, and number 20 by Passion of the Weiss, while writer Dean Van Nguyen gave testimonials on both sites, stating in Bandcamp: "In a post-Brexit world, where the British legacy of multiculturalism is suffering blow after blow, we need Yussef Kamaal to soften the impact." The album also ranked at number 19 in The New York Observer, number 3 by Happy Mag, and number 24 by Clash. As a result of Black Focus, Yussef Kamaal won the Breakthrough act in the 2017 Jazz FM awards.

== Legacy ==
Robin Murray of Clash considered Black Focus to be "a seminal moment in club culture and free music", and argued that Dayes' role in the album "blew the doors wide open for the current reign of UK jazz artists". Jemima Skala of Pitchfork said that it "br[ought] the South London jazz scene to the fore in the mid-2010s" Writing for the same paper, Andy Beta wrote: "Black Focus grows in importance and resonance. It continues to inform Williams’ subsequent releases, from his house music-indebted productions as Henry Wu to the group he helm[ed in Wu Hen]". Regarding the album's wide range of genres, Yussef Kamaal "captured the culturally diverse districts of the English capital" with their music "against the acidic backdrop of Brexit-era Britain", according to Nguyen. While considering the album as "a classic", Piotr Orlov opined that Black Focus undermined William's musical abilities. In contrast, Ammar commented that after his split from Dayes, Williams: "struggled to establish his solo sound without the powerhouse drumming of his former partner Dayes".

Regarding the breakup of the band, Williams stated: "It was not really a split up with [Dayes]. Music is about continuing the exploration of what it started off... Nothing has really ended; it travelled into something new and fresh now… Even if we do the Yussef Kamaal stuff, everything is fresh everyday." Black Focus was said to have contributed to Williams' rise to prominence. His debut solo studio album, The Return (2018), was considered a sequel to Black Focus, the latter of which William's record label is also named after. Dayes went on to record a collaborative album with guitarist Tom Misch titled What Kinda Music (2020), and would release his debut solo album, Black Classical Music, in 2023.

== Track listing ==
All track are written by Yussef Dayes and Kamaal Williams.

Black Focus track listing
No.	Title	Length
1.	"Black Focus"	4:34
2.	"Strings of Light"	8:28
3.	"Remembrance"	9:00
4.	"Yo Chavez"	3:59
5.	"Ayla"	0:46
6.	"O.G."	0:46
7.	"Lowrider"	4:28
8.	"Mansur's Message"	2:06
9.	"WingTai Drums"	1:16
10.	"Joint 17"	8:19
Total length:		43:42

== Personnel ==
Credits for Black Focus adapted from the album's liner notes.

- Yussef Dayes – drums, percussion, production
- Kamaal Williams (Note: All credited as Henry Wu, including songwriting.) – Rhodes piano, synth, production
- Adelight – recording (9–10)
- Mansur Brown – guitar
- Fabrice Buergelle – photography
- Malcom Catto – production, engineering, assistant production, recording (1–8)
- Guy Davie – mastering
- Kareem Dayes – bass
- Haji Noor Deen – calligraphy
- Tom Driessler – bass
- Shabaka Hutchings – saxophone
- Eric Lau – engineering, production
- Matt&Dan – art direction, design
- Kengo Oshima – engineer, recording (9–10)
- Richard Samuels – assistant production, engineering, production
- Yelfris Valdes – trumpet
- Selem Wakazi – photography
- Gordon Weddenburn – spoken word

== Charts ==
Chart performance for Black Focus
Chart (2016)	Peak position
Belgian Albums (Ultratop Flanders)	91
UK Jazz & Blues Albums (OCC)	13
