= DJ-Kicks: Kamaal Williams =

Compilation album by Kamaal Williams
- Released: 15 November 2019
- Length: 1:16:34
- Label: !K7 Records

Kamaal Williams chronology
The Return (2018)	DJ-Kicks: Kamaal Williams (2019)	Wu Hen (2020)

DJ-Kicks chronology
DJ-Kicks: Peggy Gou (2019)	DJ-Kicks: Kamaal Williams (2019)	DJ-Kicks: Mr Scruff (2019)

Professional ratings
Aggregate scores
Source	Rating
Metacritic	77/100
Review scores
Source	Rating
AllMusic	3.5/5 stars
Exclaim!	8/10
Mixmag	7/10
Uncut	7/10

DJ-Kicks: Kamaal Williams is a DJ mix album, mixed by British musician and producer Kamaal Williams. It was released 15 November 2019 under the Studio !K7 independent record label as part of their DJ-Kicks series.

== Critical reception ==
DJ-Kicks: Kamaal Williams was met with generally favourable reviews from critics. At Metacritic, which assigns a weighted average rating out of 100 to reviews from mainstream publications, this release received an average score of 77, based on 4 reviews.

== Track listing ==
DJ-Kicks: Kamaal Williams track listing
No.	Title	Length
1.	"Sometimes" (featuring Budgie)	1:49
2.	"Snitches Brew"	6:53
3.	"Summer Madness S.A." (featuring Karriem Riggins)	1:04
4.	"Space Invader" (featuring Lord Tusk)	2:24
5.	"Buggin' Out" (featuring Seiji)	3:06
6.	"Hey There" (featuring Steve Spacek)	1:53
7.	"Speed Metal Jesus" (featuring Max Graef)	2:05
8.	"Two Tens Madam" (featuring Kaidi Tatham)	6:17
9.	"Southern Freeez" (featuring Freeez)	3:48
10.	"Stuck" (featuring Peven Everett)	2:07
11.	"Sirens" (featuring Hard House Banton)	0:54
12.	"Cause I Love You" (featuring Diggs Duke)	2:20
13.	"MovingUp" (featuring DJ Harrison)	1:20
14.	"Ein Kola Bitte!" (featuring Ratgrave)	3:14
15.	"He's So Crazy" (featuring Wbeeza)	2:16
16.	"Pregnant" (featuring Awanto 3)	3:46
17.	"117 Careplan" (featuring Henry Wu)	2:00
18.	"Airglow Fires" (featuring Lone)	2:26
19.	"Projections" (featuring Earl Jeffers, Henry Wu)	2:20
20.	"It's All in the Groove" (featuring City People)	1:07
21.	"Peace and Love's Comin" (featuring Phil Asher)	1:36
22.	"Song for My Father" (featuring Tenderlonious)	3:07
23.	"Lowrider" (featuring Yussef Kamaal)	3:02
24.	"XL" (featuring Steven Julien)	2:28
25.	"Shinjuku"	2:03
26.	"Wivout U" (featuring Henry Wu)	1:39
27.	"Nuts" (featuring Dego)	1:29
28.	"Time Humbles Us All" (featuring K15)	2:19
29.	"Strings"	5:42
