= Moment Frozen =

Studio album by Dee Byrne's Entropi
- Released: 15 September 2017
- Genre: Jazz
- Length: 62:11
- Label: Whirlwind

Dee Byrne's Entropi chronology
New Era (2015)	Moment Frozen (2017)

Moment Frozen is an album by Dee Byrne's Entropi, released on Whirlwind Recordings on 15 September 2017. The five-piece band consists of Byrne (alto saxophone), Olie Brice (double bass), Andre Canniere (trumpet), Matt Fisher (drums), and Rebecca Nash (piano).

Reviewing the album in The Guardian, John Lewis described it as a "hybrid ... which marries John Coltrane’s late-60s interstellar voyages with Miles Davis's intense electric explorations of the early 1970s"

== Track listing ==
Moment Frozen track listing
No.	Title	Length
1.	"Stelliferous Era"	6:57
2.	"Fish Whisperer"	8:23
3.	"Interloper Video"	4:37
4.	"Moment Frozen"	5:16
5.	"It's Time"	8:23
6.	"In the Cold Light of Day"	13:34
7.	"Elst Pizarro"	7:42
8.	"Leap of Faith"	7:19
Total length:		62:11
