= Forward Space =

Studio album by Andre Canniere
- Released: 23 January 2012
- Recorded: 2011, London
- Genre: Jazz
- Label: Whirlwind Recordings
- Producer: Andre Canniere

Andre Canniere chronology
As Of Yet (2006)	Forward Space (2012)	Coalescence (2013)

Forward Space is an album by American-born, British-based trumpeter Andre Canniere. It was released on Whirlwind Recordings on 23 January 2012.

== Track list ==
1. Crunch
2. Forward Space
3. Cure
4. Marshlands Blackout
5. September Piece
6. Lost in Translation
7. Spreading Hypocrisy
8. Song for J

== Credits ==
- Andre Canniere – trumpet (tracks 1–3 and 5–8), flugelhorn (track 4), melodica (track 3), Rhodes piano (track 8 only), guitar (track 8 only), cahon (track 8 only)
- Hannes Riepler – guitar
- George Fogel – piano, keyboards
- Ryan Trebilcock – double bass
- Jon Scott – drums (tracks 2, 6, 7)
- Chris Vatalaro – drums (tracks 1, 3, 4, 5)
- Recorded in London, 2011
- Mix & mastered by Tyler McDiarmid, NYC, October, 2011
- Produced by Andre Canniere
- Executive producer – Michael Janisch
