= Kamaal Williams =

British musician

- Born: Henry Williams; 14 December 1989 (age 36)
- Origin: Dulwich, London, England
- Genres: Jazz; hip-hop; R&B; EDM; house; broken beat
- Occupations: Musician, producer
- Instruments: Keyboards; synthesizer; drums
- Years active: 2008–present
- Labels: Brownswood Recordings; Black Focus Records
- Formerly of: Yussef Kamaal
- Website: kamaalwilliams.bandcamp.com

Kamaal Williams (born Henry Williams, 14 December 1989) is a British musician and record producer.

He began his career producing house and broken beat music as Henry Wu, but rose to prominence with drummer Yussef Dayes as Yussef Kamaal, releasing their only album Black Focus (2016). Williams has since released three solo albums under his record label Black Focus, including The Return (2018), Wu Hen (2020), and Stings (2023).

Williams' musical style relies on improvisation, including live performances, and he creates music under his own genre of jazz, hip-hop, R&B and EDM which he dubs "Wu Funk". In 2024, he was accused of sexual assault by multiple women.

== Life and career ==
=== Early life and career beginnings ===
My life is the biggest inspiration.

— Williams, 2023

Williams was born as Henry Williams on 14 December 1989, in Peckham, South London to a Taiwanese mother and British father who both worked as architects. Growing up, Williams took an interest in learning Mandarin and Chinese calligraphy. From an early age, Williams was involved with a number of creative pursuits. His interest in calligraphy, as well as his parents' involvement with graphic design, contributed to an interest in street art and graffiti culture. Because of his mixed race, Williams struggled to connect with British culture, but was able to resonate with West African and Jamaican communities in Peckham.

Williams took an early interest in music. In primary school, he learnt drums and percussion which he played in the school band. It was during this time that Williams cultivated a formative grounding in jazz, funk and house music. His father introduced him to jazz with songs by Miles Davis and John Coltrane. Alongside an interest in jazz, Williams also developed a taste for garage and grime music. After attending high school at Dulwich College, Williams attended the Bermondsey Centre of Southwark College, where he studied music production and learned to play the keyboard.

Around this time, Williams began gigging regularly around London and, aged 17, started a band with Katy B alongside drummer Joshua McKenzie. He played with the group for two years before leaving to produce his own music.

=== Yussef Kamaal ===
Williams met drummer Yussef Dayes in 2007. The two kept in touch and played together on occasion, but upon rehearsing William's solo work for a Boiler Room gig, they started playing as a band. In 2016, the band performed a 20-minute live set at Gilles Peterson's Worldwide Awards, after which Peterson landed them a deal at his Brownswood Recordings record label. Under the label, the band released their only studio album Black Focus on 4 November and reached number 26 in the Official Charts Company's Jazz & Blues chart. Thom Jurek of AllMusic described the album as having "spiritual jazz funk, broken beat, and global sounds". Kalia Ammar of Clash wrote that the album has "a consistent soundscape of gently streaking strings morphing into the buzz of Williams' synths, all whilst Dayes' frenetic afro-jazz and junglist drum beats rumble beneath", and has also said that the duo "captured the unpredictable and at times fragmented intensity of [jazz being played live]".

In March 2017, shortly before the band's scheduled performance at the SXSW music festival, Yussef Kamaal were refused entry to the United States after Dayes' visa was revoked in accordance with an executive immigration order implemented by the Trump administration. On 4 May 2017, they issued a statement that "for private and unforeseen reasons the original line up of Yussef Kamaal will no longer perform together". On his split with Dayes, Williams commented: "Nothing has really ended; it travelled into something new and fresh now." Ammar said that the album contributed to Williams' rise to prominence. It also earned the duo the 'Breakthrough Act' award at the 2017 Jazz FM awards.

=== Solo career ===
In 2018, Williams released his debut solo album The Return under his newly established Black Focus Records label, charting in the UK at number 63. For the album, Williams enlisted the services of his former bandmate McKenzie on drums and bassist Pete Martin. According to Michael J West of Bandcamp Daily, Williams continued the style that Black Focus left off, where "it focuses on pure groove, augmented with loop-like repeated motifs but achieves them with live drums, funk-driven bass, and smooth, twinkling Fender Rhodes lines". Following the album's release, The Return was remixed by Snips with vocal samples from the Wu-Tang Clan. The staff of Mixmag ranked Black Focus Records as number one in its list of the Best Record Labels of 2018.

Williams released a 12" single titled "New Heights (Visions of Aisha Malik)" in 2019, with "Snitches Brew" as its b-side. The single's video was directed by Greg Barnes and its visuals take inspiration from martial arts.

In 2020, Williams released his second album Wu Hen under his Black Focus label. Critics noted the maturity of Williams in the album, and considered it his proper debut, which drifted from the sound in his previous albums The Return and Black Focus. Jack Bray of The Line of Best Fit classified the album as a jazz record, but stated that it experiments with genres, "Wu Hen could be an R&B album, it could be funk the next minute and then a house or breakbeat track the next minute".

His third studio album, Stings, had been announced, where with it, he intends to "integrate more oriental imagery and add more melodic elements." It was released on 27 September 2023 under Black Focus Records.

=== Career as Henry Wu ===
From 2011 onward, Williams released house and broken beat music under the name Henry Wu. In 2014, he released an EP on 22a, a London-based record label founded by Tenderlonious. In 2015, Williams collaborated with fellow London based producer, K15, to produce an EP entitled WU15.

From 2017 to 2020, Williams hosted a monthly radio show on NTS Radio as Henry Wu, playing a selection of music from his influences and associated acts in the London scene. In 2021, he was collaborated on the track "Homies" with British DJ Fred again.. as a B-side to the single "Hannah (the sun)." It was re-released as a deluxe bonus track on Fred again..'s third album, Actual Life 3.

Williams released an anthology of his Henry Wu material titled Shades of Wu on 27 November 2020. He also released an EP titled Phone Call on July 14, 2022.

== Musical style ==
"Mr. Wu"
A 21-second sample of "Mr. Wu", taken from Wu Hen (2020). Williams considers its "four-to-floor beat" as his signature sound.

According to a Bandcamp Daily article, Williams finds his ideas through "a rough, basic idea: a motif, a beat, a timbre, or a combination of the above". Williams prioritises rhythm in his music. Having previously been a drummer, Williams aims to bring a percussive approach to the keyboard. He creates music under his own genre of jazz, hip-hop, R&B and EDM which he dubs "Wu Funk". Critics have considered his second album Wu Hen as an example "Wu Funk".

Despite influences such as Miles Davis, John Coltrane and Herbie Hancock, Williams has rejected the term 'jazz' being applied to his music, citing the "elitist" and traditionalist connotations it evokes. Piotor Orlov of NPR said that "[Williams'] 'jazz' is grounded in post-Mwandishi Herbie Hancock, Bob James' "Nautilus" and J Dilla productions." Williams has also listed Jamiroquai, Roy Ayers, Donald Byrd, the 2001 album Execute by Oxide & Neutrino, and his home city of London as influences on his music. Williams said that The Return represents all of London. He was also initially influenced in producing hip-hop in the style of 90s boom bap.

According to Williams, when playing live he and his band "completely improvise with the base of the song. On the night we don't know how it's going to sound. Spontaneous and loose in the structure, it allows us to express ourselves. We just let it roll out." He also likens playing live to having a conversation with his musicians.

When Williams performed with Dayes in Yussef Kamaal, Jochan Embley wrote in a 2017 gig review that they had a "preternatural ability to predict and effortlessly follow whichever direction the other is about to fly off into." However, Orlov opined that the duo's album Black Focus undermined William's musical abilities. In contrast, Ammar commented that after his split from Dayes, Williams: "struggled to establish his solo sound without the powerhouse drumming of his former partner Dayes".

=== Instruments ===
On his album The Return, Williams has used a Nord Electro keyboard, a Roland Juno 106 and a Wurlitzer piano.

== Personal life ==
Williams adopted the name Kamaal (meaning "perfect") upon converting to Islam in 2011, and combined it with his father's surname. In a 2018 interview, Williams said that religion has played a key role in his career, reminding him to remain humble and grateful in the face of success. The doctrinal principles of Islam are the "foundations" of Williams' beliefs, and, according to the artist, "translate into his music". In a 2018 interview, Williams said on the topic of changing his name: "...as a creative it just allows you to express yourself in a different way. Henry Wu is my ethnic background, and Kamaal is my spiritual background." In another interview with The Indian Express, Williams stated: "Kamaal Williams is more like a conceptual band, and Henry Wu is the DJ, the producer, the mastermind".

Williams has claimed in an interview that he has Asperger syndrome, a neurodevelopmental disorder classed as an autism spectrum disorder.

Williams has been accused of aggressive behaviour towards fellow musicians, in Twitter threads posted by multiple music industry professionals. In May 2024, Williams was accused of sexual assault by three women, with the alleged offences occurring in November 2010, August 2021 and August 2023. A representative of Williams stated that the "very serious allegations are untrue and emphatically denied by him and that he will be able to demonstrate the same."

== Discography ==
=== As Henry Wu ===
- Stir Fry Beats (GorillaTech, 2012)
- Natural Complexion (XVI, 2014)
- Negotiate EP (Ho Tep, 2015)
- Good Morning Peckham (Rhythm Section International, 2015)
- Motions Of Wu Vol. 1 (Odd Socks, 2015)
- 27 Karat Years (with Tito Wun) (Tartelet, 2016)
- Henry Wu & Banton (Soundofspeed, 2016)
- Deep in the Mud (with Banton) (Eglo, 2017)
- Projections EP (with Earl Jeffers) (MCDE, 2018)
- Shades Of Wu: The Anthology (2020)
- Phone Call (2022)

=== With Yussef Kamaal ===
- Black Focus (2016)

=== As Kamaal Williams ===
- The Return (2018)
- Wu Hen (2020)
- Stings (2023)

=== Collaborations ===
==== WU15 ====
- WU15 (2015)

=== DJ mix albums ===
- DJ-Kicks: Kamaal Williams (2019)

=== Soundtrack contributions ===
- Boogie (2021)
