= Coalescence (Andre Canniere album) =

Studio album by Andre Canniere
- Released: 28 October 2013
- Genre: Jazz
- Label: Whirlwind Recordings
- Producer: Michael Janisch & Andre Canniere

Andre Canniere chronology
Forward Space (2012)	Coalescence (2013)	The Darkening Blue (2016)

Coalescence is an album by American-born, British-based trumpeter Andre Canniere. It was released on Whirlwind Recordings on 28 October 2013.

== Track list ==
1. Sweden Hill
2. Gibbs and East
3. Nylon
4. Gaslands
5. Zuid Intro
6. Zuid
7. Parallax
8. Point Zero
9. Elk Run

== Credits ==
- Andre Canniere - Trumpet
- Ivo Neame - Piano, Accordion
- Hannes Riepler - Guitar
- Ryan Trebilcock - Double Bass
- Jon Scott - Drums
- Recorded March 2013 in London at Red Gables Studio by Dick Hammett
- Edited by Alex Bonney
- Mixed & Mastered by Tyler McDiarmid
- Produced by Michael Janisch & Andre Canniere
- Executive Producer - Michael Janisch
