= Stings (album) =

Studio album by Kamaal Williams
- Released: 27 September 2023
- Recorded: 2022
- Label: Black Focus
- Producer: Kamaal Williams

Kamaal Williams chronology
Wu Hen (2020)	Stings (2023)

Stings is the third studio album by English musician Kamaal Williams, released on 27 September 2023 under Black Focus Records.

== Background ==
According to Williams, Stings "integrate[s] more oriental imagery and add[s] more melodic elements." Williams reportedly began composing the album on a newly purchased upright piano during the COVID-19 pandemic. The album was recorded in Los Angeles and Chicago in early 2022. Miguel Atwood-Ferguson features on the record as an arranger.

The visuals for Stings were designed by Sascha Lobe and Kimberly Lloyd.

On 29 March 2023, Williams gave an exclusive performance of the album's songs at a Roland store in London.

The song "PKKNO" was released alongside the track listing announcement of Stings.

According to XLR8R, Stings "is rooted in the South London jazz scene that birthed [Williams]" but "levitates into the impressionist symphonies of Claude Debussy, [and] hip-hop and electronic beats."

== Reception ==
Passion of the Weiss ranked the album at number 31 in its Best Albums of 2023 list.

== Track listing ==
No.	Title	Length
1.	"The Last Symphony"	1:30
2.	"The Guvna"	4:00
3.	"Stings"	4:50
4.	"Little River"	4:04
5.	"Dogtown"	6:30
6.	"Repercussions"	4:22
7.	"City of God"	3:19
8.	"Taiwan"	4:55
9.	"Ronan"	2:22
10.	"Magnolia"	3:56
11.	"The Last Symphony/Magnolia"	6:02
12.	"Magnolia II"	3:17
13.	"PKKNO"	2:47

Tracks 1–10 and 11–13 are split into separate discs in Spotify and Apple Music.
