= What Kinda Music =

Studio album by Tom Misch and Yussef Dayes
- Released: 24 April 2020
- Length: 45:03
- Label: Beyond the Groove, Blue Note Records, Caroline

Tom Misch chronology
Geography (2018)	What Kinda Music (2020)	Quarantine Sessions (2021)

Yussef Dayes chronology
Black Focus (2016)	What Kinda Music (2020)	Black Classical Music (2023)

Singles from What Kinda Music
- 1. "What Kinda Music" Released: 12 February 2020; 2. "Lift Off" Released: 11 March 2020; 3. "Kyiv" Released: 25 March 2020; 4. "Nightrider" Released: 16 April 2020

What Kinda Music is a collaborative studio album by English guitarist and singer Tom Misch and English drummer Yussef Dayes. It was released on 24 April 2020 through Misch's label Beyond the Groove, and distributed through Blue Note Records and Caroline. It is Misch's highest-charting album and Dayes' first appearance in the charts, peaking at number four in the United Kingdom.

== Background and release ==
Both members of South London's contemporary jazz scene, Misch and Dayes met at the launch party for Misch's 2018 album Geography. Misch had been a fan of Dayes' work in his former duo Yussef Kamaal. Misch and Dayes recorded What Kinda Music in a series of jam sessions, some of which were fully improvised.

Misch and Dayes shot a series of music videos for the album in Kyiv, Ukraine. During this shoot, alongside bassist Rocco Palladino, they recorded an impromptu jam session on a spare roll of tape that became the track "Kyiv", named after the city where it was improvised. On YouTube, they released music videos for "Kyiv", "Lift Off", the title track "What Kinda Music", and "Nightrider", which features a rap verse from Freddie Gibbs.

In July 2020, Misch and Dayes released a virtual concert for NPR's Tiny Desk Concerts series, on which they performed "Nightrider" and "Tidal Wave" from the album. The concert also features guest singers Jordan Rakei and Joel Culpepper, bassists Rocco Palladino and Tom Driessler, and guitarist John Mayer.

On 2 October 2020, Misch and Dayes released an EP titled What Kinda Music (Bonus Tracks), containing four previously unreleased tracks from What Kinda Music recording sessions.

== Composition ==
As the title suggests, What Kinda Music is difficult to classify into a genre, blurring the lines of acid jazz, psychedelia, hip hop, and electronica. It blends the contrasting styles of Misch, known for his polished R&B and neo soul melodies and Instagram-trendy guitar tone, with Dayes, a jazz drummer with more experimental leanings.

The album's style has been described by critics as "cosmic" and "dreamy" due to its heavy use of reverb. Its production, spearheaded by Misch, is warm and saturated, with Dayes' drums emphasized in the mix. The album's final track "Storm Before the Calm" is the only track with a saxophone, featuring saxophonist Kaidi Akinnibi.

== Critical reception ==
Professional ratings
Aggregate scores
Source	Rating
Metacritic	71/100
Review scores
Source	Rating
The Arts Desk	4/5 stars
Clash	9/10
Financial Times	2/5 stars
The Line of Best Fit	8.5/10
NME	3/5 stars
Pitchfork	6.9/10
Q	4/5 stars

What Kinda Music was met with positive reviews. At Metacritic, the album received an aggregate score of 71 based on 6 reviews, indicating "generally favorable reviews".

Writing for Pitchfork, reviewer Jemima Skala called the album "an expansive and fruitful collaboration" between Misch and Dayes "that brings out the best in each other." In a positive review for The Line of Best Fit, reviewer Joseph Blais praised the album's production and innovative mix of styles, calling it "a warm, vibe-y album for hype beasts and chops aficionados alike." Writing for Clash, contributor Kofi Yeboah-Mensah called the album "an incredible collaboration", noting its "highly effective combination of lead bass and drums." Charlotte Krol of NME called the album "a smooth, intuitive coagulation of sounds spanning acid jazz, hip-hop and electronica," complimenting the artists' musicianship and synergy, but also calling it at times "disengaging" and "probably more fun to make than it is to hear."

== Track listing ==
All tracks are written by Tom Misch and Yussef Dayes, with additional contributors noted.

What Kinda Music track listing
No.	Title	Writer(s)	Length
1.	"What Kinda Music"	Max Pope; Jessica Carmody Nathan	3:50
2.	"Festival"	Francis "Eg" Anthony White	4:42
3.	"Nightrider" (featuring Freddie Gibbs)	Gibbs; Miles James; Jordan Rakei; Syed Adam Jaffrey; Tom Driessler	5:00
4.	"Tidal Wave"	White; Rocco Palladino	4:09
5.	"Sensational"	Palladino	1:24
6.	"The Real"	White; Nickolas Ashford; Valerie Simpson	2:41
7.	"Lift Off" (featuring Rocco Palladino)	Palladino	5:18
8.	"I Did It for You"		4:01
9.	"Last 100"	White	4:00
10.	"Kyiv"	Palladino	3:30
11.	"Julie Mangos"	Palladino; Driessler	3:17
12.	"Storm Before the Calm" (featuring Kaidi Akinnibi)	Akinnibi	3:05
Total length:			45:03

What Kinda Music (Bonus Tracks) EP
No.	Title	Writer(s)	Length
1.	"Can You Feel It"	Palladino	3:09
2.	"Saddle"	Palladino	2:28
3.	"Tidal Wave (Outro)"	Palladino	1:44
4.	"Seagulls"	Palladino	1:30
Total length:			8:55

Notes

- "The Real" contains samples of Aretha Franklin's cover of "Ain't Nothing Like the Real Thing".

== Charts ==
Chart performance for What Kinda Music
Chart (2020)	Peak position
Austrian Albums (Ö3 Austria)	68
Belgian Albums (Ultratop Flanders)	25
Belgian Albums (Ultratop Wallonia)	128
Dutch Albums (Album Top 100)	57
German Albums (Offizielle Top 100)	17
Irish Albums (OCC)	40
New Zealand Albums (RMNZ)	40
Portuguese Albums (AFP)	19
Scottish Albums (OCC)	7
Swiss Albums (Schweizer Hitparade)	20
UK Albums (OCC)	4
