= Shards and Constellations =

Studio album by Alexander Hawkins and Tomeka Reid
- Released: 2020
- Recorded: April 13, 2019
- Studio: Challow Park Studios, Oxfordshire, United Kingdom
- Genre: Free improvisation
- Length: 50:55
- Label: Intakt; CD 344
- Producer: Alexander Hawkins, Anja Illmaier, Florian Keller, Patrik Landolt, Tomeka Reid

Alexander Hawkins chronology
Iron into Wind (2019)	Shards and Constellations (2020)	Togetherness Music (2021)

Tomeka Reid chronology
Of Things Beyond Thule Vol. 1 (2020)	Shards and Constellations (2020)	Of Things Beyond Thule Vol. 2 (2020)

Shards and Constellations is an album by pianist Alexander Hawkins and cellist Tomeka Reid. It was recorded on April 13, 2019, at Challow Park Studios in Oxfordshire, United Kingdom, and was released in 2020 by Intakt Records. While eight of the album's ten tracks were collectively conceived, the recording also features versions of "Peace on You" by Muhal Richard Abrams, originally heard on the album Afrisong (India Navigation, 1975), and "Albert Ayler (His Life Was Too Short)" by Leroy Jenkins, which first appeared on The Legend of Ai Glatson (Black Saint, 1978).

== Reception ==
Professional ratings
Review scores
Source	Rating
All About Jazz	4/5 stars
All About Jazz	4/5 stars
The Free Jazz Collective	4.5/5 stars
Jazzwise	4/5 stars
Morning Star	5/5 stars
Tom Hull – on the Web	B+

In a review for All About Jazz, Troy Dostert noted the musicians' "equal fondness for abstraction and lyricism," and wrote: "Both can play with absolute freedom, yet even in their most outward-leaning moments, a strand of melody or a graceful flourish can serve to re-orient the music in a tuneful direction... Reid and Hawkins prove themselves remarkably adept at finding beauty in even the most unexpected places."

The New York City Jazz Record's Kurt Gottschalk commented: "They're not just talented musicians but also smart ones, who don't just suggest a mood but convey a scene, with setting, lighting and time of day. It's really a lovely record."

Kevin Le Gendre of Jazzwise stated: "the duo investigates composition and improvisation as part of a continuum of ideas, thoughts and feelings that can move stealthily from frivolity to gravitas... the border between mainstream jazz, avant-garde and contemporary classical music can be crossed to good effect by artists, such as these, who have discipline and daring."

Writing for London Jazz News, Fiona Mactaggart remarked: "What is plain is the depth of communion between the two musicians. There is a feeling of confidence shown perhaps especially by Hawkins, with Reid showing an impressive expertise in extended techniques... A pleasure to listen to, this album will stand up to repeated listening."

In an article for The Quietus, Peter Margasak stated that the album, which features "refined dialogues rife with extended techniques, subtle textural shifts and quicksilver responses," "reveals a natural rapport that takes multiple shapes." He wrote: "The duo seems to be of a single mind, together finding a pathway, whether abstract or linear, regardless of how far apart them might appear at the beginning of each piece, but that connection never opts for the glib or predictable."

John Sharpe of Point of Departure called the album "one of the most successful outings for both performers," and commented: "Hawkins and Reid fashion a near perfect balance between form and abstraction... The chamber setting means that the program plays out like an ongoing dialogue between the two principals."

Writing for the Morning Star, Chris Searle remarked: "They make an ever-surprising and compelling duo, the true inheritors of three continents of sound... Their pointillistic, spiky notes... embolden each other's musical power. They create a transatlantic unity of resounding strength, unifying multiple traditions."

Jazzword's Ken Waxman wrote: "'strange' and 'familiar' are equally balanced so that expected patterns are given a newness to make them innovative... Inventive formulas and cerebral cooperation... show what can be accomplished in duo form as musical strands are united in unique fashions."

== Track listing ==
Composed by Alexander Hawkins and Tomeka Reid except as noted.

1. "If Becomes Is" – 4:13
2. "Shards and Constellations" – 3:57
3. "Danced Together" – 4:08
4. "Sung Together" – 6:13
5. "Peace on You" (Muhal Richard Abrams) – 9:46
6. "Strange Familiar" – 4:45
7. "A Guess That Deepens" – 4:16
8. "Serene and Playful" – 3:28
9. "Albert Ayler (His Life Was Too Short)" (Leroy Jenkins) – 5:04
10. "Is Becomes If" – 5:05

== Personnel ==
- Alexander Hawkins – piano
- Tomeka Reid – cello
