= Black Classical Music =

Studio album by Yussef Dayes
- Released: 8 September 2023
- Genre: Jazz
- Length: 73:54
- Label: Brownswood; Nonesuch
- Producer: Yussef Dayes; Miles James

Yussef Dayes chronology
What Kinda Music (2020)	Black Classical Music (2023)

Black Classical Music is the debut solo album by English drummer and record producer Yussef Dayes. It was released on 8 September 2023 through Brownswood Recordings and Nonesuch Records. It includes guest appearances from Shabaka Hutchings, Tom Misch, Chronixx, Masego, Jahaan Sweet and Leon Thomas, among others, and a posthumous appearance from Barbara Hicks. The album received acclaim from critics.

== Critical reception ==
Professional ratings
Aggregate scores
Source	Rating
Metacritic	86/100
Review scores
Source	Rating
AllMusic	5/5 stars
The Arts Desk	3/5 stars
Clash	8/10
PopMatters	8/10
Sputnikmusic	3.5/5
Uncut	8/10

Black Classical Music received a score of 86 out of 100 on review aggregator Metacritic based on five critics' reviews, indicating "universal acclaim". Thom Jurek of AllMusic described the album as "sprawling" and "a culmination of his aesthetic travels, and points squarely at his goal: a seamless musical whole", concluding that the "music is lush, advanced, and welcoming, and comes off without a trace of bloat or conceit. This is easily a top pick for best albums of 2023". Uncut called it "an expansive, soulful set that embraces modern West Coast fusion, Hancock-style funk, psychedelic soul-jazz and more".

John Garratt of PopMatters wrote that Dayes "takes the listener on a highly groovy and ultimately fulfilling ride through the peaks and valleys inside of [his] musical brain". Clash's Robin Murray concluded that "taken as a whole, however, Black Classical Music is a unique experience, a true journey, the musical autobiography of a musician central to the ongoing development of UK jazz". A staff review at Sputnikmusic remarked that the album is "packed with so many details and flourishes that AI won't be able to generate anything of its ilk until quantum computing develops itself".

== Track listing ==
Black Classical Music track listing
No.	Title	Length
1.	"Black Classical Music" (featuring Venna and Charlie Stacey)	5:19
2.	"Afro Cubanism"	2:45
3.	"Raisins Under the Sun" (featuring Shabaka Hutchings)	4:31
4.	"Rust" (featuring Tom Misch)	3:58
5.	"Turquoise Galaxy"	3:11
6.	"The Light" (featuring Bahia Dayes)	5:40
7.	"Pon di Plaza" (featuring Chronixx)	3:49
8.	"Magnolia Symphony"	1:37
9.	"Early Dayes"	0:34
10.	"Chasing the Drum"	5:40
11.	"Birds of Paradise"	4:09
12.	"Gelato"	4:46
13.	"Marching Band" (featuring Masego)	4:44
14.	"Crystal Palace Park" (featuring Elijah Fox)	2:32
15.	"Presidential" (featuring Jahaan Sweet)	2:42
16.	"Jukebox"	2:39
17.	"Woman's Touch" (featuring Jamilah Barry)	3:31
18.	"Tioga Pass" (featuring Rocco Palladino)	7:56
19.	"Cowrie Charms" (featuring Leon Thomas and Barbara Hicks)	3:51
Total length:		73:54

== Charts ==
Chart performance for Black Classical Music
Chart (2023)	Peak position
Belgian Albums (Ultratop Flanders)	73
Scottish Albums (OCC)	15
UK Albums (OCC)	37
UK Independent Albums (OCC)	4
UK Jazz & Blues Albums (OCC)	1
