= Nick Malcolm =

Musician

Nick Malcolm is a British jazz trumpeter, improviser and composer. He is bandleader of the Nick Malcolm Quartet, playing jazz–free improvisation.

== Discography ==
=== Nick Malcolm Quartet ===
- Glimmers (FMR, 2012) – with Olie Brice, Alexander Hawkins, and Mark Whitlam
- Beyond These Voices (self-released, Green Eyes, 2014) – with Olie Brice, Alexander Hawkins, and Mark Whitlam
- Real Isn't Real (self-released, Green Eyes, 2019) – with Olie Brice, Alexander Hawkins, Ric Yarborough, and with vocals by Emily Wright, Marie Lister, Josienne Clarke, and Lauren Kinsella

=== With Corey Mwamba ===
- Chat (self-released, Green Eyes, 2020)

=== Jade ===
- Jade Quartet – Live at Cafe Kino (self-released, Green Eyes, 2023)
