= Mike Fletcher (musician) =

British musician

Michael Fletcher (born 1982) is a British woodwind multi-instrumentalist, composer, arranger and researcher who works in the fields of jazz and improvised music.

== Career ==
In 2023, the Mike Fletcher Jazz Orchestra (MFJO) performed Picasso(s):Interactions, a large-ensemble adaptation of Fletcher's solo saxophone piece, at Victor Villegas Auditorium in Murcia, Spain.

He is a research fellow at the Royal Birmingham Conservatoire in Birmingham.

== Personal life ==
Fletcher was born in Birmingham.

== Discography ==
=== Mike Fletcher Trio ===
- Vuelta (Stoney Lane, 2015) – Fletcher, Olie Brice, and Jeff Williams

=== Other collaborations ===
- Insomnia by John Randall Quintet (Tentoten, 2008)
- Nick of Time (Slam, 2014) – with Olie Brice and Tymek Jozwiak
