= Life on the Edge =

Studio album by Loz Speyer's Inner Space
- Released: 1 February 2017
- Genre: Jazz
- Length: 66:09
- Label: Leo

Loz Speyer's Inner Space chronology
Five Animal Dances (2008)	Life on the Edge (2017)

Life on the Edge is an album by Loz Speyer's Inner Space, released on Leo Records on 1 February 2017. The five-piece band consists of Speyer (trumpet, flugelhorn), Chris Biscoe (alto sax, alto clarinet), Olie Brice (double bass), Rachel Musson (tenor and soprano sax), and Gary Willcox (drums).

== Track listing ==
Life on the Edge track listing
No.	Title	Length
1.	"Long Road"	5:26
2.	"Rocket Science"	5:47
3.	"Space Music"	7:16
4.	"From A to B to Infinity"	6:35
5.	"Fragile"	6:44
6.	"Unfold Enfold"	5:17
7.	"Thick and Thin"	8:10
8.	"Deep Sea Spirit"	4:43
9.	"Snakes and Ladders"	5:48
10.	"Contretemps"	6:01
11.	"Brewglass"	4:22
Total length:		66:09
