= 4 Blokes =

Studio album by The Louis Moholo-Moholo Quartet
- Released: 2014
- Recorded: November 12, 2013
- Studios: Fish Factory Studios, London
- Genre: Free jazz
- Labels: Ogun; OGCD 043
- Producers: Hazel Miller, Louis Moholo-Moholo

Louis Moholo-Moholo chronology
For the Blue Notes (2014)	4 Blokes (2014)	Sult (2014)

4 Blokes is an album by the Louis Moholo-Moholo Quartet, led by drummer Moholo-Moholo, and featuring saxophonist Jason Yarde, pianist Alexander Hawkins, and double bassist John Edwards. It was recorded on November 12, 2013, at Fish Factory Studios in London, and was released in 2014 by Ogun Records.

== Reception ==
Professional ratings
Review scores
Source	Rating
Jazzwise	4/5 stars
The Guardian	4/5 stars
Tom Hull – on the Web	B+

In a review for The Guardian, John Fordham described the album as "a set of astonishing intensity," and wrote: "It's not quite like being at a 4 Blokes gig, but very close."

Kevin Le Gendre of Jazzwise stated: "the music... has the kind of grit and guile that often defines populist traditions from around the world... Moholo-Moholo has been making albums with a vibrant, high-octane character, and this offering is a consolidation of his status as well as the document of an excellent group steeped in a rich history that is anything but passé."

Point of Departure's Michael Rosenstein called the drummer "one of the unimpeachable living jazz masters," and commented: "Now into his 70s, Moholo-Moholo is still hard at work keeping the legacy of his collaborators alive. The fact that he is fostering that legacy with multiple generations of players and delivering music full of vitality makes him all the more indispensable."

== Track listing ==
1. "For the Blue Notes" (Louis Moholo-Moholo) – 4:49
2. "Something Gentle" (Jason Yarde) – 10:04
3. "All of Us" (Alexander Hawkins, Jason Yarde, John Edwards, Louis Moholo-Moholo) / "Khwalo" (Dudu Pukwana) – 8:04
4. "Mark of Respect" (Gibo Pheto, Louis Moholo-Moholo, Pule Pheto) – 4:59
5. "Tears for Steve Biko" (Alexander Hawkins, Jason Yarde, John Edwards, Louis Moholo-Moholo) – 16:28
6. "4 Blokes" (Alexander Hawkins, Jason Yarde, John Edwards, Louis Moholo-Moholo) – 10:52
7. "Yes Baby, No Baby" (Louis Moholo-Moholo) – 2:57
8. "Angel-Nomali" (Dudu Pukwana) – 7:17
9. "Something Gentle (Reprise)" (Jason Yarde) – 2:02

== Personnel ==
- Louis Moholo-Moholo – drums
- Jason Yarde – saxophones
- Alexander Hawkins – piano
- John Edwards – double bass
