= Clave Sin Embargo =

Studio album by Loz Speyer's Time Zone
- Released: 2019
- Genre: Jazz
- Length: 61:17
- Label: Spherical

Loz Speyer chronology
Crossing the Line (2011)	Clave Sin Embargo (2019)

Clave Sin Embargo is an album by Loz Speyer as Loz Speyer's Time Zone, released on Spherical in 2019. Accompanying Speyer are Martin Hathaway, Maurizio Ravalico, Dave Manington, Andy Ball, and Stuart Hall.

== Track listing ==
Clave Sin Embargo track listing
No.	Title	Length
1.	"Stratosphere"	7:33
2.	"Mood Swings"	10:08
3.	"Lost at Sea"	8:37
4.	"Full Circle"	5:13
5.	"Checkpoint Charlie"	8:16
6.	"Guarapachanguero"	7:01
7.	"Crossing the Line"	9:07
8.	"Dalston Carnival"	5:22
Total length:		61:17
