= Tori Freestone =

British jazz musician

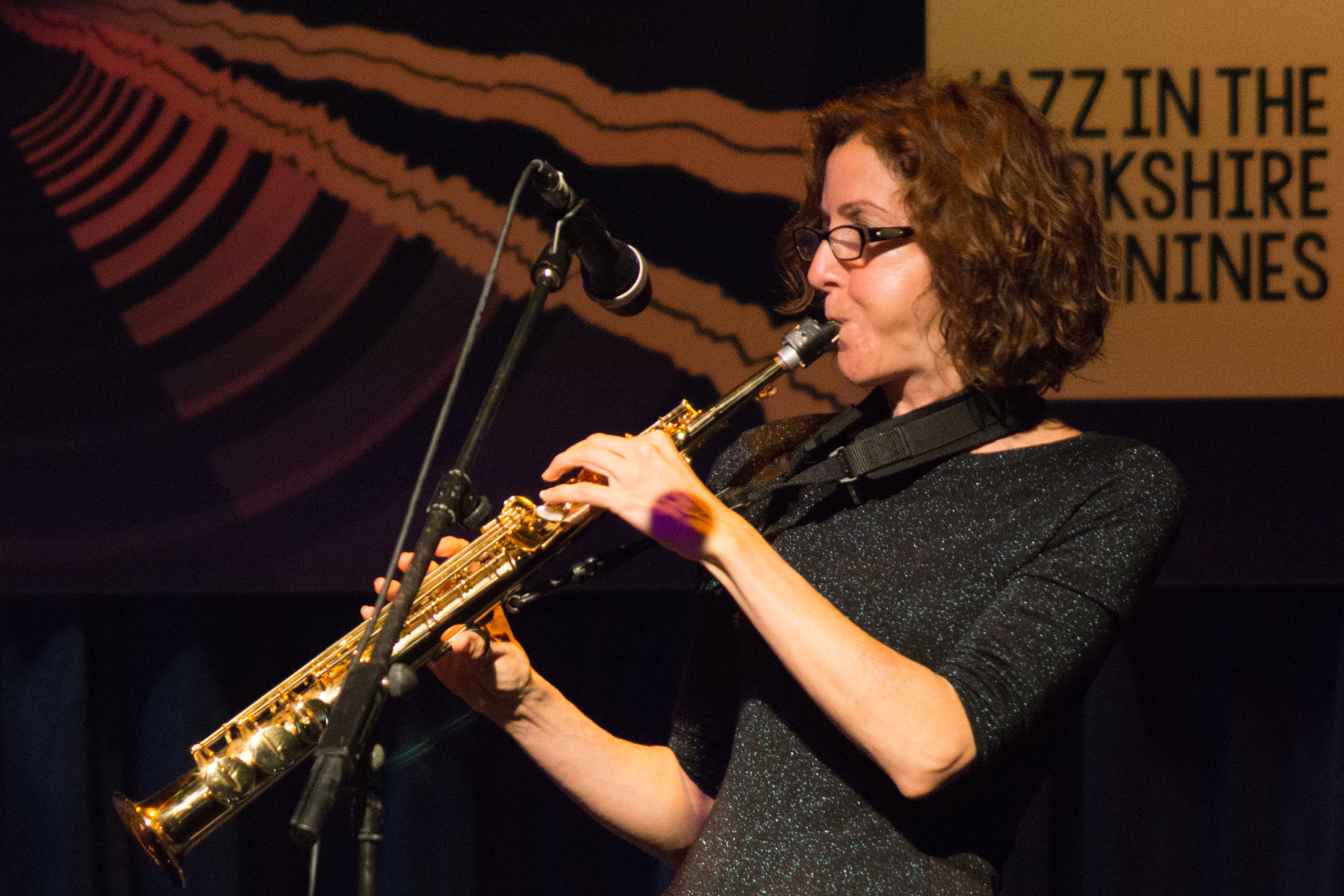
- Tori Freestone at the 2017 Marsden Jazz Festival [photo copyright: Pete Woodman]

Background information
- Born: St Pancras, London, England
- Genres: Jazz
- Occupation: Musician
- Instruments: Saxophone, Flute, Violin
- Years active: 1990–present
- Label: Whirlwind Recordings,
- Website: www.torifreestone.com

Victoria "Tori" Freestone is a British saxophonist, flautist, violinist and composer. She has performed British jazz since 2009 as a band leader and sidewoman, known for her robust tenor sound and melodic invention. Her "Trio" albums, released in 2014 and 2016, were awarded at least 4 stars. The Guardian critic John Fordham described her first album In The Chop House as "an imposingly original sound". In 2017 Freestone was shortlisted for a Fellowship in Jazz Composition supported by PRS for Music Foundation, UK Arts Foundation. That year Freestone was also nominated in the Parliamentary Jazz Awards 2017 in the Jazz Instrumentalist of the Year category.

== Career ==
Freestone started performing in folk clubs at the age of seven. She joined the National Youth Jazz Orchestra when she was 17 and then went on to study jazz flute at Leeds College of Music, then progressed to the saxophone when she was 26. Freestone likes to compose for unusual instrumentation that challenges traditional composition and improvisational techniques, most notably in her trio she explores the avenues of composing for a group that is led without a harmony instrument. Freestone features in many UK bands such as the Andre Canniere Sextet and Ivo Neame Quintet, but her main focus is on three projects: The Tori Freestone Trio, the Tori Freestone/ Alcyona Mick Duo and the sextet 'Solstice'. She has appeared at a number of UK Jazz Festivals including Manchester Jazz Festival in 2015 with a project with trumpeter Neil Yates and her duo with pianist Alcyona Mick. More recently she appeared at The Barbican, London as part of a larger ensemble all-star band with Hermeto Pascoal. She also performs on tour with the Julian Siegel Big Band.

== Recordings ==
Freestone's debut album with her Trio was In the Chop House, released in 2014 on Whirlwind Recordings. This album featured Freestone on tenor saxophone, Dave Manington on double bass and Tim Giles on drums. The Guardian gave the album 4 stars and said: "In being supported by only bass and drums (Dave Manington and Tim Giles), Freestone goes for one of a saxophonist's toughest options, but she is more than up to it."All About Jazz placed this album in their top 10 albums of 2014 and gave it four and a half stars.

Her second album, with the same trio, El Barranco, again released on Whirlwind Recordings, garnered similarly excellent 4-star reviews. John Fordham wrote "...fascinating once again for the ways in which an exceptional improviser can spin new yarns from the most deliberately restricted of resources – just an unbugged sax, bass and drums. Freestone has an arresting Coltrane-inflected sound..." In 2018 her duo album with pianist Alcyona Mick entitled Criss Cross received many 4 star reviews including one in All About Jazz "This is elegant, engaging and original music, played with magnificent panache."

In 2019, her third Trio album El Mar de Nubes received 4 stars from John Fordham "...this impressive trio shows formidable range, balancing free-jazz delicacy and bite".

== Discography ==
As leader

- 2019: El Mar de Nubes (Whirlwind Recordings) with Tori Freestone Trio
- 2016: El Barranco (Whirlwind Recordings) with Tori Freestone Trio
- 2014: In The Chop House (Whirlwind Recordings) with Tori Freestone Trio

As co-leader

- 2018: Criss Cross (Whirlwind Recordings) with Alcyona Mick

As sideman

- 2016: Alimentation (Two Rivers Records) with Solstice
- 2016: The Darkening Blue (Whirlwind Recordings) with Andre Canniere
- 2015: Strata (Edition Records) with Ivo Neame Quintet
- 2013: Ichthyology (Groove Laboratory Productions) with Jamil Sheriff Big Band
- 2013: Entertaining Tyrants (Jellymould Jazz) with Compassionate Dictatorship
- 2013: Clocca (Loop Collective) with Fringe Magnetic
- 2012: Yatra (Edition Records) with Ivo Neame Octet
- 2011: Things Will Be (Impossible Ark Records) with Riaan Visloo Examples of Twelves
- 2011: Twistic (Loop Collective) with Fringe Magnestic
- 2010: Cash Cows (FMR) with Compassionate Dictatorship
- 2009: Empty Spaces (Loop Collective) with Fridge Magnetic
- 2008: Club Rouge (Deep Touch Records) with Levan J
- 2007: Coup d'Etat (FMR) with Compassionate Dictatorship
- 2005: Sunday Morning (Deep Touch Records) with Levan J
- 2004: Cool Day (Deep Touch Records) with Levan J
