= Sarah Buechi =

Swiss jazz singer

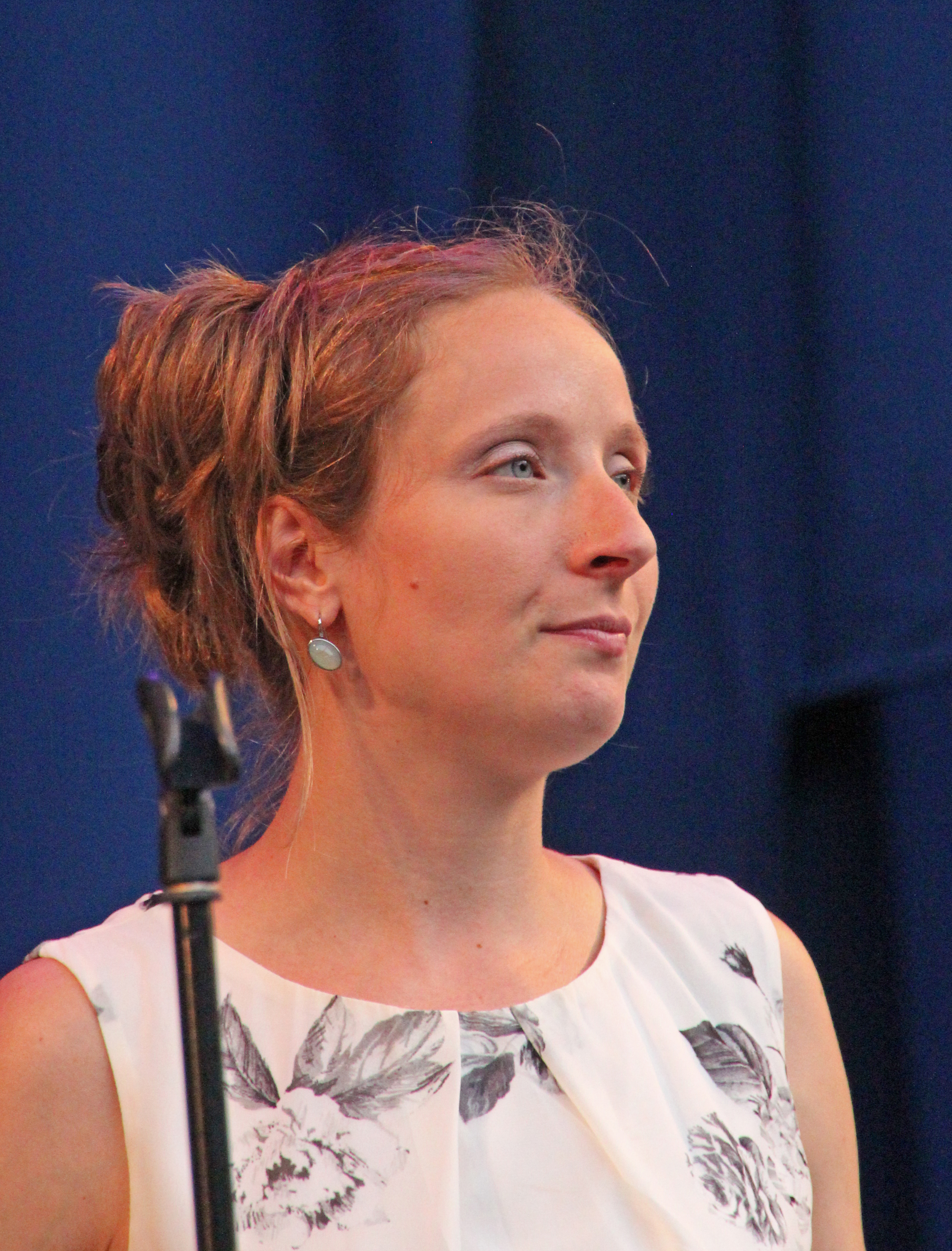
Sarah Buechi 2017 at the Jazz im Palmengarten in Frankfurt

Sarah Buechi (born 18 October 1981 in Luzern) is a Swiss jazz singer.

== Biography ==
Buechi, who comes from a family of musicians (her mother is an organist and choirmaster, and her father composer and piano teacher) and grew up in the Canton of Glarus aufwuchs, received violin lessons at the age of five. Next she learned piano and guitar. After playing rock music in youth and writing a Musical theatre she studied at the Jazz Department of the College of Music with Lauren Newton and Susanne Abbuehl until 2007, and for 18 months at the Karnataka College of Percussion with R. A. Ramamani. Since then, her vocals feature microtonal elements of South Indian music. She also had lessons with Médéric Collignon, Sheila Jordan, Jay Clayton and Steve Coleman.

In 2008 she toured with the band Zoom led by Lucas Niggli, then with the Swiss Indian Orchestra and with her group Thali, with whom she recorded her first album in 2010. She also played with the Helvetic Fiddlers at the Alpentöne festival in 2011. She also was part of the Christy Dorans New Bag and the Christoph Stiefels Isorhythm Orchestra, with whom she performed at the Jazzfestival Schaffhausen.

Since September 2008 she has been a lecturer at the Newpark Music Center in Dublin. In 2010 she received the Travelling and Training Award of Artscouncil Ireland.

== Discography ==
- Vidya Mani (Unit Records 2010, with Stefan Aeby, Matthias Tschopp, Marco Müller, Lionel Friedli)
- Christy Doran New Bag Mezmerized (Double Moon Records 2013)
- Flying Letters (Intakt Records 2013, with Stefan Aeby, André Pousaz, Lionel Friedli)
- Shadow Garden (Intakt 2015, with Stefan Aeby, André Pousaz, Lionel Friedli)
- Sarah Buechi/Christoph Haberer Animata (JazzHausMusik 2015)
