= Andre Canniere =

American trumpet player and composer

- Born: Andre Canniere; 1978 (age 47–48); Coudersport, Pennsylvania, United States
- Genres: Jazz
- Occupations: Musician, Composer
- Instrument: Trumpet
- Label: Whirlwind Recordings
- Website: andrecanniere.com

Andre Canniere (born February 20, 1978, in Coudersport, Pennsylvania) is an American trumpet player and composer. He is based in London, England, where he's lived since 2008. Canniere has toured throughout the United States and Europe, performing at Carnegie Hall, Birdland, the London Jazz Festival, the Hague Jazz Festival and the Rochester International Jazz Festival, among others.

== Education ==
Canniere received a Bachelor of Music degree in Trumpet Performance from Mansfield University in 2001. He then studied at the Eastman School of Music, graduating in 2003 with a Masters in Jazz Studies and Contemporary Media. While at Eastman, Canniere studied with Harold Danko, Clay Jenkins, Fred Sturm, Bill Dobbins and James Thompson. Canniere has also studied with Tim Hagans, Chris Martin, Mark Gould and Terell Stafford.

== Professional career ==
=== 2000s ===
Canniere moved to New York City in 2003. While there, he performed with many prominent jazz musicians and ensembles, including Maria Schneider, Bjorkestra, Ingrid Jensen, Donny McCaslin and Darcy James Argue.

In 2006, Canniere released his first album as a leader, As Of Yet, on Omatic Records. The album featured Josh Rutner on tenor saxophone, Ryan Ferreira on guitar, Ike Sturm on bass and Ted Poor on drums.

Canniere moved to London in 2008.

=== 2010s ===
Canniere released his second album, Forward Space, in 2012 on Whirlwind Recordings. The album features Canniere (trumpet, flugelhorn, melodica, Rhodes piano, guitar, and cahon), Hannes Riepler (guitar), George Fogel (piano, keyboards), Ryan Trebilcock (bass), Jon Scott and Chris Vatalaro (drums). Forward Space was named one of Jazzwise Magazine's albums of the year in 2012.

Canniere performed at the London Jazz Festival in November, 2012 and 2014.

His third album, Coalescence, followed in 2013, also on Whirlwind. Riepler, Trebilcock and Scott return for this recording and are joined by Ivo Neame on piano.

In 2016, Canniere released The Darkening Blue featuring Tori Freestone, Brigitte Beraha, Ivo Neame, Michael Janisch and Ted Poor.

In addition to his work as a leader, Canniere performs with Henrik Jensen’s Followed By Thirteen, Dee Byrne's Entropi and the Andy Fleet Band.

=== 2020s ===
Canniere released Ghost Days, his fourth album for Whirlwind in February 2020. The album features vocalist Brigitte Beraha, Tori Freestone (tenor saxophone), Rick Simpson (piano), Tom Farmer (bass) and Andrew Bain (drums). Lyrics and poetry were provided by Malika Booker and Rebecca Lynch.

== Discography ==
=== As a leader ===
- As Of Yet (Omatic Records, 2006)
- Forward Space (Whirlwind, 2012)
- Coalescence (Whirlwind, 2013)
- The Darkening Blue (Whirlwind, 2016)
- Ghost Days (Whirlwind, 2020)

=== As a sideman ===
- Andy Fleet, The Night Falls Fast (2009)
- Danny Valentine & The Meditations, The Lion, the Fish and the Bear (His Dark Master, 2010)
- Peter Conway, Mother World (2009)
- 4 3 2 1 (Soundtrack, 101 Distribution, 2010)
- Stooshe, Black Heart (WM UK, 2012)
- Takatsuna Mukai, Sunya (2013)
- Andy Fleet, Takin' Aim (Low Vinyl, 2013)
- Henrik Jensen's Followed By Thirteen, Qualia (Jellymould Jazz, 2013)
- Entropi (Dee Byrne), New Era (F-ire, 2015)
- Henrik Jensen's Followed By Thirteen, Blackwater (Jellymould Jazz, 2016)
- Entropi (Dee Byrne), Moment Frozen (Whirlwind, 2017) – Dee Byrne, Olie Brice, Canniere, Matt Fisher, and Rebecca Nash
- Overground Collective, Super Mario (Babel, 2019)
