= Ruby Rushton =

British band

Ruby Rushton are a British jazz band, led by Ed Cawthorne AKA Tenderlonious and based in south London.

== Discography ==
=== Albums ===
- Two For Joy (22a, 2015) – Ed Cawthorne (tenor saxophone), Nick Walters (trumpet), Aidan Shepherd (keys/synth bass), and Yussef Dayes (drums)
- Trudi's Songbook (22a, 2017) – Ed Cawthorne (flute and tenor saxophone), Nick Walters (trumpet), Aidan Shepherd (keys), Fergus Ireland (bass guitar), Joseph Deenmamode (percussion), Eddie Hick (drums); also Tom Marriott (trombone) and Ben Kelly (sousaphone) on two songs
  - Volume One
  - Volume Two
- Ironside (22a, 2019) – Ed Cawthone (flute, soprano saxophone, synths and percussion), Tim Carnegie (drums), Aidan Shepherd (keys), and Nick Walters (trumpet and percussion)
