= Yussef Dayes =

English jazz drummer (born 1992)

- Born: 12 December 1992 (age 33); London, England
- Genres: Jazz, jazz-funk
- Occupations: Drummer; composer; record producer
- Instruments: Drums
- Years active: 2009–present
- Labels: Brownswood; Blue Note; Nonesuch
- Formerly of: Yussef Kamaal
- Children: 1
- Website: yussefdayes.com

Yussef Dayes (born 12 December 1992) is an English jazz drummer, composer, and record producer.

He is known for his work with keyboardist Kamaal Williams, releasing the 2016 album Black Focus as the duo Yussef Kamaal and with English singer and guitarist Tom Misch, releasing the 2020 collaborative album What Kinda Music. Dayes released his debut solo album Black Classical Music on 8 September 2023.

== Personal life ==
Dayes was born in South London on 12 December 1992. His mother, who was from Somerset, worked as a primary school teacher and yoga instructor. His father, of Jamaican Rastafarian descent, worked as a merchant and played the bass guitar. Both parents built the family house Dayes grew up in. He is the youngest of four brothers, Ahmad, Jamal and Kareem, all of whom were taught piano. Dayes' father gave him his first drum kit when he was 4 years old, and Dayes began performing with his brothers. At ten years old, he stayed with his grandparents in Bath to attend a university course by drummer Billy Cobham. Dayes has one daughter. His mother died in 2015.

== Career ==
=== 2009–2016: United Vibrations ===
Dayes formed the band United Vibrations with brothers Ahmad on trombone, Kareem on bass, and their friend saxophonist Wayne Francis II where they played "Afro-beat stylings with forward-looking jazz and rock". They released their first single "Ra!" in 2009. The band worked as a backing band for Aloe Blacc while on his UK tour. The same year, they made a live appearance on Later... with Jools Holland. United Vibrations released their debut album Galaxies Not Ghettos in 2011. This was followed by the 2012 EP We Never Die and the album The Myth of the Golden Ratio (2016).

=== 2016–2017: Yussef Kamaal ===
Dayes met keyboardist Kamaal Williams in 2007. The two kept in touch and played together on occasion, but upon rehearsing William's solo work for a Boiler Room gig, they started playing as a band. In 2016, the band performed a 20-minute live set at Gilles Peterson's Worldwide Awards, after which Peterson landed them a deal at his Brownswood Recordings record label. Under the label, the band released their only studio album Black Focus on 4 November and reached number 26 in the Official Charts Company's Jazz & Blues chart. Thom Jurek of AllMusic described the album as having "spiritual jazz funk, broken beat, and global sounds". Dayes said that when the album was recorded that it maintained its "importance of core jazz principles of spontaneity and flow".

In March 2017, shortly before the band's scheduled performance at the SXSW music festival, Yussef Kamaal were refused entry to the United States after Dayes' visa was revoked in accordance with an executive immigration order implemented by the Trump administration. On 4 May 2017, they issued a statement that "for private and unforeseen reasons the original line up of Yussef Kamaal will no longer perform together".

=== 2018–present: Black Classical Music and other releases ===
Dayes released his own track "Love Is the Message" under Cashmere Records, and the live albums Welcome to the Hills and Live at Joshua Tree. On his solo work, he often plays with bassist Rocco Palladino and keyboard player Charlie Stacey.

Dayes, along with guitarist Tom Misch, released a collaborative record titled What Kinda Music, under Blue Note Records on 24 April 2020. Charlotte Krol of NME considered the album "a smooth, intuitive coagulation of sounds spanning acid jazz, hip-hop and electronica." Dayes saw his first appearance in the UK Albums Chart, as the album reached number 4.

On 8 September 2023, Dayes released his debut solo album Black Classical Music on Brownswood, and Nonesuch Records in the United States. Uncut called it "an expansive, soulful set that embraces modern West Coast fusion, Hancock-style funk, psychedelic soul-jazz and more", while Robin Murray of Clash considered the album as a "musical autobiography of a musician central to the ongoing development of UK jazz". Black Classical Music won the Best Album Ivor Novello Award in 2024.

He hosted the radio station Leonida Jazz Radio in the 2026 video game Grand Theft Auto VI.

== Artistry ==
Dayes initially took influence from his father's jazz and reggae records, his mother's love for country music and the Beatles, and from Ahmad producing jungle music. He additionally found inspiration growing up listening to grime and hip-hop: "That same energy and those different flows, I put into my drums."

== Discography ==
=== Solo work ===
- Black Classical Music (2023)

=== With Yussef Dayes Trio ===
- Welcome to the Hills (2020)

=== With The Yussef Dayes Experience ===
- The Yussef Dayes Experience Live at Joshua Tree (2022)
- The Yussef Dayes Experience (Live From Malibu) (2024)
- The Yussef Dayes Experience Live From Mt. Fuji (2026)

=== With United Vibrations ===
- Galaxies Not Ghettos (2011)
- The Myth of the Golden Ratio (2016)

=== With Yussef Kamaal ===
- Black Focus (2016)

=== With Tom Misch ===
- What Kinda Music (2020)

=== With Ruby Rushton ===
- Two For Joy (2015)

=== With Sampha ===
- Lahai (2023)

== Awards and nominations ==
Year	Awards	Category	Nominee	Result	Ref
2021	Ivor Novello Awards	Best Album	What Kinda Music	Nominated	
2024	Ivor Novello Awards	Best Album	Black Classical Music	Won	
2024	Ivor Novello Awards	Best Song Musically and Lyrically	Spirit 2.0	Nominated	
2024	Brit Awards	Best New Artist	Himself	Nominated	
