= Loz Speyer =

Musician

Loz Speyer is a trumpet and flugelhorn player, composer and bandleader. His free jazz quintet Inner Space, and his fusion of Cuban music and jazz 6-piece Time Zone, have both been running since 2002.

== Discography ==
=== Loz Speyer's Inner Space ===
- Five Animal Dances (Spherical, 2008) – with Chris Biscoe, Julie Walkington, and Seb Rochford
- Life on the Edge (Leo, 2017) – with Olie Brice, Chris Biscoe, Rachel Musson, and Gary Willcox

=== Loz Speyer's Time Zone ===
- Loz Speyer's Time Zone (33, 2004) – with Martin Hathaway, Carlos Lopez-Real, Phil Donkin, Simon Pearson, and Richard Bolton
- Crossing the Line (Spherical, 2011)
- Clave Sin Embargo (Spherical, 2019) – with Martin Hathaway, Maurizio Ravalico, Dave Manington, Andy Ball, and Stuart Hall

=== Proyecto Evocación ===
- Roots en Route (Spherical, 2010)
