= Alexander Hawkins =

British jazz pianist and composer (born 1981)

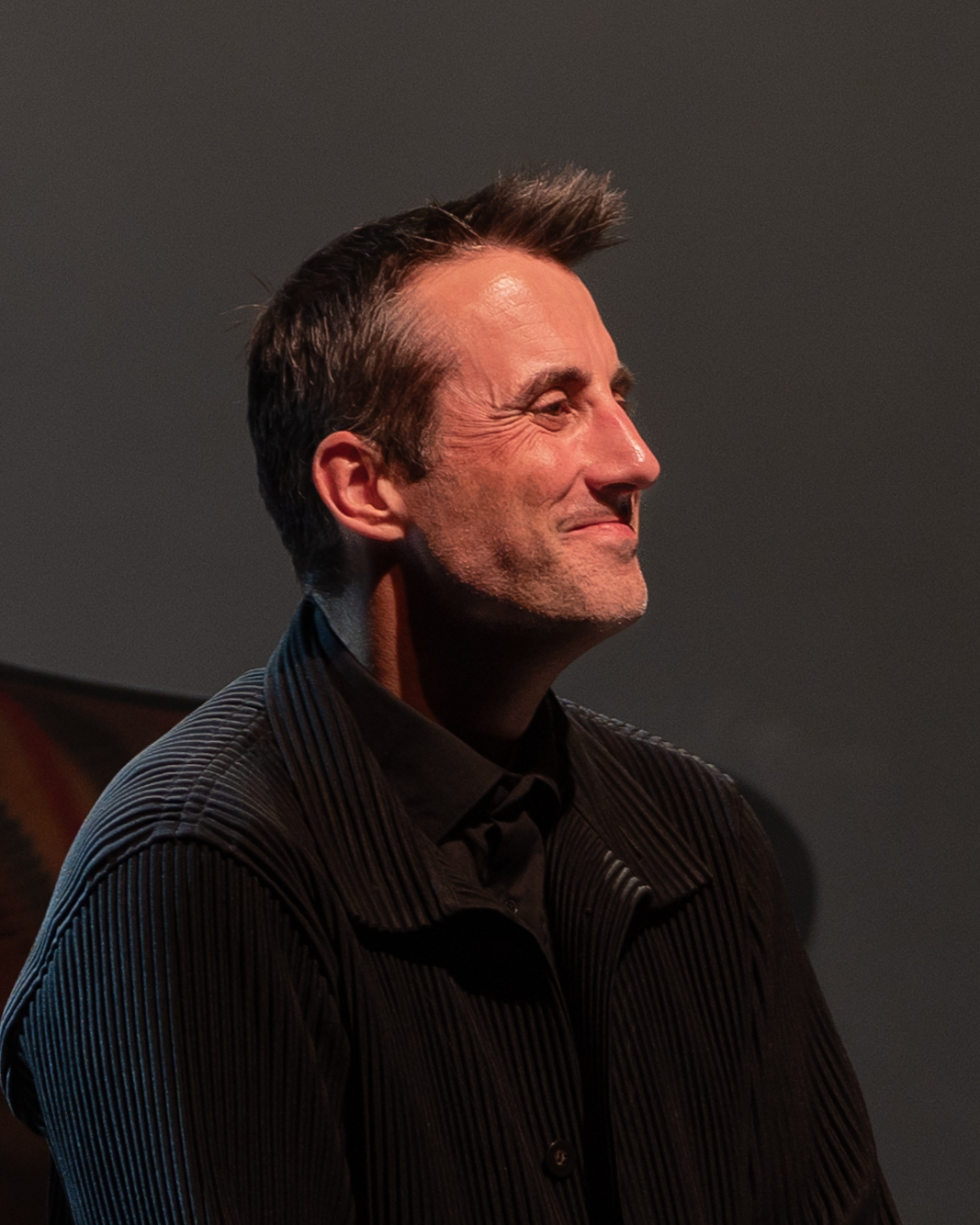
- Hawkins in 2025

Background information
- Born: 3 May 1981 (age 45); Oxford, United Kingdom
- Genre: Jazz
- Occupations: Musician, composer
- Instruments: Piano, Hammond organ
- Years active: 1990s–present
- Website: alexanderhawkinsmusic.com

Alexander Hawkins (born 3 May 1981) is a British jazz pianist and composer. Three of the main groups he has led or co-led are the Alexander Hawkins Ensemble; the Convergence Quartet (with Taylor Ho Bynum, Harris Eisenstadt, and Dominic Lash); and the Hammond organ-based Decoy (with John Edwards and Steve Noble).

== Early life ==
Hawkins was born in Oxford on 3 May 1981. His father played piano and clarinet and introduced Hawkins to jazz through early Duke Ellington recordings. Hawkins at first played classical music, principally on organ. He was educated at Radley College. He decided to concentrate on piano practice when he was 18. He started playing jazz in his mid-teens and played gigs in pubs with friends.

Hawkins lived in Cambridge for three years as a law undergraduate and for another three while studying for a PhD in criminology. There were few opportunities to play jazz there, so he was restricted to listening and practising. He decided not to study jazz academically, as he felt that the courses available were too prescriptive and that he had sufficient technique to play what he wanted. He also avoided transcribing and imitating the playing of others, concentrating instead on developing his own piano style.

== Career ==
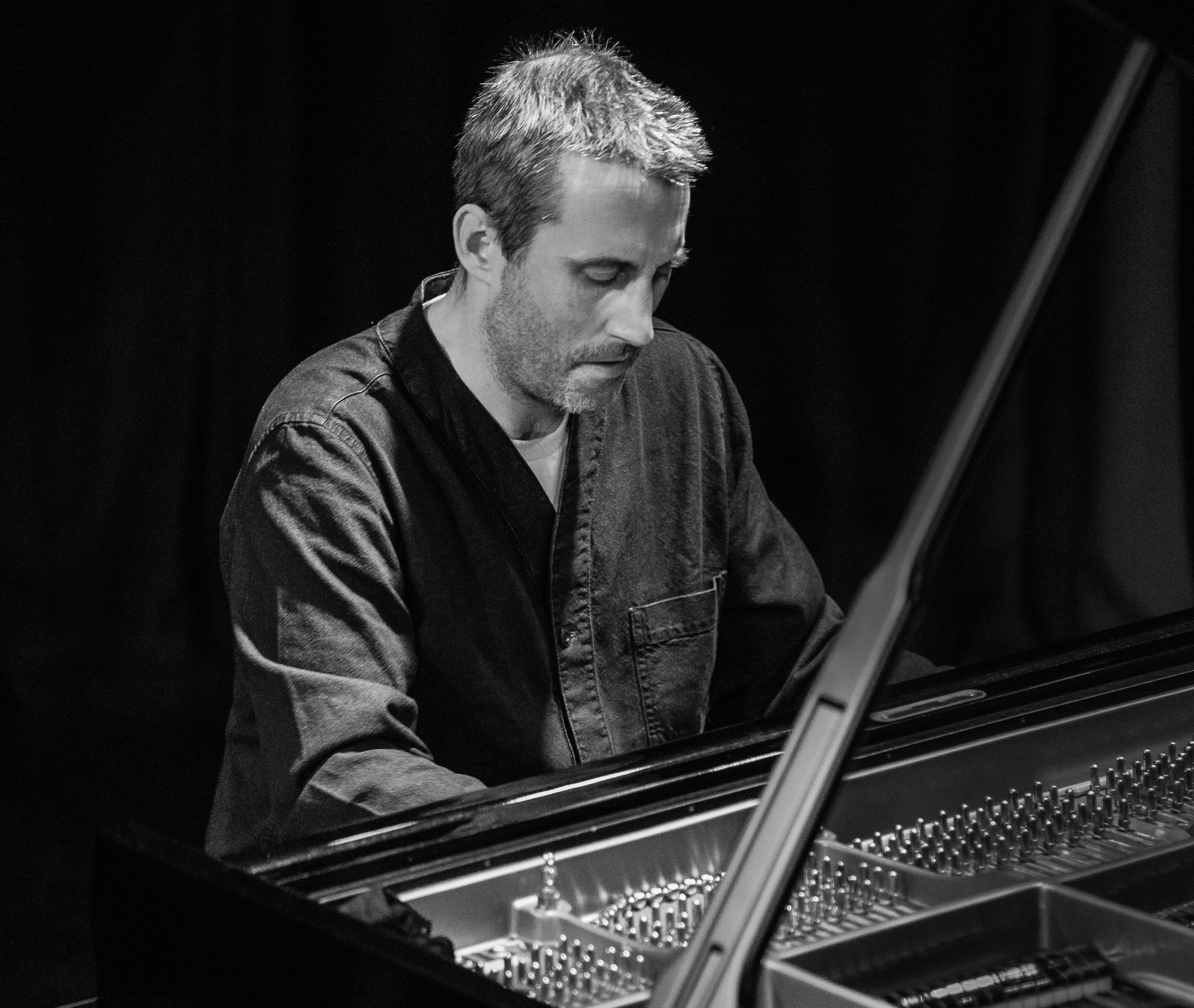
Hawkins in 2023

After returning to Oxford from university, Hawkins played regularly with bassist Dominic Lash and saxophonist Pete McPhail. Hawkins used his early experience of playing church organs when he began to play the Hammond organ. In the late 2000s, Hawkins was part of Barkingside, a quartet.

The Convergence Quartet was formed in 2006 by Hawkins and Lash, as the latter knew drummer Harris Eisenstadt and Hawkins and Lash invited cornetist Taylor Ho Bynum to play with them. All of the members of the quartet provide compositions for it. Their third album, Slow and Steady, was appraised by a Down Beat reviewer: "Genre, personal style, consent and dissent are all grist for the mill, and the music is best appreciated by considering how these vectors move the proceedings along."

The genesis of the Hammond organ-based trio Decoy lay in the owner of the record label Bo'Weavil, who wanted to create a Hammond recording, and drummer Steve Noble. The trio – Hawkins, Noble and bassist John Edwards – played one initial session for Bo'Weavil, which was released as different material on LP and on CD. There playing does not feature formal compositions. Some of their concerts and recordings have included guest Joe McPhee.

In 2012, Hawkins recorded his first solo piano album, Song Singular. It was described by The Guardian's John Fordham as "state-of-the-art contemporary piano jazz". It was released in 2014, at the same time as Step Wide, Step Deep by the Alexander Hawkins Ensemble, containing Otto Fischer on electric guitar, Shabaka Hutchings on reeds, violinist Dylan Bates, bassist Neil Charles and Tom Skinner on drums and percussion.

This version of his Ensemble emphasises, in Hawkins' view, rhythm more than the previous one did. The original Ensemble, formed in late 2007, contained guitar, cello, double bass, steel pan or marimba, and so stressed contrasts of tone colours at similar pitches. The change was made because members of the original group had to move and Hawkins preferred to compose with specific musicians, rather than instrumentations, in mind.

In 2012, Hawkins was selected as one of the first group of young composers to be part of the London Symphony Orchestra's Soundhub programme: "a flexible space where composers can explore, collaborate and experiment, with access to vital resources and professional support." Hawkins was commissioned to write and perform pieces for BBC Radio 3's Baroque Spring series in 2013. The music was written for the specific members of the nonet that performed it, included trumpeter Peter Evans.

Hawkins appeared at the Vancouver International Jazz Festival in 2014, as a trio with Francois Houle (clarinet) and Eisenstadt. Hawkins has often played with Louis Moholo-Moholo, who "has never once told me what to play or suggested what to play", according to the pianist. In 2015, Hawkins was asked to "write a new book of arrangements for London's Dedication Orchestra". He also released a trio album of his own compositions, Alexander Hawkins Trio, with Charles and Skinner. From that year, he collaborated with vocalist Elaine Mitchener.

== Influences ==
As a pianist, Hawkins has been influenced by a large number of jazz pianists, all of whom, in his view, had a unique sound. His main idol is Art Tatum; others from around Tatum's era that Hawkins learned from listening to included Earl Hines, Fats Waller and Teddy Wilson. Later influences included Thelonious Monk, Bud Powell and Elmo Hope; the last because "[he] seems to be just a guy who did something completely distinctive but without that kind of awesome baggage that Monk has". In Hawkins' largely chronological listening, Cecil Taylor followed – "I think that was the first jump in the language where I really had to figure out how that related to all the stuff I loved." A further influence was Marilyn Crispell, who created her own form of musical expression after being influenced by those who also influenced Hawkins.

On Hammond organ, Hawkins admires all of the main jazz figures on the instrument, but prefers to play in his own style.

Hawkins uses compositions by musicians who became prominent in avant garde jazz in the 1970s, including Arthur Blythe, Anthony Braxton, Leroy Jenkins, Oliver Lake, and Wadada Leo Smith: "what interests me about that period is that those are some masters who are showing interesting ways with structure. One way to create an interesting language: there's the micro level of the notes you play and in what order but also the macro-level language of what structure you're using, how you're deploying people [in an ensemble]". Hawkins also uses his own compositions in his various bands.

== Playing style ==
The Financial Times jazz reviewer Mike Hobart described Hawkins' improvising in 2010 as being "rooted in the early days of free jazz, when collective freedom was built on urgent rhythms, clear direction and a sense of history. He plays to the pulse and builds up a ferocious momentum. [...] Opening melodies provide structure, especially when modulated to different keys, and there are spiky riffs, swooping arpeggios and a bundle of jazzy references."

The Daily Telegraph's Ivan Hewett described Hawkins' playing in a trio as containing a tension between composition and improvisation and several forms of expression: "from radiant innocence to turbid chromaticism not so far from Viennese classical music at the turn of the last century. Far from being a noise merchant, Hawkins has a fondness for straightforward single lines in octaves. He can tease away at a mere handful of intervals for minutes at a stretch, [...] then, just when you think you've got Hawkins pinned down as a quasi-classical pianist, he'll break into a playful Monk-like bebop figure."

Critic Brian Morton wrote in 2010 that Hawkins' Hammond playing was "essentially pianistic. Even the clustered chords and wheezy shimmers [...] have the attack and articulation of piano", and that Hawkins was "The most interesting Hammond player of the last decade and more, he has already extended what can be done on the instrument and how far 'out' it can be pushed".

== Discography ==
An asterisk (*) indicates that the year is that of release.

=== As leader/co-leader ===
Year recorded	Title	Label	Personnel/Notes
2006	Live in Oxford	FMR	As The Convergence Quartet. With Taylor Ho Bynum (cornet, flugelhorn), Dominic Lash (bass), Harris Eisenstadt (drums); in concert
2008*	Barkingside	Emanem	As Barkingside. Quartet, with Alex Ward (clarinet), Dominic Lash (bass), Paul May (percussion)
2008	No Now Is So	FMR	As Alexander Hawkins Ensemble. Sextet, with Orphy Robinson (steel pan), Otto Fischer (electric guitar), Hannah Marshall (cello), Dominic Lash (bass), Javier Carmona (drums, percussion)
2009	Oto	Bo'Weavil	As Decoy, with guest Joe McPhee (tenor sax, soprano sax). Quartet, with John Edwards (bass), Steve Noble (drums); in concert
2009	Decoy – Vol. 1: Spirit	Bo'Weavil	As Decoy. Trio, with John Edwards (bass), Steve Noble (drums)
2009	Decoy – Vol. 2: The Deep	Bo'Weavil	As Decoy. Trio, with John Edwards (bass), Steve Noble (drums). Released on LP only
2010*	Song/Dance	Clean Feed	As The Convergence Quartet. With Taylor Ho Bynum (cornet, flugelhorn), Dominic Lash (bass), Harris Eisenstadt (drums)
2010	All There, Ever Out	Babel	As Alexander Hawkins Ensemble. Sextet, with Otto Fischer (electric guitar), Dominic Lash (bass), Hannah Marshall (cello), Orphy Robinson (marimba), Javier Carmona (drums, percussion). Guest Kit Downes (Hammond organ) on one track
2011	Spontaneous Combustion	OTOroku	As Decoy, with guest Joe McPhee (pocket trumpet, alto sax). Quartet, with John Edwards (bass), Steve Noble (drums)
2011	Slow and Steady	NoBusiness	As The Convergence Quartet. With Taylor Ho Bynum (cornet), Dominic Lash (bass), Harris Eisenstadt (drums); in concert
2011	Keep Your Heart Straight	Ogun	Duo, with Louis Moholo-Moholo (drums, percussion)
2012	Song Singular	Babel	Solo piano
2014*	Step Wide, Step Deep	Babel	As Alexander Hawkins Ensemble. Sextet, with Shabaka Hutchings (sax), Otto Fischer (guitar), Dylan Bates (violin), Neil Charles (bass), Tom Skinner (drums)
2015*	Alexander Hawkins Trio	Alexander Hawkins Music	Trio, with Neil Charles (bass), Tom Skinner (drums, percussion)
2015*	Owl Jacket	NoBusiness	As The Convergence Quartet. With Taylor Ho Bynum (cornet), Dominic Lash (bass), Harris Eisenstadt (drums); released as a limited edition LP and digital download
2016*	Leaps in Leicester	Clean Feed	Duo, with Evan Parker (tenor sax)
2016–17	Unit[e]	Alexander Hawkins Music	Some tracks sextet, with Shabaka Hutchings (bass clarinet, tenor sax), Otto Fischer (electric guitar), Dylan Bates (violin), Neil Charles (bass), Tom Skinner (drums); some tracks with James Arben (flute, tenor sax, bass clarinet), Bates (violin), Charles (bass), Stephen Davis (drums, percussion), Fischer (guitar), Laura Jurd (trumpet), Julie Kjaer (flute, alto flute, alto saxophone, bass clarinet), Nick Malcolm (trumpet, flugelhorn), Hannah Marshall (cello), Percy Pursglove (trumpet, double bass), Alex Ward (clarinet), Matthew Wright (live electronics)
2017	UpRoot	Intakt	As Alexander Hawkins / Elaine Mitchener Quartet. Quartet, with Elaine Mitchener (vocals), Neil Charles (bass), Stephen Davis (drums, percussion)
2018*	You Have Options	Songlines	Trio, with François Houle (clarinet), Harris Eistenstadt (drums)
2018	Iron into Wind	Intakt	Solo piano
2019	Shards and Constellations	Intakt	Duo, co-led with Tomeka Reid (cello)
2020	AC/DC	OTOroku	As Decoy, quartet, with John Edwards (bass), Steve Noble (drums). Guest Joe McPhee (pocket trumpet, alto sax).
2021	Togetherness Music	Intakt	With Evan Parker + Riot Ensemble
2022	Break a Vase	Intakt	& Mirror Canon [Richard Olátúndé Baker, (talking drum, percussion), Neil Charles (double bass), Stephen Davis (drums), Otto Fischer(electric guitar), Shabaka Hutchings (tenor & soprano sax, flute)]
2022	Carnival Celestial	Intakt	With Neil Charles (bass) and Stephen Davis (drums)
2023	Musho	Intakt	Duo, co-led with Sofia Jernberg (vocals)

=== As sideman ===
Year recorded	Leader	Title	Label	Personnel/Notes
2011	Nick Malcolm	Glimmers	FMR	Quartet, with Olie Brice (bass), Mark Whitlam (drums)
2013*	Dominic Lash	Opabinia	Babel	Quartet, with Ricardo Tejero (reeds), Javier Carmona (drums)
2013*	Mulatu Astatke	Sketches of Ethiopia	Jazz Village	
2013*	Steve Davis	Being Human	Babel	Credited to "Human". Quartet, with Dylan Bates (violin), Alex Bonney (trumpet)
2013	Nick Malcolm	Beyond These Voices	Green Eyes	Quartet, with Olie Brice (bass), Mark Whitlam (drums)
2013	Louis Moholo-Moholo	4 Blokes	Ogun	Quartet, with Jason Yarde (sax), John Edwards (bass)
2014*	Louis Moholo-Moholo	For the Blue Notes	Ogun	With Henry Lowther (trumpet), Alan Tomlinson (trombone), Ntshuks Bonga (soprano sax, alto sax), Jason Yarde (soprano sax, alto sax), John Edwards (bass); Francine Luce (vocals) added on some tracks; in concert
2014*	Roberto Ottaviano	Forgotten Matches. The Worlds of Steve Lacy	Dodicilune	Duo
2016	Chicago/London Underground	A Night Walking Through Mirrors	Cuneiform	Quartet, with Rob Mazurek (cornet, voice, sampling, electronics), Chad Taylor (drums, mbira, electronics), John Edwards (bass); in concert
2017	Louis Moholo-Moholo	Uplift the People	Ogun	Quintet, with Jason Yarde and Shabaka Hutchings (sax), John Edwards (bass); in concert
2020	Karl Evangelista	Apura!	Astral Spirits	Quartet, with Karl Evangelista (guitar), Trevor Watts (alto and soprano saxophones), and Louis Moholo-Moholo (drums)
2022	Kofi Flexxx	Flowers in the Dark	Native Rebel	With Billy Woods, Anthony Joseph and Confucius MC (spoken word, rap), Daisy George (bass), Siyabonga Mthembu (vocals)
