= The Return (Kamaal Williams album) =

Studio album by Kamaal Williams
- Released: 25 May 2018
- Studio: Williams's mother's living room
- Genres: Jazz-funk; psychedelia; hip-hop; EDM
- Length: 44:23
- Label: Black Focus
- Producers: Kamaal Williams; Richard Samuels

Kamaal Williams chronology
Black Focus (2016)	The Return (2018)	DJ-Kicks: Kamaal Williams (2019)

The Return is the debut studio album by British musician and producer Kamaal Williams. It was released on 25 May 2018, under his Black Focus Record label. After the breakup of the band Yussef Kamaal, Williams sought to recreate the sounds of their 2016 album Black Focus with bassist Pete Martin, drummer Josh McKenzie and producer Richard Samuels. The album is built on improvisation and its ideas are based on their recorded jam sessions.

Two music videos were released for the album, "Catch the Loop" and "Salaam", both directed by Greg Barnes. Williams also announced a tour across Europe in 2018 and in North America in 2019. The Return received generally favorable reviews from music critics, some praising the re-creation of jazz-funk sounds of the 1970s, while others questioned the length of certain songs. In the United Kingdom, it marked his first entry in the albums chart at number 63, while in the Jazz & Blues chart it ranked number 1. The album also reached number 3 in the Top Jazz Albums chart in America.

== Background and development ==
Keyboardist Kamaal Williams formed Yussef Kamaal with drummer Yussef Dayes and released Black Focus in 2016. Shortly afterwards, the band broke up in May 2017 for "private and unforeseen reasons". With The Return, Williams continues the style that Black Focus left off, where "it focuses on pure groove, augmented with loop-like repeated motifs but achieves them with live drums, funk-driven bass, and smooth, twinkling Fender Rhodes lines". Michael J West of Bandcamp Daily said that the album continued Williams' "jazz fusion" reputation, which Williams rejected. He instead considered the album to be "the essence of the London Underground", clarifying that the musicians involved were from London.

The album relies on improvisation based on the "rhythmic exchange" between Williams, bassist Pete Martin and drummer Josh "MckNasty" McKenzie. According to West, Williams finds his ideas though "a rough, basic idea: a motif, a beat, a timbre, or a combination of the above". The band recorded jams for up to 20 minutes and selected highlights to use for tracks, which Williams considers "the most natural way to do it". Williams recorded The Return with the band in his mother's living room, "I had no money, no studio, just one mic." He and engineer Richard Samuels mixed the album for six months, (Note: Williams also acknowledged Samuels as a band member.) the drums in particular "took weeks" to mix. The album was mastered by Guy Davie at Electric studios. Calligrapher Haji Noor Deen wrote Williams' first name in Arabic on the album cover.

== Composition ==
Matt Collar of AllMusic described The Return as a "psychedelia-dipped" jazz-funk record that incorporates EDM and hip-hop. He additionally said that the band are capable of "dropping bass- and keyboard-heavy hooks, rhythm section motifs that sound like the intros, and hot mid-sections", similar to that of George Duke, Herbie Hancock, and Eddie Henderson. The album employs a "a more laid back, funk-soaked sound" in contrast to the "darker edge" of Black Focus, according to Angus McKeon of Clash. John Paul of PopMatters writes that "the album's back half tends to lessen the tempos and allow for greater washes of synth to blanket the incessant rhythmic prowess on display".

The first track "Salaam" has "watery keys and a groove that starts slow before working itself up to a bustling climax"; as "MckNasty quickens the tempo, Martin strings together galloping phrases, and Williams begins making his own runs". For the next track "Broken Theme", it has "off-kilter drums and keys" that "snap into line" every few seconds later. The string-arrangement of the title track was compared to Jon Brion's work on Late Registration by Kanye West. Its "powerful strings build to a tantalising crescendo" and transitions to funk driven song "High Roller". The fifth track "Situations" was recorded during a live performance in Milan.

For "Catch the Loop", the track uses breakbeat sounds with "a series of vintage synth stabs", its rhythm then "lessens to a lock-step, club-footed march". "Rhythm Commission" is "a slowly evolving groove that, by track's end, has blossomed into a gloriously funky exercise in rhythmic precision". For "Medina", the track has a 3/4 rhythm "Williams developing melodic motifs on top". The ninth track "LDN Shuffle" features guitar soloing from Mansur Brown compared to that of Allan Holdsworth. The closing track "Aisha" is a minimalist track that has layers of "ambient synth pads".

== Release and promotion ==
The Return was released on 25 May 2018 under Williams' own label Black Focus Records. The album topped the UK Jazz & Blues chart, while it marked Williams' first entry in the Official Albums Chart at number 63. In the country's Independent Albums Chart, it ranked at number 5. The album reached number 82 in the Scottish Albums Chart. The album debuted in the US Top Jazz Albums chart at number 3. In the Belgian Ultratop Flanders Chart, it reached number 182. Prior to the album's release, Williams listed tour dates for March and April 2018 in the UK, Germany, France, Belgium and the Netherlands. He also announced a tour in America and Canada for March 2019 in support of the album.

Music videos for "Catch the Loop" and "Salaam" were released, both directed and filmed by Greg Barnes. After he and Williams worked together on "Catch the Loop", they saw The Return as "the soundtrack to an unmade, and epic film". The next video "Salaam" was filmed in Marrakesh, Morocco in two days. Williams said:

Marrakech is a special place for me, both spiritually and creatively. Every time I go, I feel alive again and it's a huge inspiration for my work[…] Working with local people in the medina and sharing our story with the community made this experience real. Barnes captured the essence of my relationship with the city as well as the colors and the energy of everything in it.

== Reception ==
Professional ratings
Aggregate scores
Source	Rating
Metacritic	76/100
Review scores
Source	Rating
AllMusic	3.5/5 stars
Clash	8/10
Exclaim!	8/10
Mojo	3/5 stars
MusicOMH	4/5 stars
Pitchfork	8.0/10
PopMatters	7/10
The Times	4/5 stars
Uncut	8/10

The Return was met with "generally favorable" reviews from critics. At Metacritic, which assigns a weighted average rating out of 100 to reviews from mainstream publications, this release received an average score of 77, based on 9 reviews.

Critics praised The Return for its recreation of jazz and funk sounds of the 1970s, where Piotor Orlov of NPR writes: "Surrounded by a music scene constantly looking to invoke far-off traditions or break historically new ground, its goals seem comparatively conservative." Dean van Nguyen of Pitchfork commented that "while Dayes' rasping drumming is missed, newly recruited percussionist MckNasty offers his own urbane rhythms." He continued that Williams "present[s] himself as belonging to the same continuum as Yussef Kamaal while establishing himself as a solo artist[…] Yet The Return does even more".

Will Hodgkinson writes that The Return "can dissolve into fiddly muso abstraction — the guitar solo on LDN Shuffle seems to be an attempt to play as many notes as possible — but with the gloriously bouncy Salaam and the space-age Aisha[…] this is ideal jazz for a summer's day." Critics questioned the short lengths "Rhythm Commission" and the title track, with Nguyen stating that "there was room for this album to grow." Ben Devlin of MusicOMH wrote that the track "'LDN Shuffle' never quite justifies its own existence over its five-and-a-half minute run-time, but such noodling can be forgiven to an extent on an album that is more about groove than melody".

=== Accolades ===
The Return appeared on numerous year-end lists in 2018. Bleep ranked The Return at number 6 on its year end list, with the staff commending its "rich tapestry of visionary jazz woven together with the sounds and signals of South London Streets" and called it "one of the most exciting musical movements 2018 has witnessed". The album was ranked at number 8 by Complex magazine, with Chantelle Fiddy writing that it "provided a backdrop for an increasingly diverse listenership seeking respite and something real in this tech-compressed hectic old world we find ourselves in". Piccadillly Records placed the album at number 48 on its year end list, the staff wrote: "brilliantly funked-up jazz groves, rolling bass licks and flickering percussions make this not only a fitting follow-up to Williams' collaboration LP from last year but a significant progression".

Accolades for The Return
Publication	Accolade	Rank	Ref.
Bandcamp	Bandcamp's Top 100 Albums of 2018	49	
Bleep	Bleep's Top 10 Albums of 2018	6	
Complex	Complex' Top 15 Albums of 2018	8	
Crack	Crack's Top 50 Albums of 2018	23	
DJ Mag	DJ Mag's Top 50 Albums of 2018	32	
Norman Records	Norman Records' Top 50 Albums of 2018	13	
Passion of the Weiss	Passion of the Weiss Top 50 Albums of 2018	26	
Piccadilly Records	Piccadilly Records' Top 100 Albums of 2018	48	
The Vinyl Factory	The Vinyl Factory's Top 50 Albums of 2018	43	
The Wire	The Wire's Top 50 Releases of 2018	35	

== Track listing ==
The Return track listing
No.	Title	Length
1.	"Salaam"	8:33
2.	"Broken Theme"	4:28
3.	"The Return"	1:06
4.	"High Roller"	3:01
5.	"Situations (Live in Milan)"	2:59
6.	"Catch the Loop"	6:54
7.	"Rhythm Commission"	2:34
8.	"Medina"	6:57
9.	"LDN Shuffle"	5:29
10.	"Aisha"	2:22
Total length:		44:23

== Personnel ==
Credits for The Return adapted from album liner notes.

- Kamaal Williams (Note: Production credited as Henry Wu) – rhodes piano, synth, production
- Pete Martin – bass
- Joshua McKenzie – drums
- Richard Samuels – production, recording, mixing

== Charts ==
Chart performance for The Return
Chart (2018)	Peak position
Belgian Albums (Ultratop Flanders)	182
Scottish Albums (Official Charts)	82
UK Albums (Official Charts)	63
UK Jazz & Blues Albums (Official Charts)	1
UK Independent Albums (Official Charts)	5
US Top Jazz Albums (Billboard)	3
