= Beats & Pieces Big Band =

British band

Beats & Pieces Big Band are a British big band who are directed by conductor and composer Ben Cottrell, and based in Manchester. They have cited Acoustic Ladyland and Radiohead as big influences, while Jazzwise wrote "they can truly claim to be a successor to Loose Tubes". In 2014 they won Jazz Ensemble of the Year at the Parliamentary Jazz Awards.

== Personnel ==
As of 2024 the band's touring lineup consists of:

- Ben Cottrell: director
- Anthony Brown, Emily Burkhardt, Oliver Dover: saxophones
- Owen Bryce, Graham South, Nick Walters: trumpet
- Simon Lodge, Rich Mcveigh, Phil O'Malley: trombone
- Anton Hunter: guitar
- Richard Jones: piano/Rhodes
- Stewart Wilson: bass
- Finlay Panter: drums

== Awards ==
- 2011: European Young Artists' Jazz Award, Burghausen, Germany
- 2014: Jazz Ensemble of the Year, Parliamentary Jazz Awards, London

== Discography ==
=== Albums ===
- Big Ideas (Efpi, 2012)
- All In (Efpi, 2015)
- Ten (Efpi, 2018)
- Good Days (Efpi, 2023)

=== EPs ===
- Beats & Pieces (2010)
