= Nick Walters (musician) =

British musician

- Genres: Jazz
- Occupation: Musician
- Website: www.nick-walters.co.uk

Nick Walters is a British trumpeter, composer and band leader. He produces music under his own name and is bandleader of Paradox Ensemble. Walters is also a member of Beats & Pieces Big Band, and Ruby Rushton.

== Early life ==
Walters grew up in Kent.

== Discography ==
=== As Nick Walters ===
- Active Imagination (22a, 2020) – with Ed Cawthorne (flute, soprano saxophone), Jeff Guntren (tenor saxophone), Rebecca Nash (piano), Nim Sadot (bass), Joseph Deenmamode (percussion), and Max Hallett (drums)
- Singularity (D.O.T, 2022)
- Padmāsana (D.O.T, 2023) – Walters (trumpet and synths) with Ed Cawthorne (flute), Kieran McLeod (trombone), and Tim Carnegie (drums)
- Marine Moods (D.O.T, 2023)

=== As leader of Paradox Ensemble ===
- Awakening (22a, 2019) – with Ed Cawthorne (flute, soprano saxophone, tenor saxophone), Sam Healey (alto saxophone), Richard Foote (trombone), Ben Kelly (sousaphone), Rebecca Nash (piano), Aidan Shepherd (accordion, synthesiser), Anton Hunter (guitar), Paul Michael (bass), Kodjovi Kush (percussion), and Jim Molyneux (drums)
- Implicate Order (D.O.T, 2021)

=== As a member of Beats and Pieces Big Band ===
- Big Ideas (Efpi, 2012)
- All In (Efpi, 2015)
- Ten (Efpi, 2018)
- Good Days (Efpi, 2023)

=== As a member of Ruby Rushton ===
- Two For Joy (22a, 2015) – Ed Cawthorne (tenor saxophone), Walters (trumpet), Aidan Shepherd (keys/synth bass), and Yussef Dayes (drums)
- Ironside (Weekertoft, 2019)
