= Tenderlonious =

British musician

Edward Cawthorne, known by the stage name Tenderlonious, is a British jazz saxophonist and flautist. He is bandleader of various jazz bands including Ruby Rushton. Cawthorne founded the record label 22a in 2013.

== Discography ==
=== As leader/co-leader ===
- The Shakedown by Tenderlonious featuring The 22archestra (22a, 2018)
- Hard Rain (22a, 2019)
- Quarantena (22a, 2020)
- Ragas From Lahore, Improvisations With Jaubi (22a, 2020)
- You Know I Care (22A, 2023)

=== Ruby Rushton ===
- Two For Joy (22a, 2015)
- Trudi's Songbook (22a, 2017)
  - Volume One
  - Volume Two
- Ironside (22a, 2019)
