= Lauren Kinsella =

Irish singer and composer

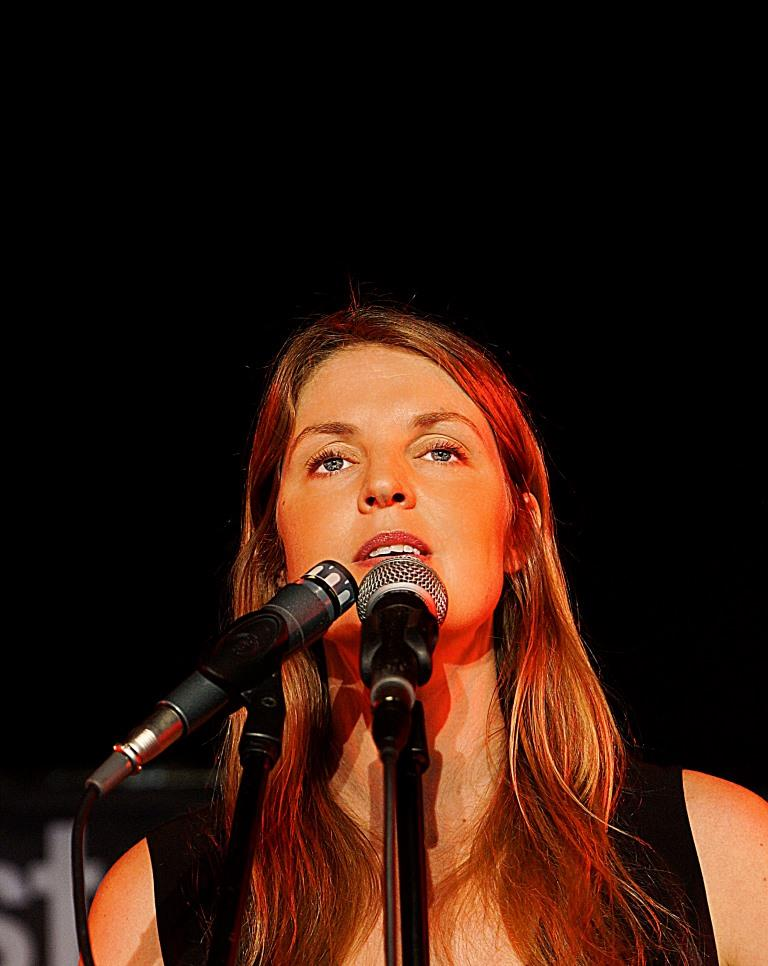

Background information
- Born: 1983 (age 42–43)
- Genres: Jazz, improvisation music
- Occupations: Musician, composer
- Instrument: Vocal
- Label: Edition Records
- Website: laurenkinsella.com

Lauren Kinsella (born 1983 in Dublin) is an Irish jazz and improvisation music singer and composer.

== Biography ==
Kinsella moved to London in 2010, where she earned her master's degree at the Royal Academy of Music in London. After singing in a duo with Sarah Buechi (Sessile Oak, 2009) she started working in the British jazz scene with Laura Jurds Chaos Orchestra (Island Mentality) and in the band Thought-Fox, among others. In 2012, she co-produced All This Talk About (Wide Ear Records) with Alex Huber. She also played in duo with saxophonist, Tom Challenger and in the sextet, Abhra led by the French saxophonist, Julien Pontvianne. In addition, she appeared in the project Somewhere in Between on the Birmingham Literature Festival with the actor Peter Campion. She also worked with Ian Wilson (I Burn for You) and in the theater project t The Last Siren. Currently (2018) she works in a duo Snowpoet with multi-instrumentalist, composer and producer Chris Hyson.

Kinsella was awarded the 2013 Kenny Wheeler Prize. In 2015, she was a scholarship holder of the Birmingham Jazzlines Fellowship. She also received commissions from BBC Radio 3 and the Marsden Jazz Festival. In 2016, she received a PRS Music Foundation for Women Make Music Award, and in 2017 a scholarship from the Arts Foundation. Kinsella teaches jazz at Leeds College of Music.

== Discography ==
With Thought-Fox

- 2013: My Guess (Diatribe), with Colm O'Hare, Tom Gibbs, Mick Coady, and Simon Roth

With Blue-Eyed Hawk

- 2014: Under the Moon (Edition), with Laura Jurd, Alex Roth, and Corrie Dick

With Snowpoet (Chris Hyson)

- 2014: Butterfly EP (Self Release)
- 2016: Snowpoet (Two Rivers)
- 2018: Thought You Knew (Edition)
- 2021: Wait For Me (Edition)
- 2025: Heartstrings (Edition)

With Julien Pontvianne, Francesco Diodati, Hannah Marshall, Alexandre Herer, and Matteo Bortone

- 2016: Abhra (Onze Heures Onze)

With Seafarers

- 2020: Orlando
- 2022: II
- 2024: Another State
