= Brownswood Recordings =

English independent record label

- Parent company: Brownswood Music
- Founded: 2006
- Founder: Gilles Peterson
- Genre: Acid jazz, funk, electronic, soul
- Country of origin: UK
- Location: London, England
- Official website: Brownswood Recordings

Brownswood Recordings is a London-based independent record label founded by Gilles Peterson in 2006. The label has released an eclectic range of music, reflecting Peterson's diverse musical taste.

The roster includes Oreglo, Ben Westbeech, Ghostpoet, José James, Skinny Pelembe, Mala, The Heritage Orchestra, Anushka, Gang Colours, Daymé Arocena, Yussef Kamaal, Shabaka and the Ancestors, and Zara McFarlane.

Warner Music UK and Brownswood Recordings announced details of a new joint venture. The first release under the joint venture was the drummer and producer Yussef Dayes’ debut solo album, Black Classical Music.
