= Josienne Clarke =

British musician

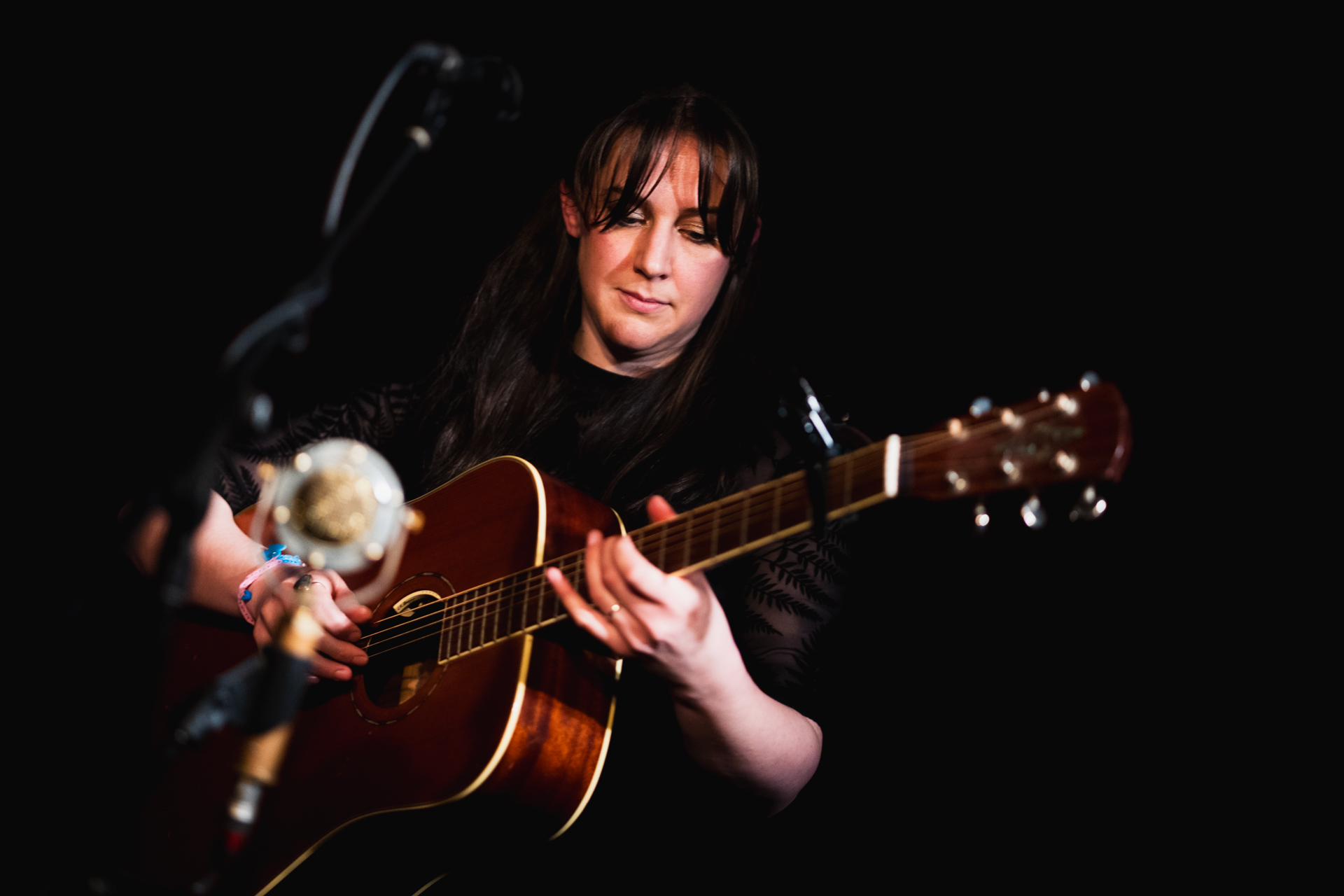
- Josienne Clarke performing in 2026

Background information
- Born: 1982 (age 43–44)
- Genres: indie-folk; folk
- Occupations: Musician, singer-songwriter, composer
- Instruments: Vocals; guitar
- Years active: 2008–present
- Labels: Rough Trade Records; Corduroy Punk Records
- Website: josienneclarke.com

Josienne Clarke (1982- ) is an English singer-songwriter. She was part of a duo with guitarist Ben Walker until 2019 when she had a band called Picapica. In the same year she went solo.

== Music career ==
From 2009 until 2018 she formed a duo with guitarist Ben Walker, winning a BBC Radio 2 Folk Award for best duo in 2017, and signing with music label Rough Trade Records, with whom she made six duo albums, one record with her band PicaPica and her solo record ‘In All Weather’ in 2019. She also recorded an EP ‘Such A Sky’ with jazz pianist Kit Downes in 2017. She has toured world-wide and has supported folk musician Richard Thompson on one of his tours.

In 2019 she formed a band called PicaPica. The band recorded a studio album called Together & Apart. The Financial Times wrote in 2019 she was "recognised as a rising star of British folk". She subsequently signed with the label Corduroy Punk Records to bring out more solo albums.

Of her 2023 solo album Onliness (which is a re-recording of some previous work), Folkradio wrote: "a graceful melancholy in the melodies and a bird-like fragility to her singing coating an underlayer of grit and menace you would be foolish to ignore".

== Discography ==
=== Studio albums ===
Year	Title	Credited to
2010	One Light Is Gone	solo
2011	The Seas Are Deep	Clarke & Walker
2012	Homemade Heartache	Clarke & Walker
2013	Fire & Fortune	Clarke & Walker
2013	Midwinter	Clarke & Walker
2014	Nothing Can Bring Back the Hour	Clarke & Walker
2016	Overnight	Clarke & Walker
2017	Such a Sky	Clarke & Downes
2017	The Birds	Clarke & Walker
2018	Seedlings All	Clarke & Walker
2018	Last Night	Clarke & Walker
2019	Together & Apart	PicaPica
2019	In All Weather	solo
2021	A Small Unknowable Thing	solo
2022	I Promised You Light	solo
2022	Now And Then	solo
2023	Onliness – Songs of Solitude & Singularity	solo
2024	Parenthesis, I	solo
2025	Far from Nowhere	solo
