= Whirlwind Recordings =

British independent record label

- Founded: 2010
- Founder: Michael Janisch
- Distributors: Proper, Indigo, The Planet Company, Bertus, Distrijaz
- Genre: Jazz, experimental, world
- Country of origin: U.K.
- Location: London, England
- Official website: whirlwindrecordings.com

Whirlwind Recordings is a London, UK-based independent record label established in 2010 by Michael Janisch.

== History ==
The label was founded in 2010 by bassist, composer, educator and producer Michael Janisch in order to release his debut solo album Purpose Built.

== Whirlwind Festival ==
In October 2013, Whirlwind Recordings held the Whirlwind Festival. The festival ran from October 10–12 at Kings Place in London. Among its 18 bands and 86 musicians were Andre Canniere, Greg Osby, Mike Gibbs, Norma Winstone, Robert Mitchell, and Logan Richardson.
