= Priority Records discography =

The following is a partial list of albums released through Priority Records. Any additional record labels involved are specified in brackets.

== 1970s ==
=== 1976 ===
- Funkadelic – Hardcore Jollies (53873)

=== 1978 ===
- Funkadelic – One Nation Under A Groove (53872)

=== 1979 ===
- Funkadelic – Uncle Jam Wants You (53875)
- Juluka – Universal Men (57144)

== 1980s ==
=== 1980 ===
- Carole King – Pearls: Songs Of Goffin & King (53879)

=== 1981 ===
- Funkadelic – The Electric Spanking Of War Babies (53874)
- Juluka – African Litany (57145)
- Radio Kings – It Ain't Easy (50535)

=== 1982 ===
- Juluka – Scatterlings Of Africa (50594)
- Juluka – Ubuhle Bemvelo (57146)

=== 1984 ===
- Armored Saint – March of the Saint (50541)
- Juluka – Musa Ukungilandela (57149)

=== 1985 ===
- Armored Saint – Delirious Nomad (50539)
- The Showboys – The Ten Laws of Rap / Cold Frontin (PRO-7074)

=== 1986 ===
- The Showboys – Drag Rap (PRO-7111)

=== 1987 ===
- Greatest Hits Of The Street – Rappin' and Scratchin' (4XL-9469)
- The California Raisins – The California Raisins Sing the Hit Songs (51340)
- Armored Saint – Raising Fear (50540)

=== 1988 ===
- Big Lady K – Bigger Than Life (57109)
- Eazy-E – Eazy-Duz-It (57100)
- Eazy-E – Eazy-Duz-It "Edit Version" (57111)
- EPMD – Strictly Business (57135)
- Geto Boys – Making Trouble (57134)

=== 1989 ===
- Awesome Dre And The Hardcore Committee – You Can't Hold Me Back (57114)
- EPMD – Unfinished Business (57136)
- Geto Boys – Grip It! On That Other Level (57190)
- Low Profile – We're In This Together (57116)
- N.W.A – N.W.A and the Posse (57119) (reissue)
- N.W.A – Straight Outta Compton (57102)
- N.W.A – Straight Outta Compton "Edit Version" (57112)
- Nice & Smooth – Nice & Smooth (53887)
- Willie Dee – Controversy (57133)

== 1990s ==
=== 1990 ===
- Bobby Jimmy & The Critters – Hip Hop Prankster (57117)
- Cheb Mami – Let Me Rai (57142)
- Choice – The Big Payback (57132)
- David Hewitt – The Storyteller (57176)
- Goo Goo Dolls – Hold Me Up (53917)
- Gwar – Scumdogs of the Universe (53904)
- Ice Cube – AmeriKKKa's Most Wanted (57120)
- Ice Cube – AmeriKKKa's Most Wanted "Edit Version" (57130)
- Ice Cube – Kill At Will EP
- N.W.A – 100 Miles and Runnin' EP
- Ozzy Osbourne – Ten Commandments (57129)
- Tres – Hold On To Your Dreams (57113)
- Y&T – Yesterday & Today Live (53924)

=== 1991 ===
- 415 – 41Fivin' (57153)
- Armored Saint – Symbol of Salvation (53923)
- Bongo Logic – Despierta (57141)
- Convict – Convicts (57152)
- David Hewitt – An African Tapestry (57140)
- Edward II – Wicked Men (57178)
- Geto Boys – We Can't Be Stopped (57161)
- Geto Boys – We Can't Be Stopped "Edit Version" (57171)
- Fates Warning – Parallels (53918)
- Ice Cube – Death Certificate (57155)
- The Itals – Easy To Catch (57159)
- Juluka – The Best Of Juluka (57138)
- KMC – Three Men With The Power Of Ten (57122)
- Manfred Mann's Plain Music – Plain Music (57123)
- Manazart – Too Much Pressure (57154)
- N.W.A – Niggaz4Life (57126)
- O.G. Style – I Know How To Play 'Em! (57151)
- Scarface – Mr. Scarface Is Back (57167)
- Scarface – Mr. Scarface Is Back "Edit Version" (57182)
- The Terrorists – Terror Strikes: Always Bizness, Never Personal (57173)
- Tres – Dejame Sentir Tu Amor (57118)
- WC and the Maad Circle – Ain't a Damn Thang Changed (57156)
- WC & The Maad Circle – Ain't a Damn Thang Changed "Edit Version" (57169)

=== 1992 ===
- 415 – Nu Niggaz on Tha Blokkk (57163)
- Barefoot – Dance Of Life (57125)
- Big Mello – Bone Hard ziggiN (57175)
- Bushwick Bill – Little Big Man (57189)
- Choice – Stick N Moove (57172)
- Dr. Dre – The Chronic (57128)
- Eazy-E – 5150: Home 4 Tha Sick EP (53815)
- Ganksta NIP – The South Park Psycho (57160)
- Geto Boys – Uncut Dope: Geto Boys' Best (57183)
- Geto Boys – Uncut Dope: Geto Boys' Best "Edit Version" (57196)
- Gwar – America Must Be Destroyed (53906)
- Ice Cube – The Predator (57185)
- Ice Cube – The Predator "Edit Version" (57198)
- JT The Bigga Figga – Don't Stop til We Major (50574)
- Maestro Alex Gregory – Paganini's Last Stand (57158)
- MC Ren – Kizz My Black Azz EP (53802)
- Mod Squad – People's Park (57157)
- Penthouse Player's Clique – Paid The Cost (57181)
- Prince Johnny C – It's Been A Long Rhyme Coming (57179)
- Raheem – The Invincible (57180)
- Seagram – The Dark Roads (57192)
- Skrew – Burning in Water, Drowning in Flame (53919)
- Slammin' Gladys – Slammin' Gladys (57162)
- Sons Of Selassie – Changes (57170)
- Too Much Trouble – Bringing Hell On Earth (57174)
- Willie Dee – I'm Goin' Out Lika Soldier (57188)

=== 1993 ===
- 2Low – Funky Lil' Brotha (53884)
- 5th Ward Boyz – Ghetto Dope (53859)
- Bass Hit – Bass Is Loaded (50598)
- Bass Quake – Bass Quake (50614)
- Carole King – Colour Of Your Dreams (57197)
- Carole King – In Concert (53878)
- The Conscious Daughters – Ear to the Street (53877)
- DMG – Rigormortiz (53862)
- Ganksta NIP – Psychic Thoughts (53860)
- Geto Boys – Till Death Do Us Part (57191)
- Ice Cube – Lethal Injection (53876)
- Ice Cube – Lethal Injection "Edit Version" (53888)
- Ice-T – Home Invasion (53858)
- Johnny Clegg & Savuka – In My African Dream (53912)
- Joyfinger – Pimps Of Babylon (53868)
- JT The Bigga Figga – Playaz N the Game (50554)
- Mercyful Fate – In the Shadows (53892)
- Sam Kinison – Live from Hell (53863)
- Sat N Smooth – The Awakening (53869)
- Scarface – The World Is Yours (53861)
- Too Much Trouble – Player's Choice (57186)

=== 1994 ===
- 5th Ward Boyz – Gangsta Funk EP (53844)
- Arson Garden – The Belle Stomp (53894)
- Bakamono – The Cry Of The Turkish Fig Peddler (53949)
- Bass Shock – Dungeon Of Bass (50600)
- Big Mello – Wegonefunkwichamind (53897)
- Big Mike – Somethin' Serious (53907)
- Blac Monks – Secrets of the Hidden Temple (53898)
- Carole King – Time Gone By (53880)
- Da Lench Mob – Planet of da Apes (53939)
- Dieselmeat – Happily (53893)
- Don Jagwarr – Faded (53926)
- Engines Of Aggression – Inhuman Nature (53883)
- Fates Warning – Inside Out (53915)
- Flycatcher – Ovulation (53895)
- Foreigner – Mr. Moonlight (53961)
- Foreskin 500 – Manpussy (53899)
- Get Low Playaz – Straight Out Tha Labb (50555)
- Gwar – The Road Behind EP (53905)
- Gwar – This Toilet Earth (53889)
- Ice Cube – Bootlegs & B-Sides (53921)
- Lil 1/2 Dead – The Dead Has Arisen (53937)
- Mad Flava – From Tha Ground Unda (57199)
- Magnapop – Hot Boxing (53909)
- Mercyful Fate – The Bell Witch EP (53911)
- Mercyful Fate – Time (53942)
- Odd Squad – Fadanuf Fa Erybody!! (53866)
- Pauly Shore – Pink Diggily Diggily (53881)
- Paris – Guerrilla Funk (53882)
- Paris – Guerrilla Funk "Edit Version" (53931)
- San Quinn – Live N Direct (53982)
- Seagram – Reality Check (53908)
- Skrew – Dusted (53902)
- Tim Smooth – Straight Up Drivin' Em (53891)
- Timco – Friction Tape (53900)

=== 1995 ===
- Al Kapone – Da Ressurrection (50528)
- Bass Connection – Hi Voltage Bass (50599)
- Bass Erotica – Sexual Bass (50622)
- Bluebirds – Swamp Stomp (50534)
- Boyz Of Paradize – Boyz Of Paradize (53989)
- Brotha Lynch Hung – Season of da Siccness (53967)
- Buccinator – Great Painter Rafael (53951)
- The B.U.M.S. – Lyfe 'N' Tyme (53886)
- C-Funk – Three Dimensional Ear Pleasure (53971)
- Cold World Hustlers – Iceland (53990)
- Christopher Cross – Window (53960)
- Curtis Salgado – More Than You Can Chew (53930)
- Don McMinn – Painkiller Blues (50566)
- E.S.G. – Sailin' Da South (53973)
- Eazy-E – Eternal E (50544)
- Grip Inc. – Power of Inner Strength (53964)
- Gwar – Ragnarök (50527)
- JT the Bigga Figga – Dwellin' in tha Labb (53981)
- King Diamond – The Spider's Lullabye (53965)
- Mack 10 – Mack 10 (53938)
- Margi Coleman – Margi (53903)
- Master P – 99 Ways To Die (53979)
- Mia X – Good Girl Gone Bad (53988)
- Mr. Doctor – Setripn' Bloccstyle (53975)
- Radio Kings – Live At B.B. King's (50530)
- Sham & The Professor – Split Personalities (53941)
- Sons of Elvis – Glodean (53896)
- Tha Dogg Pound – Dogg Food (50546)
- Tony Sarno – It's A Blues Thing (50524)
- Trinity Garden Cartel – Don't Blame It On Da Music (53890)
- TRU – True (53983)
- Watts Gangstas – The Real (53986)

=== 1996 ===
- 20-2-Life – Twenty Two Life (50682)
- Ace Deuce – Comin' Up N' Da Ghetto (50567)
- Adults – Action Street (50584)
- Bass Connection – Drivin' Bass (50615)
- Bass Cult – The Dark Side (50624)
- Bass Erotica – Bass Ecstacy (50616)
- Bass Erotica – Erotic Bass Delight (50601)
- Bass Hit – Sub Shaker (50628)
- Bass Quake – Bass After Shock (50620)
- Bluebirds – South From Memphis (50575)
- Cellmates – Stories Of Tha Damned (50568)
- Christopher Franke – Celestine Prophecy (50571)
- Cold Blue Steel – Headed Out Of Memphis (50523)
- The Conscious Daughters – Gamers (53994)
- The Conscious Daughters – Gamers "Edit Version" (50549)
- Cutty Ranks – Six Million Ways to Die (53871)
- Engines Of Aggression – Speak EP (53804)
- Foe – Scissorhands (50582)
- Foreskin 500 – Starbent But Superfreaked (50526)
- Gary B.B. Coleman – Cocaine Annie (50580)
- Get Some Crew – 1-900-Get-Some (50596)
- Heltah Skeltah – Nocturnal (50532)
- Heltah Skeltah – Nocturnal "Edit Version" (50637)
- Ice-T – Ice-T VI: Return of the Real (53933)
- J-Mack – Crime Rate (50572)
- Jay-Z – Reasonable Doubt (50592)
- Jay-Z – Reasonable Doubt "Edit Version" (50041)
- Karen Domino White & Friends – Open Our Eyes (50629)
- King Diamond – The Graveyard (50587)
- Lil 1/2 Dead – Steel on a Mission (53984)
- Magic City DJ's – 2 Much Bass (50632)
- Magnapop – Rubbing Doesn't Help (53992)
- Marilyns – Fumbled By Karma (50536)
- Master P – Ice Cream Man (53978)
- Me & My Cousin – International (53558)
- The Memphis Horns – Wishing You A Merry Christmas (50630)
- Mercyful Fate – Into The Unknown (50586)
- Mr. Ill – The Rebirth (50638)
- N.W.A – Greatest Hits (50561)
- No Good But So Good – Up To No Good (50647)
- Originoo Gunn Clappaz – Da Storm (50577)
- Ras Kass – Soul on Ice (50529)
- San Quinn – Hustle Continues (50573)
- Seff Tha Gaffla – Livin' Kinda Lavish (53980)
- Sh'Killa – Gangstrez From Da Bay (50558)
- Silkk The Shocker – The Shocker (50591)
- Skull Duggery – Hoodlum fo' Life (50543)
- Skrew – Shadow Of Doubt (50559)
- Westside Connection – Bow Down (50583)
- Westside Connection – Bow Down "Edit Version" (50650)
- Wreckless Klan – Blowin' Up Tha Scene (50686)
- X Members – Down With The Average Joe (50542)
- Young Murder Squad – How We Livin' (50557)

=== 1997 ===
- Ant Banks – Big Thangs (50698)
- Ant Banks – Big Thangs "Edit Version" (50735)
- Boot Camp Clik – For The People (50646)
- Boot Camp Clik – For The People "Edit Version" (50706)
- Brotha Lynch Hung – Loaded (50648)
- Company Flow – Funcrusher Plus (50063)
- D-Flexx – Planet Playa (50678)
- The Delinquents – Big Moves (50680)
- DJ Taz – Worldwide (50736)
- DJ Taz – Worldwide "Edit Version" (50737)
- Heltah Skeltah – Magnum Force (53543)
- Heltah Skeltah – Magnum Force "Limited Edition" (50023)
- Ice Cube – Featuring...Ice Cube
- Kane & Abel – 7 Sins (50634)
- Killarmy – Silent Weapons for Quiet Wars (50633)
- Kock D.Zel – Dreams II Reality (50602)
- Mack 10 – Based on a True Story (50675)
- Mack 10 – Based On A True Story "Edit Version" (50748)
- Mark May – Telephone Road (50690)
- Master P – Ghetto D (50659)
- Master P – Ghetto D "Edit Version" (50749)
- Mia X – Unlady Like (50705)
- Mr. Serv-On – Life Insurance (50717)
- Organized Konfusion – The Equinox (50560)
- Organized Konfusion – The Equinox "Edit Version" (50734)
- Phobos – Phobos (50072)
- Point Blank – N Tha Do' (50701)
- PSK-13 – Born Bad? (50746)
- Steady Mobb'n – Pre-Meditated Drama (50704)
- Stephen Simmonds – Simmonds Alone (50054)
- Tha Truth – Makin' Moves... Everyday (50553)
- Tha Truth – Makin' Moves... Everyday "Edit Version" (50649)
- Timco – Gentleman Jim (50525)
- TRU – Tru 2 da Game (50660)

=== 1998 ===
- AllFrumTha I – Allfrumtha I (50588)
- AllFrumTha I – AllFrumTha I "Edit Version" (53537)
- Anotha Level – On Anotha Level (53867)
- Bad Azz – Word on tha Streets (50741)
- Big Ed – The Assassin (50729)
- Black Star – Mos Def & Talib Kweli Are Black Star (50065)
- C-Loc – Ya Heard Me (50732)
- C-Murder – Life Or Death (50723)
- C-Murder – Life Or Death "Edit Version" (53540)
- Cocoa Brovaz – The Rude Awakening (50699)
- Concentration Camp – Da Halocaust (53536)
- Daz Dillinger – Retaliation, Revenge and Get Back (53524)
- Fiend – There's One in Every Family (50715)
- Full Blooded – Memorial Day (50027)
- Gangsta Profile – Fire Redrum (50645)
- Gambino Family – Ghetto Organized (50718)
- Ghetto Commission – Wise Guys (50011)
- Ice Cube – War & Peace Vol. 1 (The War Disc) (50700)
- Ice Cube – War & Peace Vol. 1 (The War Disc) "Edit Version" (50022)
- Kane & Abel – Am I My Brother's Keeper (50720)
- Killarmy – Dirty Weaponry (50014)
- Mac – Shell Shocked (50727)
- Mack 10 – The Recipe (53512)
- Mack 10 – The Recipe "Edit Version" (53549)
- Magic – Sky's The Limit (50017)
- Master P – MP Da Last Don (53538)
- Master P – MP Da Last Don "Edit Version" (53548)
- Master P – The Ghettos Tryin To kill Me!: Limited Edition (50696)
- Mia X – Mama Drama (53502)
- Mia X – Mama Drama "Edit Version" (50049)
- Michel'le – Hung Jury (53530)
- Mr. Quikk – 69 Wayz (50024)
- NuSound – Erotic Moods Vol. 1
- Pish Posh – Up Jumps The Boogie (50067)
- Prime Suspects – Guilty 'til Proven Innocent (50728)
- Ras Kass – Rasassination (50739)
- Silkk The Shocker – Charge It 2 Da Game (50716)
- Silkk The Shocker – Charge It 2 Da Game "Edit Version" (53541)
- Snoop Dogg – Da Game Is to Be Sold, Not to Be Told (50000)
- Snoop Dogg – Da Game Is To Be Sold, Not To Be Told "Edit Version" (50006)
- Spasmik – Phunkotron (53529)
- Spirit Level – Of Earth And Sky (50009)
- Sons Of Funk – The Game of Funk (50725)
- Soulja Slim – Give It 2 'Em Raw (53547)
- Steady Mobb'n – Black Mafia (50026)
- Various artist – Straight Outta Compton: N.W.A 10th Anniversary Tribute (53532)
- Various artist – Straight Outta Compton: N.W.A 10th Anniversary Tribute "Edit Version" (50025)
- Wu-Tang Killa Bees – The Swarm Vol. 1 (50013)
- Young Bleed – My Balls and My Word (50738)

=== 1999 ===
- 5th Ward Boyz – P.W.A. The Album... Keep It Poppin' (50125)
- Big Mike – Hard to Hit (50104)
- Black Moon – War Zone (50039)
- C-Murder – Bossalinie (50035)
- C-Murder – Bossalinie "Edit Version" (50036)
- Chilldrin of da Ghetto – Chilldrin of da Ghetto (50020)
- Choclair – Ice Cold (50151)
- CJ Mac – Platinum Game (53533)
- Company Flow – Little Johnny From The Hospitul: Breaks And Instrumentals, Vol. 1 (50101)
- DB Bass Killaz – Bass Drag Racing (50059)
- DJ Dara – Renegade Continuum (50066)
- DJ Dara – Renegade Continuum 2 (50068)
- DJ Spinna – Heavy Beats Vol. 1 (50070)
- Fiend – Street Life (50107)
- The High & Mighty – Home Field Advantage (50121)
- The High & Mighty – Home Field Advantage "Edit Version" (50136)
- JT Money – Pimpin' on Wax (50060)
- JT Money – Pimpin' On Wax "Edit Version" (50105)
- Kacino – Life Is A Gamble (50075)
- Lil Italy – On Top of da World (50108)
- Lil Soldiers – Boot Camp (50038)
- Mac – World War III (50109)
- Magic – Thuggin' (50110)
- Master P – Only God Can Judge Me (50092)
- Master P – Only God Can Judge Me "Edit Version" (50091)
- MC Eiht – Section 8 (50021)
- Mercedes – Rear End (50085)
- Mo B. Dick – Gangsta Harmony (50721)
- Mos Def – Black On Both Sides (50141)
- Mos Def – Black On Both Sides "Edit Version" (50142)
- Mr. Mike – Rhapsody (50031)
- Mr. Serv-On – Da Next Level (50045)
- NuSound – Erotic Moods Vol. 2 (50144)
- Originoo Gunn Clappaz – The M-Pire Shrikez Back (50116)
- Pharoahe Monch – Internal Affairs (50137)
- Pharoahe Monch – Internal Affairs "Edit Version" (50138)
- Shyheim – Manchild (50058)
- Silkk The Shocker – Made Man (50003)
- Silkk The Shocker – Made Man "Edit Version" (50037)
- Snoop Dogg – No Limit Top Dogg (50052)
- Snoop Dogg – No Limit Top Dogg "Edit Version" (50080)
- TRU – Da Crime Family (50010)
- TRU – Da Crime Family "Edit Version" (50094)
- U-God – Golden Arms Redemption (50086)
- Wu-Syndicate – Wu-Syndicate (50056)

== 2000s ==
=== 2000 ===
- 504 Boyz – Goodfellas (50722)
- 504 Boyz – Goodfellas "Edit Version" (50093)
- Big L – The Big Picture (7243 5 26136) [Rawkus]
- C-Murder – Trapped in Crime (50083)
- The Comrads – Wake Up & Ball (50001)
- Dame Grease – Live On Lenox (50112)
- Easy Mo Bee – Now Or Never: Odyssey 2000 (53521)
- Ice Cube – War & Peace Vol. 2 (The Peace Disc) (50015)
- Ice Cube – War & Peace Vol. 2 (The Peace Disc) "Edit Version" (50046)
- Lil' Romeo – Lil' Romeo (50198)
- Lil' Zane – Young World: The Future (50145)
- Mack 10 – The Paper Route (50148)
- Mack 10 – The Paper Route "Edit Version" (50149)
- MC Eiht – N' My Neighborhood (50103)
- Mr. Marcelo – Brick Livin' (7243 5 26159) [No Limit]
- Sauce Money – Middle Finger U (7243 5 24031)
- Snoop Dogg – Tha Last Meal (50153)
- Toni Estes – Two Eleven (50150)
- Young Bleed – My Own (50018)

=== 2001 ===
- Bad Azz – Personal Business (50076)
- C-Murder – C-P-3.com (50178)
- Da Beatminerz – Brace 4 Impak (7243 5 26168) [Rawkus]
- Hi-Tek – Hi-Teknology (50171)
- Krazy – Breather Life
- NuSound – Erotic Moods Vol. 3 (50160)
- Pish Posh – Indoor Storm (50163)
- Sarina Paris – Sarina Paris (50175)
- Silkk the Shocker – My World, My Way (7243 5 23221) [No Limit]
- Smut Peddlers – Porn Again (50164)
- Snoop Doggy Dogg – Death Row: Snoop Doggy Dogg at His Best (50030)
- Snoop Doggy Dogg – Death Row: Snoop Doggy Dogg at His Best "Edit Version" (50032)
- Soulja Slim – The Streets Made Me (NLS200) [No Limit South]
- Svala – The Real Me (50099)

=== 2002 ===
- Big Moe – Purple World (50244)
- Snoop Dogg – Paid tha Cost to Be da Boss (7243 5 39157) [Doggy Style]

=== 2003 ===
- Lil' Zane – The Big Zane Theory (50191)
- Roscoe – Young Roscoe Philaphornia (7243 5 28291)
- Westside Connection – Terrorist Threats (7243 5 24030) [Hoo Bangin']

=== 2009 ===
- Snoop Dogg – Malice n Wonderland

== 2010's ==
=== 2010 ===
- Cypress Hill – Rise Up
- Snoop Dogg – More Malice

=== 2011 ===
- Snoop Dogg – Doggumentary

=== 2017 ===
- Ripp Flamez – Project Melodies
- Various artists – Grow House (Original Motion Picture Soundtrack)
- G Perico – All Blue
- Various Artists – Rap Game–The Final Performance
- Jake&Papa – Tattoos&Blues
- A.D. & Sorry Jaynari – Last Of The '80s
- Tia London – Tia London

== Compilations and soundtracks ==
- Various Artists – Dance Around The World (57143)
- Various Artists – Planet Reggae: The World Of Reggae Music (57164)
- Various Artists – Planet Zouk: The World Of Antilles Music (57165)
- Various Artists – Planet Africa: The World Of African Music (57166)
- Various Artists – Rap A Lot's Underground Masters (57168)
- Various Artists – Spirit Of Venice, CA: A Collection Of Venice Street Musicians (57177)
- Various Artists – Rap A Lot's Underground Masters "Edit Version" (57184)
- Various Artists – Planet Blues: The World Of Blues Rock (57193)
- Various Artists – Old School Friday (57194)
- Various Artists – Planet Dancehall: The World Of Raggamuffin (57195)
- Various Artists – Straight From Da Streets Vol. 1 (53885)
- Various Artists – Classic Beats And Breaks Vol. 1 (53910)
- Various Artists – Classic Beats And Breaks Vol. 2 (53922)
- Various Artists – Guitars That Rule The World (53925)
- Various Artists – Street Fighter (53948)
- Various Artists – Extreme Velocity (53952)
- Various Artists – Luminescence (53954)
- Various Artists – Trance Ambient (53956)
- Various Artists – Friday (53959)
- Various Artists – Blackmarket Unreleased (53966)
- Various Artists – Friday "Edit Version" (53974)
- Various Artists – Classic Beats And Breaks Vol. 3 (53998)
- Various Artists – Classic Beats And Breaks Vol. 4 (53999)
- Various Artists – Bio Dome (50552)
- Various Artists – Masters Of Blues (50569)
- Various Artists – Brutal Bass: 60 Minutes Of Bass (50570)
- Various Artists – Down South Hustlers (53993)
- Various Artists – Cell Block Compilation (50556)
- Various Artists – In The Beginning... There Was Rap (50639)
- Various Artists – I'm Bout It (50643)
- Various Artists – The Substitute (50576)
- Various Artists – Guitars That Rule The World Vol. 2 (50589)
- Various Artists – Young Southern Playaz Vol. 1 (50590)
- Various Artists – Above The Rim (50606)
- Various Artists – Above The Rim "Edit Version" (50607)
- Various Artists – Murder Was The Case (50610)
- Various Artists – Gang Related (53509)
- Various Artists – Bass 4 Bassheadz: Vol. 2 (50597)
- Various Artists – Bass 4 Bassheadz: Vol. 1 (50619)
- Various Artists – Bass 4 Bassheadz: Vol. 3 (50626)
- Various Artists – Trip Hop Nation Vol. 1 (50631)
- Various Artists – Rhyme & Reason (50635)
- Various Artists – Bass 4 Bassheadz: Vol. 4 (50636)
- Various Artists – West Coast Bad Boyz Vol. 2 (50658)
- Various Artists – Death Row Greatest Hits (50677)
- Various Artists – Young Southern Playaz Vol. 2 (50687)
- Various Artists – Trip Hop Til U Drop (50679)
- Various Artists – Luke's Peep Show Compilation Vol. 1 (50681)
- Various Artists – Booty Bass Mix Vol. 1 (50692)
- Various Artists – West Coast Bad Boyz: Anotha Level Of The game (50695)
- Various Artists – The Best Of Black Market Records: Hounds Of Tha Underground (50697)
- Various Artists – Ultimate Bass Challenge Vol. 1 (50043)
- Various Artists – Electro: Breaks Beats And Bass (50012)
- Various Artists – Booty Party Ta' Go (50028)
- Various Artists – Thicker Than Water (50016)
- Various Artists – Thicker Than Water "Edit Version" (50047)
- Various Artists – No Limit Soldiers Compilation: We Can't Be Stopped "Edit Version" (50048)
- Various Artists – Foolish (50053)
- Various Artists – Lyricist Lounge Vol. 1 (50062)
- Various Artists – Soundbombing I (50064)
- Various Artists – Soundbombing II "Edit Version" (50074)
- Various Artists – Soundbombing II (50069)
- Various Artists – Foolish "Edit Version" (50071)
- Various Artists – Old School Ghetto Booty (50078)
- Various Artists – Pure Flamenco (50079)
- Various Artists – Bass 4 Bassheadz: Vol. 5 (50100)
- Various Artists – Duck Down Presents (50117)
- Various Artists – 3 Strikes (50118)
- Various Artists – J Prince Presents: R.N.D.S. (50119)
- Various Artists – World Wrestling Federation Presents: Aggression (50120)
- Various Artists – Ultimate Bass Challenge Vol. 2 (50122)
- Various Artists – J Prince Presents: R.N.D.S. "Edit Version" (50123)
- Various Artists – Book of Shadows: Blair Witch 2 (50155)
- Various Artists – The Perfect Trance (50162)
- Various Artists – Ozzfest: Second Stage Live (50197)
- Various Artists – Boot Camp Clik's Greatest Hits: Basic Training (7243 5 23052)
- Various Artists – Hip Hop For Respect (7243 8 38712) [Rawkus]
- Various Artists – Suge Knight Represents: Chronic 2000 (51161) [Death Row]
- Various Artists – Training Day (50213)
- Various Artists – Bones soundtrack (50227)
- Various Artists – Holiday Moods Vol. 2: Another Enchanted Christmas (53328) [Neurodisc]
- Various Artists – Lyricist Lounge Vol. 2 (7243 5 26131) [Rawkus]
- Various Artists – Mean Green: Major Players Compilation (53505)
- Various Artists – Latino Latino: Music From The Streets Of L.A. (57139)
- Various Artists – Rhythm Safari: The Best Of World Music (57137)
