= Here Comes the Rot =

...Here Comes the Rot!

Studio album by éVoid
- Released: December 1986
- Recorded: Summer of 1986
- Studios: SAV Studios, London
- Genres: Electronic, New wave, Post-punk
- Length: 40:55
- Labels: WEA, Seed Music
- Producers: Greg Cutler & éVoid

ÉVoid chronology
ÉVoid (1983)	...Here Comes the Rot! (1986)	E-VOID/London Kazet (1993)

Here Comes the Rot (stylized as ...Here Comes the Rot!) is the second studio album by South African rock group, éVoid. It was the first album recorded by the band after their move from Johannesburg to London.

The band had relocated to London in 1985 to avoid the mandatory conscription in Apartheid South Africa, and to break into the international market after the success of their self-titled debut. The album was a lot more experimental than their debut with more punk influence on songs like Altar Pop, and while it was well received the band did not reach the impact and fame they had in South Africa.

== Background ==
After the release of their debut and the success of the singles Shadows and Taximan which reached number 3 and 6 on the national charts, respectively.

The band had also won Best Arrangement and Production of an Album for the album and the single I am a Fadget won Best Contemporary Artist at the 1984 South African Music Awards.

The following year they played at the Concert in the Park, a benefit concert to aid Operation Hunger at the Ellis Park Stadium along with other notable artists such as Johnny Clegg's band Juluka and Brenda Fassie

However the band faced challenges due to the politics of Apartheid South Africa with the South African Defence Force (who had previously conscripted drummer Wayne Harker) now conscripting the Windrich brothers for their compulsory two year national service. The band also felt their success was inhibited and wanted to break out to the international market. The brothers subsequently moved to London and began work on their next album throughout 1986

== Writing and recording ==
The album was produced by both the band and South African engineer Greg Cutler at SAV Studios in London. The album had a more mature sound with regards to musical style and lyrically than their debut, benefitting from the albums improved production. The song Altar Pop is an example of the bands punk influences and rebelliousness with the album title "Here Comes the Rot" appearing as lyrics on the song.

The B- Side is more melancholic and slower with songs such as Shuffle in the Dust and "Winter, an instrumental track which leads into the closing track Here Comes the Rain. Later CD reissues would include bonus tracks such as Kwela Walk and Telem and Godon which originally appeared as the B-side to the 12" single release of I am a Fadget and other songs which would appear on their subsequent album E-VOID.

== Release and reception ==
WEA released the album along with the singles Dance the Instinct and Sgt. Major which coincided with the band's 6 week tour, returning to South Africa. Afterwards the band would regularly perform at the Springbok Bar in Covent Gardens with Wayne Harker leaving to form the band Askari. In the coming years they would be joined by bassist Ilne Hofmeyr and drummer Richard Devey.

The band played on and off shows with a third album, released as a cassette titled E-VOID (later renamed London Kazet) in 1993. Afterwards the band would eventually go on hiatus as the Windrich brothers wanted to focus on their families. The band reunited with original drummer George Voros in 2008 for the album Graffiti Lounge.

== Track listing ==
=== Original LP release ===
All music is composed by Erik and Lucien Windrich. Additional lyrics on “Sangoma” – Kay.

Side one
No.	Title	Length
1.	"Dance the Instinct"	4:29
2.	"Fashion War"	3:43
3.	"Under My Feet"	3:53
4.	"Sgt. Major"	3:33
5.	"Altar Pop"	3:56
Total length:		19:34

Side 2
No.	Title	Length
1.	"Shelter Me"	4:15
2.	"Sangoma"	4:56
3.	"Shuffle in the Dust"	4:53
4.	"Winter"	4:29
5.	"Here Comes the Rain"	2:48
Total length:		21:21 40:55

=== 2008, Seed Music, SEED 115 CD release with bonus tracks ===
No.	Title	Length
1.	"Dance the Instinct"	4:29
2.	"Fashion War"	3:43
3.	"Under My Feet"	3:53
4.	"Sgt. Major"	3:33
5.	"Altar Pop"	3:56
6.	"Shelter Me"	4:15
7.	"Sangoma"	4:56
8.	"Shuffle in the Dust"	4:53
9.	"Winter"	4:29
10.	"Here Comes the Rain"	2:48
Total length:		40:55

Bonus tracks
No.	Title	Notes	Length
1.	"Kwela Walk"	Originally appeared as a B-side to "I am a Fadget" along with Tellem and Godon	2:53
2.	"Tellem and Godon"		6:15
3.	"Civil Servant"	Originally appeared on E-VOID/ London Kazet	4:28
4.	"Shoes"	Originally appeared on E-VOID/ London Kazet	3:42
5.	"Ordinary Life"	Originally appeared on E-VOID/ London Kazet	4:10
Total length:			21:28 62:23

== Personnel ==
- Lucien Windrich – guitar, vocals
- Erik Windrich – keyboards, vocals
- Wayne Harker – drums on 'Sgt. Major
