= Robbie Jansen =

South African musician (1949–2010)

Robert Edward Jansen (5 August 1949 – 7 July 2010) was a South African musician. He was born in Cape Town, South Africa.

== Biography ==
Jansen began his career in the pop band The Rockets. The first instruments he played were concertina and mouth organ. The repertoire of the first bands he played with consisted of British pop of the hippie era. But after a trip to London, which was part of a prize in a band competition, he discovered black music from the U.S. and in particular groups with brass sections and he decided he wanted to be a brass instrument player. Brass instrument bands were not new to him as his father was associated with Salvation Army bands, but Jansen chose rock and jazz. He played in the brass section of Cape Town's jazz-rock group The Pacific Express. From there he began a solo career as a singer and saxophonist.

His first nationwide recognition in South Africa was as a member of the Dollar Brand group. He and saxophonist Basil Coetzee toured and recorded with Brand on Mannenberg sessions. He later recorded with Brand, also known as Abdullah Ibrahim, on other projects. His work with Brand and Coetzee in the 1970s introduced him to jazz audiences, and he became a leading figure in Cape Jazz. He signed with Mountain Records and was instrumental in encouraging the record label to collect works from their archive to issue the first definitive Cape Jazz collection album.

South African duo Johnny Clegg and Sipho Mchunu hired Jansen to play flute and saxophone on Juluka's debut album, Universal Men. Jansen joined the band for their next two albums, but he departed between African Litany and Ubuhle Bemvelo to resume his solo career.

In 2006 his album Nomad Jez was a finalist for a South African Music Award as best jazz album of the year. He recorded two other solo albums: Vastrap Island and The Cape Doctor (with his group, The Sons of Table Mountain). The albums were produced by Patrick Lee-Thorp.

The label management of his record label credit Jansen with the origination of the description of the style of Jazz played in the Cape Town region as Cape Jazz. He and fellow saxophone player, Basil Coetzee used this description of the music in their earliest recordings.

Jansen was in the hospital after becoming ill in July 2005. The provincial government of the Western Cape met his medical bills as he had no medical insurance. He was immensely popular with Capetonians and when he returned to performing, usually with his band The Sons of the Table Mountain, he was always met with affection, love, and respect.

A blow to his career came in March 2007 when his doctors said that he could no longer travel long distances by air due to his respiratory condition. This forced the cancellation of his 2007 European tour and put an end to his international performances. He collapsed while on tour in Grahamstown in 2010 when his respirator malfunctioned. He died in hospital in Cape Town in July 2010 at the age of 61.

== Controversy ==
In 2006, a Media24 community newspaper, the People's Post, refused to publish an interview conducted with Jansen, citing his criticism of that year's SAMA. The interview was, according to papers filed at the Labour Court of South Africa, unfit to publish in a family newspaper. "Mr Jansen's views are too controversial to publish in a community newspaper targeted at a family audience." The editor of the People's Post at the time also cited Jansen's reputation as a drinker and frequenter of nightclubs. The journalist who conducted the interview brought a civil case against the corporation.

== Discography ==
- Vastrap Island (Mountain, 1996)
- The Cape Doctor (Mountain, 2000)
- Nomad Jez (Mountain, 2005)
