= Radio Rats =

South African rock group formed in 1977

- Origin: Springs, South Africa
- Genres: Rock
- Labels: Jo'burg Records; Radium Wreckords
- Past members: Dave Davies; Leonard Dixon; Jonathan Handley; Herbie Parkin
- Website: www.radiorats.co.za

The Radio Rats is a South African rock group formed in 1977 in Springs, South Africa, by Jonathan Handley (lead guitar and background vocals), Dave Davies on lead vocals and Herbie Parkin on bass, with various drummers. Leonard Dixon is remembered as the group's drummer during its most famous period.

"The Rats", as they are known colloquially, are notable for their 1979 hit "ZX Dan". In 1978, the group recorded a ten-song LP called Into the Night We Slide. The album immediately created a stir, in particular with its kick-off single, "ZX Dan", which peaked at no. 2 on Johannesburg-based Radio 5 (now called "5FM"). It was kept off the number one position by Michael Jackson.

== Critical reception ==
The South African Rock Lists website lists Into the Night We Slide as one of the top ten local rock albums of the seventies, along with Hawk's African Day (1971), Freedom's Children's Astra (1970) and Rabbitt's Boys Will Be Boys (1975). Into the Night We Slide has also been included in the "Essential South African albums" list, based on a survey of various people in the South African music industry compiled in 2002 by music critic, John Samson.

In his Radio Rats retrospective on SAFM radio in January 2000, Nigel Vermaas called Jonathan Handley one of the unsung heroes of South African music: "He's funny, he's witty and he's dedicated. And he's disarmingly self-deprecating."

== History ==
=== The early years ===
The name "Radio Rats" first appeared on an A4 poster drawn and put up in August 1977 in Springs up by fifth-year Wits University medical student, Jonathan Handley. The band had in quick succession earlier that year called themselves "The Warehouse Rats", then "Slither", which briefly featured John Griffith – who as solo artist "John Ireland" would make his name with hits, "(You're) Living Inside my Head" in 1978 and "I Like" in 1982.

Dave Davies gave Parkin – also called David – the nickname "Herbie" because he didn't want a band with two men sporting the same name, and it stuck. Lloyd Ross of Shifty Records joined the Rats as a second guitarist and played on the 7-singles, "Crazy Caroline" and "Rocket Road", in 1979.

Cheryl van Blerk was the PRO for the Gramophone Record Company when she first heard the Radio Rats' demos, including an intriguing song titled "ZX Dan". When GRC ignored them, she recommended the band to her brother Patric, the owner of Jo'Burg Records and the legendary South African producer and composer. Jo'Burg Records was very active at the time following the success of artists like Rabbitt and Margaret Singana. Patric van Blerk, remembering that he loved the band from when he first heard them, described them in these terms: "Jonathan is a wizard and Dave Davies the greatest undiscovered rock leader singer in the world (alongside Brian Davidson [of Freedom's Children]) ! The whole album was oh-so right – and 'ZX Dan' just screamed 'hit'."

Cheryl van Blerk left GRC to become the Rats' manager.

The band cites among its influences John Cale ("not JJ Cale!"), David Bowie, Iggy Pop & the Stooges, the Rolling Stones, the Sex Pistols and the early Dr Feelgood. Despite this, during live performances they mostly played their own songs, which had all been written by Handley.

=== "ZX Dan" ===
In January/February 1979, "ZX Dan" peaked at number two on Johannesburg-based Radio 5. It is still cherished as one of South Africa's greatest pop rock songs of all time. At the end of 1999, it received the second-most votes in the "All time favourite SA song" category in "The SA Rock Digest/Amuzine End of the Century Big Vote". Bright Blue's 1988 self-composition, "Weeping", took first spot. "Scatterlings of Africa" (1983) by Johnny Clegg and Juluka was third.

In his liner notes for the 2002 CD release of Into the Night We Slide, Brian Currin wrote: "'ZX Dan' is a wonderful piece of new wave space-rock whose similar lyrical theme is a nod to David Bowie’s 1972 hit, 'Star Man'. The song was also inspired by the 1977 Steven Spielberg film Close Encounters of the Third Kind."

=== Into the Night We Slide ===
In Patric van Blerk's words, Into the Night We Slide is "a lovely adventure, which never caught fire mainstream, but has enjoyed the sort of passionate niche-loyalty that made a treasure out of [South African band] Freedom’s Children’s Astra. I always thought of it as the Jo’Burg Records equivalent to the other gems which took decades to go gold and platinum, such as Van Morrison's Astral Weeks."

Reviewer Kurt Shoemaker of Texas, US, wrote in the SA Rock Digest e-mag on 27 November 1999: "I cannot think of any performers or groups to compare the Radio Rats to, so I'm left with the conclusion that in rock this is original stuff. Additionally, while possessing a distinctive style, each song is different from the others . . . This is fun and original and rollicking rock that doesn't lend itself to analogy."

Nonetheless, with the solitary exception of "ZX Dan", all tracks on the LP were banned from airplay by the South African Broadcasting Corporation because of their lyrical content.

The Rats recorded "Crazy Caroline" and "Rocket Road" at Satbel Studios in Johannesburg during June 1979 using Pierre de Sade (born Vos) on drums and Lloyd Ross on guitar. "Crazy Caroline" backed with the latter song was released as a single in July, but it failed to stir the charts.

=== The Radio Rats live in concert ===
Duncan Gibbon reviewed for Music Maker magazine a double-header concert of The Radio Rats and Wild Youth held at Travolta's at the Killarney Hotel in Durban in April 1979.

"The pre-gig atmosphere was electric. There were people who were convinced that Rats were going to blow it, that the Wits [University] gig [the previous month] had been the beginning of the end. The news that new guitarist Lloyd Ross was too sick to make the trip seemed to confirm their views . . ..

"They were all wrong . . .

"Radio Rats opened with a strong set that firmly established them as one of the most vital outfits to have emerged in South Africa in years. They were tight and funky with a confident air that belied any impressions of impending disaster. The first song was 'Rocking', taken at a cracking pace that revealed the strength of new recruit Pierre de Sade on drums. He was powerful and decisive, knitting well with Herbie Parkins' bass lines, and providing a solid backing for the two front men. Dave Davies was in fine form – his distinctive vocals were rivetting as he gave all he had to give. Jonathan Handley looked happy as he led the band through the songs, playing some fine guitar and contributing the backing vocals. They were confident and firm, playing solid rock music with a bite. 'Poxy Music', 'Waiting for the Boot' and 'Man After You' were all well delivered. Rats left the stage triumphant, promising to return for a second set . . ..

"When the Rats took the stage again, they made no mistake in confirming their aim in conquering the Durban audience. They seemed to take the energy level of Wild Youth, and translate it into their own idiom. They worked the audience up with solid renditions of 'ZX Dan' and 'Law and Order' before pulling out all the stops with 'Crazy Caroline' during which the audience went bananas! Extremely fast and very tight – it was great. From here on – Rats ruled!”

=== 1980s and 1990s ===
Following their earlier success, 1980 was meant to be the year that the Radio Rats "made it big", but once again the group was plagued by renewed drummer problems following Leonard Dixon's departure. Although they never recaptured their former glory, the band's core of Jonathan Handley and Dave Davies continues until today. Over the years, Davies and Handley and various friends (sometimes including Jonathan's brother Graham) have released music under various guises – as the Radio Rats, the Pop Guns, the Chauffeurs, Titus Groan and the Glee Club.

=== Present ===
On 2013's Cyanide Lake, Jonathan Handley has reunited the classic Rats line-up by utilising previous band members, Leonard Dixon and Herbie Parkin, during visits that year to South Africa and, as ever, its original vocalist Dave Davies.

Jonathan Handley and Dave Davies still record and perform together. Handley is an anaesthetist practising in Pietermaritzburg and continues to record and archive in his home studio in Winterskloof. As an anaesthetist, he also oversees the training of future diplomate in anaesthetics. By September 2013, Jonathan Handley and his team of tutors at the hospital have trained more than 100 diplomate in anaesthetics. Davies still resides in the same house in Springs where he has always lived. Herbie Parkin is living, working, and playing in Sweden, most recently with Men on the Border, while Leonard Dixon has settled in Germany where he is still drumming.

2013's Cyanide Lake has reunited musically all four members that played on Into the Night We Slide, for the first time since the band's classic 1978 album.

== Discography ==
=== Singles ===
- "ZX-Dan"/"Rocking" (1979)
- "Crazy Caroline"/"I'm In Love" (June 1979)
- "Erase"/"Lisa Come Down" (April 1981)
- "The Big Wham Bam"/"Welcome to My Car" (1981)

=== Albums ===
- Into the Night We Slide (1978)
- To the Tower (1981; 12 early Radio Rats compositions that were never released)
- The Big Beat (1991)
- Third Street (1995)
- Theatre of Electric Chairs, aka Radio Rats IV (1995)
- Tandy Park (1996)
- Music for Funerals (2000)
- Modern Cake Decorating (2001)
- Home Decorating for Beginners (2003)
- Entertaining from your Freezer (2005)
- Locomotive Hotel (with Roger Lucey) (2005)
- Spooky Obsession (2006)
- Pop Coffins (2009)
- Love Train (2010)
- Madhouse (2011)
- Radio Rats Live 1978 (2012)
- Merry Tales (2013)
- Cyanide Lake (2013)

=== Compilations ===
- Pure Pop 1985-1988 (Radio Rats demos) (1988)
- Girl Trouble (the Glee Club) (1999)
- Girl Trouble 2 (the Radio Rats) (2009)
- Girl Trouble 3 – Serious Trouble (the Glee Club, the Radio Rats and the Pop Guns) (2010)
