= Best of Live (Johnny Clegg album) =

Live album by Johnny Clegg
- Released: 2003
- Recorded: Nelson Mandela Theatre, September 2003
- Genre: World Music
- Length: ??:??
- Label: Capitol
- Producer: Johnny Clegg

Best of Live is a live album from South African artist Johnny Clegg.

The performance took place in September 2003 at the Nelson Mandela Theatre, in an event called Johnny Clegg: A South African Story, an audiovisual and autobiographical show. Clegg's band played to over 22,000 spectators in 18 shows, and the album contains what were considered the best 15 performances, with songs from both the Juluka and Savuka periods of Clegg's career.

== Track listing ==
1. "Bullets for Bafazana" – 3:21
2. "I Call Your Name" – 4:37
3. "Giyani" – 5:37
4. "Into The Picture" – 2:47
5. "The Crossing" – 5:29
6. "Colours of Change" – 3:35
7. "Great Heart" – 4:39
8. "Cruel, Crazy Beautiful World" – 4:23
9. "Impi" – 4:06
10. "Scatterlings of Africa" – 3:59
11. "Tatazela" – 3:47
12. "Dela" – 5:34
13. "December African Rain" – 5:31
14. "Umfazi Omdala" – 3:39
15. "Asimbonanga" – 5:32
