= The Good Hope Concerts =

Live album by Juluka
- Released: 1986
- Genre: World Music
- Length: 42:20
- Label: EMI Music South Africa (Pty) Ltd
- Producer: Hilton Rosenthal

Juluka chronology
Musa Ukungilandela (1985)	The Good Hope Concerts (1986)	Le Rock Zoulou de Johnny Clegg & Sipho Mchunu (1988)

The Good Hope Concerts is a live album from Juluka, a South African band led by Johnny Clegg and Sipho Mchunu. It was first released in 1986. It was recorded at the Good Hope Centre in Cape Town. The concerts were Clegg's first major successes in Cape Town and were promoted by local record label Mountain Records.

== Track listing ==
All tracks are written by Johnny Clegg, unless otherwise noted.

No.	Title	Length
1.	"African Sky Blue" (Johnny Clegg / Sipho Mchunu)	4'49
2.	"Africa"	3'48
3.	"Kilimanjaro"	4'26
4.	"Woza Friday"	3'27
5.	"Siyayilanda"	4'30
6.	"December African Rain"	4'46
7.	"Umfazi Omdala" (Johnny Clegg / Sipho Mchunu)	3'12
8.	"Impi"	4'23
9.	"Scatterlings of Africa"	3'46
10.	"Gijim'beke" (Sipho Mchunu)	4'53
Total length:		42'20

== Personnel ==
- Johnny Clegg - vocals, guitar
- Sipho Mchunu - guitar, percussion, vocals
- Gary Van Zyl - bass guitar, percussion, vocals
- Derek de Beer - drums, percussion, vocals
- Cyril Mnculwane - keyboards, vocals
- Scorpion Madondo - flute, saxophone, vocals

=== Technical ===
- Produced by: Hilton Rosenthal
- Recording Engineer: Kevin Shirley
- Remix Engineer: Bobby Summerfield
