= Stand Your Ground (Juluka album) =

Studio album by Juluka
- Released: 1984

Juluka chronology
The International Tracks (1984)	Stand Your Ground (1984)	Musa Ukungilandela (1984)

Stand Your Ground is a 1984 album by Juluka, a South African band led by Johnny Clegg and Sipho Mchunu. The album was distributed by Warner Bros. Records in select countries of Europe and the Americas. The album debuted four new Juluka songs: "Kilimanjaro", "Look into the Mirror", "Fever", and "Crazy Woman". The six remaining tracks are songs that were previously released on Juluka's 1983 album, Work for All.

In South Africa and Zimbabwe, an alternate album was released: The International Tracks (MINC, 1984). This 7-track EP has the same cover art and new songs as Stand Your Ground. The difference is that, instead of the songs from Work for All, The International Tracks has two new remixes and one reissued track: "Umbaqanga Music" from the international release of the 1982 album Scatterlings.

The title Stand Your Ground is a translation of the Zulu title of the track "Mana Lapho".

== Track listing ==
1. Kilimanjaro 3:42
2. Look into the Mirror 3:38
3. December African Rain 4:22
4. Mana Lapho (Stand Your Ground) 3:52
5. Work for All 3:56
6. Fever 3:45
7. Mantombana 3:40
8. Crazy Woman 4:15
9. Bullets for Bafazane 3:53
10. Walima' Mabele 4:19

== Personnel ==
- Johnny Clegg - vocals, guitar
- Sipho Mchunu - guitar, percussion, vocals
- Gary Van Zyl - bass guitar, percussion, vocals
- Derek de Beer - drums, percussion, vocals
- Glenda Millar - keyboards, vocals
- Cyril Mnculwane - keyboards, vocals
- Scorpion Madondo - flute, saxophone, vocals
