= Concert in the Park =

Concert in the Park may refer to:

- The Concert in Central Park, 1982 live album by Simon & Garfunkel
- Concert in the Park (South Africa), 1985 benefit concert at Ellis Park Stadium for Operation Hunger
- Concert in the Park (1985 album), double live album of the 1985 benefit concert at Ellis Park Stadium
- Paul Simon's Concert in the Park, 1991 live album by Paul Simon
