= Best of Live =

Best of Live may refer to:

- Best of Live (Bajaga i Instruktori album), 2002
- Best of Live (Johnny Clegg album), 2003
- Best of Live (Last Exit album), 1990
- Best of Live (1996–2005), an album by Kraljevski Apartman, 2005
- Best of Night Ranger Live, an album by Night Ranger, 2005

== See also ==
- Awake: The Best of Live, an album by Live, 2004
