= Musa Ukungilandela =

Music album by Juluka

Studio album by Juluka
- Released: 1984
- Studios: Ovation Studios, Johannesburg, South Africa
- Genres: Afropop, World music
- Length: 36:40
- Language: Zulu
- Producer: Hilton Rosenthal

Juluka chronology
Stand Your Ground (1984)	Musa Ukungilandela (1984)	Crocodile Love (1997)

Musa Ukungilandela (Zulu for "do not follow me") is the sixth studio album by South African band Juluka, led by Johnny Clegg and Sipho Mchunu. Like Ubuhle Bemvelo, it is entirely sung in isiZulu and share similar influences from mbaqanga and township jive.

It was released by the French label Celluloid and was the bands last album until 1997's Crocodile Love, as Mchunu would leave the band the following year and returned to his home in Natal to take care of his family.

== Background ==
Unlike Work For All, the band's previous album, many of the songs on Musa Ukungilandela focus on experiences of everyday life and are not explicitly political.. For example, "Ibhola Lethu" (Zulu for "Our football team") focuses on the following of football. The exception to this is "Akanaki Nokunaka" which directly addresses the forced removals by the Apartheid government. The phrase "Akanaki Nokunaka" translates to "He doesn’t care" and the "GG" refer to the ruling National government.

== Legacy ==
Mchunu has stated that "Zodwa" is among his favourite Juluka tracks. Steven van Zandt, the original guitarist for Bruce Springsteen’s E Street Band and who wrote the anti-apartheid song Sun City also stated that Musa Ukungilandela is "one of the great albums of all time".

== Track Listing ==
No.	Title	Length
1.	"Nans'Impi"	3:23
2.	"Zodwa"	3:40
3.	"Izinhlobo Nezinhlobo Zabantu"	3:26
4.	"Thoko"	3:55
5.	"Akanaki Nokunaka"	4:18
6.	"Trouble - Musa Ukungilandela"	3:25
7.	"Wangizonda"	3:49
8.	"Kancane Kancane"	3:12
9.	"Ngeke"	3:30
10.	"Ibhola Lethu (The Mainstay Cup Song)"	4:16

== Personnel ==
- Johnny Clegg - Vocals, guitar
- Sipho Mchunu - Vocals, guitar, percussion
- Cyril Mnculwana - Keyboard
- Derek De Beer - Drums, Vocals
- Gary Van Zyl - Bass, Vocals
- Scorpion Madondo - Flute, Saxophone, Vocals
