= I'll Take Care of You (song) =

Single by Bobby Bland

from the album Two Steps from the Blues
- B-side: "That's Why"
- Released: 1959
- Recorded: 1959
- Genre: R&B
- Length: 2:21
- Label: Duke
- Songwriter: Brook Benton

Bobby Bland singles chronology
"Is It Real" (1959)	"I'll Take Care of You" (1959)	"Lead Me On" (1960)

"I'll Take Care of You" is a song written by Brook Benton and originally recorded by Bobby Bland in 1959. It reached number 89 on the Billboard Hot 100 in January 1960.

== Covers and samples ==
Elements of the original Bland recording were used for the track "Guardian Angel" by hip-hop artist Wordsworth and "Lyrics Files" by Akhenaton from the soundtrack of French action-comedy Taxi.

The song has been covered many times since by artists such as Van Morrison, Elvis Costello, Roy Hamilton, Jackie Payne, Etta James, Mick Hucknall, Irma Thomas, O. V. Wright, Mark Lanegan, Beth Hart and Joe Bonamassa, and Gil Scott-Heron.

In 1989, Gary B.B. Coleman included the song on his album One Night Stand.

In 2011, Jamie xx remixed Scott-Heron's cover, which was subsequently reworked by Drake and Rihanna and released as the single "Take Care" for the album Take Care.

Also in 2011, Joe Bonamassa and Beth Hart covered the song in their collaborative album, Don't Explain.

Also this year Florence + The Machine covered Drake's version live for BBC Radio 1, and then released it in their studio album Ceremonials.

In 2012, Rebecca Ferguson covered the song on her Heaven Tour, and then the live version of the song was included in the re-release of her debut album, Heaven.
