= December African Rain =

"December African Rain" is a song by the South African band Juluka, first released on their 1983 album Work for All.

== Music and composition ==
"December African Rain" is a love song sung from the perspective of a person who is dying. The song begins with drums and guitar, followed by a two-part chorus beginning a descending repetitive melody on vocables. The soloist enters on a melody that echoes the chorus, establishing a call-and-response pattern that has been described as traditional to various South African musical traditions. The song's verses and bridge feature English lyrics sung by Johnny Clegg, featuring strong imagery. The vocables sung by the backing chorus are reminiscent of Zulu ngoma music, highlighting the song's rhythm. In the chorus, in contrast, the soloist and backing vocalists sing largely in unison. The song's musical structure has been described as blending Western and Zulu influences, including maskandi guitar.

== Release and reception ==
"December African Rain" was the first song on Juluka's 1983 album Work for All. The song became popular, and scholar Richard Pithouse wrote that it "richly deserves its standing as a classic". The track was featured on several compilations, including Stand Your Ground (1985), The Good Hope Concerts (1986), and greatest hit collections alongside work by Juluka's successor band Savuka.
