= ÉVoid (album) =

Album by éVoid

éVoid

Studio album by éVoid
- Released: 1983
- Studios: RPM Studios, Johannesburg
- Genres: New wave, post-punk, dance
- Length: 30:50
- Label: WEA

ÉVoid chronology
éVoid (1983)	Here Comes the Rot (1986)

éVoid (in some editions titled as I Am a Fadget) is the debut album by South African rock group, éVoid.The band had, after a number of line up changes, solidified around the Windrich brothers, Erik and Lucien, and drummer Wayne Harker. By the time of their debuts release in 1983, the band had grown a strong following, mainly during their residency at the Chelsea Hotel in the Hillbrow suburb of Johannesburg.

== Background ==
The band, which had formed in Brakpan, on the East Rand had released a cover of The Knack's song, My Sharona (under the name of "Void") in 1979. The previous year they had won a section of the East Rand Battle of the Bands.

By 1982 the band had developed a unique sound, blending influence from Jive, Afro-rock and punk rock. The band would also begin wearing face paint and traditional African attire as part of their live shows. The band had also found a stable lineup by this time, consisting of; Erik and Lucien Windrich, (Who have been the only consistent members throughout éVoid's history) and drummer Wayne Harker.

Prior to the album's release, record company WEA released the single, "Shadows", backed with "Dun Kalusin Ta Va", in August 1983. "Shadows" peaked at number three on the national charts in November. It was followed up by "Taximan" in February 1984, which reached no. 6 on the South African hit parade. Later that year, "I Am a Fadget" was released as the band’s third single.

By September 1984, the album was riding high at the top of the charts, which was rare for home-grown acts more used to living in the shadow of overseas artists. At the country's annual Sarie Awards for 1984, éVoid took the award for “best arrangement and production of an album”, while the single “I Am a Fadget” landed them the “best contemporary artist” award.

== Legacy ==
The album is considered éVoid's most successful and popular with the singles "I am a Fadget" and "Shadows". Fans of the band have subsequently become known as "Fadgets" at the bands concerts. The band would perform "Junk Jive" at the Concert in the Park which would be recorded for the album of the same, released in 1985. Other popular songs were "Taximan" and "Urban Warrior", with the latter being compared to the Juluka song "African Sky Blue" lyrically as it talks about: "the plight of the Zulu Warrior who is now having to cope with a modern world that is not kind to him."

"Shadows" would later be rerecorded by the band for their 1993 cassette E-VOID and would be covered by another South African rock band, Wonderboom for their 2001 album "Rewind".

== Track listing ==
All tracks are written by Lucien and Erik Windrich, except for lyrics on "Taximan" by Karl A. Windrich, and "Inda Inda Indaba" written by Lucien, Erik and Karl Windrich.

Side one
No.	Title	Length
1.	"I Am a Fadget"	5:35
2.	"Taximan"	2:55
3.	"Inda Inda Indaba"	3:49
4.	"Junk Jive, Part One"	4:54
Total length:		17:13

Side two
No.	Title	Length
1.	"Shadows"	4:52
2.	"Dun Kalusin Ta Va"	3:05
3.	"Urban Warrior"	5:40
5.	"Kwela Walk" (Bonus Track*)	2:54
Total length:		16:31 33:44

Bonus tracks on Sheer Sound's 2008 CD re-issue.
No.	Title	Notes	Length
1.	"I am a Fadget (Alternate Mix)"		5:30
2.	"Shadows (Alternate Version)"		5:00
3.	"Jiving to the Weekend Beat"	Originally released on E-VOID	3:34
4.	"Race of Tan"	Originally released on E-VOID	4:26
5.	"Jeremiah and Josephine"	Originally released on E-VOID	3:52
Total length:			22:22

*Kwela Walk was not originally included on the album, instead it was the B-side to the 12" single version of I am a Fadget. Digital releases now however include it as a "Bonus track"

== Personnel ==
=== éVoid ===
- Lucien Windrich – vocals, guitars
- Erik Windrich – vocals, keyboards, bass synthesizers
- Wayne Harker – Drums

=== Additional Musicians ===
- Bakithi Khumalo – bass on "Taximan"
