= ÉVoid =

South African rock band

éVoid
- Origin: Johannesburg, South Africa
- Genres: Post-punk, new wave, alternative rock
- Years active: 1977–present
- Label: Warner Music
- Members: Lucien Windrich; Erik Windrich; Wayne Harker
- Past members: Terry Andalis; Danny de Wet; José "Aggi" D'Aguiar; George Voros

éVoid is a rock band that emerged in 1980s South Africa. A three-piece outfit, it featured the brothers Lucien and Erik Windrich with Georg Voros, Wayne Harker and Danny de Wet all playing drums at different points. Erik played keyboards and sang lead vocal, while Lucien played guitar and provided backing vocals.

éVoid became the most successful and influential of the South African punk bands to take up African-inspired images and sounds in their sonic rebellion against apartheid in the 1980s.

== History ==
=== Origins and early years: 1977-9 ===
The liner notes, written by Michael Waddacor, on the Fresh Music CD re-issue of éVoid and . . . Here Comes the Rot provides a lengthy and exacting musical history of the trio.

The group was formed in 1977 in Brakpan on the gold-rich reef of the Witwatersrand. Lucien Windrich, who was born in November 1958 in the Netherlands, began playing in a Brakpan band called "Zennith" with high school friends that included bassist Benjy Mudie, the future South African music custodian. The band changed its name to "Void" in 1977, and the following year was joined by Lucien's younger brother, Erik (born February 1960, also in the Netherlands).

In 1978, even though Void had won that year's "Battle of the Bands" contest on the Witwatersrand, they were still struggling to find a decent paying gig in the country. An opening presented itself in Rhodesia – a country where audiences were starved of good live rock music. While spending eight months there, along with drummer Danny de Wet (later of Petit Cheval and Wonderboom) and bassist Terry Andalis, in 1979 the band recorded a cover of the Knack's current hit, "My Sharona". But it was the B-side "Magicia" that took off and reached number 4 on the country's charts.

=== Success, and development of "ethnotronic" style ===
Returning to South Africa, the group re-assessed its identity following the departure of Terry Andalis, José "Aggi" D'Aguiar & finally Danny De Wet in 1982 (at the end of a contract in Port Elizabeth). Lucien, Erik and third brother Karl, the band's manager, changed the name to "éVoid" and it became a three piece with Georg Voros on drums. Early in 1983, another change occurred when Wayne Harker took over from drummer, Georg Voros. éVoid quickly built up a following of enthusiastic fans, that started in East London and spread nationally over a period of four years. The members were creating a more finely balanced and subtle fusion of Afro-rock (which they called "ethnotronics"), which was different from the more traditional sounds of their contemporaries, Juluka and Hotline, or the rock-based Tribe After Tribe, Ella Mental, Via Afrika, Flash Harry and Neill Solomon's Passengers. However, like other Afro-rock bands, éVoid conveyed immediacy, simplicity and warmth of spirit. Managed and promoted by a third Windrich brother, Karl, éVoid now upped their image with painted faces, tribal dances and South African jive rhythms.

Success arrived when WEA (now Tusk Music) in Johannesburg signed them to a recording contract. Simply called éVoid, the debut album yielded the first single, "Shadows", which was released in August 1983. It was backed with the infectious "Dun Kalusin Ta Va", which had become a hallmark of their sound. "Shadows" peaked at number three on the national charts in November and, to this day, remains a staple of South African rock and pop-oriented radio stations.

=== 1984: creativity, fadgets and military police ===
Now on a roll of creativity, éVoid recorded and released the catchy follow-up single "Taximan", in February 1984. It reached the no. 6 spot on the charts. Later that year, "I Am a Fadget" became the band's third single.

éVoid was performing before dedicated fans – "fadgets", as they were known – dressed in colourful ethno-gypsy garb, who queued for hundreds of metres to see them. In this spirit, the three-piece embarked on a three-week tour from Durban's University of Natal campus, down the coast to Cape Town and northwards to Bloemfontein, Johannesburg and Pretoria.

However, the politics of the country at that time were to signal the end of the band's glorious run of success. Shortly before the start of their performance in the Eastern Cape university town, Grahamstown, military police arrested Wayne Harker for being absent from leave since December 1982 from his compulsory two-year national service. Original éVoid drummer Danny de Wet was hurriedly recruited to complete the tour. With Harker discharged in March 1984, the band was able to return to business. By September 1984 the first album, "éVoid", was riding high at the top of the charts – a rare feat for home-grown acts used to living in the shadow of overseas artists. At the same time, the three-track 12" maxi-single, "Kwela Walk"/"I am a Fadget"/"Tellem and Gordon", was receiving rave reviews.

=== Media criticism and attention ===
In general, the media were favourably disposed towards éVoid, although criticism was also levelled that the band was androgynous misfits, pretentious white boys in beads, and shallow-minded slaves to fashion and rhythm.

At the country's annual Sarie Awards for 1984, the group took the award for "best arrangement and production of an album", while the single "I Am a Fadget" landed them the "best contemporary artist" award.

On Saturday 12 January 1985, the band performed before an estimated 100 000 people at the "Concert in the Park" in support of Operation Hunger, along with Hotline, Via Afrika, Juluka, All Night Radio, Ella Mental, Steve Kekana, Harari, Mara Louw and The Rockets.

The intervening years, however, were leading the Windrich brothers into a period of personal introspection: they had reached the pinnacle of their hopes in South Africa, in hindsight were critical of the production quality of their debut album, and the South African Defence Force was conscripting Erik for his two-year period of National Service. By this stage, Wayne Harker had already quit éVoid to join the Cape Town band, Askari.

In 1985 the brothers left South Africa for London, where they set up an eight-track studio in their garage and performed as a four-piece with fellow South Africans, Ilne Hofmeyr on bass and Richard Devey on drums. Throughout most of 1986 they worked on their second album, . . . Here Comes the Rot, from which WEA released the single "Dance the Instinct"/"Sergeant Major". However, they were to find that their infectious brand of music did not appeal to Great Britain's A&R executives.

Back in South Africa, WEA released . . . Here Comes the Rot in December 1986, to coincide with éVoid's six-week nationwide tour of the country.

In 1993, the group released a compilation called, éVoid – Over the Years, and made it available on cassette for limited distribution at the Springbok Bar in London.

== Present day ==
=== The members of éVoid today ===
The liner notes for the 2000 CD release of "éVoid" described Lucien as living in North London with his partner Cathy and their son and daughter, while studying astrology and reading for a degree in anthropology.

Erik and his partner, Alix, a lawyer, are living in North-West London with their daughter and her three children. He won a place on the two-year postgraduate course at England's National Film and Television School. He has commented that arriving in London in 1985 and trying to earn a living as respected musicians has rarely been easy, and éVoid's arrival in London at the time of South Africa's State of Emergency made people suspicious of them. They did, however, benefit from some lucky breaks and, over the following decade, played many club and festival gigs in Britain and on the Continent, most notably Germany.

Wayne Harker maintained his career in music. After the dissolution of Askari in Cape Town, he was summoned to rejoin the band (with Ilne Hofmeyr) and record fresh material. He spent about four years in the band in the late 1980s and the early 1990s, which included a six-week tour of Germany. Obtaining a work permit in Germany, he met and married a local girl and settled in Cologne. In time, he developed his musical talents to include bass guitar and the keyboards, and writes and records his own original music.

=== Later years and present day ===
In 2008, after a lengthy hiatus, the Windrich brothers and original eVoid drummer Georg Voros released another éVoid album, Graffiti Lounge. Reviewing the CD, Johannesburg newspaper The Citizen wrote: "The songwriting power is still very much in evidence, and what could have been a tricky career stumble is, without doubt, a triumph."

Erik is currently employed as the Creative and Performance Manager at Kingsbury High School, London.

== Discography ==
=== Studio Albums ===
- *éVoid (1983)
- Here Comes the Rot (1986)
- E-VOID/London Kazet (1993)
- Graffiti Lounge (2008)

=== Singles ===
As "Void":

1. 1979 – "My Sharona"/"Magicia"

As "éVoid":

1. 1983 – "Shadows"/"Dun Kalusin Ta Va" (SA 3)
2. 1984 – "Taximan" (SA 6)
3. 1984 – "I Am a Fadget"
4. 1984 – "Kwela Walk"/"I am a Fadget"/"Telem and Godon"
5. 1986 – "Dance the Instinct"/"Under My Feet"
- A live version of "Junk Jive" was released on the Concert in the Park collection in aid of Operation Hunger (1985).
