= Nothin' but the Blues =

Nothin' but the Blues may refer to:

- Nothin' but the Blues (Elkie Brooks album)
- Nothin' but the Blues (Joe Williams album)
- Nothin' but the Blues (Johnny Winter album)
- Nothin' but the Blues (Gary B. B. Coleman album)
