= The Best of Gary B.B. Coleman =

Compilation album by Gary B.B. Coleman
- Released: 1991
- Recorded: 1987–1991
- Genre: Blues
- Length: 56:55
- Label: Ichiban
- Producer: Gary B.B. Coleman

Gary B.B. Coleman chronology
Romance Without Finance Is a Nuisance (1990)	The Best of Gary B.B. Coleman (1991)	Too Much Weekend (1992)

Professional ratings
Review scores
Source	Rating
AllMusic	4.5/5 stars
The Virgin Encyclopedia of the Blues	3/5 stars

The Best of Gary B.B. Coleman is a compilation album by American bluesman Gary B.B. Coleman. The album was released in 1991 by Ichiban Records label and contains 12 compositions from previous Coleman's releases.

== Reception ==
Niles J. Frantz of AllMusic wrote "This is a good career overview, though it does expose a certain lack of originality and diversity."

== Track listing ==
No.	Title	Writer(s)	Length
1.	"One Eyed Woman"	Traditional	4:23
2.	"Baby Scratch My Back"	Slim Harpo	4:27
3.	"Cloud Nine"	George Harrison	5:38
4.	"A Word of Warning"	Coleman	5:07
5.	"I Fell in Love on a One Night Stand"	Coleman	5:43
6.	"Merry Christmas Baby"	Lou Baxter, Johnny Moore	3:51
7.	"Watch Before You Stroke"	Coleman	6:00
8.	"Think Before You Act"	Sidney Austin, Coleman	5:04
9.	"If You Can Beat Me Rockin' (You Can Have My Chair)"	Coleman	3:30
10.	"St. James Infirmary"	Joe Primrose, Traditional	4:50
11.	"I Won't Be Your Fool"	Coleman	4:27
12.	"Christmas Blues" (Instrumental)	Coleman	3:55
Total length:			56:55
