= The International Tracks =

Compilation album by Juluka
- Released: 1984
- Length: 31:06

Juluka chronology
| Work For All (1983) | The International Tracks (1984) | Stand Your Ground (1984) |

The International Tracks is a 1984 EP collecting various singles and remixed tracks by Juluka, a South African band led by Johnny Clegg and Sipho Mchunu. The songs on this album had all been previously released internationally but not in South Africa; hence the title. The cover is the same as Stand Your Ground but with a slightly different track listing, including two dance mixes and excluding four songs previously released on the 1983 album Work for All.

== Track listing ==
1. Kilimanjaro 3:39
2. Look into the Mirror 3:38
3. Fever 3:41
4. Crazy Woman 4:15
5. Umbaqanga Music 3:33
6. Fever - dance mix 6:27
7. Kilimanjaro - dance mix 5:38

Total: 31:06
