= Dancin' My Blues Away =

Studio album by Gary B. B. Coleman
- Released: 1990
- Studio: Kala Studios, Atlanta
- Genre: Blues
- Length: 42:00
- Label: Ichiban
- Producer: Gary B. B. Coleman

Gary B. B. Coleman chronology
One Night Stand (1989)	Dancin' My Blues Away (1990)	Romance Without Finance Is a Nuisance (1991)

Professional ratings
Review scores
Source	Rating
Allmusic	3/5 stars
The Virgin Encyclopedia of the Blues	3/5 stars

Dancin' My Blues Away is the fourth studio album by American bluesman Gary B. B. Coleman released in 1990 by Ichiban Records label.

== Track listing ==
No.	Title	Writer(s)	Length
1.	"A Word of Warning"	Coleman	5:07
2.	"Think Before You Act"	Coleman, Sydney Austin	5:04
3.	"What's the Name of That Thing?"		6:49
4.	"I Gotta Play the Blues for You"	Coleman, Sydney Austin	4:05
5.	"Dancin' My Blues Away"	Coleman, Sydney Austin	3:41
6.	"Maybe Love Wasn't Meant for Me"	Coleman	4:14
7.	"Can't Spend My Money"	Coleman	5:07
8.	"Blues at Sunrise"	Albert King	7:02
Total length:			42:00

== Personnel ==
- Gary B. B. Coleman – guitar, producer, vocals
- Ernie Baker – trumpet
- Bryan Cole – drums
- John Cole – bass
- Ted Dortch – saxophone
- Louise Freeman – backing vocals
- Steve McRay – keyboards
