= African Litany =

Studio album by Juluka
- Released: 1981
- Recorded: 1981
- Length: 40:59
- Labels: EMI/MINC (original South African release); Rhythm Safari (current releases)
- Producer: Hilton Rosenthal

Juluka chronology
Universal Men (1979)	African Litany (1981)	Ubuhle Bemvelo (1982)

Professional ratings
Review scores
Source	Rating
Allmusic	3/5 stars

African Litany is the second studio album from South African band Juluka, released in 1981. It features lyrics sung in English and isiZulu. The album shared musical similarities with Juluka's first album Universal Men, which featured a fusion of South African music, Western folk music, and jazz, but featured more diverse topics in its lyrics. "Heart of the Dancer" explored Clegg's introduction to ngoma dance, while "Mama Shabalala" tells a story of an elderly woman seeking a home, sharing strong continuity with songs from Universal Men. The first track, "Impi", which became one of the band's hits, retells the story of the Battle of Isandlwana, won by the Zulu Kingdom against the British. It was banned from the radio in South Africa at the time of its release, but gained underground popularity. It remains a cult classic in South Africa and has now become mainstream to the point of often been associated with international sports events, in particular rugby. Two later songs, "African Sky Blue" and "High Country", also explore the theme of colonialism.

== Track listing ==
1. "Impi" (Clegg)
2. "African Sky Blue" (Clegg, Mchunu)
3. "Jarusalema" (Clegg)
4. "African Litany" (Clegg)
5. "Bull-Man-Free" (Clegg, Mchunu)
6. "Gijim'beke" (Mchunu)
7. "Heart of the Dancer" (Clegg)
8. "High Country" (Clegg)
9. "Mama Shabalala" (Clegg)
10. "Thandiwe" (Mchunu)

== Personnel ==
- Johnny Clegg - vocals, guitar, mouth bow
- Sipho Mchunu - guitar, percussion, vocals
- Johnny Boshoff - bass guitar, percussion, vocals
- Derek de Beer - drums, percussion
- Robbie Jansen - flute, saxophone, vocals

Additional personnel

- Umvovo Shelembe - vocals
- Umncengeni Ngubane - vocals
