= Concert in the Park (South Africa) =

1985 benefit concert in South Africa

- Benefit concert by various artists
- Location: Johannesburg
- Venue: Ellis Park Stadium
- Associated album: Concert in the Park
- Date: 12 January 1985
- No. of shows: 1
- Attendance: ~125,000

The Concert in the Park was a benefit concert held in Ellis Park Stadium, Johannesburg, South Africa, on 12 January 1985. 22 bands played at the benefit, which was attended by an estimated 125,000 people—of whom about 100,000 had purchased tickets. Proceeds of more than R450,000 went to Operation Hunger, a South African charity founded in 1978.

The bands and solo artists who played that day were:

- Hotline
- Steve Kekana
- Brenda and the Big Dudes
- Pierre de Charmoy
- Mara Louw
- Harari featuring Sipho "Hotstix" Mabuse
- Ella Mental
- Supa Frika
- éVoid
- Umoja
- Feather Control
- Juluka
- Face to Face
- Via Afrika
- Street Kids
- Petit Cheval
- Neville Nash
- Blondie Makhene
- Margaret Singana
- The Rockets
- All Night Radio
- The Working Girls

The band Bright Blue knew they would not be available to play live, but lead singer and songwriter Rob Levitan wrote a song for the occasion, which was recorded and mixed at the Workshop and Ovation Studios in Johannesburg. The song, "Hungry Child", was performed by vocalists Heather Mac (of Ella Mental), Johnny Clegg, Ronnie Joyce, and Steve Kekana, backed by session musicians.

A live album made at the concert was released later that year, as was a single featuring "Hungry Child".

== Live album ==
The live double album Concert in the Park was released on LP record and compact cassette in 1985, distributed by WEA Records. The LP release was packaged in a gatefold cover.

=== Track listing ===
No.	Title	Artist	Length
1.	"Hungry Child"	Concert in the Park	4:20
2.	"Dance Mama"	Hotline	3:00
3.	"Raising My Family"	Steve Kekana	4:18
4.	"Weekend Special"	Brenda and the Big Dudes	4:35
5.	"Live On"	Pierre de Charmoy	3:23
6.	"Motla Le Pula"	Mara Louw	3:42
7.	"I'm Waiting"	Harari feat. Sipho "Hotstix" Mabuse	4:15
8.	"See Yourself (Clowns)"	Ella Mental	3:44
9.	"Love Satisfaction"	Supa Frika	4:37
10.	"Junk Jive"	éVoid	2:49
11.	"Oneness"	Umoja	4:25
12.	"Through the Window"	Feather Control	3:30
13.	"Scatterlings of Africa"	Juluka	3:00
14.	"Night of the Long Knives"	Face to Face	3:30
15.	"Hey Boy"	Via Afrika	4:52
16.	"I'm Mobile"	Street Kids	4:42
17.	"Taking a Fall"	Petit Cheval	3:16
18.	"One of Those Nights"	Neville Nash	4:03
19.	"Inside Out"	Blondie Makhene	6:43
20.	"Hamba Bekile"	Margaret Singana	2:33
21.	"Situations"	The Rockets	3:39
22.	"Breaking Hearts"	All Night Radio	3:47
23.	"Checkmate"	The Working Girls	4:29
Total length:			1:31:12
