= If You Can Beat Me Rockin'... =

Studio album by Gary B. B. Coleman
- Released: 1988
- Studio: Sound Lab Recording Studio, Atlanta
- Genre: Blues
- Length: 44:32
- Label: Ichiban
- Producer: Gary B. B. Coleman

Gary B. B. Coleman chronology
Nothin' but the Blues (1987)	If You Can Beat Me Rockin'... (1988)	One Night Stand (1989)

Professional ratings
Review scores
Source	Rating
AllMusic	4.5/5 stars
The Virgin Encyclopedia of the Blues	3/5 stars

If You Can Beat Me Rockin'... is the second studio album by American blues musician Gary B. B. Coleman. The album was released in 1988 by Ichiban Records label.

== Reception ==
Niles J. Frantz of AllMusic stated: "He was influenced by Jimmy Reed, T-Bone Walker, B.B. King, and Lightnin' Hopkins, along with country & western, cajun, and early rock & roll." In his review for The Virgin Encyclopedia of the Blues Gérard Herzhaft commented "The best album yet from this strange southern bluesman. Sometimes luckluster but sometimes also very tasty."

== Track listing ==
No.	Title	Writer(s)	Length
1.	"Watch Where You Stroke"	Coleman	6:00
2.	"Cloud Nine"	George Harrison	5:38
3.	"Please Don't Dog Me"	Cora Taylor	5:57
4.	"If the Washing Don't Get You (The Rinsing Sure Will)"	Allen Jones, Homer Banks, James Cross	4:03
5.	"If You Can Beat Me Rockin' (You Can Have My Chair)"	Coleman	3:30
6.	"It Just Ain't Right"	Coleman	5:28
7.	"Rub My Back"	James Lewis, Arthur Adams	4:52
8.	"St. James Infirmary"	Sid Fry, Frank Assunto	4:50
9.	"Hide Away"	Freddy King, Sonny Thompson	3:50
Total length:			44:32

== Personnel ==
- Gary B.B. Coleman – producer, lead guitar, bass, rhythm guitar, harmonica
- Harold Banks – backing vocals, drums
- Mike McDaniels – backing vocals
- Sheryl Martin – backing vocals
- Henry Whitting – bass (track 2)
- Mike Alexander – bass
- Bryan Rochon – drums
- Bobby Jones – keyboards
- Frank Amato – keyboards (bass)
- Mike McDaniels – rhythm guitar
- Rick Morris – rhythm guitar (track 2)
