= Romance Without Finance Is a Nuisance =

Studio album by Gary B.B. Coleman
- Released: 1991
- Studio: Kala Studios, Atlanta
- Genre: Blues
- Length: 42:39
- Label: Ichiban
- Producer: Gary B.B. Coleman

Gary B.B. Coleman chronology
Dancin' My Blues Away (1990)	Romance Without Finance Is a Nuisance (1991)	The Best of Gary B.B. Coleman (1991)

Professional ratings
Review scores
Source	Rating
AllMusic	3/5 stars
The Virgin Encyclopedia of the Blues	3/5 stars

Romance Without Finance Is a Nuisance is a studio album by American bluesman Gary B.B. Coleman. The album was released in 1991 by Ichiban Records label and contains eight compositions written by Coleman.

== Reception ==
Alex Henderson of AllMusic stated "It was no coincidence that Gary Coleman had "BB" in his name. One of Coleman's main influences was B.B. King, and he was happy to acknowledge King's inspiration (although he's also learned a thing or two from Bobby "Blue" Bland, Jimmy Reed and the late Albert Collins). Romance Without Finance underscores the fact that while Coleman may not be the most original artist in the world, his Ichiban output has been consistent and enjoyable... Whether Coleman is being remorseful or humorous, this CD was a welcome addition to his catalogue.

== Track listing ==
All tracks are written by Gary B.B. Coleman.

No.	Title	Length
1.	"She Ain't Ugly (She Just Don't Look Like Nobody Else)"	3:56
2.	"Don't Give Away That Recipe"	4:24
3.	"If You See My One-Eyed Woman"	4:22
4.	"Dealin' From the Bottom of the Deck"	8:40
5.	"Romance Without Finance Is a Nuisance"	4:56
6.	"Food Stamp Annie"	4:59
7.	"Mr. Chicken Stew"	6:00
8.	"Mr B's Frosting" (Instrumental)	5:22
Total length:		42:39

== Personnel ==
- Gary B.B. Coleman – vocals, guitar, keyboard, producing
- John Cole – bass
- Johnny Strong – drums
