= Pierre de Charmoy =

- Born: 1 February 1961 (age 65); Durban, KwaZulu Natal, South Africa
- Origin: KwaZulu Natal, South Africa
- Genre: Adult Contemporary
- Occupations: Singer; songwriter; musician; farmer
- Instruments: Acoustic guitar, harmonica
- Years active: 1981–present
- Labels: RPM, Gallo Records, Positive Records
- Website: https://www.youtube.com/c/PierredeCharmoy

Pierre de Charmoy is a South African singer/songwriter. Born in Durban 1 February 1961, An interest in music began from an early age while attending St Charles College, Pietermaritzburg. He had a number 1 hit on the South African charts with his song Live On in 1983. Reaching Out 1984, You're my Lady, also featured in the comedy film Tawwe Tienies, The long Road, Don't Girls get Lonely, 1985, We'll find a way, Naked Hearts, Fell in love with you for life, 1986, Attitude, 1990, April Rain, 1994.

He won the South African SARIE Award for best male singer in 1983, 1984 and 1985, as well as The Scotty 3M Best Album Award prize for “Album of the Year” in 1986 and 1987.

Music remains his passion between his family and farming. He moved to Johannesburg in the late 1970s where he signed with RPM Records. His first single 'Lonely Hearts was released in December 1981. He was subsequently awarded the 'Most Promising New Artist' accolade at the annual South African Music Awards. He went on to release a number of albums and singles, appeared in the movie 'Tawwe Tienies', and hosted a number of television shows, including 'Prime Time', 'Graffiti' and 'No Jacket Required'.

He performed at Miss South Africa pageants and presented the radio programme: Southern Sounds Top Twenty. He also performed in the theatre production of Queen's 'The Show Must Go On'. On January 12, 1985, he was part of the historic 'Concert in the Park', the first, fully multi-racial, mega-music event in South Africa; attracting 120,000 people to Ellis Park, raising funds for NGO Operation Hunger. Pierre has sold roughly 1 million records Worldwide.

== Discography ==
Year	Album	Media Format	Record label
1983	Ovation	LP	RPM
1984	Reaching Out	LP	RPM
1985	Emotions	LP	RPM
1986	Let My Music Touch You	LP	RPM
1986	Positive	LP	RPM
1988	Pierre De Charmoy	LP	RPM
1990	Attitude	LP	Positive Records
1995	Deja Vu	LP	Gallo
2002	Hear Me Now - The Greatest Hits	CD	Gallo
2019	Living a Positive Attitude	CD	Gallo
2019	A Perfect Storm on the long road	CD	Gallo
2020	Reflections	CD	Gallo
