= Graffiti Lounge =

Studio album by éVoid
- Released: September 1, 2008
- Genre: Pop
- Length: 31:00
- Label: Seed Music

ÉVoid chronology
E-VOID/London Kazet (1993)	Graffiti Lounge (2008)

Graffiti Lounge is the fourth studio album by South African rock band éVoid. It was their first album in 15 years since 1993's E-VOID (later retitled to "London Kazet" on streaming services in 2019) and is their first formally released album since 1986's "...Here Comes the Rot!" as E-VOID was only released as a limited cassette at the bands London gigs.

The album was dedicated to Ilne Hofmeyr, the band's bassist who had died of cancer in 2002

== Background ==
After the Windrich brothers relocation to London the band released their second studio album "...Here Comes the Rot!" in 1986 which while successful the band could not reach the same success as they had in South Africa. The band would play on and off in London mainly at the Springbok Bar, and were joined by bassist Ilne Hofmeyr and drummer Wayne Harker (who rejoined the band after his other band Askari disbanded) and would record and release their third album E-VOID as a cassette sold only at their gigs at the Springbok Bar. The Cassette would feature the songs "Mix It Up", "Retread" and "Language of Love" which would later be recorded for Graffiti Lounge.

== Writing and recording ==
Along with the previously recorded songs, several other songs such as "Under Blue Skies (released as a single) were recorded for the album with the song "Not In My Name" being a criticism of the Iraq War. All songs were written and recorded by the Windrich brothers who sang and played guitar and George Voros, the bands original drummer who played percussion for the album.

== Release and reception ==
The album was released on 1 September 2008 with the album serving as a comeback for the band. While the album did not chart like their previous albums it was still praised by media with news24 writing:

"You'll hear a glorious blend of South African sounds and reflective lyrics...They've swapped new wave for new age, but in a totally cool kind of way that has nothing to do with dream catchers and everything to do with environmentalism and political critique."

Graffiti Lounge's release also coincided with the CD rerelease of the bands first two albums.

== Track listing ==
All tracks are written by Erik Windrich except "Riding the Sky" written by Lucien and "Junktion" and "Ikologi" written by both Windrich brothers.

No.	Title	Writer(s)	Notes	Length
1.	"Mix It Up" (2006 re-recording)		Originally recorded on E-VOID	3:40
2.	"Under Blue Skies"			3:17
3.	"Riding The Sky"	Lucien Windrich		3:19
4.	"Echo"			3:04
5.	"Ikologi"	Erik & Lucien Windrich		4:16
6.	"Retread" (2006 re-recording)		Originally recorded on E-VOID	3:48
7.	"Language Of Love" (2006 re-recording)		Originally recorded on E-VOID	4:08
8.	"Junktion"	Erik & Lucien Windrich		3:30
9.	"Not In My Name"			3:05
Total length:				31:00

== Personnel ==
- Lucien Windrich – vocals and guitars
- Erik Windrich – vocals, keyboards, bass synthesizers
- George Voros – drums

== See also ==
- éVoid (album)
