= One Night Stand (Gary B.B. Coleman album) =

Studio album by Gary B. B. Coleman
- Released: 1989
- Studio: Sound Lab Recording Studio, Atlanta
- Genre: Blues
- Length: 40:24
- Label: Ichiban
- Producer: Gary B. B. Coleman

Gary B. B. Coleman chronology
If You Can Beat Me Rockin'... (1988)	One Night Stand (1989)	Dancin' My Blues Away (1990)

Professional ratings
Review scores
Source	Rating
Allmusic	3/5 stars
The Virgin Encyclopedia of the Blues	3/5 stars

One Night Stand is the third studio album by American bluesman Gary B. B. Coleman. The album was released in 1989 by Ichiban Records label.

== Track listing ==
No.	Title	Writer(s)	Length
1.	"Baby Scratch My Back"	Slim Harpo	4:27
2.	"I Wrote This Song for You"	Coleman, Roy Anderson	4:18
3.	"Sitting & Waiting"		3:16
4.	"As the Years Go Passing By"	Deadric Malone	7:57
5.	"I Just Can't Lose These Blues"	Coleman	4:05
6.	"I Fell in Love on a One-Night Stand"	Coleman	5:43
7.	"I'll Take Care of You"	Brook Benton	6:23
8.	"Going Down"	Freddie King	4:15
Total length:			40:24

== Personnel ==
- Gary B. B. Coleman – harmonica, keyboards, lead guitar, producer
- Funky John Cole – bass
- Nathaniel Jenkins – drums
- Roy Anderson – rhythm guitar
- Greg Gould – keyboards
