= Into the Night We Slide =

Studio album by The Radio Rats
- Released: October 1978
- Recorded: August – October 1978, Satbel Studios, Johannesburg
- Genre: Rock
- Length: 39:50
- Label: Jo'Burg Records
- Producer: Greg Cutler

The Radio Rats chronology
Into the Night We Slide (1978)	The Big Beat (1991)

Singles from Into the Night We Slide
- 1. "ZX Dan"/"I'm in Love" Released: October 1978

Into the Night We Slide was the debut album by Springs-based, South African rock group The Radio Rats and was distributed in 1978.

The opening track and first single, "ZX Dan" (backed with "I'm Not in Love"), received national airplay and early in peaked at no. 2 on Johannesburg-based Radio 5. Still cherished as one of South Africa's greatest pop rock songs of all time, it received the second-most votes in the "All time favourite SA song" category in "The SA Rock Digest/Amuzine End of the Century Big Vote", in 1999.

== Contents ==
Side one of the album featured five songs and Side two the remaining five. Jonathan Handley composed the music and words for all.

== Track listing ==
=== Side one ===
- 1. ZX Dan (5:17)
- 2. I'm Not Like That (4:39)
- 3. Plague Café (3:10)
- 4. Bomb Shelter Blues (4:20)
- 5. I'm in Love (2:41)

=== Side two ===
- 6. Law and Order (2:55)
- 7. A Visit to the Cinema (5:31)
- 8. Rocking (2:10)
- 9. Stay in your Rocking Chair (3:29)
- 10. Mucking About in the Dungeons All Day (5:00)

== Personnel ==
- Dave Davies – lead vocals
- Jonathan Handley – lead guitar and background vocals
- Herbie Parkin – bass
- Leonard Dickson – drums and percussion

== Re-issue ==
In 2002, Fresh Music released a digitally remastered CD edition of Into the Night We Slide with two bonus tracks in "Crazy Caroline", the follow-up single in June 1979, and its B-side, "Rocket Road". The liner notes include rare photographs and a band bio.
