= Too Much Weekend =

Studio album by Gary B.B. Coleman
- Released: July 27, 1992
- Studio: KALA Studios (Atlanta, GA)
- Genre: Blues
- Length: 39:20
- Label: Ichiban
- Producer: Gary B.B. Coleman

Gary B.B. Coleman chronology
The Best of Gary B.B. Coleman (1991)	Too Much Weekend (1992)	Cocaine Annie (1996)

Professional ratings
Review scores
Source	Rating
AllMusic	3/5 stars
The Virgin Encyclopedia of the Blues	3/5 stars

Too Much Weekend is a studio album by American bluesman Gary B.B. Coleman. The album was released on July 27, 1992, by Ichiban Records label. This is his seventh and final album for Ichiban. Too Much Weekend was re-released on CD on December 13, 2010.

== Track listing ==
No.	Title	Writer(s)	Length
1.	"Too Much Weekend"	Coleman	6:10
2.	"The Elk Slide"	Coleman	4:04
3.	"The Sky Is Crying"	Elmore James	9:06
4.	"Uncle Bud"	Coleman	3:52
5.	"Welfare Cadillac"	Guy Drake	5:56
6.	"Crosscut Saw"	R.G. Ford	6:02
7.	"Neckbone"	Coleman	4:10
Total length:			39:20

== Personnel ==
- Gary B.B. Coleman – guitar, keyboards, lead vocals, producer
- Lebron Scott – bass
- Bryan Cole – drums
- Jerry McCain – harmonica (tracks: 5)
- Steve McRay – keyboards (additional)
- Ted Dortch – saxophone
- Ernie Baker – trumpet
