= E-VOID/London Kazet =

E-VOID/ London Kazet
- 2019 Digital rerelease as "London Kazet" cover

Studio album by éVoid
- Released: August 1, 1993 as a Limited edition Cassette titled E-VOID, 2019 for the digital release, renamed "London Kazet"
- Recorded: September–November 1992
- Studios: Kingsfield Studio, London
- Genres: Afropop, Rock
- Length: 50:39
- Label: Tan Music

ÉVoid chronology
Here Comes the Rot (1986)	E-VOID/ London Kazet (1993)	Graffiti Lounge (2008)

E-VOID (Later renamed London Kazet) is the third album by South African rock band éVoid. The album was not formally released as their previous albums had been but was instead only released as a cassette under the title E-VOID and only available at their shows at the Springbok Bar in London. In 2019, it received a digital release, renamed London Kazet. The album contained mostly new songs except a re-recording of "Shadows", a song from their debut. Due to the limited release of the album, many of the songs were included as bonus tracks on later CD re-releases of their debut and second album.

== Background ==
The bands previous album Here Comes the Rot in December 1986 and followed a 6-week tour of South Africa producing 2 singles from the album, which was received well. Despite the success in South Africa, the band had a harder time with the British music scene not responding to the bands music as Erik and Lucien had hoped for.

The band would subsequently play on and off gigs at the Springbok Bar in London, along with Erik and Lucien, the brothers were joined by bassist Ilne Hofmeyr and drummer Richard Devey

== Writing and recording ==
The band began recording material for E-VOID at Kingsfield Studio in September 1992. While Erik and Lucien produced and performed on the majority of the album, there are notable exceptions such as the bassline for Children Gone which was conceived by Ilne Hofmeyr and the saxophone on Jiving to the Weekend Beat being played by Adam McCullogh. The album was completed in November of the same year and was released the next year, with the 2019 digital release, as London Kazet, listing the release date as 1 August.

== Release and reception ==
Despite the release, the album was only made available at the bands shows at the Springbok Bar and hence original cassette tapes of the album are increasingly rare. However, later CD rereleases of the first two albums included bonus tracks which were mostly made up of songs from E-VOID.

=== 2019 digital release as London Kazet ===
In 2019 the album with all the original recordings, was released on streaming platforms under the new name of "London Kazet" which was the first time the album was made widely available outside the band's London shows. The digital release also gave an official cover for the album which shows a cassette with the band name and album title on it, on a black background. In an interview in June 2020 Lucien stated that:

"The songs on the cassette tape are available on Spotify under a new title – London Kazet. Have a look. They’re not songs from any of our previous albums. In 2006 we re-recorded a few of them (Mix It Up, Language Of Love and Ikologi) and put them on Graffiti Lounge. But the original versions still exist on London Kazet. I still have one or two of the original cassettes somewhere."

== Track listing ==
All music is composed by Lucien & Erik Windrich. Except where noted.

No.	Title	Notes	Length
1.	"Shoes"		3:42
2.	"Jiving To The Weekend Beat"	Adam McCullogh performed saxophone	3:40
3.	"Language Of Love"		4:37
4.	"Race Of Tan"		4:26
5.	"Ordinary Life"		4:10
6.	"Ikologi"		4:37
7.	"(Sing A Song) Of Children Gone"	listed as "Children Gone" on London Kazet. Bassline conceived by Ilne Hofmeyr	4:31
8.	"Shadows"	1992 re-recording	5:05
9.	"Jeremiah and Josephine"		3:57
10.	"Civil Servant"		4:28
11.	"Mix It Up"		4:10
12.	"Round and Round"		3:16
Total length:			50:39

== Personnel ==
éVoid

- Lucien Windrich - lead guitar, vocals
- Erik Windrich - vocals, acoustic guitar, keyboards
- Ilne Hofmeyr - bass

Other contributors

- Adam McCullogh - saxophone (on Jiving to the Weekend Beat)
