= Scatterlings =

Studio album by Juluka
- Released: 1982
- Recorded: 1982
- Genre: World Music
- Label: EMI/Music Incorporated; Warner Bros. (Internationally); Rhythm Safari (reissues 1996-onwards)
- Producer: Hilton Rosenthal

Juluka chronology
Ubuhle Bemvelo (1982)	Scatterlings (1982)	Work for All (1983)

Singles from Scatterlings
- 1. "Scatterlings of Africa" Released: January 1983; 2. "Umbaqanga Music" Released: April 1983

Professional ratings
Review scores
Source	Rating
AllMusic	3/5 stars
Robert Christgau	B
The Encyclopedia of Popular Music	4/5 stars
MusicHound Rock: The Essential Album Guide	3/5 stars
The Philadelphia Inquirer	2/5 stars
The Rolling Stone Album Guide	3.5/5 stars

Scatterlings is a studio album by Juluka, a South African band led by Johnny Clegg and Sipho Mchunu. It was released in 1982. The album contains "Scatterlings of Africa", arguably the band's biggest hit, which would be re-recorded to more international success by Juluka's successor band, Savuka.

== Background and composition ==
Johnny Clegg stated after the album's release that Juluka had written it with the intent of making it appeal to an audience outside South Africa. The album's lyrics, and the title track "Scatterlings of Africa" in particular include themes of African identity and humanity's shared African heritage. Several songs included political themes: "Siyayilanda" (translated figuratively to "we are seizing the future") for example, was written for Neil Aggett, an anti-apartheid activist and Clegg's friend, who had died in February 1982 in South African Police Service custody after being tortured.

== Release and reception ==
Scatterlings was released in September 1982. Robert Christgau wrote that "being a folkie in South Africa takes a lot more guts than it does in liberal societies, and that's audible all over this album—as are the melodic resources of the Zulu tradition, which happen to be vocal rather than percussive." The Globe and Mail wrote that "the music is an unusual and immensely attractive hybrid of tuneful late sixties English folk (in the Fairport Convention, Renaissance mode) with African rhythms." The Philadelphia Inquirer thought that the band members "are to African music what Crosby, Stills & Nash are to American—namely, wimpy, sappy and awful." Scholar Richard Pithouse wrote that it was a "superb album with powerfully honed lyrics [and] a compelling rock influence", though he noted that the popularity of "Scatterlings of Africa" overshadowed the rest of the album to some degree.

== Track listing ==
=== Original South African Vinyl Release ===
1. "Siyayilanda" (Clegg) – 3:43
2. "Kwela Man" (Clegg) – 3:54
3. "Simple Things" (Clegg, Mchunu) – 3:57
4. "iJwanasibeki" (Clegg) – 4:50
5. "Two Humans on the Run" (Clegg) – 4:41
6. "Scatterlings of Africa" (Clegg) – 5:50
7. "Spirit is the Journey" (Clegg, Mchunu) – 4:40
8. "Digging for Some Words" (Clegg) – 4:12
9. "Shake My Way" (Mchunu) – 3:43
10. "Mad Dog" (Clegg) – 3:29

=== International Release ===
1. "Scatterlings of Africa"
2. "Spirit is the Journey"
3. "Umbaqanga Music"
4. "Digging for Some Words"
5. "Shake My Way"
6. "Siyayilanda"
7. "Kwela Man"
8. "Simple Things"
9. "iJwanasibeki"
10. "Two Humans on the Run"

=== Re-issue ===
1. "Siyayilanda" - 3:57
2. "Kwela Man" - 3:53
3. "Simple Things" - 4:12
4. "iJwanasibeki" - 4:49
5. "Two Humans on the Run" - 4:38
6. "Scatterlings of Africa" - 5:33
7. "Spirit is the Journey" - 4:38
8. "Digging for Some Words" - 4:10
9. "Shake my Way" - 3:41
10. "Mad Dog" - 4:25

== Personnel ==
- Johnny Clegg - vocals, guitar
- Sipho Mchunu - guitar, percussion, vocals
- Gary Van Zyl - bass guitar, percussion, vocals
- Zola Mtiya - drums, percussion, vocals
- Tim Hoare - keyboards, vocals
- Scorpion Madondo - flute, vocals

Additional personnel

- Mike Faure - saxophone (on "Simple Things" and "Spirit is the Journey")
- Mike Makhalemele - saxophone (on "Siyayilanda")
- Glenda Millar - keyboards, synthesisers (on "Umbaqanga Music")
