= Cocaine Annie =

Studio album by Gary B.B. Coleman
- Released: 10 October 1994
- Studio: Night Wing Studio (Shreveport, LA)
- Genre: Blues
- Length: 46:26
- Label: Icehouse Records
- Producer: Gary B.B. Coleman

Gary B.B. Coleman chronology
Too Much Weekend (1992)	Cocaine Annie (1994)

Professional ratings
Review scores
Source	Rating
AllMusic	2/5 stars
The Virgin Encyclopedia of the Blues	3/5 stars

Cocaine Annie is the final studio album by American bluesman Gary B.B. Coleman. To record this release in 1993, he left Ichiban Records with which he had spent his previous five years and issued Cocaine Annie on his own imprint called Boola Boo. Later in 1994, the album was re-released by Icehouse Records. The album includes two covers by Albert King: "Personal Manager" and "Answer to the Laundromat Blues". The album was released on CD on January 13, 2010.

== Track listing ==
No.	Title	Writer(s)	Length
1.	"A Little Bit of Your Gravy — Run All Over My Plate"	Coleman	3:33
2.	"That's Enough"	Coleman	5:03
3.	"Sleeper"	Lowell Fulson, Maxwell Davis	5:06
4.	"Something About You"	Coleman	4:16
5.	"I'm Gonna Find Her"	Coleman, Tommie E. Duke	3:43
6.	"Cocaine Annie"	Coleman	3:14
7.	"Personal Manager"	Albert King, David Porter	6:08
8.	"Baby Please Come Here"	Coleman	4:11
9.	"I Know Somethings on Your Mind"	Coleman, Tommie E. Duke	3:45
10.	"My Old Cows Sick — So Leave Your Bull at Home"	Coleman	3:24
11.	"Answer To (Laundromat Blues)"	Albert King	4:03
Total length:			46:26

== Personnel ==
- Gary B.B. Coleman – vocals, lead guitar, rhythm guitar, piano, organ
- Steve Kilmer – bass
- Trenton Dick – keyboards
