= Work for All =

Studio album by Juluka
- Released: 11 November 1983
- Studio: Satbel Recording Studios, Johannesburg, South Africa; RPM Studios, Johannesburg, South Africa
- Length: 39:28
- Label: MINC
- Producer: Hilton Rosenthal

Juluka chronology
Scatterlings (1982)	Work for All (1983)	The International Tracks (1984)

Work for All is a studio album from Juluka, a South African band led by Johnny Clegg and Sipho Mchunu. It was first released in 1983 and rapidly achieved major success in South Africa where it is now remembered as a classic album in the history of South African music. Work for All is known to be the most directly political Juluka album. At the time that it was composed Clegg was working closely with the trade union movement, and his work had a strong influence on his lyrics. The album's cover featured a photograph of workers, and took its name from a trade union slogan. Scholar Richard Pithouse described it as most closely resembling Juluka's first album Universal Men in its exploration of migrant labourer experience and the use of masculine dance-inspired rhythms. Several songs engaged with the repression and violence experienced by migrant black South Africans, including the title track, "Gunship Ghetto", which criticised conscription, and "Mdantsane", which described the Egerton Massacre in the titular township and referenced poetry by the anti-fascist writer Pablo Neruda.

== Track listing ==
All tracks composed by Johnny Clegg

1. "December African Rain" – 4:20
2. "Bullets for Bafazane" – 3:53
3. "Mana Lapho" – 3:52
4. "Baba Nango" – 3:46
5. "Walima'Mabele" – 4:17
6. "Work For All" – 3:56
7. "Gunship Ghetto" – 3:42
8. "Woza Moya" – 3:34
9. "Mdantsane (Mud Coloured Dusty Blood)" – 3:56
10. "Mantombana" – 3:40

Total: 39:28

== Personnel ==
- Johnny Clegg - vocals, guitar
- Sipho Mchunu - guitar, percussion, vocals
- Gary Van Zyl - bass guitar, percussion, vocals
- Zola Mtiya - drums, percussion, vocals
- Tim Hoare - keyboards, vocals
- Scorpion Madondo - flute, saxophone, vocals
