= Nothin' but the Blues (Gary B.B. Coleman album) =

Studio album by Gary B. B. Coleman
- Released: August 1987
- Studio: Benson Sound Studio, Oklahoma City
- Genre: Blues
- Length: 35:26
- Label: Ichiban
- Producer: Gary B. B. Coleman

Gary B. B. Coleman chronology
Nothin' but the Blues (1987)	If You Can Beat Me Rockin'... (1988)

Alternative cover
- Release by Mister B.s Records

Professional ratings
Review scores
Source	Rating
Allmusic	4.5/5 stars
The Virgin Encyclopedia of the Blues	3/5 stars

Nothin' but the Blues is a debut studio album by American blues musician Gary B. B. Coleman. The album was initially released by Coleman via his own Mister B.s Records label in 1986 and re-released in 1987 by Ichiban Records label to positive critical reviews.

== Reception ==
Niles J. Frantz of AllMusic gave the album four and half stars out of five, commenting "With a darker overall tone, it's sadder and more introspective, and one of his more consistent records. It includes two very good slow blues, "Let Me Love You Baby" and "Shame on You."

== Track listing ==
No.	Title	Writer(s)	Length
1.	"Stealing Your Love Tonight"	Coleman	3:24
2.	"The Stumble"	Freddie King, Sonny Thompson	3:02
3.	"Let Me Love You Baby"	Willie Dixon	7:27
4.	"Shame on You"	Bill Doggett	3:36
5.	"One Eyed Woman"		4:23
6.	"Honky Tonk Part 3"	Bill Doggett	4:54
7.	"I Love You So"	Coleman	3:54
8.	"I Won't Be Your Fool"	Coleman	4:27
Total length:			43:35

== Personnel ==
- Gary B.B. Coleman – primary artist, producer
- Michael Slade – bass guitar
- Lawrence Wilburn – bass
- James Big Foot Harrison – drums
- Jerome Fredrick – keyboards
- Kelvin Drake – rhythm guitar
