= Crocodile Love =

Studio album by Juluka
- Released: 1997
- Genre: World
- Label: Universal

Juluka chronology
Le Rock Zoulou de Johnny Clegg & Sipho Mchunu (1988)	Crocodile Love (1997)

Alternate cover entitled Ya Vuka Inkunzi - The Bull has Risen, released in South Africa

Crocodile Love is the final studio album from Juluka, a South African band led by Johnny Clegg and Sipho Mchunu. It was first released in 1997. It was entitled Ya Vuka Inkunzi - The Bull has Risen in South Africa.

== Track listing ==
1. Love Is Just A Dream (Tatazela)
2. Crocodile Love
3. Tholakele
4. My Big Lady (Studla Sami)
5. Isoka Lizo Kuthatha
6. Journey's End (Emalonjeni)
7. Umuzi Wami
8. Circle Of Light
9. Thandazani
10. Ubaba Akalele
11. Makhelwane
12. Crocodile Love (remix)
13. Crocodile Love (extended remix)
14. Laduma (South Africa World Cup Anthem)

The last three tracks did not appear on Ya Vuka Inkunzi.
