= Gary B.B. Coleman =

American singer (1947–1994)

Background information
- Born: Gary Don Coleman; January 1, 1947; Paris, Texas
- Died: February 14, 1994 (aged 47); Shreveport, Louisiana
- Genres: Soul blues
- Occupations: Musician, songwriter, producer
- Instruments: Guitar, vocals
- Years active: Late 1970s–1994
- Label: Ichiban

Gary B.B. Coleman (January 1, 1947 – February 21, 1994) was an American soul blues guitarist, singer, songwriter and record producer.

Originally a local musician turned blues promoter and session musician, Coleman recorded his debut album in 1986, which was re-released by Ichiban Records. He issued several other albums and produced most of Ichiban's blues catalogue until his death, in 1994. On many occasions, Coleman undertook multi-instrumentalist duties in the recording studio. He acknowledged both B.B. King, with his "B.B." moniker, and a fellow Texan, Freddie King.

== Biography ==
Coleman was born in Paris, Texas. He was working alongside Freddie King by the age of 15. He later supported Lightnin' Hopkins in concert and went on to form his own group. At this time he started simultaneously booking acts into nightclubs across three states, Texas, Oklahoma, and Colorado. This dual lifestyle in the Southwest continued for nearly twenty years. In 1985, he created his own independent record label, Mr. B's Records, and issued a single, "One Eyed Woman", and his debut album, Nothin' but the Blues, the following year. The album proved to be popular. Ichiban Records signed Coleman to a recording contract and duly re-released Nothin' but the Blues on its label in 1987.

If You Can Beat Me Rockin' (1988) followed, and in the same year Coleman's duties with Ichiban expanded to include record production for other acts, songwriting, and acting as an A&R scout. He released six more albums up to 1992 and was responsible for production duties on albums by Blues Boy Willie, Chick Willis, Little Johnny Taylor, and Buster Benton (Money's the Name of the Game, 1989).

He continued to write material for others and sometimes played guitar and keyboards on their records. His own albums featured songs he wrote, such as "I Fell in Love on a One Night Stand" and "If You Can Beat Me Rockin' (You Can Have My Chair)".

Coleman continued to combine various roles successfully until his early death in 1994 from a stroke and heart attack.

== Discography ==
- Nothin' but the Blues (1987), Ichiban (number 74, Billboard R&B chart)
- If You Can Beat Me Rockin'... (1988), Ichiban
- One Night Stand (1989), Ichiban
- Dancin' My Blues Away (1990), Ichiban
- Romance Without Finance Is a Nuisance (1991), Ichiban
- The Best of Gary B.B. Coleman (1991), Ichiban
- Too Much Weekend (1992), Ichiban
- Cocaine Annie (1994), Icehouse Records

== See also ==
- List of soul-blues musicians
