= Ubuhle Bemvelo =

Studio album by Juluka
- Released: 1982
- Length: 36:37
- Label: EMI/MINC (original South African release); Rhythm Safari (current releases)
- Producer: Hilton Rosenthal

Juluka chronology
African Litany (1981)	Ubuhle Bemvelo (1982)	Scatterlings (1982)

Ubuhle Bemvelo is a studio album from Juluka, a South African band led by Johnny Clegg and Sipho Mchunu. It was first released in 1982. The title means "natural beauty" or "the beauty of nature". All the songs on the album were in isiZulu.

== Recording and composition ==
Unlike Juluka's previous two albums, Ubuhle Bemvelo was not composed as an album, but was a composite of songs in isiZulu previously written by band leaders Johnny Clegg and Sipho Mchunu, including from a period when they had been a musical duo. Lyrically the album used imagery of working class life. This album was the first to feature two new members of Juluka: Gary Van Zyl on bass guitar, and Zola Mtiya on percussion. Musically the album had a more Pop-oriented sound than the band's previous work, drawing on mbaqanga and township jive. The album was heavier on vocals, and lighter in its use of the keyboard.

== Release and reception ==
The album was released in November 1981. Its final track was a version of Woza Friday that became the band's first major hit. The track "Umfazi Omdala" became a common feature of Clegg's live performances, and an English translation of it appeared on Juluka's next album Scatterlings as "Umbaqanga Music". A retrospective review on the music website AllMusic was positive, describing the album as a "timeless record".

== Track listing ==
All tracks composed by Johnny Clegg; except where indicated

1. Umfazi omdala 3'30
2. Dumazile 3'40
3. Bazothini 3'55
4. Zingane zami 3'30
5. Biza 3'40
6. Sonqoba 3'35
7. Umgane wami 3'50
8. Inhliziyo yegwala 4'10
9. Soweto 3'40
10. Woza Friday 3'40

Total: 36'37

== Personnel ==
- Johnny Clegg - vocals, guitar
- Sipho Mchunu - guitar, percussion, vocals
- Gary Van Zyl - bass guitar, percussion, vocals
- Zola Mtiya - drums, percussion, vocals
