= MINC =

Scripting language

MINC ("MINC Is Not C") is a data specification language written in the mid-1980s by a Princeton University graduate student named Lars Graf. This kind of naming is known as a recursive acronym.

It contains many (though not all) of the syntactical capabilities of the C programming language, and can be used to implement simple procedural programs that can be executed by a runtime parser (that is to say, MINC does not need to be compiled in any way).

MINC continues to be used only in a handful of programs written in the 1980s (e.g. Real-Time Cmix). It has been for all intents and purposes superseded by modern scripting languages such as Perl, Python, and Tcl.

A controversial aspect of the language is whether it is pronounced "mink" or "min-see".
