= Universal Men =

Studio album by Juluka
- Released: 1979
- Length: 40:09
- Label: CBS
- Producer: Hilton Rosenthal

Juluka chronology
Universal Men (1979)	African Litany (1981)

Universal Men is the debut album from Juluka, a South African band led by Johnny Clegg and Sipho Mchunu. It was first released in 1979 and has acquired the status of a classic album in the history of South African music. The album explores the experiences of Zulu migrant workers, caught between his traditional rural background and the city where he lives and works.

== Recording and composition ==
In addition to Clegg, Mchunu, and other regular Juluka band members, the album features studio musicians including Colin Pratley of the progressive rock band Freedom's Children and jazz artists Robbie Jansen, Mervyn Africa and Sipho Gumede. The album arose from open-ended and heavily experimental studio sessions. Musically, it fused Western and African folk music as well as jazz, and its sound was heavily influenced by Jansen's flute and saxophone playing. The album cover featured Mchunu and Clegg posed by the entrance to a mine.

Lyrically the album focuses on migrant labor and its role in building the wealth. The title track references a poem by Pablo Neruda. In an interview in 2000, Clegg said that while composing songs in Universal Men he was inspired by A Seventh Man by John Berger, which examined migrant labor in Europe, and which Clegg had been reading at the time. The book's themes include migrant journeys and the important role played by people often seen as being at the periphery of modern life. According to scholar Richard Pithouse, these themes permeate Universal Men. Three songs — "Sky People", "Universal Men", and "Old Eyes", are portraits of migrant characters, and the promise and heartbreak of their homecomings. Other songs concern Zulu cosmology. "Inkunzi Ayihlabi Ngokumisa" plays on a Zulu folktale containing an allegory about power, which was sometimes interpreted as a political commentary about the weak being able to defeat the strong.

== Release and reception ==
Universal Men was released in October 1979. Juluka's early albums did not receive much airplay from the South African Broadcasting Corporation (SABC) at the time because the racially mixed band and fusion of Western and African music were contrary to the country's apartheid policy at the time.

However the album's release coincided with the launch of Capital Radio 604, the station which broke the SABC's monopoly. Juluka's producer took it to the station, and "Africa" became the first local number one on the Capital Countdown.

According to scholar Richard Pithouse, Universal Men was a landmark contribution to South African music in its blending of genres and lyrical content, with a poetry that was "...superb, arguably unmatched in any South African music in English". Pithouse stated that the album cohesive despite the inclusion of songs in both isiZulu and English, and ones composed by both Clegg and Mchunu. He said that although the album did not contain "revolutionary sloganeering", it was political in its "recognition of being, of an equal wholeness at the level of being".

== Track listing ==
1. "Sky People" – 5:08
2. "Universal Men" – 4:46
3. "Thula 'Mtanami" – 4:11
4. "Deliwe" – 5:21
5. "Unkosibomvu" – 5:05
6. "Africa" – 3:37
7. "Uthando Luphelile" – 5:02
8. "Old Eyes" – 3:24
9. "Inkunzi Ayihlabi Ngokumisa" – 2:58

== Personnel ==
- Mervyn Africa, keyboards & synthesizer
- Johnny Clegg, lead & backing vocals, guitars, percussion & umhuphe mouth bow
- Sipho Gumede, bass guitar
- Robbie Jansen, flute & saxophone
- Gilbert Mathews, drums
- Sipho Mchunu, lead & backing vocals, guitars & concertina
- Paul Petersen, electric guitars
- Colin Pratley, african drums

Brass – Duke Makasi, George Tyefumani, Thabo Mashishi

Backing Vocals – Anneline Malebo, Bafazane Qoma, Samson Makhunga, Thoko Ndlozi, Umncengeni Ngubane, Umsuthu Nxele, Umvovo Shelembe, Vayisa Mahlaba
