= Sipho Mchunu =

South African musician (born 1951)

- Born: 1951 (age 74–75); Kranskop, South Africa
- Occupation: Musician
- Known for: Work with band Juluka

Sipho Mchunu (born 1951, Kranskop, South Africa) is a South African musician best known for his work in the band Juluka from the 1970s to the 1980s.

Mchunu's compositions, vocals and guitar work brought Zulu folk styles such as maskandi and mbaqanga to a wider audience both in South Africa and internationally.

Along with his work with Juluka he has also released three solo maskanda albums.

== Discography ==
=== With Juluka ===
==== Studio albums ====
- 1979: Universal Men
- 1981: African Litany
- 1982: Ubuhle Bemvelo
- 1982: Scatterlings
- 1983: Work For All
- 1984: Stand Your Ground (Juluka album)
- 1984: Musa Ukungilandela
- 1984: The International Tracks
- 1997: Crocodile Love (released in South Africa as Ya Vuka Inkunzi)

==== Live albums ====
- 1986: Juluka Live: The Good Hope Concerts
- 1992: South Africa 9: Johnny Clegg & Sipho Mchunu (Duo Juluka) + Ladysmith Black Mambazo: Cologne Zulu Festival (recorded 1977 & 1981)

==== Collections ====
- 1991: The Best of Juluka
- 1996: Putumayo Presents A Johnny Clegg & Juluka Collection

=== Solo albums ===
- 1989: Yithi Esavimba
- 1990: Umhlaba uzobuya
- 2021: Selula
