= Scatterlings of Africa =

Song

"Scatterlings of Africa" is a 1982 song by the South African band Juluka, first released on their 1982 album Scatterlings. It was re-released in 1987 by Juluka's successor band Savuka on Third World Child. The song was a commercial success, charting in France and the United Kingdom. Its lyrics explore the "myriad dislocations" experienced by South Africa. The rousing and upbeat music incorporated Zulu influences. The song introduced the music of Johnny Clegg, the cofounder of Juluka and Savuka, to Western audiences.

== Background and composition ==
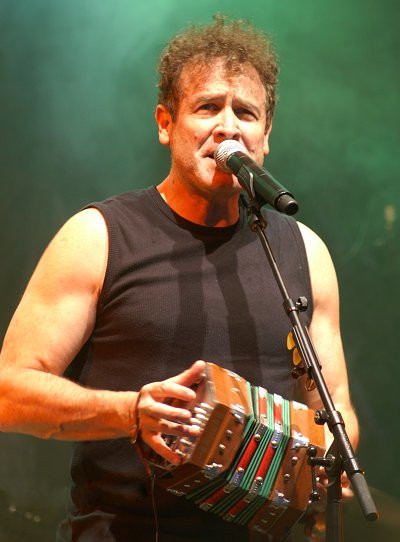
Johnny Clegg, pictured in 2009

Juluka (meaning "sweat" in Zulu) was founded in 1969 by Johnny Clegg and Sipho Mchunu. They mixed Zulu music with influences from rock and Celtic music. As a multiracial band in apartheid-era South Africa, Juluka frequently had trouble with the police, and their songs were banned by state-run radio stations, but their brand of Afro-pop nonetheless became popular.

The song's lyrics have been described as "reflecting the myriad dislocations of South African society," and, according to scholar Timothy Taylor, the story of "the hungry, the searching, all trying to make a better South Africa". The song's chorus illustrated its themes, also present in other compositions by Clegg: "They are the scatterlings of Africa/Each uprooted one/On the road to Phelamanga/Where the world began/I love the scatterlings of Africa/Each and every one/In their hearts a burning hunger/Beneath the copper sun."

According to Clegg, however, the song instead refers to all humans sharing a common African ancestry: "Africa is the cradle of humankind, after all, and it is the continent from where humans made their way north, south, east and west." He wrote it while teaching anthropology classes at Witwatersrand University, to impress upon his white students the interconnectedness of all humanity. "[Clegg] reminded us that we are all 'scatterlings of Africa'. Africa is the cradle of humankind and all of us trace our roots to the continent where Homo sapiens evolved," the song "reinforcing a sense of belonging to the human family."

Although "Scatterlings of Africa" uses rousing and upbeat music, it contains musical elements that reflect the themes of the lyrics, including the use of 7/4 meter, denying the listener a regular downbeat. The song's introduction is played in a 4/4 meter. The song switches between major and minor keys, a device which, according to scholar Timothy Taylor, reflects its rejection of fixed views of identity and social position. It thus implies that "Everyone is a scatterling, everyone is displaced by apartheid, [everyone] is left without a stable home or identity."

As with other songs by Juluka, "Scatterlings of Africa" is influenced by Zulu "ngoma" dance and associated music, as seen in the repeated cycle of vocables, typically rendered as "Ji oyi hmm, oyi hmm hmm" in the introduction. The phrase is sung with prominent bass and a heavy beat. In the later portion of the song, the same phrase creates a counterpoint with the phrase "O lala, o lala", sung at a high pitch by Clegg. In a 1987 cover by Savuka, founded by Clegg after Juluka disbanded, the bass drums are enhanced in volume, creating an exceptionally resonant sound. The original version of the song was somewhat shorter than five minutes; Savuka's version also removed a verse, and was thus approximately a minute shorter.

== Release and reception ==
"Scatterlings of Africa" was released in 1982 as the first track of Juluka's fourth album, Scatterlings. It was released again in 1987 by Savuka, on their album Third World Child. A remixed version was used on the soundtrack of the 1988 film Rain Man.

Upon the single's initial release, Mark Cooper of Record Mirror characterised the song as an "acoustic ballad celebrating Africa and resorting to a warrior-like chorus". He also posited that the song "could do for Africa what 'Mull of Kintyre' did for the Scottish Isles." The track was a top-50 hit in the U.K, while Savuka's version charted in France and other countries. The original 1982 version of the song peaked at No. 106 on the Billboard Bubbling Under Hot 100 Chart in June 1983.

The song exposed Clegg's music to Western audiences, and became a staple of his live performances and a mainstay on compilations of his songs. Kevin Smokler of Paste mentioned that fans of Clegg's work would refer to themselves as "Scatterlings" on early online message boards and forums. The song's commercial success allowed Clegg to leave his academic position as an anthropologist at the University of the Witwatersrand, to become a full-time musician.
