= Johnny Clegg =

British and South African musician and anthropologist (1953–2019)

Johnny Clegg OBE OIS
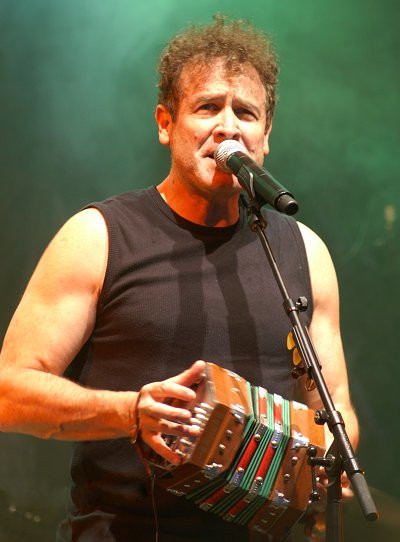
- Clegg performing live in 2009
- Born: Jonathan Paul Clegg; 7 June 1953; Bacup, England
- Died: 16 July 2019 (aged 66); Johannesburg, Gauteng, South Africa
- Other name: Le Zoulou Blanc
- Citizenship: United Kingdom; South Africa
- Occupations: Singer; songwriter; instrumentalist; dancer; anthropologist anti-apartheid activist
- Spouse: Jenny Bartlett (m. 1988)
- Children: Jesse Clegg
- Musical career
- Genres: Mbaqanga; maskandi; Afro-pop; Zulu music; acoustic rock; alternative rock; indie rock; pop rock; world; folk
- Instruments: Vocals; guitar; concertina
- Years active: 1969–2018
- Label: Capitol
- Formerly of: Juluka; Savuka
- Website: johnnyclegg.com

Jonathan Paul Clegg, OBE OIS (7 June 1953 – 16 July 2019) was a British and South African musician, singer-songwriter, dancer, anthropologist and anti-apartheid activist.

He first performed as part of a duo - Johnny & Sipho - with Sipho Mchunu which released its first single, "Woza Friday" in 1976. The two then went on to form the band Juluka which released its debut album in 1979. In 1986, Clegg founded the band Savuka, and also recorded as a solo act, occasionally reuniting with his earlier band partners. Sometimes called Le Zoulou Blanc (French: [lə zulu blɑ̃], for "The White Zulu"), he was an important figure in South African popular music and a prominent white figure in the resistance to apartheid, becoming for a period the subject of investigation by the security branch of the South African Police. His songs mixed English with Zulu lyrics, and also combined working class African music with various forms of Western popular music.

== Early life and career ==
Clegg was born on 7 June 1953 in Bacup, Lancashire, to an English father of Scottish descent, Dennis Clegg, and a Rhodesian mother, Muriel Braudo. Braudo's family were Jewish immigrants from Belarus and Poland and Clegg had a secular Jewish upbringing, learning about the Ten Commandments but refusing to have a bar mitzvah - until later in life, when he became a father and decided to have a "double" bar mitzvah with his son Jesse. He moved with his mother to Southern Rhodesia (now Zimbabwe) at age 6 months, and his parents divorced soon afterwards. At age six, he moved to South Africa with his mother, also spending part of a year in Israel during his childhood.

He grew up in Yeoville, then a predominantly Jewish inner city neighbourhood of Johannesburg and encountered the demi-monde of the city's Zulu migrant workers' music and dance. Under the tutelage of Charlie Mzila, a flat cleaner by day and musician by night, Clegg mastered both the Zulu language and the maskandi guitar and the isishameni dance styles of the migrants. Clegg's involvement with black musicians often led to arrests for trespassing on government property and for contravening the Group Areas Act. He was first arrested at the age of 15 for violating apartheid-era laws in South Africa banning people of different races from congregating together after curfew hours.

At the age of 16, he met Sipho Mchunu, a Zulu migrant worker with whom he began performing music. The partnership, which they named Juluka, began in 1969, and was profiled in the 1970s television documentary Beats of the Heart: Rhythm of Resistance.

After graduating with a BA (Hons) in Social Anthropology from the University of Witwatersrand, Clegg pursued an academic career for four years where he lectured and wrote several seminal scholarly papers on Zulu music and dance. In the early stages of his musical career, Clegg combined his music with the study of anthropology at Wits, where he was influenced by the work of David Webster, a social anthropologist who was later assassinated in 1989.

He preceded each song with snippets of Zulu culture, information, commentary, humor and personal anecdotes relevant and unique to that song, occasionally also incorporating aspects of his Jewish roots in songs such as "Jericho", "Jarusalema" and "Warsaw 1943".

== Juluka ==
Juluka was an unusual musical partnership for the time in South Africa, with a white man (Clegg) and a black man (Mchunu) performing together. The band, which grew to a six-member group (with three white musicians and three black musicians) by the time it released its first album Universal Men in 1979, faced harassment and censorship, with Clegg later remarking that it was "impossible" to perform in public in South Africa. The group tested the apartheid-era laws, touring and performing in private venues, including universities, churches, hostels, and even private homes in order to attract an audience, as national broadcasters would not play their music.

Just as unusually, the band's music combined Zulu, Celtic, and rock elements, with both English and Zulu lyrics. Those lyrics often contained coded political messages and references to the battle against apartheid, although Clegg maintained that Juluka was not originally intended to be a political band. "Politics found us," he told The Baltimore Sun in 1996. In a 1989 interview with the Sunday Times, Clegg denied the label of "political activist." "For me a political activist is someone who has committed himself to a particular ideology. I don't belong to any political party. I stand for human rights."

Juluka's music was both implicitly and explicitly political; not only was the fact of the success of the band (which openly celebrated African culture in a bi-racial band) a thorn in the flesh of a political system based on racial separation, the band also produced some explicitly political songs. For example, the album Work for All (which includes a song with the same title) picked up on South African trade union slogans in the mid-1980s. As a result of their political messages and racial integration, Clegg and other band members were arrested several times and concerts routinely broken up.

Despite being ignored and often harassed by the South African government at home, Juluka were able to tour internationally, playing in Europe, Canada, and the United States, and had two platinum and five gold albums, becoming an international success. The group was disbanded in 1985, when Mchunu retired from music and went back to his family farm to return to his people's traditional life of raising cattle. It was briefly reconstituted when Mchunu and Clegg reunited in the mid-1990s, releasing one final album in 1997 before breaking up for good.

== Savuka ==
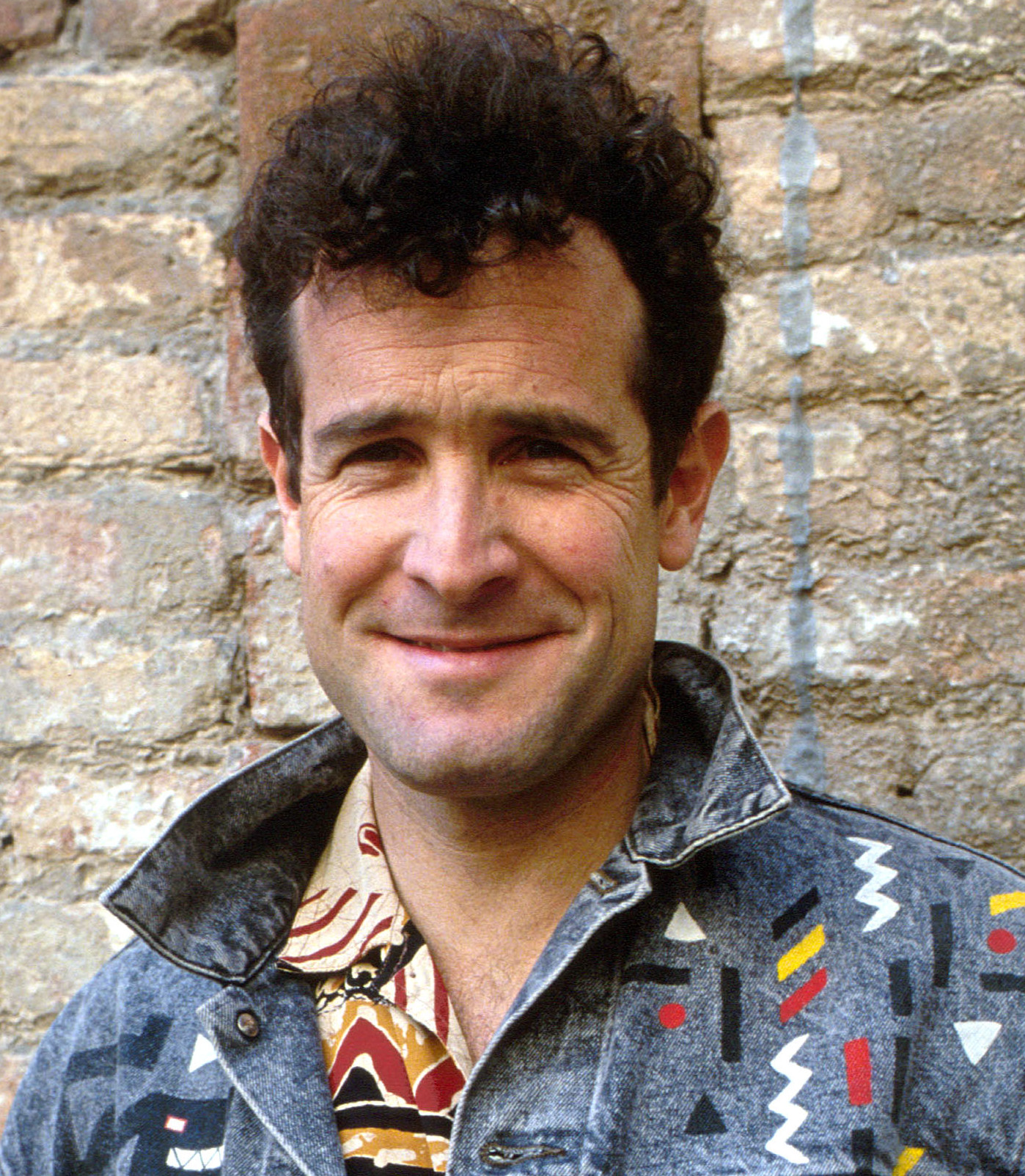
Clegg in 1992

Together with the black musician and dancer Dudu Zulu, Clegg went on to form his second inter-racial band, Savuka, in 1986, continuing to blend African music with European influences. The group's first album, Third World Child, broke international sales records in several European countries, including France. The band went on to record several more albums, including Heat, Dust and Dreams, which received a Grammy Award nomination. Johnny Clegg and Savuka played both at home and abroad, even though Clegg's refusal to stop performing in apartheid-era South Africa created tensions with the international anti-apartheid movement. Despite his high-profile (and personally hazardous) opposition to the South African regime, this led to Clegg's expulsion from the British Musicians' Union, in what one writer has since called "a fit of pique". In one instance, the band drew such a large crowd in Lyon that Michael Jackson cancelled a concert there, complaining that Clegg and his group had "stole[n] all his fans". In 1993, the band dissolved after Dudu Zulu was shot and killed while attempting to mediate a taxi war.

== Juluka reunion and solo career ==
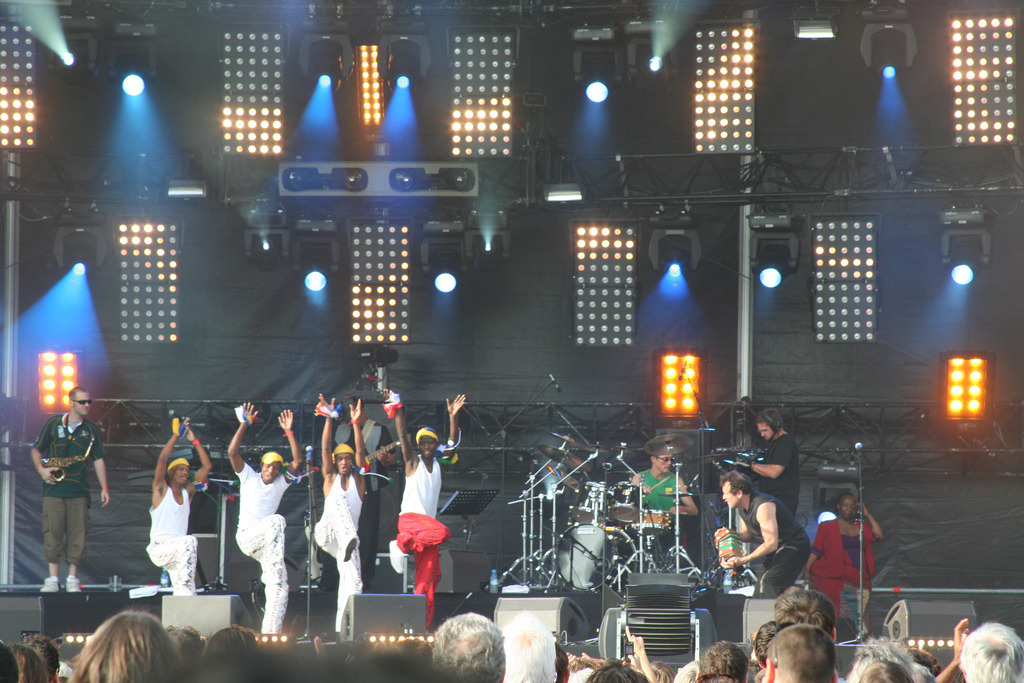
Johnny Clegg at la fête de l'Humanité, France, 2007

Briefly reunited in the mid-1990s, Clegg and Mchunu reformed Juluka, released a new album, and toured throughout the world in 1996 with King Sunny Adé. In the following years, Clegg recorded several solo albums.

During one concert in 1999, he was joined on stage by South African President Nelson Mandela, who danced as Johnny Clegg sang the protest song "Asimbonanga" that Savuka had dedicated to Mandela. Asimbonanga became an anthem of protest for the Mass Democratic Movement's umbrella organisation, the United Democratic Front. During Mandela's illness and death in 2013, the video of the concert attracted considerable media attention outside South Africa.

His touring schedule was abbreviated in 2017 after he underwent surgery for pancreatic cancer, and Clegg performed his last concert in Harare, Zimbabwe on 3 November 2018.

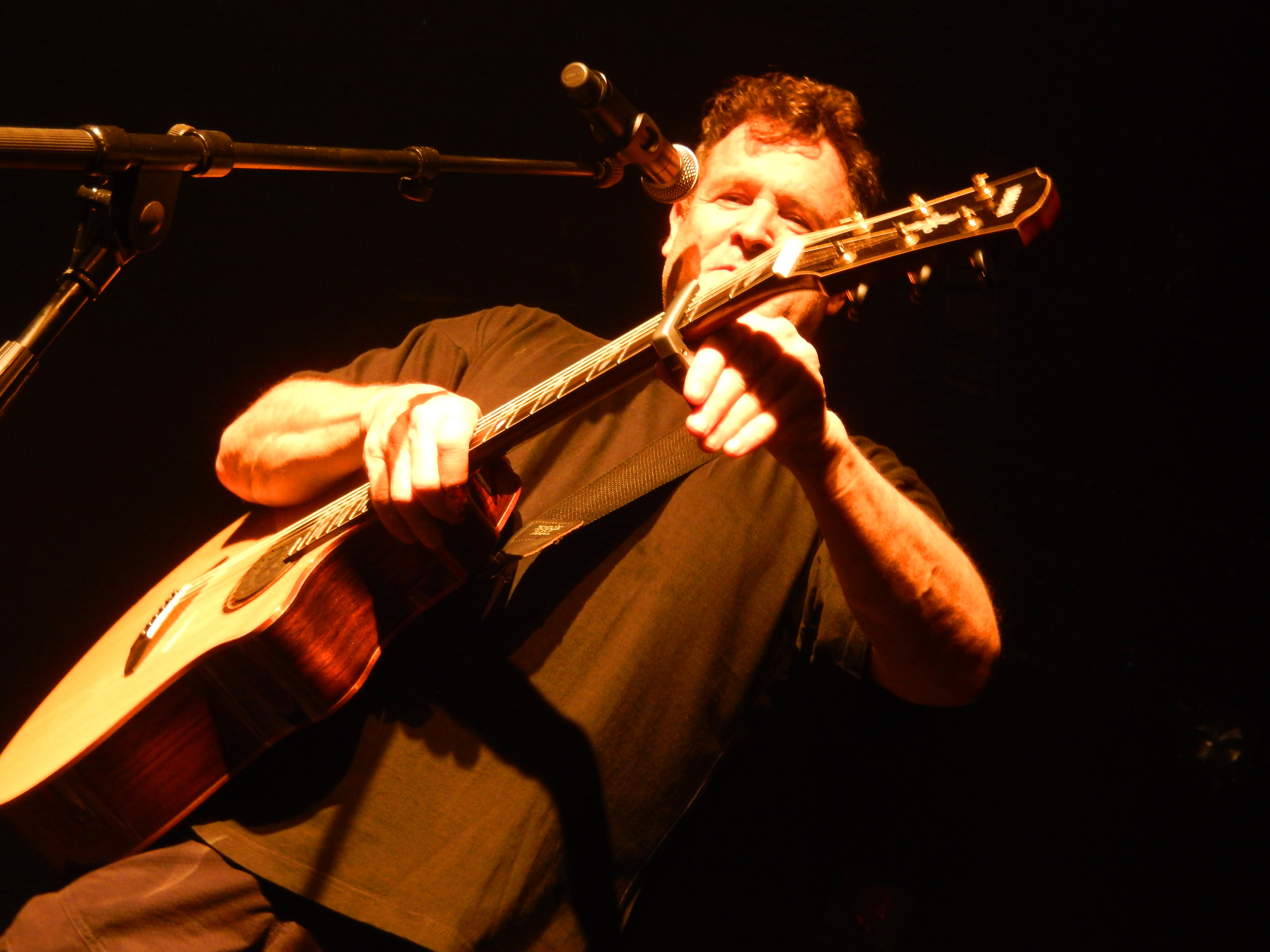
Clegg on stage in 2013

.

== Illness and death ==
Johnny Clegg was diagnosed with pancreatic cancer in 2015, which ultimately led to his death on 16 July 2019. He died in his Johannesburg home surrounded by loved ones and was laid to rest the following day in Westpark Cemetery in Johannesburg. Clegg was survived by his wife, Jenny, and his two sons, Jesse (also a musician) and Jaron.

In 2018, during Clegg's illness, over 50 South African musicians collaborated to record Clegg's song "The Crossing" as a tribute to Clegg and his contribution to South African music. The song was originally written by Clegg in memory of bandmate Dudu Zulu who was killed in 1992, and refers to the crossing from life to death.

== In popular culture ==
Clegg's song "Scatterlings of Africa" gave him his only entries in the UK Singles Chart, reaching No. 44 in February 1983 with Juluka and No. 75 in May 1987 as Johnny Clegg and Savuka. The following year the song was featured on the soundtrack to the 1988 Oscar-winning film Rain Man.

His song "Life is a Magic Thing" was featured in FernGully: The Last Rainforest.

Savuka's song "Dela" was featured on the soundtrack of the 1997 film George of the Jungle and its 2003 sequel, while "Great Heart" was the title song for the 1986 film Jock of the Bushveld and the end credits song for the 2000 film Whispers: An Elephant's Tale. "Cruel, Crazy, Beautiful World" was featured in the 1990 film Opportunity Knocks and 1991 film Career Opportunities.

Jimmy Buffett recorded "Great Heart" for his 1988 album, Hot Water.

== Recognition ==
- 1991: awarded the Chevalier des Arts et Lettres (Knight of Arts and Letters) by the French Government.
- 2004: voted 23rd in the SABC3's Great South Africans.
- 2007: received an honorary doctorate in music from the University of the Witwatersrand.
- 2011: received an honorary Doctor of Laws degree from City University of New York School of Law.
- 2012: received the Order of Ikhamanga, Silver as part of the National Orders ceremony. This award is the highest honour a citizen can receive in South Africa. It was presented by President Jacob Zuma.
- 2012: received an honorary Doctor of Humane Letters degree from Dartmouth College, Hanover, NH, USA.
- 2013: received an honorary Doctorate in Music from the University of KwaZulu-Natal, South Africa.
- 2015: was made an Officer of the Order of the British Empire.
- 2018: received an Honorary Doctorate of Philosophy Degree in Visual and Performing Arts from the Durban University of Technology alongside his Juluka bandmate, Sipho Mchunu.

== Works ==
=== Academic publications ===
- Clegg, Jonathan (1981). "Ukubuyisa Isidumbu – "Bringing back the body": An examination into the ideology of vengeance in the Msinga and Mpofana rural locations (1882–1944)". In Bonner, P. (ed.). Working Papers in Southern African Studies. Vol. 2. Johannesburg: Ravan Press (in association with The African Studies Institute). pp. 164–198. ISBN 0854946446. OCLC 243478214.
- Clegg, Jonathan (1981). Tracey, Andrew (ed.). "The Music of Zulu Immigrant Workers in Johannesburg: A Focus on Concertina and Guitar". Papers Presented at the Symposium on Ethnomusicology. Grahamstown: International Library of African Music.
- Clegg, Jonathan (1982). Tracey, Andrew (ed.). "Towards an understanding of African Dance: The Zulu Isishameni Style". Papers Read at Second Symposium on Ethnomusicology, 24–26 September 1981, Rhodes University, Grahamstown, South Africa. Grahamstown: Institute of Social and Economic Research.
- Clegg, Jonathan (1984). "Examination of the Umzansi dance style". In Tracey, Andrew (ed.). Papers presented at the Third and Fourth symposia on Ethnomusicology: Music Department, University of Natal, Durban, 16 to 19 September 1982; Music Department, Rhodes University, 7 to 8 October 1983. Grahamstown: Institute of Social and Economic Research. ISBN 086810096X. OCLC 13658380.
- Clegg, Johnny and Drewett, Michael (2006). "Why Don't You Sing about the Leaves and the Dreams? Reflecting on Music Censorship in Apartheid South Africa". In Drewett, Michael and Cloonan, Martin (eds.). Popular Music Censorship in Africa. Aldershot: Ashgate Publishing. pp. 127–136. ISBN 9780754652915 – via Internet Archive.

=== Autobiography ===
- Clegg, Johnny (2021). Scatterling of Africa - My Early Years. Johannesburg: Pan Macmillian. ISBN 9781770107588.

== Discography ==
=== Studio Albums ===
==== Juluka ====
- Universal Men (1979)
- African Litany (1981)
- Ubuhle Bemvelo (1982)
- Scatterlings (1982)
- Work For All (1983)
- Stand Your Ground (1984)
- Musa Ukungilandela (1984)
- The International Tracks (1984)
- Crocodile Love (1997) [released in South Africa as Ya Vuka Inkunzi ]

==== Savuka ====
- Johnny Clegg and Savuka (1986) [EP]
- Third World Child (1987)
- Shadow Man (1988)
- Cruel, Crazy, Beautiful World (1989)
- Heat, Dust and Dreams (1993)

==== Solo Albums ====
- Third World Child (1985)
- New World Survivor (2002)
- One Life (2006)
- Human (2010)
- King of Time (2017)

=== Live ===
==== Juluka ====
- The Good Hope Concerts (1986)
- South Africa 9: Cologne Zulu Festival (1992) [with Ladysmith Black Mambazo, recorded in 1977 and 1981]

==== Savuka ====
- Live and Rarities (2001)

==== Solo ====
- A South African Story - Live at the Nelson Mandela Theatre (2003)
- Best, Live & Unplugged: Clegg at the Baxter Theatre Cape Town (2014)

=== Compilation ===
==== Juluka ====
- The Best of Juluka (1991)
- A Johnny Clegg & Juluka Collection (1996)
- Heart of the Dancer (2006)

==== Savuka ====
- In My African Dream (1994)

==== Solo ====
- Power of One: the Songs of Johnny Clegg (2008)
- My Favourite Zulu Street Guitar Songs (2010)

=== DVD ===
- 2003 Johnny Clegg Live at the Nelson Mandela Theatre
- 2004 Live! and more...
- 2010 Johnny Clegg 30th Anniversary Concert at Emmarentia Dam
