= Juluka =

South African musical group

- Origin: Johannesburg, South Africa
- Genres: World, folk, Zulu, Maskanda, Mbaqanga, Rock
- Years active: 1979–1985, 1997
- Labels: Warner Bros. Rhythm Safari
- Past members: Johnny Clegg; Sipho Mchunu; Johnny Boshoff; Derek de Beer; Robbie Jansen; Zola Mtiya; Gary Van Zyl; Tim Hoare; Scorpion Madondo; Glenda Millar; Cyril Mnculwane

Juluka was a South African band formed by Johnny Clegg and Sipho Mchunu. Juluka means "sweat" in Zulu, and was the name of a bull owned by Mchunu. The band was closely associated with the mass movement against apartheid.

== History ==
At the age of 14, Clegg met Zulu street musician Charlie Mzila, who taught him Zulu music and dancing over the following two years. In 1969 Johnny Clegg and Sipho Mchunu met in Johannesburg when young Sipho went there to find work. The 18-year-old Mchunu challenged the 16-year-old Clegg to a guitar contest, and the two became friends. Soon, they were performing together on the streets and in what few other unofficial venues a multi-racial band could safely play in under apartheid. They were forced to keep a low profile and their success came from word of mouth instead of through traditional publicity. Clegg himself was arrested and beaten up by the police on several occasions for his activities, and also for the band's lyrics. For some commentators, Juluka was the band that had the greatest success in challenging the racial separateness of Apartheid. When performing, both black and white band members would appear on stage in traditional Zulu dress and perform the traditional Zulu dance together while singing in Zulu and English.

In 1976, Clegg and Mchunu released their debut single, "Uthi Angizule" as Jonathan Clegg & Sipho Mchunu, followed three years later by the debut Juluka album, the critically acclaimed Universal Men. The album's poetic lyrics were strongly influenced by John Berger's A Seventh Man as well as Pablo Neruda and Jean-Paul Sartre. Expanding to a quintet, they released a second album, African Litany, in late 1981. The album's lead single, "Impi", with its pointedly political lyrics about a defeat of the colonial British army by the Zulus at the Battle of Isandlwana, was banned by South African radio but became an underground hit. In contemporary South Africa it is often associated with national sports teams. The album garnered them their first international attention, and they were able to successfully tour in Europe and North America in 1982 and 1983. However, in June 1983, the British music magazine, NME, reported that they were initially banned by the Musicians Union as, ..."since it would not be possible to approve one of our bands working in South Africa, there is no possibility of an exchange". The ban was eventually lifted, with the group donating their fees to charity.

In South Africa, Juluka was also banned by Radio Bantu, a government approved radio station for the black population, which allegedly refused to play Juluka's music, because Clegg's efforts were seen as "an insult to the Zulu and their culture".

The group disbanded in 1985 when Mchunu moved back to the farm where he was born in Natal to take care of his family. Clegg went on to form a new band, Savuka, with whom he achieved even greater international success. In 1997, however, the two friends came back for a final album together, Ya Vuka Inkunzi later released as Crocodile Love. It did not receive the critical acclaim of early Juluka albums like Universal Men, African Litany, Work for All and Scatterlings.

== Music ==
The styles incorporated into Juluka's music are maskanda and mbaqanga, both of which are native to South Africa, and western folk and rock. The band employed various instruments besides the guitar and traditional Zulu instruments, such as the saxophone and, later, synthesizers. Ngoma dancing featured in some of their later songs.

Juluka's music undermined the stereotypic correlations of 'traditional' and 'primitive' on the one hand, and 'Western' and 'civilised' on the other. The band accomplished this through sophisticated blendings of musical elements that evoked 'Western' and Zulu culture in their songs' harmonies, rhythms, forms and more.

== Lyrics ==
While they were often written in metaphor, many of the band's lyrics were undeniably political. In "Universal Man" for example, Mchunu and Clegg describe a bull fight in which the small bull beats the big bull not by force but by skill, symbolising the victory of the underdog over his oppressor.

In keeping with their fashioning a sound out of both African and European musical traditions, Clegg's lyrics also contributed to Juluka's impact, exploring what it meant for Clegg as a white person to be African. As he explained in an interview: ‘the issue of being a white African and finding a place for European culture in a base of African music was an important aspect of what I was doing.’

== Discography ==
=== Albums ===
Studio

- 1979: Universal Men
- 1981: African Litany
- 1982: Ubuhle Bemvelo
- 1982: Scatterlings
- 1983: Work For All
- 1984: Musa Ukungilandela
- 1997: Crocodile Love (released in South Africa as Ya Vuka Inkunzi)

Live

- 1986: The Good Hope Concerts

Compilation

- 1984: Stand Your Ground
- 1984: The International Tracks
- 1988: Le Rock Zoulou de Johnny Clegg & Sipho (consisting of most of the tracks from Ubuhle Bemvelo and Musa Ukungilandela)
- 1991: The Best Of Juluka
- 1996: A Johnny Clegg And Juluka Collection
- 2006: Heart of the Dancer

=== Singles and EPs ===
- 1977: "Woza Friday" (debut single)
- 1981: "Impi"
- 1982: "Scatterlings of Africa" - AUS #93
- 1982: "Umbaqanga Music"
- 1982: "African Ideas"
- 1984: "Fever"
- 1984: "Ibhola Lethu"
- 1997: "Love Is Just a Dream (Tatazela) (Juluka / Johnny Clegg & Sipho Mchunu)

== Members ==
- Johnny Clegg – vocals, guitar (1969–1985, 1997; died 2019)
- Sipho Mchunu – guitar, percussion, vocals (1969–1985, 1997)
- Johnny Boshoff – bass guitar, percussion, vocals (1981–1982)
- Derek de Beer – drums, percussion, vocals (1981–1982, 1984–1985)
- Robbie Jansen – flute, saxophone, vocals (1981–1982; died 2010)
- Zola Mtiya – drums, percussion, vocals (1982–1984)
- Gary Van Zyl – bass guitar, percussion, vocals (1982–1985)
- Tim Hoare – keyboards, vocals (1982–1984)
- Scorpion Madondo – flute, saxophone, vocals (1982–1985; died 2010)
- Glenda Millar – keyboards, vocals (1983 – 1984)
- Cyril Mnculwane – keyboards, vocals (1984–1985; died 2019)
