= Errol Dyers =

- Born: 21 January 1952; South Africa
- Died: 21 July 2017 (aged 65) Cape Town, South Africa
- Genres: Jazz, South African music
- Occupation: Musician
- Instrument: Guitar
- Years active: 1973-2017
- Labels: Goema, Cape Jazz

Errol Dyers (29 March 1952 – 21 July 2017) was a South African musician, composer and guitarist and pioneer of Cape jazz/goema.

== Career ==
Dyers came from a musical family but taught himself music playing on the streets of Cape Town, and became known for his pioneering fusion of Cape jazz and goema. He performed alongside numerous other musicians, including Abdullah Ibrahim, Basil 'Manenberg' Coetzee, Robbie Jansen and Winston Mankunku.

Dyer was a member of the Sheer All Stars along with Paul Hanmer, McCoy Mrubata, Sipho Gumede and Frank Paco.

Colleague Molly Baron described him as “a genius” with the guitar and said that “had Errol been born in England or in America he would have been recognised as one of the world’s greatest guitarists.”

== Discography (incomplete) ==
- Sheer All Stars Indibano
- Sheer All Stars Live at the Blue Room
- Abdullah Ibrahim's Mantra Mode with Johnny Mekoa, Basil Coetzee, Robbie Jansen, Spencer Mbadu and Monty Weber.
- Remember – District 6, with Lionel Beukes, Sammy Hartman, Monty Weber, Basil Coetzee;
- All in One with Hilton Schilder and Steve Newman
- Kou Kou Wa

== Death ==
Dyers died of emphysema in Cape Town aged 65.
