= Sheer Sound =

South African independent record label

- Founded: 1994
- Founder: Damon Forbes
- Distributor: IRIS (South Africa)
- Genre: Jazz, rock, world, Afropop, house
- Country of origin: South Africa
- Official website: www.sheersound.co.za

Sheer Sound is a South African independent record label formed in 1994 by Damon Forbes.

== History ==
Sheer Sound was formed in November 1994, shortly after South Africa's first democratic elections. The label was initially a home for jazz and world music and fast gained a reputation for its extensive South African and African jazz catalogue.

By the mid-1990s, a young music marketer, Damon Forbes, was getting restless with the limited vision of his industry.

"I sunk my teeth into jazz because it carried a world music message for me; it was truly culturally representative.... I just looked at the market and I saw the economics of the people of South Africa changing, due to better access to education.... [And] the workplace was going to change; a lot more black people getting into jobs that are of medium and higher income levels.... With all that, comes the aspiration to listen to better quality music. [So] the market, in the long term, is going to increase."

With what he calls "R5 000 (just over $500) and a dream", Forbes established his own label, Sheer Sound. (Ansell 1994:269)

In 2006 two imprint labels, Seed and 2Feet Music, were formed under the Sheer Sound umbrella and has since released some of the most prolific rock and singer-songwriter music, respectively, in South Africa.

Sheer grew over the years to represent Beggars Banquet group, Concord, Ninja Tune, Cooking Vinyl, World Circuit and numerous others. They were also the South African distributor for labels such as Carrot Top Records, Lusafrica, Palm Pictures, Shanachie, Telarc, and Union Square Music, with their own CDs having seen a global market largely through its folk/rock imprint, 2 Feet.

In late 2014 Sheer Sound was acquired by Times Media LTD / the Gallo Record Company, and the two companies were merged.

== Roster ==
=== Singer-songwriter ===
- Farryl Purkiss
- Jeremy Loops
- Chris Letcher
- Nibs van der Spuy
- Shawn Phillips
- Baz Corden
- Simon van Gend

=== Rock ===
- Wonderboom
- Myepic
- Cassette (Outside of RSA only)
- Bed on Bricks
- Paul E. Flynn
- Martin Rocka and The Sick Shop
- Misled
- Pestroy
- Insek
- Libido
- Gently Scar'd
- Underbelly
- New Academics
- Lionel Bastos
- Elusion
- The Dirty Skirts
- Mann Friday
- Gonzo Republic
- eVoid
- Walt

=== Afropop ===
- Jeff Maluleke
- Jaziel Brothers
- Lesego
- Mina Nawe
- Phinda
- Oliver Mtukudzi
- Naledi

=== Jazz ===
- McCoy Mrubata
- Winston Mankunku Ngozi
- Paul Hanmer
- Louis Mhlanga
- Sipho Gumede
- Gavin Minter
- Tony Cox
- Ernie Smith

== Awards and nominations ==
Award	Year	Artist	Category	Title	Result
South African Music Awards (SAMA)
South African Music Awards (SAMA)	2009	340ml	Best Alternative Album	Sorry for the Delay	Won
South African Music Awards (SAMA)	2009	340ml	Best Duo or Group of the Year	Sorry for the Delay	Nominated
South African Music Awards (SAMA)	2009	340ml	Best Album of the Year	Sorry for the Delay	Nominated
South African Music Awards (SAMA)	2009	340ml	MTN Record of the Year	Sorry for the Delay	Nominated
South African Music Awards (SAMA)	2009	340ml	Best Producer	Sorry for the Delay	Nominated
South African Music Awards (SAMA)	2009	340ml	Best Engineer	Sorry for the Delay	Won
South African Music Awards (SAMA)	2009	Ernie Smith	Best Adult Contemporary Album (English)		Nominated
South African Music Awards (SAMA)	2009	Nibs van der Spuy	Best Instrumental Album	Autumn Light	Nominated
South African Music Awards (SAMA)	2009	Imbokodo	Best Pop Album (African)		Nominated
South African Music Awards (SAMA)	2009	Jaziel Brothers	Best Remix Of The Year		Nominated
South African Music Awards (SAMA)	2009	The Dirty Skirts	Best Rock Album	Daddy Don't Disco	Nominated
South African Music Awards (SAMA)	2009	Paul E. Flynn	Best Rock Album	Fields	Nominated
South African Music Awards (SAMA)	2009	Gavin Minter	Best Traditional Jazz Album	I'll Be Seeing You	Nominated
South African Music Awards (SAMA)	2009	Zim Ngqawana	Best Traditional Jazz Album		Won
South African Music Awards (SAMA)	2009	Oliver Mtukudzi	Best Traditional/Adult Contemporary DVD		Nominated
South African Music Awards (SAMA)	2008	Jaziel Brothers	Best Afro Pop Album	The Beginning	Won
South African Music Awards (SAMA)	2008	Underbelly	Best Alternative Album	"For A Cynical Science"	Nominated
South African Music Awards (SAMA)	2008	Insek	Best Alternative Album	"Maaiers"	Nominated
South African Music Awards (SAMA)	2008	New Academics	Best Alternative Album	"City Of Strange"	Nominated
South African Music Awards (SAMA)	2008	McCoy Mrubata	Best Male Artist	"Brasskap Sessions - Vol 1"	Nominated
South African Music Awards (SAMA)	2008	McCoy Mrubata	Best Traditional Jazz	"Brasskap Sessions - Vol 1"	Nominated
South African Music Awards (SAMA)	2008	Jeff Maluleke	Best Adult Contemporary African	"A Twist Of Jeff"	Nominated
South African Music Awards (SAMA)	2008	Musa Manzini & Lawrence Matshiza (For Jeff Maluleke)	Best Producer	"A Twist Of Jeff"	Nominated
South African Music Awards (SAMA)	2008	Phinda	Best Adult Contemporary African	"Yithi Paha"	Nominated
South African Music Awards (SAMA)	2008	Jaziel Brothers	Best PopAlbum	"The Beginning"	Nominated
South African Music Awards (SAMA)	2008	Mina Nawe	Best Urban Pop Album	"Njalo"	Nominated
South African Music Awards (SAMA)	2008	Tony Cox	Best Instrumental Album	"Blue Anthem"	Won
South African Music Awards (SAMA)	2007	Paul Hanmer	Best Male Artist	"Water & Lights"	Nominated
South African Music Awards (SAMA)	2007	Lesego	Best Newcomer	"Mymusic"	Nominated
South African Music Awards (SAMA)	2007	Paul Hanmer	Best Instrumental Jazz Album	"Water & Lights"	Won
South African Music Awards (SAMA)	2007	Four Forty	Best Instrumental Jazz Album	"Us+Them=1"	Nominated
South African Music Awards (SAMA)	2007	Chris Letcher	Best Adult Contemporary Album: English	"Frieze"	Nominated
South African Music Awards (SAMA)	2007	Wonderboom	Best Rock Album: English	"City Of Gold"	Nominated
South African Music Awards (SAMA)	2007	Chris Letcher	Best Rock Album: English	"Frieze"	Nominated
South African Music Awards (SAMA)	2007	Martin Rocka and the Sick Shop	Best Alternative Music Album	"Through Sick & Sin"	Nominated
South African Music Awards (SAMA)	2007	Prankster	Best Alternative Music Album	"Bravo"	Nominated
South African Music Awards (SAMA)	2007	Lesego	Best Pop Album: African	"Mymusic"	Won
South African Music Awards (SAMA)	2007	Oliver Mtukudzi	Best Compilation DVD	"Wonai"	Nominated
South African Music Awards (SAMA)	2006	Phinda	Best Adult Contemporary Album: African	"Mbheka Phesheya"	Won
South African Music Awards (SAMA)	2005	Wessel van Rensburg	Best Instrumental Album	"Song For E"	Won
South African Music Awards (SAMA)	2005	McCoy Mrubata	Best South African Traditional Jazz Album	"Discovery"	Won
South African Music Awards (SAMA)	2005	Evert de Munnick (Sakhile)	Best Engineer	"Togetherness"	Won
South African Music Awards (SAMA)	2005	Sipho Gumede & Ernie Smith	Best Joint Composition	""	Won
South African Music Awards (SAMA)	2004	Zim Ngqawana	Best Male Artist	"Zimphonic Suites"	Won
South African Music Awards (SAMA)	2004	Zim Ngqwana	Best South African Traditional Jazz Album	"Zimphonic Suites"	Won
South African Music Awards (SAMA)	2004	Andile Yenana & Winston Mankunku Ngozi (Winston Mankunku Ngozi)	Best Producer	""	Won
South African Music Awards (SAMA)	2004	Peter Pearlson (Zim Ngqwana)	Best Engineer	"Zimphonic Suites"	Won
South African Music Awards (SAMA)	2004	Gloria Bosman	Best Female Composer	"Nature Dances"	Won
MK Video Awards	2008	Chris Letcher	Best Roadtrip Video	"Deep Frieze"	Nominated
MK Video Awards	2008	Farryl Purkiss	Sexiest Video	"Better Days"	Nominated

== See also ==
- List of record labels
