= Mannenberg =

1974 Cape jazz composition by South African musician Abdullah Ibrahim

- The cover of the album on which "Mannenberg" was the first of two tracks. Photograph of Gladys Williams by Abdullah Ibrahim.

Song by Dollar Brand (Abdullah Ibrahim)

from the album Mannenberg – Is Where It's Happening
- Released: 1974; 52 years ago
- Genre: Cape jazz
- Length: 13:37
- Composer: Abdullah Ibrahim
- Producer: Rashid Vally

"Mannenberg" is a Cape jazz composition by South African musician Abdullah Ibrahim, first recorded in 1974. Driven into exile by the apartheid government, Ibrahim had been living in Europe and the United States during the 1960s and '70s, making brief visits to South Africa to record music. After a successful 1974 collaboration with producer Rashid Vally and a band that included Basil Coetzee and Robbie Jansen, Ibrahim began to record another album with these three collaborators and a backing band assembled by Coetzee. The piece was recorded during a session of improvisation, and includes a saxophone solo by Coetzee, which led to him receiving the sobriquet "Manenberg".

The piece incorporates elements of several other musical styles, including marabi, ticky-draai, and langarm, and became a landmark in the development of the genre of Cape jazz. The piece has been described as having a beautiful melody and catchy beat, conveying themes of "freedom and cultural identity." It was released under Ibrahim's former name Dollar Brand on the 1974 vinyl album Mannenberg – Is Where It's Happening. Named after the township of Manenberg, it was an instant hit, selling tens of thousands of copies within a few months of its release. It later became identified with the struggle against apartheid, partly due to Jansen and Coetzee playing it at rallies against the government, and was among the movement's most popular songs in the 1980s. The piece has been covered by other musicians, and has been included on several jazz collections.

== Background ==
Abdullah Ibrahim was born in Cape Town in 1934. Before his conversion to Islam in 1968, he was known as "Dollar Brand". He had a mixed racial heritage, making him a Coloured person according to the South African government. His mother played piano in a church and the style of the hymnal music she played would remain an influence on Ibrahim. In addition, he learned to play several genres of music during his youth in Cape Town, including marabi, mbaqanga, and American jazz. He became well known in jazz circles in Cape Town and Johannesburg, and in 1959, along with Kippie Moeketsi, Hugh Masekela, Jonas Gwangwa, Johnny Gertze, and Makaya Ntshoko, formed the mixed-race group The Jazz Epistles. Although the group avoided explicitly political activity, the apartheid government was suspicious of it and other jazz groups, and targeted them heavily during the increase in state repression following the Sharpeville massacre. The Epistles broke up, and in 1962 Ibrahim went into exile.

In the 1960s and '70s, Ibrahim and his wife Sathima Bea Benjamin largely lived in exile in Europe and the United States, returning to South Africa only for brief periods of time. He lived for a while in New York City, playing with the band of Duke Ellington and learning composition at the Juilliard School of Music. As the Black Power movement developed in the 1960s and 1970s, it influenced a number of Ibrahim's friends and collaborators, who began to see their music as a form of cultural nationalism. Ibrahim in turn began to incorporate African elements into his jazz.

== Recording and production ==
The piece was created while the apartheid government of South Africa was forcibly removing Coloured families from their homes as part of the destruction of District Six; this destruction of a neighbourhood that was "a symbol of resilience and creativity in the face of racial oppression" influenced Ibrahim's music. Ibrahim met Rashid Vally at the latter's Johannesburg record shop, Kohinoor, in the early 1970s. Vally produced two of Ibrahim's albums in the following years. The pair produced a third album in 1974, titled Underground in Africa, in which Ibrahim abandoned his financially unsuccessful folk-infused jazz of the previous albums.

The new album was instead a fusion of jazz, rock music, and South African popular music; it sold much better than Ibrahim's previously collaborations with Vally. While recording Underground, Ibrahim collaborated with Oswietie, a local band of which Robbie Jansen and Basil Coetzee were saxophonists, and who played a large role in creating the album's fusion style. After the success of Underground, Ibrahim asked Coetzee to bring together a supporting band for his next recording: the group Coetzee put together included Jansen, as well as others who had not worked on Underground.

"Mannenberg" was recorded in June 1974 during one of Ibrahim's visits to South Africa, in a studio in Cape Town, and was produced by Rashid Vally on his new label As-Shams (the name suggested by Ibrahim, meaning in Arabic "The Sun"). The track was recorded after Ibrahim began improvising at the piano, and gradually asked the rest of the band to join in; although Ibrahim made suggestions about the melody, the piece also contained collective improvisation. The piece was made after a few days of recording previously composed music; it was recorded quickly — Ibrahim recalled in 2014 that it took only one take.

Asked in an interview how the title came about, he said: "Because Basil was from Manenberg and for us Manenberg was just symbolic of the removal out of District Six, which is actually the removal of everybody from everywhere in the world, and Manenberg specifically because ... it signifies, it's our music, and it's our culture ..." The township of Manenberg was considered symbolic with respect to apartheid in the same way as Soweto.

The track was released on the album Mannenberg – Is Where It's Happening in the same year. The album only featured two songs; "Mannenberg", and "The Pilgrim" (which was similarly long, at 12 minutes and 47 seconds). The title "Mrs. Williams from Mannenberg", in reference to Gladys Williams, former housekeeper of one of the musicians, Morris Goldberg, was also considered for the album, and a photograph of her by Ibrahim was used on the album cover.

== Musical themes ==
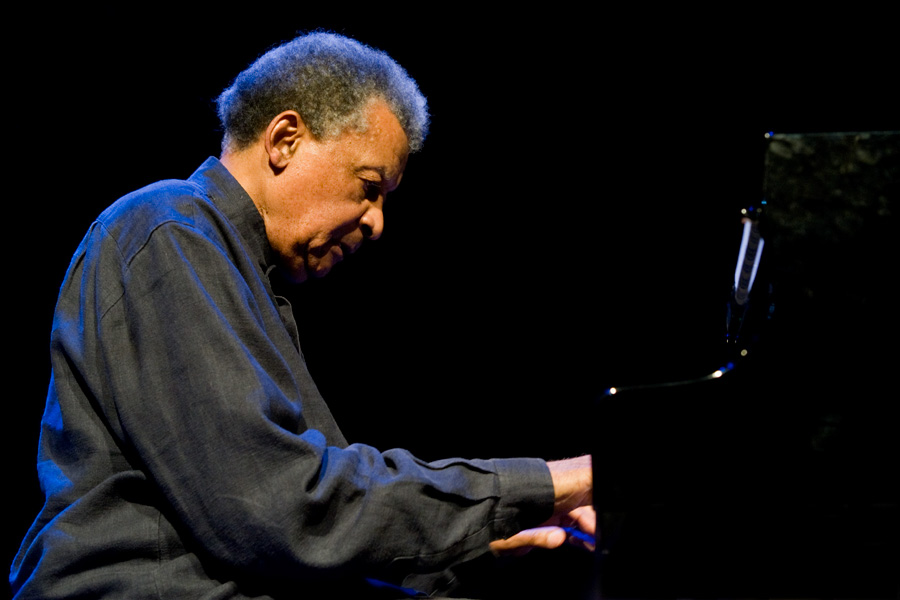
Jazz pianist Abdullah Ibrahim (pictured here in 2011)

"Mannenberg" has a "lilting melody" with a "gentle, hypnotic groove". The song has been described as an example of the use of purely musical techniques to convey subversive messages. The piece has no lyrics, but drew on a number of aspects of Black South African culture, including church music, jazz, marabi, and blues, to create a piece that conveyed a sense of freedom and cultural identity. It includes a saxophone solo by Coetzee, whose role in the song earned him his nickname "Manenberg". During the recording, the piano played by Ibrahim had thumbtacks attached to the hammers; the instrument thus had a "metallic timbre" that was generally associated with marabi music.

Jazz pianist Moses Molelekwa would later state that "Mannenberg" was "a dance song, a party song [like] most of the jazz that was coming out at that period." Commentator John Edwin Mason would write that, "It had an irresistible hook—its beautiful melody. It was driven by an infectious, danceable beat." The popularity of the piece was also attributed to the fact that it contained elements of many musical styles, thus sounding familiar to a large number of listeners: the groove of the piece incorporated elements of marabi, the beat was similar to that of ticky-draai, and the saxophone melody drew from langarm, while all of it was based on an "underlying aesthetic" of jazz. The piece also had similarities to "Jackpot", a 1960 mbaqanga tune by Zacks Nkosi, who believed that "Mannenberg" was a rip-off of his piece. The various African genres that were incorporated into the song came from the Coloured and the Black communities of the country. Ibrahim stated that to the musicians the piece was an "affirmation ... that our inherent culture is valid."

== Reception and impact ==
Vally began to play "Mannenberg" from loudspeakers outside his store even before the album was released, and sold 5,000 copies of the recording in its first week on sale. The piece became wildly popular, and the LP sold more copies in two years than any previous jazz LP recorded in the country, and it cemented Ibrahim's status as South Africa's most popular jazz musician. The piece itself has been described as the "most iconic of all South African jazz tunes", and its release has been identified as the moment at which the genre of Cape jazz became well-known, though it was not the first piece in this genre.

Vally did not have the financial ability to sell the album across the country, and so signed a deal with Gallo Records, the biggest South African record company at the time. Some 43,000 copies were sold in the first seven months; for comparison, an album selling 20,000 copies was considered a hit. The popularity of Coetzee and Jansen increased with that of "Mannenberg", and they became sought-after musicians in Cape Town nightclubs.

A few months after the release of "Mannenberg", South African police fired upon protesting children during the June 1976 Soweto Uprising. That event led Ibrahim and Benjamin to publicly express support for the African National Congress, which was still banned at the time.

"Mannenberg" soon became identified with the movement against apartheid in the 1980s, partly due to Coetzee and Jansen playing the piece at a number of protests and rallies against the apartheid government. Jansen would accompany many of these performances with speeches about being proud of one's own culture, and of "rising up" to challenge apartheid. Fragments of the piece were used as the tune for lyrics that expressed anger and resistance to the apartheid government. It was variously described as the "most powerful anthem of the struggle in the 1980s", the "unofficial national anthem" of South Africa, and "a beloved anthem of hope and resistance for many South Africans".

"Mannenberg" reportedly inspired anti-apartheid leader Nelson Mandela with hope during his imprisonment. Years later, Abdullah Ibrahim recalled that in 1980 the record was smuggled by a lawyer into the Robben Island prison where Mandela was locked up, because music was banned there. It was taken into the control room and played over the prison's loudspeakers. According to Ibrahim, after hearing the piece, Mandela remarked, "Liberation is near".

== Legacy and memorial ==
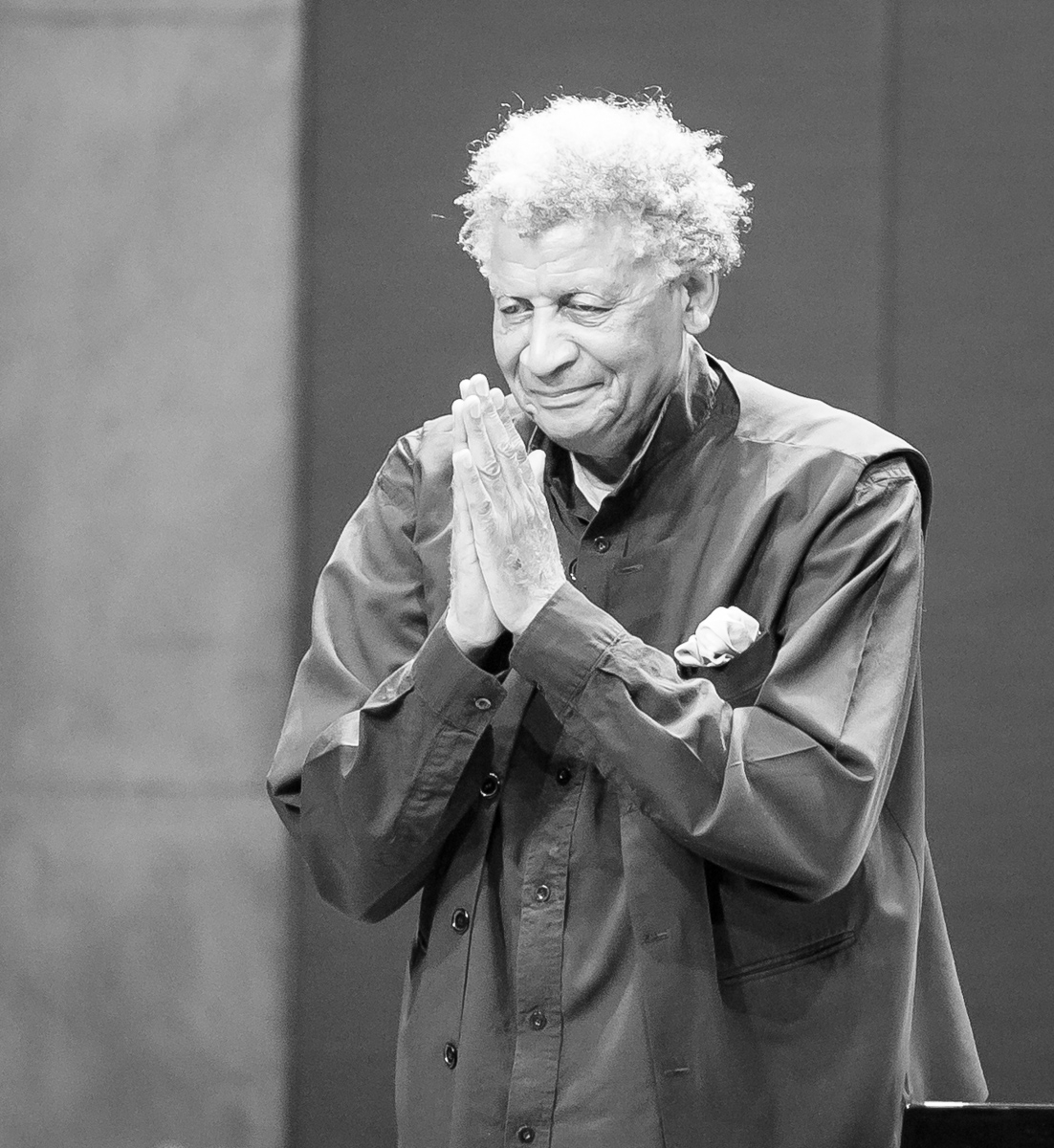
Abdullah Ibrahim at the Oslo Jazz Festival in 2016

Writing in 2014, on the 40th anniversary of the album's release, Lindsay Johns praised "Mannenberg" in The Spectator, saying that the song was "threnodic, passionate and ethereally beautiful." He went on to state that while "Mannenberg" was specifically about the forced relocation of Coloured people to the Cape Flats, it had also given a voice to poor, oppressed, and marginalized communities across the world. Thus, according to Johns, "Mannenberg" shared with other great music the characteristic of being "both specific and universal". He added:

Today, it is still a beloved anthem of hope, resistance and resilience and a celebration of human dignity in the face of brutality and evil. We can also hear in those entrancing chords and ebullient Cape jazz rhythms a life-affirming joy and the desire to survive against all odds. Nowadays, the township of Manenberg may be synonymous with poverty, crime and violence, but Mannenberg the album stands as a musical monument to both a sublime jazz genius and the intrinsic nobility and grandeur of the human spirit.

The place where "Mannenberg" was recorded is commemorated with an abstract sculpture of seven stainless-steel pipes, mounted outside Milestone Studios at 21 Bloem Street in central Cape Town, the building where the original studios were. Designed by electrical engineer Mark O'Donovan and performer Francois Venter, the pipes have been tuned to correspond to the first seven notes of the melody, and are inscribed with the instruction: "Run a stick along these pipes to hear Mannenberg".

"Mannenberg" was played at Zohran Mamdani's inauguration as mayor of New York City in January 2026.

== Personnel ==
Credits adapted from AllMusic.

- Dollar Brand (Abdullah Ibrahim) – piano
- Basil Coetzee – tenor saxophone, flute
- Robbie Jansen – alto saxophone
- Monty Weber – drums
- Morris Goldberg – alto saxophone

== Other versions ==
When the album was first released in the United States its name was changed to Cape Town Fringe. The recording was released as a CD in 1988 by Bellaphon Records. A shorter version of the song, "Mannenberg (Revisited)", appears on Ibrahim's album Water from an Ancient Well, released in 1986. The Mannenberg sessions were subsequently released on his Voice of Africa album in 1989, and the shorter version was included as a track on the album The Mountain in the same year. It was collected on the 2002 release The Best of Abdullah Ibrahim, as well as on the 2005 collection Abdullah Ibrahim: A Celebration, in honour of his 70th birthday.

The album African Tributes by Darius Brubeck & the Nu Jazz Connection features Ibrahim's "Mannenberg/The Wedding" as track 4. The piece was also included in the collections Smooth Africa (2000) and Essential South African Jazz (2007), both of which featured various musicians. "Mannenberg" was the first track on guitarist Ernest Ranglin's 2012 album Avila, which received a five-star rating from AllMusic. "Mannenberg" was also on the soundtrack of Lee Hirsch's 2002 documentary film Amandla!: A Revolution in Four-Part Harmony, which examined the movement against apartheid through the music of the period.

== Sources ==
- Mason, John Edwin (Fall 2007). "'Mannenberg': Notes on the Making of an Icon and Anthem" (PDF). African Studies Quarterly. 9 (4).
- Mojapelo, Max (2009). Beyond Memory. African Minds. ISBN 978-1-920299-28-6.
- Muller, Carol (2004). South African Music : A Century of Traditions in Transformation. ABC-CLIO. ISBN 978-1-57607-276-9.
