= Rashid Vally =

South African music producer and record shop owner

Rashid Vally was a South African music producer and record shop owner. He ran a record shop in downtown Johannesburg, and produced langarm and jazz music. He had a successful collaboration with pianist Abdullah Ibrahim, including the production of "Mannenberg" (1974), a piece which became associated with the movement against apartheid. Scholar Gwen Ansell described his As Shams label as giving "a voice to modern jazz" in 1980s South Africa.

== Personal life ==
Vally was a Muslim of Indian descent. In an interview, Vally said that he began selling music in his father's shop, which was primarily a grocery store but also sold records. In his words, he had "started in the record business" by the time he left school in 1957. He was described as an "easy-going" and "genial" man, and as a "real treasure trunk overflowing with jazz records." He had a passion for jazz, and had built friendships with a number of musicians. In 1983 he was described as being "forty-something" years old.

Vally ran a record shop named "Kohinoor" in downtown Johannesburg, which had a reputation as a hangout for enthusiasts of jazz, and as one of the few public places where people of different racial background could socialize. The store was owned by his family, and most of its customers were either residents of the townships or migrant workers travelling to the reserves. In addition to music, the shop also sold general supplies, including stoves, blankets, and radios.

== Career as producer ==
Vally also produced music as an independent producer, and had recorded langarm music for South Africa's coloured market. He stated that he began by recording South African coloured dance bands, and moved over time to recording jazz. He ran multiple independent labels at different points in time; in 1973 he released a recording on the label "Mandla", and had a new label by 1974 called "As Shams" or "The Sun". Scholar Gwen Answell described the studio as playing a significant role in South African jazz in the 1980s, writing that it "continued to give a voice to modern jazz". Scholar Denis-Constant Martin also described him as being responsible for bringing Dollar Brand, as Abdullah Ibrahim was known prior to his conversion, back to South Africa, as well as contributing significantly to the distribution of black South African music during the apartheid era.

=== Collaboration with Abdullah Ibrahim ===
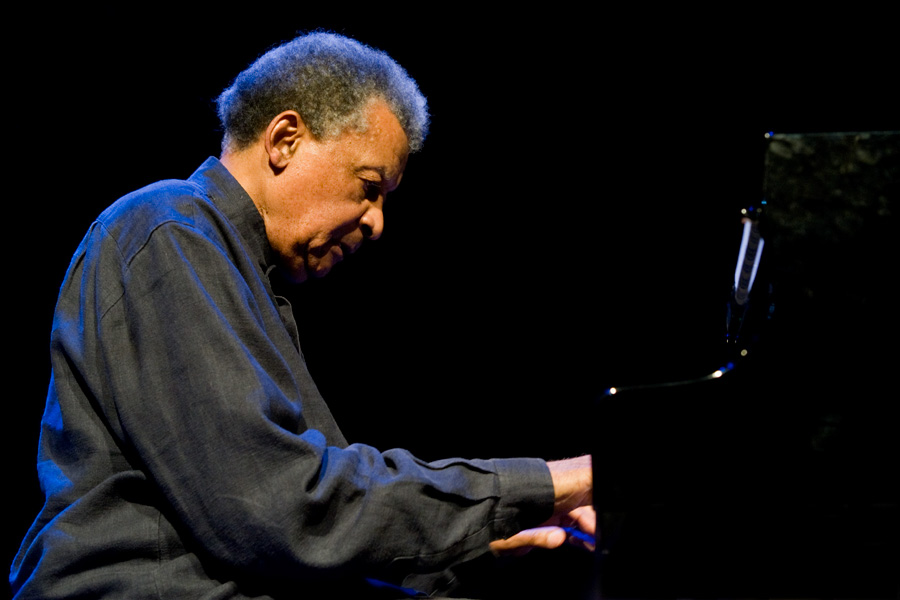
Abdullah Ibrahim in 2011

Vally had a long and successful collaboration with the musician Abdullah Ibrahim, which began in the early 1970s. Scholar George Mason states, based on interviews with Vally, that Ibrahim walked into Vally's record shop and asked Vally to record for him, while Martin writes that it was Vally who asked Ibrahim to record music on his label. Vally himself said in an interview that he asked to record Ibrahim after hearing him play with the Jazz Epistles. Ibrahim knew Vally by reputation, while Vally had followed Ibrahim's career since the 1950s. Vally produced two albums of Ibrahim's in 1971. They did not sell particularly well, but Vally recovered his costs on both. A third collaboration in 1974 titled Underground in Africa proved more successful, and brought critical attention to Ibrahim.

Following the success of this album, Ibrahim began to prepare for another recording session, and asked Vally to support the recording financially. Vally hired engineers and musicians and rented a studio, going deeply into debt in the process. The musicians recorded for several days using Ibrahim's scores; little of this material was eventually released. A few days into the session Ibrahim set aside his scores and began improvising at the piano, and asked the other musicians to join in. Ibrahim suggested the title "Mrs. Williams from Mannenberg" for the resulting piece, but Vally chose to market the song simply as "Mannenberg".

Vally played the piece from loudspeakers outside his Johannesburg studio even before the LP had been released: hearing it, people entered the store and asked what he was playing. The LP sold 5000 copies in its first week, an unusually high number for a South African jazz record. Vally later said that he asked several larger companies for financial support for marketing the record, but was turned down because the companies felt he was asking for too much money for a South African group. Vally instead marketed it himself, and the record became immensely popular. Vally made a deal with Gallo Records to market the album, in the belief that he did not have the "financial muscle" for the job, and the album sold 43,000 copies in the next seven months. The piece raised Ibrahim's profile, and became associated with the movement against apartheid.

== Sources ==
- Ansell, Gwen (2005). Soweto Blues: Jazz, Popular Music, and Politics in South Africa. A&C Black. ISBN 978-0-8264-1753-4.
- Martin, Denis (2013). Sounding the Cape: Music, Identity and Politics in South Africa. African Minds. ISBN 978-1-920489-82-3.
- Mason, John Edwin (Fall 2007). "'Mannenberg': Notes on the Making of an Icon and Anthem" (PDF). African Studies Quarterly. 9 (4).
