= Lionel Bastos =

Mozambican musician

Leonel Levy Lopes Bastos, better known as Lionel Bastos, was born on 16 August 1956 in Maputo, Mozambique) and is a singer, songwriter, and music producer who works mainly in South Africa.

In the 1990s he was part of a band called Be Like Water, who had a radio hit called Don't Go On in 1996. The band split up but did play reunion gigs in 2013.

He has released five solo albums all of which were nominated for South African Music Awards ("SAMAs"). His second album, Simple, won Best Adult Contemporary Album in 1999.

Bastos' third album, Rising Above The Madness, was released in 2001. Both the album and one of its songs, "Thank You," reached the Number 1 spot on the charts in June 2001, the song for two consecutive weeks.

In May 2010, Bastos and radio host Doug Anderson organized a concert at which a number of notable South African artists (incl. Farryl Purkiss, Merseystate, and Wendy Oldfield) performed to benefit victims of the 2010 Haiti earthquake, at the Baxter Concert Hall in Cape Town.

In November 2015, he released his sixth album, Songs From My Phone. The whole album is mastered directly from voice notes recorded on the iPhone's standard voice recorder, in what is believed to be a world first.
