= Cape jazz =

Genre of jazz that is performed in southern Africa

- Stylistic origins: Jazz; South African folk music
- Cultural origins: Late 1950s, Cape Town, South Africa
- Typical instruments: Brass instruments; banjo; guitar; percussion

Regional scenes
- Cape Town

Other topics
- Marabi; South African jazz

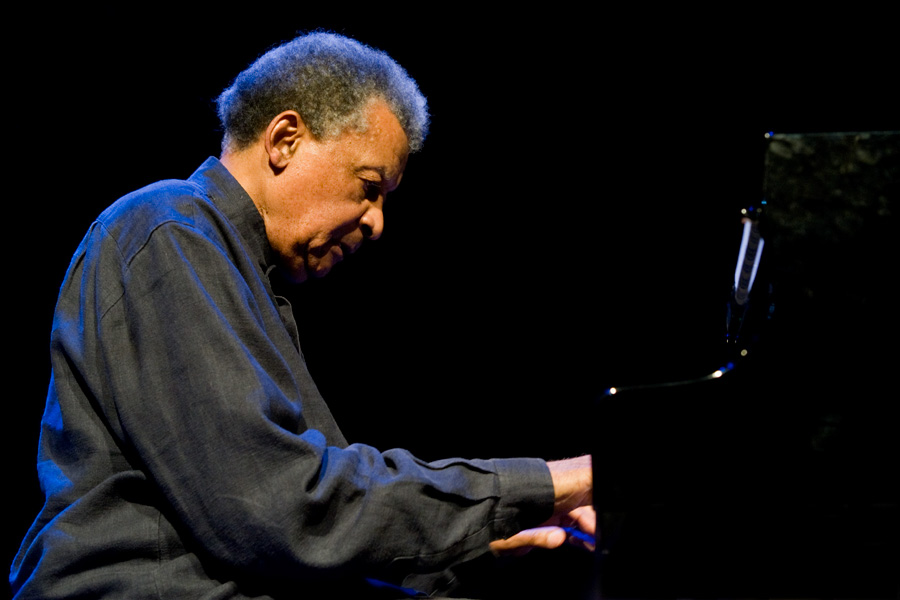
Abdullah Ibrahim (aka Dollar Brand) at the Moers Festival, 2011

Cape jazz is a genre of jazz that is performed in the very southern part of Africa, the name being a reference to Cape Town, South Africa. Some writers say that Cape jazz began to emerge in 1959 with the formation of The Jazz Epistles, many of whom were from Cape Town, including Abdullah Ibrahim, then known as Dollar Brand. Cape jazz is similar to the popular music style known as marabi, though more improvisational in character. Where marabi is a piano jazz style, Cape jazz in the beginning featured (though not exclusively) instruments that can be carried in a street parade, such as brass instruments, banjos, guitars and percussion instruments.

== History ==
Although there are strong influences from the American jazz, the development of Cape jazz ran in a similar way to the course of American jazz but in the early 20th century. Being born in a similar political climate to that in New Orleans, Louisiana, at the end of the 19th century, the blues songs that inspired this genre told of local occurrences in Cape Town. An example is the inspiration of the visits of the southern confederate raider CSS Alabama to the Cape in 1863 and 1864, resulting in the folk song "Daar kom die Alibama".

The leading exponents of this style of music in the 1970s are pianist Abdullah Ibrahim (then known as Dollar Brand) and saxophonists Basil Coetzee and Robbie Jansen. These three, together with bassist Paul Michaels, drummer the late Monty Weber and sax man Morris Goldberg, recorded the seminal Cape jazz song "Mannenberg". Composed by Brand/Ibrahim, the song takes its name from the notoriously crime-ridden creole working-class township on the Cape Flats of Cape Town. The township was one of several created by the apartheid regime following the clearing of the urban slum quarter known as District Six, home to many artists and musicians. Their US American contemporaries in the jazz field were taking on board rock and funk influences. Brand and his group were still being influenced by the more ethnic blues music.

Like the comparable music of New Orleans, Cape jazz was mainly inspired by the blues and folk songs sung by creole people descended from the former slave communities living in the Western Cape, known loosely as the Cape Coloured or Cape Malay people. A street carnival parade or Mardi Gras (also called the Coon Carnival) is held each year peaking on 2 January. This event is the culmination of months of musical and dance rehearsal and community-based competitions, by various mostly mixed-race folk, and was known as Tweede Nuwe Jaar (Afrikaans). The performers, known as Klopse, borrowed the painted faces and bright consumes of the minstrel show style of New Orleans and combined this with African and European music that was to be heard in the taverns and night clubs of the port city.

Some of this music is also more recently known as Goema, or Ghoema jazz (also written "guma" – Jonas Gwangwa), referring to a particular wooden barrel-shaped Asian-style drum (also known in the Cape as a Ghomma) played by the revelers in the almost totally creole troupes in the aforementioned parade.

There is a new generation of Cape jazz musicians of which the band called The Goema Captains are a good example. The group featured Mac McKenzie, Alex van Heerden and Hilton Schilder, who have brought greater improvisational elements to this music. They have literally re-arranged Cape traditional songs and jazzed them up. The young Van Heerden was killed in a motor accident in 2009, but not before releasing two very modern albums of his own, inspired by this genre and his time spent under Robbie Jansen's teaching. Another example is The Cape Jazz Band, an all-star ensemble drawing its players from different groups performing in Cape Town. Other leading names in the genre are pianist Tony Schilder, guitarist Errol Dyers, bass player and composer Stephen Erasmus and the Gugulethu-based saxophonist the late Winston Mankunku.

The first commercial reference to Cape jazz in South African music is on the record label compilation of Mountain Records artists released in 1993. The album collected the work of several of the label's acts over a 12-year period beginning in 1981. The thematic similarity in the instrumental compositions, all of which are original, very clearly illustrates this genre. The album contained another Cape Jazz gem in the Jonathan Butler track "7th Avenue". The compilation was the inspiration for the collation and publication of a sheet music collection of Cape Jazz composers (see below).

In September 2006, the Cape Town Jazz Orchestra was launched with a concert promoted by the Arts and Culture department of the South African government. This project brought together 16 musicians from all over South Africa to perform arrangements of works by different jazz composers including Abdullah Ibrahim, who also performed at the concert, and a piece dedicated to and inspired by the late Basil Coetzee. Since the launch, the orchestra has changed from being one with performers from the whole of South Africa to a collection of Cape-based players. From 2008 they became known as the Cape Jazz Orchestra under the musical leadership of Alvin Dyers. This should not be confused with The Cape Jazz Band, a group under the leadership of jazz drummer Jack Momple, who contributed to many of the most famous Cape jazz recordings.

An international breakthrough for the genre came when a compilation of recordings entitled Cape Jazz 3 - Goema entered the prestige European World Music Charts in May 2008. Until this point this music was seen as jazz, although many songs performed by the exponents are jazzed-up folk music standards from the Cape and thus justify being considered as "world music". The album contains work from Robbie Jansen, Dollar Brand, Chris McGregor, Basil Coetzee, Errol Dyers and others.

In 2010 the aforementioned Mac McKenzie composed and scored his orchestral piece entitled "Goema Symphony number 1", a Cape jazz-inspired piece that was given its debut with a full orchestra in Cape Town in 2011.

A new name in the genre is the young pianist Kyle Shepherd, a student of the late Robbie Jansen and past member of Jack Momple's ensemble, who issued three solo albums with very strong roots material in 2008, 2010 and 2012.

Momple's own ensemble, the Cape Jazz Band (CJB), got together in 2013 to make a new album of purely Cape jazz songs composed by him and his band members, entitled Musical Democracy. Since then in 2018 a collection of Cape Town-based pianists have come together to perform some of the classics of the genre under the title of Cape Jazz Piano. Among those names on the credits are Ibrahim Khalil Shihab (Chris Schilder), Ramon Alexander, Mike Perry, Kyle Shepherd, Hilton Schilder and Mervyn Africa.

== Sheet music collection ==
In 2008 music researcher Colin Miller together with publisher Nick Green of jazz.co.za, released the first ever sheet music collection of Cape jazz compositions arranged by Jannie van Tonder, entitled the Cape Jazz Collection. The tunes included in this anthology are a modest part of the large body of music composed by some of Cape Town's premier jazz musicians. These include Winston Mankunku Ngozi, Merton Barrow, Basil Coetzee and Robbie Jansen who, among others, are household names in South African jazz. Though the genre existed long before official Apartheid, it has become a popular belief that these musicians provided anthems of resistance, challenged the Apartheid State through cultural activism and kept their fans dancing through the 1980s towards electoral freedom in the early 1990s.

Post-1994 saw the emergence of younger musicians, equally dedicated to the promotion of local music. Due to a new political dispensation, they had increased opportunities for professionalism in music. Among these are Paul Hanmer, Mark Fransman and Buddy Wells, whose compositions are also included in the Cape Jazz Collection.

== See also ==
- Kaapse Klopse
- Coon song
- Minstrel Show
- Dissertation on Kaapse Klopse -
- Page 388 - Kippie to Kippies by Sam Mathe
