= Gomma =

Gomma may refer to:

- Kingdom of Gomma, a kingdom (c. 1780–1886) in Ethiopia
- Gomma (woreda), an administrative division in Oromia Region, Ethiopia
- Goema, also spelled Gomma, a South African hand drum
- A feature of ALGOL 68 allowing collateral execution of code
