= Fruitbats & Crows =

Studio album by Farryl Purkiss
- Released: 5 October 2009
- Recorded: 2008–2009
- Genre: Singer-songwriter, pop rock, folk rock
- Length: 46:30
- Label: 2Feet, Sheer Sound
- Producer: Brian O'Shea

Farryl Purkiss chronology
Farryl Purkiss (2006)	Fruitbats & Crows (2009)

Singles from Fruitbats & Crows
- 1. "A Million Grains of Sand" Released: 7 September 2009

Fruitbats & Crows is the follow-up to Farryl Purkiss's 2006 self-titled album. In the three years between albums, Purkiss had toured Australia three times, Europe, United States and South Africa. His songs have been used in campaigns by Nissan (Greece), Audi (UK), MTN (South Africa) as well as placement in the film "Adopted" (featuring Pauly Shore). In 2007 he was voted the most popular musician by Heat Magazine (South Africa)

This album was produced by Brian O'Shea. The album contains 12 new tracks and features international guest musicians such as Ash Grunwald (Australia) and John Ellis (Tree 63).

The album was mixed and engineered by Brent Quinton (except for "Man of Alibi", engineered by Earl Large and co-engineered by Brent Quinton). The album was mastered by Rogan Kelsey.

== Track listing ==
All tracks are written by Farryl Purkiss.

No.	Title	Length
1.	"Man of Alibi"	4:39
2.	"Seraphine"	3:47
3.	"Kissing Devils on the Cheek"	4:10
4.	"A Million Grains of Sand"	3:44
5.	"Creeping Up on Me"	3:45
6.	"Monkeys' Wedding"	4:09
7.	"Let It Be"	3:26
8.	"Pennies in the Snow"	2:43
9.	"Long December"	4:45
10.	"No One Left To Blame"	4:32
11.	"Bleed"	3:36
12.	"Tide"	3:25

== Singles ==
The first single produced from the album was "A Million Grains of Sand". The music video peaked at No. 4 on South African music channel, MK.

== Musicians ==
- Farryl Purkiss – vocals, acoustic guitar
- Kieran Smith – bass guitar
- Brent Quinton – bass guitar, electric guitar
- Gareth Gale – drums
- Ross Campbell – drums
- Ash Grunwald – slide guitar ("Man of Alibi")
- John Ellis – electric guitar ("Kissing Devils on the Cheek", "A Million Grains of Sand", "Creeping Up on Me", "Let It Be")
- Candice Nel – backing vocals ("Kissing Devils on the Cheek", "Monkeys' Wedding")
- Damon Forbes – backing vocals ("Kissing Devils on the Cheek")
- Burton Naidoo – keyboards
- Guy Buttery – acoustic guitar ("Monkeys' Wedding", "No One Left To Blame")
- Sanjeet Teeluck – Harmonium ("Bleed")

== Reception ==
Professional ratings
Review scores
Source	Rating
iAfrica.com	4/4 stars
The Citizen	7.5/10 stars
FHM	5/5 stars
Heat Magazine	5/5 stars
Muse Magazine	4/5 stars
High-Flyers Magazine	(favourable)
You Magazine	4/4 stars

== Release history ==
Country	Release date
South Africa	5 October 2009
