= More than Friends =

More than Friends may refer to:

- "More than Friends" (Inna song), 2013
- "More than Friends" (James Hype song), 2017
- "More than Friends" (Jason Mraz song), 2018
- "More than Friends", a 2008 song by Estelle from Shine
- "More than Friends", a 2014 song by Victoria Duffield
- More Than Friends (album), a 1988 album by Jonathan Butler
- More Than Friends (1978 film), broadcast on American TV
- More Than Friends (TV series), a 2020 South Korean television series
