= Jonathan Butler =

South African singer-songwriter and guitarist

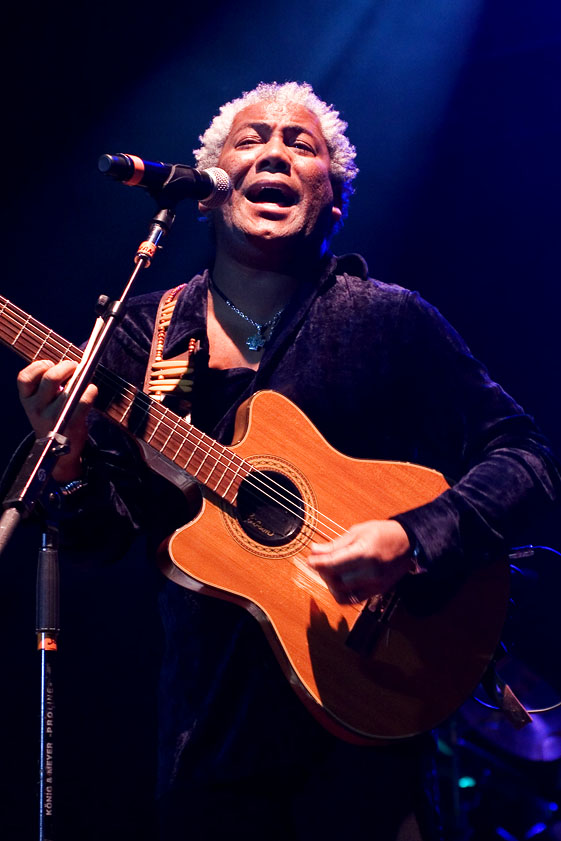
- Jonathan Butler in 2007

Background information
- Born: Jonathan Kenneth Butler; 10 October 1961 (age 65); Athlone, Cape Town, South Africa
- Genres: Rhythm and blues, jazz fusion, contemporary worship music
- Occupations: Musician, songwriter
- Instruments: Vocals, guitar
- Years active: 1975–present
- Labels: Artistry, Mountain, Jive, Rendezvous
- Website: www.jonathanbutler.com

Jonathan Kenneth Butler (born 10 October 1961) is a South African singer-songwriter and guitarist. His music is often classified as R&B, jazz fusion or worship music.

== Biography ==
Born and raised in Athlone, Cape Town, South Africa, during apartheid, Butler started singing and playing acoustic guitar as a child. Racial segregation and poverty during apartheid has been the subject of many of his records. Classified as a Coloured man under the Apartheid classification system, his first single was the first song by an artist of color to be played by white radio stations in the racially segregated South Africa and earned a Sarie Award, South Africa's equivalent to the Grammy Awards.

He began touring at the age of seven when he joined a travelling stage show, and was later signed up to perform on a string of hit recordings, turning him into a local teen idol. In 1975, his cover of "Please Stay" by the Drifters reached number 2 in South Africa. The same year his cover of "I Love How You Love Me" by The Paris Sisters reached number 4. "I'll Be Home" reached number 16 in 1976.

In 1978, he found the inspiration and encouragement to begin expressing himself as a composer and songwriter when he joined Cape Town's best known jazz/rock outfit, the Pacific Express. Two albums were recorded with the Express personnel, and some Pacific Express songs were later released on the 1988 7th Avenue album. All three releases were issued by Mountain Records.

Butler was signed to CCP Records, a predecessor to Jive Records in 1977. He left the label to join Mountain Records after a few years. The manager of Mountain Records, Paddy Lee-Thorp was also Butler's manager and in the early 1980s they signed Jonathan to Jive Records and he moved to the United Kingdom, where he remained for seventeen years. His international breakthrough came in 1987 with his Grammy-nominated hit single, "Lies" which reached No. 27 on Billboard's Hot 100 chart, and his cover version of the Staple Singers song "If You're Ready (Come Go with Me)" which he performed with Ruby Turner. His single "Lies", also reached the UK Official Singles Chart, peaking at number 18, spending 12 weeks, in total, in the top 100.

In 2001, Butler was featured in a compilation album that was a jazz tribute to Bob Marley produced by Lee Ritenour, A Twist of Marley. Butler's contribution to the album was a jazz cover of No Woman No Cry.

Butler maintained a loyal following in the 1980s and 1990s, in South Africa, the United States and Europe.

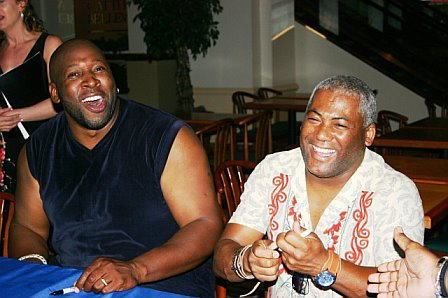
Wayman Tisdale & Jonathan Butler CD release party at the AllStar Rendezvous Concert in 2006.

In 2006, Butler was a featured vocalist on the album Gospel Goes Classical, produced by University of Alabama at Birmingham music professor Henry Panion. This recording, featuring arrangements by Panion, Tommy Stewart, Michael Loveless, and Ray Reach, rose to No. 2 on the Billboard Gospel chart, and No. 3 on the Classical Crossover chart. He was also nominated for a Grammy Award for his single "Going Home".

Also in 2008, Butler guest-starred on George Duke's Album Dukey Treats, alongside the late Teena Marie on the track Sudan, talking about the disasters of Darfur.

From 2005 to 2012 Butler lived in Bell Canyon, California,

On 19 May 2026 Butler received the Order of Ikhamanga in Silver from the South African Department of Sport, Arts and Culture.

== Discography ==
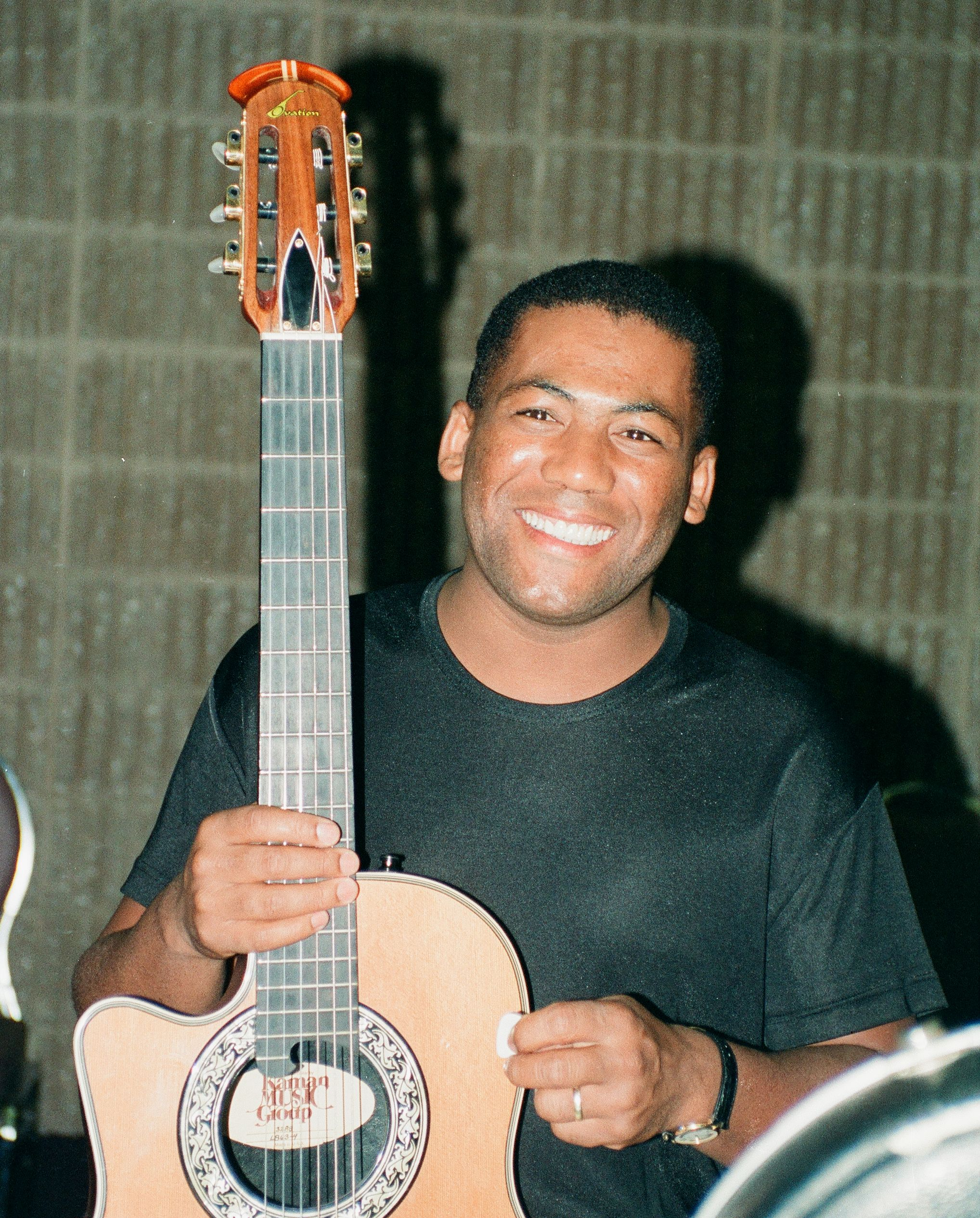
Jonathan Butler in 1996

=== Studio albums ===
Year	Album	Chart positions						Certifications
Year	Album	US	US R&B	US Jazz	US Con. Jazz	US Gospel	UK	Certifications
1975	I Love How You Love Me	—	—	—	—	—	—	
1983	Crossroads	—	—	—	—	—	—	
1985	Introducing Jonathan Butler	101	46	—	—	—	—	
1987	Jonathan Butler	50	13	—	12	—	12	BPI: Gold
1987	Put My Love Away	—	—	—	—	—	—	
1987	Inspirations	—	—	—	—	—	—	
1988	More Than Friends	113	17	—	10	—	29	
1990	Deliverance	—	—	—	—	—	—	
1990	Heal Our Land	—	58	—	2	—	—	
1991	Harmony	—	—	—	5	—	—	
1994	Head to Head	—	32	—	—	—	—	
1997	Do You Love Me?	—	57	4	3	—	—	
1999	Story of Life	—	—	9	6	—	—	
2000	The Source	—	—	14	11	—	—	
2002	Surrender	—	—	10	9	—	—	
2004	The Worship Project	—	—	—	—	16	—	
2005	Gospel Days	—	—	—	—	—	—	
2005	Jonathan	—	84	8	5	10	—	
2006	Gospel Goes Classical (with Juanita Bynum)	146	—	—	—	2	—	
2007	Brand New Day	—	—	—	—	6	—	
2010	So Strong	—	—	7	2	—	—	
2012	Grace and Mercy	—	—	1	1	9	—	
2013	Merry Christmas to You	—	—	9	2	12	—	
2014	Living My Dream	—	—	3	1	—	—	
2015	Free	—	—	5	1	13	—	
2018	Close to You	—	—	4	2	—	—	
2019	Christmas Together	—	—	3	2	—	—	
2023	Ubuntu	—	—	-	-	—	—	
"—" denotes releases that did not chart or were not released in that territory.

=== Live albums ===
- Live in South Africa (2007)

=== Compilation albums ===
- Best of Jonathan Butler (1993)
- Ultimate Butler (2002)
- Christmas Goes Gospel: Tis the Season (2014)
- Divine Voices: Pastors of Praise (2015)

=== Collaborations ===
- Dave Grusin Presents West Side Story (1997) (Featured soloist - Maria)

=== Singles ===
Year	Single	Peak chart positions			
Year	Single	US	US R&B	US A/C	UK
1975	"Please Stay"	—	—	—	―
1975	"I Love How You Love Me"	―	—	―	―
1976	"Fundamental Reggae"	―	―	—	―
1976	"I'll Be Home"	―	—	―	—
1984	"I'll Be Waiting for Your Love"	―	―	―	—
1986	"If You're Ready (Come Go with Me)" (with Ruby Turner)	―	58	―	30
1986	"Haunted by Your Love"	―	—	―	—
1986	"Baby Please Don't Take It (I Need Your Love)"	—	—	25	―
1987	"Lies"	27	5	16	18
1987	"Holding On"	―	22	―	92
1987	"(You're) the Girl of My Dreams"	―	—	―	―
1987	"Overflowing"	―	―	―	—
1987	"Take Good Care of Me"	―	10	24	89
1988	"True Love Never Fails"	―	—	—	―
1988	"More than Friends"	―	4	48	―
1988	"Sarah, Sarah"	―	7	—	―
1988	"There's One Born Every Minute (I'm a Sucker for You)"	―	9	―	―
1989	"It's So Hard to Let You Go"	―	—	―	―
1990	"Heal Our Land"	―	45	―	—
1990	"Sing Me Your Love Song"	―	66	―	―
1990	"Welcome Home"	―	―	―	—
1990	"All Grow'd Up"	―	―	―	—
1994	"I'm on My Knees"	―	53	―	―
1995	"Can We Start All Over Again"	―	61	—	―
1998	"Lost to Love"	―	68	―	―
"—" denotes releases that did not chart or were not released in that territory.
