= DJ Qness =

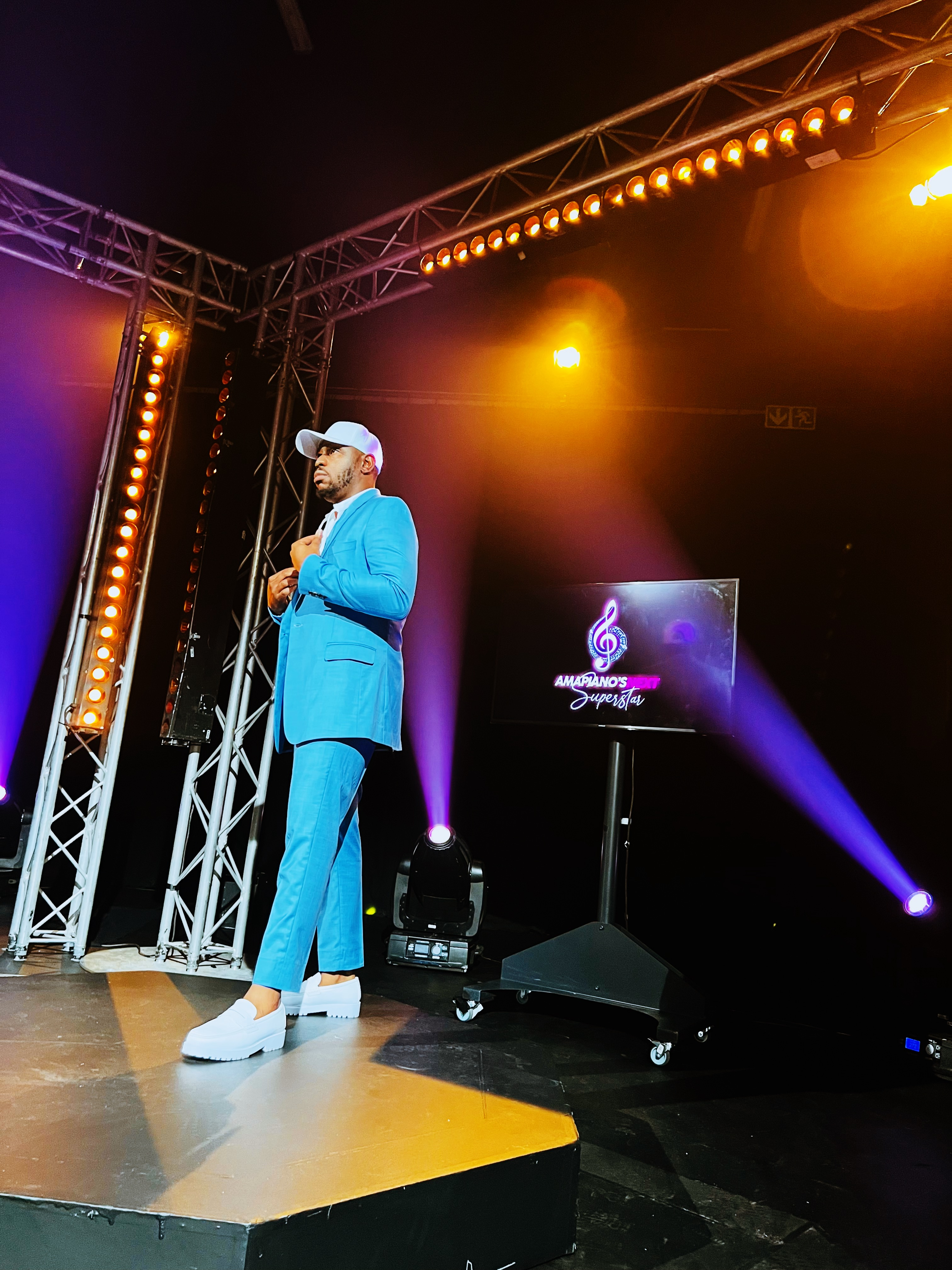
- DJ Qness on set at the Amapiano's Next Superstar TV Show in 2022

Background information
- Also known as: DJ Qness
- Born: Qhubani Ndlovu; 14 September 1983 (age 43); Johannesburg
- Genres: Deep House, Afro House, Melodic House & Techno, Indie Dance, Electronica, Techno
- Occupations: DJ, record producer, entrepreneur, Music Executive, Songwriter, Television Producer
- Years active: 2007–present
- Labels: Moblack Records, Spinnin Records, Elements, Kingstreet Sounds, Nite Grooves, Connected Frontline (Stereo MC’s), Soul Candi, Universal Music, Just Music, Madorasindahouse Records, Exploited, Street King, Because Music, XL Recordings
- Awards, television:SA Amapiano Awards 2021, Amapiano's Next Superstar 2022

Qhubani Ndlovu (born 14 September 1983), also known as DJ Qness, is a South African DJ. He is a Music executive, Songwriter and Television producer.

He put out four studio albums, namely On Cue Vol. 1 (released 2009) - of which he released a deluxe version of the same album and named it, On Cue Reloaded, before releasing his second album On Cue Vol. 2 in 2011, On Cue Vol. 3 which he released in 2013, Art Of EDM (released 2017) and a DJ mix album titled Essential Selections which he released through Dutch label Spinnin Records in collaboration with Just Music SA, which went on to win Best Compilation Album at the 16th Annual Metro FM Awards.

== Biography ==
=== Early life ===
Qness grew up in Palm Springs, Johannesburg in the Vaal. He excelled at school and was also very good at public speaking and debating.

=== Musical career ===
It has been previously reported that Qness can't even remember when he started doing music but he was at it from a very young age.

At age 17, he and his childhood friend drafted a proposal and approached a local bank to secure funds to set up a recording studio. They went to the bank dressed in high school uniforms and carrying school bags, and did a presentation on why they needed the funds. The bank officials were so impressed and the loan was approved the next day.

==== Debut Album ====
On Cue Vol. 1 is the debut studio album by DJ Qness, which was released by Sheer Music in 2009. This album remains one of Qness's most successful albums to date. Shortly after releasing the album, Qness announced that he had originally wanted to work with established acts like Simphiwe Dana and Siphokazi to name just a few, but he was unable to get them because he "lacked the profile" at the time.

Hence what he did was to seek new talent that would challenge the market, but still make the same impact. The result was an album that contributed to giving birth to a new era of vocalists and acts such as Maleh, Oluhle, and Khanyi (of "Set Your Mind Free" fame), who went on to become established successful acts in their own right.

His debut album "On Cue Vol.1" sold over 20 000 units, attaining gold status and featured the hits "Fugama Unamathe" and "Uzongilinda".

==== Other Albums ====
On Cue Vol. 2 is the second studio album by DJ Qness, which was released in 2011 by Universal Music. Like its predecessor it did extremely well on the market and spurned hit singles such as "Time", "Believing", "Imiyalo", and "I Do" just to name a few. Qness also matured in terms of production compared to his first record and also managed to realize his dream of working with acts he had always wanted to work with from the start such as Simphiwe Dana and Zamajobe. The recording sessions for the album predominantly took place at his new home in Ferndale as well as his permanent studio in the Vaal and he recorded the project over a period of two years before finally conceding that it was ready for the market.

On Cue Vol. 3 is the third studio album by DJ Qness. It was released in 2013 by Soul Candi Records and featured collaborations with prominent acts such as Oliver Mtukudzi, Marissa Guzmann, Marie Chan (from Jamali), Kafele Bandele, & Moneoa, to name just a few. The recording sessions for the album took place at the then Soul Candi Pyramid Studios, as well as Qness's studio in the Vaal.

Qness has also done some work with M.I.A. on the song "XXXO", which he remixed along with fellow artist South African DJ and music producer DJ Mujava. The duo also worked on the single "Everything You Wanted" by Kele from Bloc Party, which they did a remix for.

=== Associated acts ===
Qness is associated with acts like Dele Sosimi, Monkey Safari, FNX Omar, Lazarusman, MoBlack, Kele Okereke, Quentin Harris, Kafele Bandele, Oliver Mtukudzi, Simphiwe Dana, Zamajobe, Simi, Maleh, Ami Faku.

=== Television ===
DJ Qness is currently an Executive Producer for the South Africa Amapiano Awards (2021) and Amapiano's Next Superstar (2022).

=== Personal life ===
Qness has a son named Loyiso, the mother to whom they separated before the child was born.

== Discography ==
=== Albums ===
- On Cue Vol. 1
- On Cue Reloaded
- On Cue Vol 2
- On Cue Vol 3

=== On Cue Vol. 1 (Album) ===
==== Tracklisting ====
All songs produced by DJ Qness.

No.	Title	Writer(s)	Length
1.	"Uzongilinda" ((UPZ Mix) ft Malehloka)	Qhubani Ndlovu, Tinashe V. Mushapaidze
2.	"Time" (ft Malehloka)	Qhubani Ndlovu
3.	"Believing" (ft Kafele)	Avi Elman, Kafele Bandele, Qhubani Ndlovu
4.	"Bambelela" (ft Zizipho)	Qhubani Ndlovu, Zizipho Mposula
5.	"Miles Away" ((Pex Africah Remix) ft Vindo Vinchento)	Qhubani Ndlovu, Tinashe V. Mushapaidze
6.	"Fugama Unamathe" ((Aero Manyelo Re Work) ft 'Oluhle)	Qhubani Ndlovu, Sukoluhle Ncube
7.	"Voice of a thousand Africans"	Qhubani Ndlovu, Lucky Shabangu
8.	"DJ Qness's Revenge"	Qhubani Ndlovu, Lucky Shabangu
9.	"Time" ((Club Edit) ft Malehloka)	Qhubani Ndlovu
10.	"Uzongilinda" ((Reprise Mix) ft Malehloka (Bonus Track))	Qhubani Ndlovu, Tinashe V. Mushapaidze

==== Album Reception ====
The album was a resounding success and the lead singles like "Time" and "Believing" went viral and became very popular on radio as well as on the club and party circuit and it served as a pivotal introduction to what was going to be his next project "On Cue Volume 2".

==== Singles ====
- "Fugama Unamathe" (2009)
- "Uzongilinda" (2009)

===== Fugama Unamathe =====
Single by DJ Qness from the album "On Cue Vol. 1"

Released: 2009

Recorded: 2008

Genre: Afro House

Length: 07.43

Label: Sheer Music/ Cue Ness Communications

Writers: Qhubani Ndlovu

Sukoluhle Ncube

Producer(s): Qhubani Ndlovu

Music Video: Fugama Unamathe on YouTube

====== Background ======
Fugama Unamathe was Qness' first single to be released commercially. It is also one of his most successful singles. In 2008 after dropping out of law school Qness was forced to move back to his parents' home South of Johannesburg where he spent countless hours on the computer making music. It was during this time that he created the music for the song that would later be named "Fugama Unamathe". After completing the song he needed vocals and after struggling to get the vocalists he wanted for a feature he advertised on Facebook that he was searching for a vocalist.

The advert was then seen by UK-based Mthulisi Patrick, who was managing UK-based upcoming singer Oluhle at the time, who then responded to the ad requesting Qness to send the music. Qness sent him the music and months later the song "Fugama Unamathe" was born. Thereafter Qness secured a job in the marketing department of Sheer Music where he played the song to DJ QT, who then played it to DJ Mbuso. Mbuso, who was working on his "Phezulu Selections Vol 2 " album at the time, went crazy upon hearing the song and immediately called Qness and requested to license the song for his album.

Qness agreed and Fugama went on to become one of the biggest songs of 2009 in South Africa and immediately launched Qness's career as a DJ & Musical Producer of repute.

====== Writing & Composition ======
The music to the song was created by DJ Qness and the lyrics written by Oluhle, of which she adapted from a traditional ethnic African song which was mostly sung in funerals to try to bring comfort and healing to bereaved mourners.

====== Reception ======
The song was met with very positive reactions and made it to the top charts of many of the country's prominent radio stations including YFM, Metro FM and Ukhozi.

===== Uzongilinda =====
Second radio single from the album "On Cue Vol. 1 by DJ Qness

Released: 2009/2010

Recorded: 2008

Genre: Soulful House

Length: 06.07

Label: Sheer Music/ Cue Ness Communications/Soul Candi Records

Writers: Qhubani Ndlovu

Vincent Tinashe Mushapaidze

Producer(s): Qhubani Ndlovu

Music Video: Uzongilinda/Time on YouTube

Uzongilinda was DJ Qness' second radio single from the album "On Cue Vol 1" and featured Maleh (previously known as Malehloka) on the vocals.

====== Background ======
In 2008 while working as a Copyright Assistant at Sheer Publishing Qness met Maleh who was part of Bloemfontein-based group Kaya at the time. Upon hearing that she was a vocalist, Qness requested to hear her material. The first time he heard her voice was on the song "Bayethe" which she did with Kaya. Qness lamented that he had "never heard such an angelic voice" in his life before. He requested to go into the studio with her and the result was the song "Uzongilinda".

====== Writing & Composition ======
The music was composed by Qness and the lyrics to the song were written by Qness alongside his childhood friend Vincent in Cresta, Johannesburg North, at Qness's then one bedroom apartment. They recorded it at his studio in the Vaal. It was released as a single in 2010 after "Fugama Unamathe" and some people have argued that it is one of the best love songs ever created in the South African house music fraternity.

====== Reception ======
Immediately after release it went on to chart nationwide causing waves on stations such as Ukhozi FM, YFM, & Metro FM, to name just a few. Maleh still credits Qness as having played a pivotal role in helping shape her career to what it is today. The single was later remixed by Israel's UPZ aka Avi Elman, along with Abicah Soul, Rancido from Netherlands, Euan Mitchell from the UK, and upcoming South African producers Sbonza, Mindlo & house music duo Infinite Boys.

=== On Cue Reloaded (Album) ===
On Cue Reloaded was the repackaged deluxe album of DJ Qness's debut "On Cue Vol. 1" album. The album featured remixes from the initial volume one and also introduced some new singles that were going to be later found on his volume 2 album.

==== Background ====
After the success of Volume 1, Qness wanted to release some remixes of some of the hit songs from the album but he didn't know how he would do it and that is how the idea of releasing the "Reloaded" version came up. These remixes had been previously released on digital platforms like Traxsource and Qness wanted them to be available on physical CD since many of the people on his fan base then had no access to acquiring music on digital platforms like Traxsource at the time.

==== Tracklisting ====
All songs produced by DJ Qness.

No.	Title	Writer(s)	Length
1.	"Uzongilinda (UPZ Mix) ft Malehloka"	Qhubani Ndlovu, Tinashe V. Mushapaidze
2.	"Time ft Malehloka"	Qhubani Ndlovu
3.	"Believing ft Kafele"	Avi Elman, Kafele Bandele, Qhubani Ndlovu
4.	"Bambelela ft Zizipho"	Qhubani Ndlovu, Zizipho Mposula
5.	"Miles Away (Pex Africah Remix) ft Vindo Vinchento"	Qhubani Ndlovu, Tinashe V. Mushapaidze
6.	"Fugama Unamathe (Aero Manyelo Re Work) ft 'Oluhle"	Qhubani Ndlovu, Sukoluhle Ncube
7.	"Voice of a thousand Africans"	Qhubani Ndlovu, Lucky Shabangu
8.	"DJ Qness's Revenge"	Qhubani Ndlovu, Lucky Shabangu
9.	"Time (Club Edit) ft Malehloka"	Qhubani Ndlovu
10.	"Uzongilinda (Reprise Mix) ft Malehloka (Bonus Track)"	Qhubani Ndlovu, Tinashe V. Mushapaidze

==== Reception ====
The album was a resounding success and the lead singles like "Time" and "Believing" went viral and became very popular on radio as well as on the club and party circuit and it served as a pivotal introduction to what was going to be his next project "On Cue Volume 2".

=== On Cue Vol. 2 ===
On Cue Vol. 2 is the second studio album by DJ Qness, which was released in 2011 by Universal Music. Like its predecessor it did extremely well on the market and spawned hit singles such as "Time", "Believing" "Imiyalo" and "I do" just to name a few. Qness also matured in terms of production compared to his first record and also managed to realize his dream of working with acts he had always wanted to work with from the start such as Simphiwe Dana & Zamajobe.

The recording sessions for the album predominantly took place at his new home in Ferndale as well as his permanent studio in the Vaal and he recorded the project over a period of two years before finally conceding that it was ready for the market.

==== Tracklisting ====
All tracks produced by DJ Qness (Qhubani Ndlovu), except for "Time", produced by R.B. Mahosana & T.R. Mabogwane, and "Ematholeni", co-produced by S.W. Nhleko.

No.	Title	Writer(s)	Length
1.	"Zandisile" ((DJ Qness Remix) [feat. Simphiwe Dana])	Simphiwe Dana	07.10
2.	"Time" ((Black Motion Remix) [feat. Maleh])	Qhubani Ndlovu	05.45
3.	"Imiyalo" ((DJ Qness Remix))	Nomalungelo Dladla, Muzi Ngwenya	06.08
4.	"Flutes of the Motherland"	Qhubani Ndlovu	04.51
5.	"Come With Me" ((DJ Qness Remix) [feat. Zamajobe])	Zamajobe Sithole	07.10
6.	"Don't Go" ((feat. Xoli M))	Qhubani Ndlovu, Xolile Mazibuko	06.16
7.	"How Do I Say" ((feat. Zizipho))	Qhubani Ndlovu, Zizipho Sithole	06.23
8.	"Ematholeni" ((feat. Spha))	Sphamandla W. Nhleko, Qhubani Ndlovu	05.37
9.	"Believing" ((DJ Qness Remix) [feat. Kafele])	Avi Elman, Kafele Bandele, Qhubani Ndlovu	06.17
10.	"Time" ((feat. Maleh))	Qhubani Ndlovu	05.37
11.	"Bambelela" ((feat. Zizipho))	Qhubani Ndlovu, Zizipho Sithole	06.54
12.	"Khushu Khushu" ((DJ Qness Remix) [feat. Fundile Mdingi])	Fundile Mdingi	06.39
13.	"I Do" ((feat. Simi))	Simi Ogunleye, Qhubani Ndlovu	04.06

==== Singles ====
- "Time" (2010)
- "Believing (DJ Qness Remix)" (2011)
- "I Do" (2011)
- "Imiyalo" (2012),

===== Time =====
Single by DJ Qness from the albums "On Cue Reloaded" & "On Cue Vol. 2"

Released: 2010/2011

Recorded: 2010

Genre: Soulful House

Length: 06.19

Label: Universal Music/ Cue Ness Communications

Writers: Qhubani Ndlovu

Producer(s): Qhubani Ndlovu

Music Video: Uzongilinda/Time on YouTube

====== Background ======
In 2010 after the successes of "Fugama Unamathe" and "Uzongilinda" with Maleh, Qness decided to record another single with the latter as his strategy of moving forward from where he had previously left off. He reached out to Maleh and they got back into the studio to record the multi-chart topping hit single "Time".

====== Writing & Composition ======
Both the lyrics and music for the single were written by Qness. He sent Maleh a reference of the song which he had initially recorded with another vocalist and Maleh sessioned in studio and re-did the whole song. The results were beyond impressive and Maleh took the song to a whole new level.

====== Reception ======
In less than a week of being sampled to radio, the song was put onto high rotation on radio stations like Yfm, Metro FM, Lesedi FM, Ikwekwezi, Motsweding, Munghana Lonene and Ukhozi, etc. Qness shot a video for the song with Maleh and it featured a clip of their first collaboration "Uzongilinda" at the start of the video before transcending into "Time".

===== Believing (DJ Qness Remix) =====
Single by DJ Qness from the albums "On Cue Reloaded" & "On Cue Vol. 2"

Released: 2011

Recorded: 2010

Genre: Soulful House

Length: 07.18

Label: soWHAT Records

Writers: Avi Elman, Kafele Bandele

Producer(s): Qhubani Ndlovu

Music Video: Believing on YouTube

Originally a UPZ & Kafele collaboration, the song "Believing (DJ Qness Remix)" became the second radio single from his On Cue Vol. 2 album.

====== Reception ======
The song did exceptionally well on the market and Qness received a nod from the "deep" heads who now believed in his ability to switch from "commercial" to "deep" house and still deliver exceptionally well.

====== Imiyalo ======
Single by DJ Qness taken from his On Cue Vol. 2 album. It was also the first radio single which wasn't included on "On Cue Reloaded" to be sampled from the full Vol. 2 album.

Released: 2012

Recorded: 2011

Genre: Afro Tribal House

Length: 07.42

Label: Universal Music/Qness Production/Cue Ness Communications

Composers: Qhubani Ndlovu

Writers: Nomalungelo Dladla, Muzi Ngwenya

Producer(s): Qhubani Ndlovu

====== Background ======
Imiyalo was originally an afro jazz song by prominent Swaziland songstress Nomalungelo Dladla, who was signed to Claiming Ground Records. Qness first heard the song from Mthulisi Patrick, incidentally the same guy who introduced him to Oluhle back in 2008. Immediately Qness fell in love with the song and he wanted to remix it. After several attempts, Claiming Ground Records CEO Muzi Ngwenya granted Qness the permission to remix the song.

====== Reception ======
It was also very well received and they performed in on SABC 1 Live Amp, Yo TV, Shiz Niz, as well as Club 808. Radio-wise it charted exceptionally well and went on to become the official lead single of the "On Cue Vol. 2" album.

===== I Do =====
Single by DJ Qness & Simi Ogunleye taken from his On Cue Vol. 2 album. It was also the second radio single from the album which wasn't included on the "On Cue Reloaded" deluxe repackage album.

Released: 2011

Recorded: 2010

Genre: Soulful House

Length: 07.42

Label: Universal Music/Cue Ness Communications

Composers: Qhubani Ndlovu

Writers: Simi Ogunleye

Producer(s): Qhubani Ndlovu

====== Background ======
"I Do" was originally a song by Nigerian singer Simi Ogunleye. Qness first heard the vocals of the song online and immediately wanted to remix it.

====== Reception ======
The general reception to the song was mixed to fair. This became the last single that he released from the album.

=== On Cue Vol. 3 (Album) ===
On Cue Vol. 3 is the third studio album by DJ Qness. It was released in 2013 by Soul Candi Records and featured collaborations with prominent acts such as Oliver Mtukudzi, Marissa Guzmann, Marie Chan (from Jamali), Kafele Bandele & Moneoa, to name just a few.

The recording sessions for the album took place at the then Soul Candi Pyramid Studios as well as Qness's studio in the Vaal.

==== Track listing ====
No.	Title	Writer(s)	Producer(s)	Length
1.	"Trouble Sleeping (feat. Marie Chan)"	Corinne Bailey Rae, John Beck, Steve Chrisanthou	Qhubani Ndlovu	05.08
2.	"Chocolate Butterfly (feat. Kafele)"	Qhubani Ndlovu, Kafele Bandele	Qhubani Ndlovu/Afrikan Roots	06.39
3.	"Leave it to Me (feat. Justin Chalice)"	Qhubani Ndlovu, Justin Chalice	Qhubani Ndlovu	06.11
4.	"Everything (feat. Msimisi)"	Q. Ndlovu, F. V Ndlovu, M. Sithole, M. Ngwenya	Qhubani Ndlovu/Fransisco Ndlovu	07.42
5.	"Look Inside (feat. Marissa Guzman)"	Qhubani Ndlovu, Marissa Nicole Guzmann	Qhubani Ndlovu/Afrikan Roots	06.12
6.	"Hatida Hondo (feat. Oliver Mtukudzi)"	Oliver Mtukudzi/Steve Dyer	Qhubani Ndlovu/Deep Legendz/Afrikan Roots	05.40
7.	"The Heavy Drum"	Thabo Mashego	Thabo Mashego	07.39
8.	"Avulekile Amasango"	Q. Ndlovu/I. Morabe/L. Tyamara/S.I Langa/J.Siyabonga	Qhubani Ndlovu	06.20
9.	"Calling (feat. Moneoa)"	Qhubani Ndlovu, Moneoa Moshesh	Qhubani Ndlovu	05.56
10.	"I Get Weak (feat. Letoya Makhene)"	Qhubani Ndlovu, Letoya Makhene	Qhubani Ndlovu	07.12
11.	"Promises (feat. Khwezi)"	Qhubani Ndlovu, Khwezi	Qhubani Ndlovu	05.39
12.	"You (feat. Amanda Mo)"	Qhubani Ndlovu, Sitsandzile Amanda Motsa	Qhubani Ndlovu	06.56
13.	"Remember the First Night"	M. Kama/H. Thari/T.Ntshabele/T. Malipiti/K. Molosiwa	T. Malipiti/K. Molosiwa	06.20
14.	"Day Dreamer (feat. December streets)"	Q. Ndlovu/M. Ngwenya/T. Coetzee/C. Clasen/N. Van Loggerenberg/G. Meyer/W. Boshoff	Mozaik the Producer/ Qhubani Ndlovu	03.28

==== Singles ====
- "Everything" (2013)
- "Look Inside" (2013)
- "My World" (featuring former South African Idol finalist Kyle Deutsch) (2015)

===== Everything =====
Single by DJ Qness taken from his On Cue Vol. 3 album. It was also the first radio single from the album.

Released: 2013

Recorded: 2012

Genre: Soulful House

Length: 07.42

Label: Soul Candi Records/Cue Ness Communications

Composers: Qhubani Ndlovu, Francisco V. Ndlovu

Writers: Msimisi Sithole, Muzi Ngwenya

Producer (s): Qhubani Ndlovu/ Francisco Ndlovu

Music Video: Everything on YouTube

Format: CD, Digital, Mobile Ringtone

===== Look Inside =====
Single by DJ Qness taken from his On Cue Vol. 3 album. It was also the second radio single from the album.

Released: 2013

Recorded: 2013

Genre: Soulful House

Length: 06.14

Label: Soul Candi Records/Cue Ness Communications

Composers: Qhubani Ndlovu

Writer (s): Marissa Nicole Guzman

Producer (s): Qhubani Ndlovu/ Afrikan Roots

Format: CD, Digital, Mobile Ringtone

===== My World =====
Song by DJ Qness (featuring former South African Idol finalist Kyle Deutsch) released as a single from Qness's 2016 yet to be titled studio album.

Released: 5 August 2015

Recorded: 2015

Genre: Electronic Dance Music

Length: 03.42

Label: Cue Ness Communications

Composers: Qhubani Ndlovu, Francisco V. Ndlovu

Writer(s): Kyle Deutsch

Producer (s): Qhubani Ndlovu/ Muzi "Mozaik The Producer" Ngwenya

Format: CD, Digital Download

====== Background ======
On 30 July 2015 DJ Qness posted what seemed to be an artwork for a new single with the vague caption "#FYI #6". The artwork was labelled "My World" by DJ Qness & Kyle Deutsche.

A week later on the 5th of August 2015 Qness dropped the single online along with a press release and immediately it went viral on social media.

====== Critical reception ======
The Global Spectator, a site that reports on entertainment news described the song as "the song for summer" while IDM Mag described it as "having all the makings of a radio and charts friendly, catchy pop tune."

And surely enough prominent South African Broadcasting Corporation pop station 5FM was the first one to break the song on radio play listing it within days of release. While many of his fans & critics were excited of his new release, a sizable few criticized him for changing his style and for supposedly making a switch from deep & commercial house, to the new trendy EDM & pop influences on this new release. However Qness responded by saying he was "growing as a brand" and "expanding" reach in terms of his sound.

=== Coke Studio ===
On 17 August 2015 Qness announced vaguely through an Instagram post that he would be part of Coke Studio South Africa. This was going to be the very first Coke Studio season ever in South Africa and would feature other prominent South African acts such as December Streets (with whom he did a fusion with on the show), Micasa, Cassper Nyovest, Donald, and Ricky Rick, to name just a few.
