= Coenie de Villiers =

South African musician

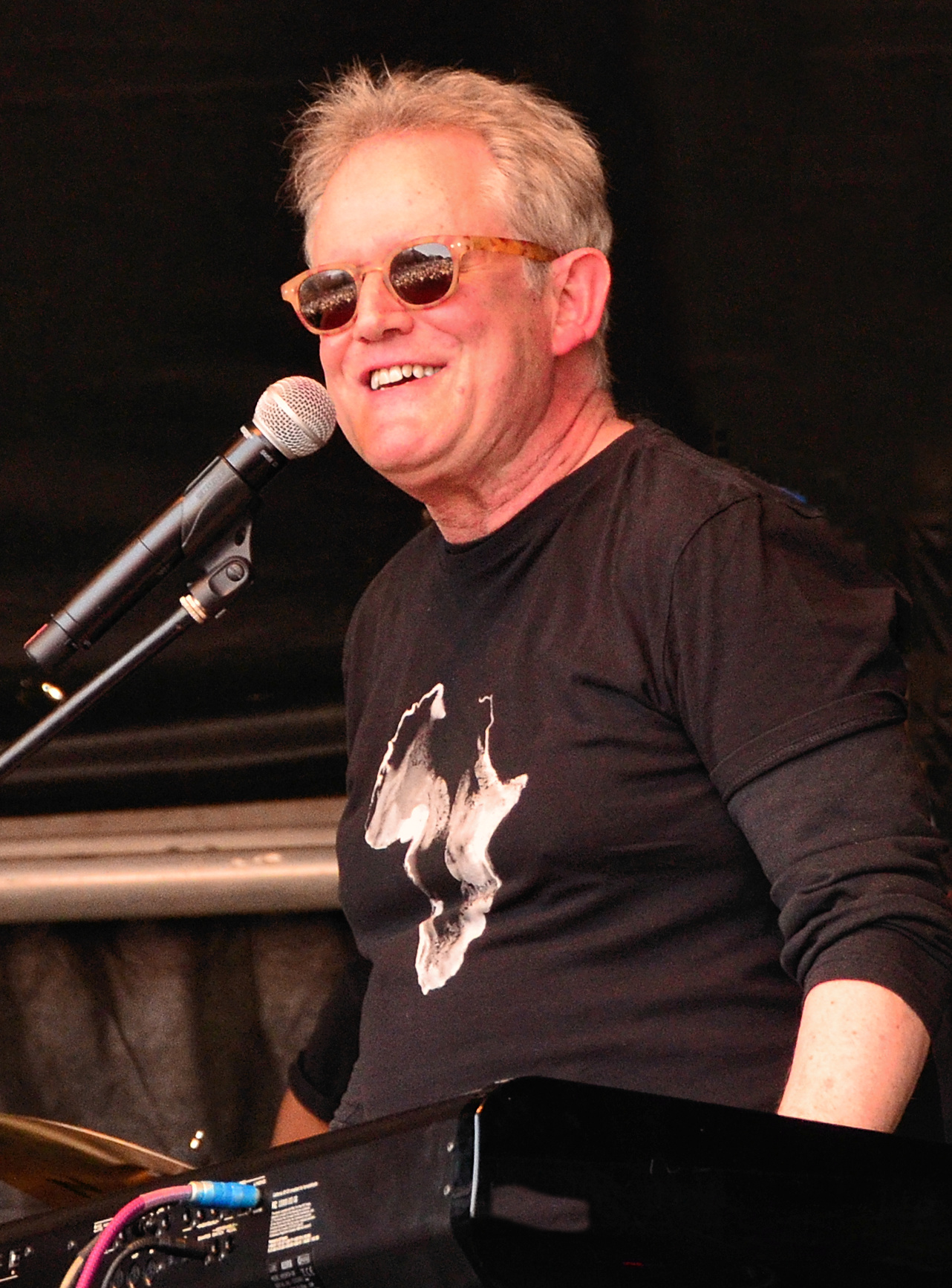

Background information
- Born: Coenraad Grabe de Villiers; 11 October 1956 (age 69); Bloemfontein, South Africa
- Occupation: Singer/songwriter
- Instrument: Piano

Coenie de Villiers (Coenraad Grabe de Villiers), born 11 October 1956, is a South African singer-songwriter, pianist, pop artist who sings in his mother tongue, Afrikaans. If any comparison was required, Coenie's music is best compared to the pop/rock of Herbert Groenemeyer (German language) or Billy Joel (US English language).

== Early life ==
Born in Bloemfontein, South Africa, Coenie was educated at University of the Free State majoring in media studies where he later on lectured in the Communications faculty. He has always viewed his musical career as his second vocation. He is also a classically trained pianist.

== 1980s ==
During the late 1980s and 1990s, Coenie spent a few years in self-imposed exile in Cyprus. He wrote, recorded and produced the album Amper Alleen in Cyprus and in Athens, Greece. Amper Alleen was the second SA album to be released on CD.

Coenie has performed in New Zealand, Canada, the Netherlands, Belgium, and the United Kingdom

Coenie and his family returned to South Africa after the release of Nelson Mandela and the unbanning of the ANC. He released Hartland, an album which included a vocal performance by Lesley Rae Dowling.

Coenie signed with Mountain Records in 1983, and recorded his debut album, Skoppensboer, working with producer, Patrick Lee-Thorp and engineer, Kevin Shirley, in the same year. He subsequently recorded 4 albums for the label many of which won industry awards. In addition he contributed to label compilations of his work. Since leaving Mountain Records he has recorded a number of one off projects for different labels.

== Personal life ==
De Villiers presents the TV show "Kwêla" on DStv's KykNET channel. He has also managed a marketing company in Gauteng and worked as a radio DJ, television presenter, and advertising executive.

== Discography ==
- Skoppensboer (Mountain Records) 1983
- Die Reisiger (Mountain Records)
- Kruispaaie (Mountain Records)
- Amper Alleen (Recorded in Cyprus and Athens)(Mountain Records)
- Hartland (Mountain Records)
- Karoo Nagte (1990) (Mountain Records)
- Liefdesversies (Mountain Records) 1998
- Ek Wens
- Hooglied
- Solo
- Zen
- Handgemaak (unplugged)(SAMA Award, Huisgenoot TEMPO Award)
- Weerlig oor die See (2008)
- Dekade (2009)
- Hart van Glas (2011)
- Emoji
- Pure Coenie
- ' ' Coenie 2.2"
