= The Pacific Express =

South African jazz-rock band

The Pacific Express (initially known as The Pacifics) was a jazz-rock band based on the Cape Flats of Cape Town in the 1970s. The band were from the coloured community and were ground breakers in both musical and political fields.

== Band members ==
The founder members included Paul Abrahams - bass, Jack Momple - drums and Issy Ariefdien - guitar. This trio took over the leadership of the band. In the beginning, there were different temporary members added but the line-up settled with the addition of Chris Schilder (later known as Ibrahim Kalil Shihab) on piano and Zayn Adam(s) and Kitty Tshikana on vocals, when they took up their residency at the Sherwood Lounge (John Petersen) in Manenberg. Percussionist, Vic Higgins joined the group in the mid-'70s.

The group were something of an informal "jazz school" when there was no such thing in Cape Town. The more experienced players inducted new young players whom they identified as talented to sit in and even later join the band. Such players as Tony Cedras, Jonathan Butler, Alvin Dyers, and others got the chance to stand alongside names like, trumpeter Stompie Manana and alto saxman Barney Rachabane on the same stage. Horn players, Basil Coetzee and Robbie Jansen also cut their teeth in The Express (as they were also known). These two recorded with the band on the Black Fire project.

== Discrimination ==
On several occasions the group fell foul of Apartheid laws and discrimination by the state broadcaster, SABC. On one occasion they were asked to leave the stage of an international tour by Australian act John Paul Young, because the law forbade racially mixed performers on the same stage. The promoters, band management (Paddy Lee-Thorp) and members refused to bow to the warnings from the police, who in the end backed down despite the law, partly because the incident made the Australian newspapers.

Somewhat ironically they scored their biggest success with a soul ballad penned by Chris Schilder and sung by the group's lead vocalist, Zayn Adams, called "Give a Little Love", which gave them a country wide fan base outside their real love and mission as jazz-rockers. The video clip of their hit song was removed from the TV airways after the SABC realised that the group were "local" of mixed race, which was against rules for so called local artists in public performance at the time.

== Split ==
After several years of success at the Sherwood, the group split with Schilder and Ariefdien forming a new band and taking over the Sherwood gig. The remaining members continued the band, now with Butler and Cedras, and were resident at the Goldfinger Lounge in Athlone Cape Town. It was this new line-up that recorded their third LP.

Their second LP was pirated extensively in Ghana and Nigeria where it was also legally available though not properly commercially distributed in many of the official stores in the region. The name of the group was well known in the region based on the piracy. The album, On Time was released in France and later in Japan in the 1970s. Many years later in circa 2000 two CDs under the title, Pacific Express Anthology Part 1 and Part 2 were issued from tapes re-stored from Mono and Stereo backup 1/4 inch copy masters of the group's recordings. Some tracks were sadly not able to be restored so the CDs are not a complete anthology.

In 2017, their debut release, Black Fire, was re-issued as a limited edition collectors vinyl LP. The group's management also announced the plans to re-issue the second album on vinyl in the same year.

The group recorded 3 albums (Black Fire, On Time and Expressions) and a compilation LP, initially released by EMI South Africa on music cassette and LP, and the subsequently issued CDs were on Mountain Records.
