= Myepic =

South African band

my/epic/vice
- Origin: Johannesburg, South Africa
- Genres: Rock, alternative rock
- Years active: 2006–Present
- Label: indie
- Members: Jeff Strodl, Matthys Cronje, JP Sing, Jonathan Jackson
- Past members: Grant Bez, Kerran Yates
- Website: www.myepic.co.za

Myepic (also known as my/epic/vice) is a South African band featuring singer Jeff Strodl, bassist Matthys Cronje, lead guitarist JP Sing and percussionist Jonathan Jackson.

The band's debut full-length album, The Love Industry, was released on Murdercall Records under their original name Myepic. It was produced by Hanu de Jong of The Narrow. Two years later a seven-track EP, Happiness Hurts, followed on Sheer Sound. It was produced by SAMA-winner Neal Snyman and included the Springbok Nude Girls. Lyrically this material was darker, encapsulating various challenges and temptations faced by band members and their rock 'n roll lifestyle.

Highlights of the band's career include touring Germany in 2006, opening for Seether in 2008, and touring with South African stalwarts The Parlotones. They were nominated for an MK music award for their video for the song Concerning Sickness. In 2010 Kahn Morbee provided additional vocals on the track "Don't You Love Dancing". "Make up your mind" was written by Jay Bones from Fuzigish, with Strodl. The band played live on an internet broadcast to fans around the world on the 1st season of SkyRoomLive in 2012.

== Releases ==
Myepic released their debut full-length album The Love Industry in 2006 and a 7-track EP Happiness Hurts on Sheer Sound in 2008.

== Band members ==
- Jeff Strodl – lead vocals, guitar
- Matthys Cronje – bass guitar
- JP Sing – guitar
- Jonathan Jackson – drums
- Kerran Yates – drums (2010–2012)
- Grant Bez – guitar, vocals (2006–2011)
- Janlo van den Heefer – drums (2007–2009)
