= Goema =

South African hand drum

Goema, also written Ghomma and Gomma, is a type of hand drum used in the Cape Minstrel Carnival and in Cape Jazz in Cape Town. The word has also come to describe a hybrid musical genre which itself is one of the influences on Cape Jazz music. Notable goema musicians include Mac McKenzie, Hilton Schilder, Errol Dyers and Alex van Heerden.
