= New Academics =

- Origin: Cape Town, South Africa
- Genres: Funk rock, alternative hip hop, jazz fusion
- Years active: 2004–present
- Labels: Independent
- Members: Joe Penn; Dave Baudains; Brendon van Rooyen

New Academics is a four-piece Funk rock band formed in Cape Town, South Africa. They are currently based in Johannesburg. They are known for their mixture of Afro-beat, Jazz, Hard rock, Funk and Hip hop in their music and have built a solid a following in South Africa and Europe with their debut album City of Strange.

In 2008, the New Academics were nominated for a SAMA (South African Music Award) in the category of "Best Alternative Album".

== Members ==
=== Current ===
- Joe Penn – vocals (2004–present)
- David Baudains – guitar (2004–present)
- Brendon van Rooyen – drums (2007–2009, 2020–present)

=== Previous ===
- Rob Smith – drums (2014–2019)
- Jacques Du Plessis – bass guitar (2016–2018)
- Hugh Hunt – bass (2014–2016)
- Sean Strydom – bass (2010)
- Howie Combrink – drums (2006–2007, 2009–2010)
- Martin Labuschagne – bass (2006–2009)
- Darius B – drums (2006)
- Richard Broderick – drums (2004–2005)

== Discography ==
- 2023 – The Great Romancer
- 2016 – Growler Front
- 2006 – City of Strange, Seed Music/Sheer Sound
- 2008 – The Apple
