= Jean Morrison (musician) =

South African singer-songwriter and musician

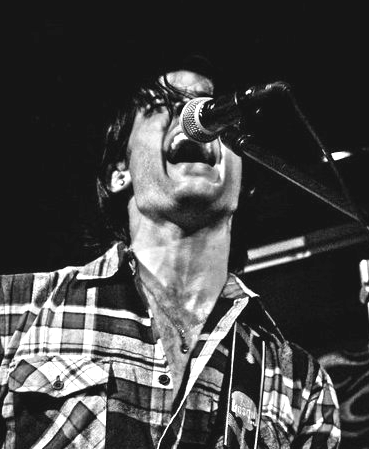
- Jean Morrison, 2011

Background information
- Born: 22 April 1984 (age 42); Durban, Kwazulu-Natal, South Africa
- Genres: Alternative rock; acoustic
- Occupations: Musician, songwriter
- Instruments: Vocals, guitar
- Years active: 2005–present
- Website: jeanmorrisonmusic.com

Jean Morrison is a South African alternative rock singer-songwriter and musician. He released an EP in 2008 (F.A.W.E.) which was produced by Video Killed The Radio Star guitarist and Squeal frontman, David Birch. His music has been compared to Radiohead, Jeff Buckley and Muse and he has supported South African acts such as Stealing Love Jones, Josie Field, Farryl Purkiss and Squeal. He toured South Africa nationally with Steve Murray from Stealing Love Jones.

== Early life ==
Jean Morrison was born in Durban, South Africa. While performing at a local open-mic night, Morrison was spotted by South African singer-songwriter, Farryl Purkiss, who invited Jean to open for him.

== Career ==
On 19 August 2008, Morrison released his debut EP, F.A.W.E., at the Dockyard Theatre in Durban. The EP was recorded at Tropical Sweat Studios with David Birch. Morrison described the genre on the EP as "neo-acoustic romanticised ballroom rock". Well received by critics, South African national newspaper, The Citizen, described Morrison as a "considerable writing talent" and F.A.W.E. as having "Convincing Clarity". "Now & Then" was the first single from the EP and was added to rotation on East Coast Radio. In 2008, Morrison performed at the annual White Mountain Festival.

"Cardboard Skies" was released as a single in 2015. The music video aired on the cable network AXS TV. It debuted at No. 18 on the ITunes New Rock releases Chart for the USA. "Cardboard Skies" was one of the finalists in the Rock/Alternative category of the 20th Annual USA Songwriting Competition in 2015.
