= December Streets =

South African rock band

- Origin: Pretoria, South Africa
- Genres: Indie rock, pop rock
- Years active: 2009–present
- Label: 2 Feet Music / Sheer Sound
- Members: Tristan Coetzee; Matthew Tager; Waldo Boshoff; Corneil Classen; Neil Markgraaff
- Past members: Daniel Raubenheimer; Michael Schoeman; Erich Britz; Nico van Loggerenberg; Gideon Meyer
- Website: decemberstreets.com

December Streets is an indie rock band formed in late 2009 in Pretoria, South Africa. December Streets consists of Tristan Coetzee (lead vocals, rhythm guitar), Nico van Loggerenberg (lead guitar, keyboards), Gideon Meyer (bass, saxophone), Waldo Boshof (trumpet, keyboards) and Corneil Classen (drums).

The band released its debut EP, titled EP, on 20 January 2011, featuring radio singles such as My Name, Fire Through the Window and Dance with Somebody. December Streets broke onto the national radio charts, with My Name and Fire Through the Window, both charting on national radio, including 5FM. The following year, after several line up changes, the band's current line up met through attending the University of Pretoria and together wrote and released their debut studio album, This Is, on 2 August 2012.

== History ==
=== Formation and early years ===
Tristan Coetzee and Gideon Meyer met through mutual friends during high school. Shortly after meeting each other, Gideon joined Tristan's first musical project, Local Authority, a young punk band. After various musical projects, Tristan & Gideon got together again with Michael Schoeman (Guitar) Daniel Raubenheimer (Drums) and Erich Britz (Keyboard) to form what would be the beginning phases of December Streets, then called The December Streets. In 2009 after experimenting with various genres, they decided to go to studio to record a 3 track demo, which included future singles Fire Through the Window and My Name.

Due to university and work pressures, band members, Michael Schoeman, Daniel Raubenheimer and Erich Britz left the band in 2010, before the release of their debut EP. After several line-up changes Tristan and Gideon met Corneil, Waldo and Nico at the University of Pretoria through various musical programmes. The newly reformed band quickly gained a following among students in their hometown of Pretoria. After receiving nationwide success with their first single, My Name, they decided to launch their rerecorded debut EP. In 2012, December Streets recorder and released their debut album, This Is, after signing with 2 Feet Music (a division of Sheer Sound).

=== EP (2011) ===
The band's first physical release was simply entitled EP and was released on 20 January 2011. The 6-track EP was recorded at Antimotion Studio. Four singles followed from the EP, with fan favourite "My Name", making it to the number 1 position on 5FM's Rock Chart, as well as a spot in the top 40 on the International Chart. Two other singles, "Fire Through the Window" and "Who Needs Shoes" reached the top 10 charts on the local Tuks FM charts. The EP was sold at shows only, and given away for free under creative commons. Fans were encouraged to copy, share and distribute the album as much as possible.

=== This Is (2012) ===
In 2012, December Streets started recording their debut album This Is after signing with 2 Feet Music (a division of Sheer Sound). The album consists of the rerecorded hit singles from the EP and brand new tracks written in 2012. It was produced and recorded at Antimotion Studio in Johannesburg and was released to the public on 2 August 2012. It includes the four radio hits on national radio station 5FM, "My Name", "Fire Through the Window", "Got That Feeling" and "Thief".

== Band members ==
=== Current members ===
- Tristan Coetzee (vocals, rhythm guitar)
- Waldo Boshoff (trumpet, keyboards)
- Corneil Classen (drums)
- Matthew Tager (vocals)
- Neil Markgraaf (guitar)

=== Former members ===
- Daniel Raubenheimer (drums)
- Michael Schoeman (guitar)
- Erich Britz (keyboards)
- Nico van Loggerenberg (lead guitar, keyboards)
- Gideon Meyer (bass guitar, saxophone)

== Shows ==
December Streets continue to play at shows and festivals across South Africa including:

Notable Shows
Region	Show/Festival
Gauteng	VredeFest; Tequila and Mexican Food Festival; Park Acoustics
Kwazulu-Natal	Splashy Fen; SA's Big 5
Limpopo	Oppikoppi; Aardklop
Eastern Cape and Western Cape	MK Avontoer; Up the Creek

== Discography ==
=== Albums and EPs ===
==== Studio albums ====
List of studio albums
Title	Album details
EP	Released: 20 January 2011; Label: N/A; Formats: CD, digital download
This Is	Released: 2 August 2012; Label: 2 Feet Music (division of Sheer Sound); Formats: CD, digital download
Untitled	Planned release: August 2014; Label: 2 Feet Music (division of Sheer Sound); Formats: CD, digital download
Last Forever	Released: 8 July 2022; Label: N/A; Formats: Streaming

=== Singles ===
- "Who Needs Shoes" (2011)
- "My Name" (2011)
- "Fire Through the Window" (2011)
- "Got that Feeling" (2012)
- "Thief" (2013)
- "Kickstart" (2023)
- "GHOSTS" (2024)
- "The Meaning" (2024)
