= Sons of Table Mountain =

South African jazz band

Sons of Table Mountain was a South African jazz band formed by Robbie Jansen. In addition to Jansen, the band included pianist Hilton Schilder, Steven Erasmus, Jack Momplé and Alex van Heerden. In the 1990s, the band regularly performed for audiences from all socioeconomic backgrounds – from impoverished communities in Cape Flats to political dignitaries in post-apartheid South Africa.

Jansen released his second album in 2000, Cape Doctor, having used the group to record with him. They were one of the pioneers of the new Cape Jazz.
