= DJ Mujava =

South African DJ and electronic music producer

Elvis Maswanganyi (born c. 1985), better known as DJ Mujava, is a South African DJ and record producer. He has released music through Warp Records, This Is Music and Sheer House.

== Life and work ==
Maswanganyi was raised in the Pretorian town of Atteridgeville.

DJ Mujava's co-produced bacardi house track alongside DJ Spoko "Township Funk" was released on Warp Records in 2008. It was played by Gilles Peterson on BBC Radio 1. Mujava mixed a half-hour session in 2008 on BBC Radio 6 for an episode of 6 Mix hosted by Iyare. He has been featured by BBC Asian Network's DJ Kayper and Sonny Ji, and BBC Radio 1Xtra's DJ Edu and MistaJam. DJ Mujava is signed to This Is Music in the UK and Warp Records internationally. Maswanganyi was voted number 34 on NME's Cool List in 2008, and is a featured artist on the NME website.

The film "Future Sound of Mzansi" produced by Spoek Mathambo and distributed by Vice, features an interview with DJ Mujava in which he says that being arrested for marijuana possession resulted in detention in Weskoppies psychiatric hospital and being forcibly injected with drugs that have affected his subsequent music production. In 2010, Mujava collaborated with Zimbabwean-South African DJ and record producer DJ Qness, for a remix single" XXXO", originally by the UK based pop singer M.I.A.

== Discography ==
=== Albums ===
- Sgubhu Sa Pitori (Sheer House, 2006)
- Sgubhu Sa Pitori 3 (Sheer House, 2008)

=== Singles ===
- "Township Funk" (This Is Music and Warp, 2008)
- "Township Funk Remixes" (This Is Music and Warp, 2009)
