= Sock hop =

Dance event

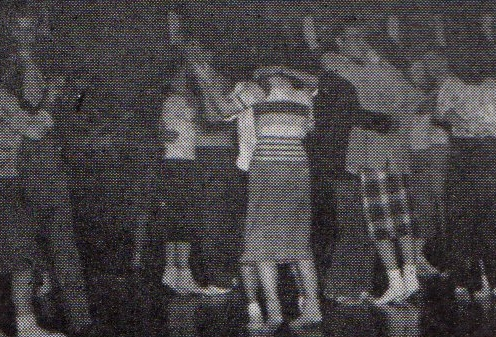
Sock hop at Shimer College, Illinois, in 1948

A sock hop or sox hop, often also called a record hop or just a hop, was an informal (but officially organized) dance event for teenagers in mid-20th-century North America, featuring popular music.

The term sock hop came about because dancers were required to remove their shoes to protect the varnished floor of the gymnasium.

== History ==
In 1755, Samuel Johnson defined hop as "a place where meaner people dance." In America by the 1800s it came to mean "a dance where there is less display and ceremony than at regular balls", and later "a social event at which people mix together and dance in an informal way."

Dances in the U.S. were publicized as "sock hops" as early as 1943. Also, in 1943–44 "sock hops" were held by the American Junior Red Cross to raise funds during World War II. By 1944–45 some high-schoolers’ dances were being publicized specifically as “sock hops” across the U.S. A national magazine cited the fad among Oklahoma City teenagers in 1948. Sock hops were commonly held at high schools and other educational institutions, often in the school gymnasium or cafeteria.

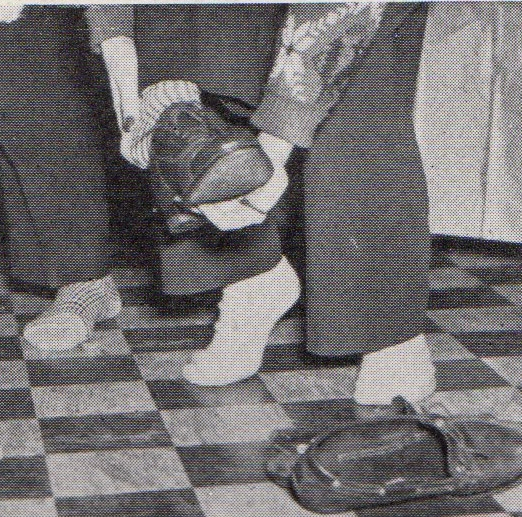
Students removing their shoes for a sock hop.

The music at a sock hop was usually played from vinyl records, sometimes presented by a disc jockey. Occasionally there were live bands. In later years, "hops" became strongly associated with the 1950s and early rock and roll. "At the Hop", a song by Danny & the Juniors that debuted in 1957, names many popular and novelty dances and otherwise documented what occurred at a hop.

In subsequent decades, with the widespread popularity of sneakers and other types of indoors-only footwear, the practice of removing shoes was dropped. The term then came to be applied more generally to any informal dance for teenagers.

== Revival ==
The term caught on in England in the late 1970s during a British rockabilly revival, led by groups like The Stray Cats. "Life Begins at the Hop", a song celebrating sock hops, became the first charting single for XTC.

== See also ==
- Sokkie - a similar idea in South Africa
- School dance - modern incarnation of sock hops, shoes typically being mandatory for safety purposes (to avoid slipping and falling, shoe theft, etc.)
- Prom - formal school dance in North American high schools, usually held for seniors (and sometimes juniors in a 'junior prom') at the end of the school year
- Social dance
- Bobby soxer
