= Jonathan Butler (album) =

Studio album by Jonathan Butler
- Released: 1987
- Studio: Battery, London, UK; Minot Sound, White Plains, New York; Hit Factory, New York City; Unique Recording, New York City; Sigma Sound, New York City
- Genre: Jazz; Funk; Soul
- Producer: Barry Eastmond: Bryan "Chuck" New

Jonathan Butler chronology
Jonathan Butler (1987)	More Than Friends (1988)

Singles from Jonathan Butler
- 1. "Lies" Released: 1987; 2. "Overflowing" Released: 1987

Jonathan Butler is a 1987 album by South African singer-guitarist Jonathan Butler.

== Critical reception ==
Professional ratings
Review scores
Source	Rating
Allmusic	3/5 stars

Ron Wynn of Allmusic in a 3/5 stars review, described this as "The album that made Butler a star. The sweeping ballads, catchy uptempo, dance-oriented hits, and multi-tracked overdubs and background vocalists helped make his music a staple on late '80s Urban Contemporary radio."

One Heartbeat was ranked at No. 2 on Robert K. Oermann of USA Today's list of 1987's top 50 R&B albums.

== Track listing ==
All songs written by Jonathan Butler and Jolyon Skinner, except where noted.

1. "Lies" (US No. 27; UK No. 18) - 4:37
2. "Love Songs, Candlelight & You" - 5:00
3. "Going Home" (Butler) - 4:44
4. "I Miss Your Love Tonight" (Butler, Skinner, Barry Eastmond) - 4:20
5. "Holding On" - 4:12
6. "One More Dance" - 4:37
7. "Take Good Care Of Me" - 4:28
8. "Barenese" - 4:33
9. "All Over You" - 4:34
10. "Overflowing" (Butler, Eastmond, Keith Diamond) - 4:05
11. "Lovin' You" - 4:58
12. "Sunset" (Butler) - 4:15
13. "Say We'll Be Together" - 4:00
14. "Give A Little More Lovin'" (Butler, Simon May) - 4:10
15. "Reunion" (Butler, Eastmond) - 5:03
16. "High Tide" (Butler) - 4:42

== Personnel ==
- Jonathan Butler – lead vocals (1, 2, 4–7, 9–11, 13, 14), backing vocals (1, 2, 5–7, 9, 11, 13), lead guitar (1, 3, 6, 8, 10, 12, 13, 15, 16), rhythm arrangements (3, 8, 13, 16), guitars (4, 5, 9, 11), keyboards (11, 15), 12-string guitar (12), all instruments (14)
- Barry Eastmond – keyboards (1–13, 15, 16), horn arrangements (1, 5), rhythm arrangements (3, 7, 8, 13, 15, 16), string arrangements (6, 7, 11, 12), drum programming (9), Simmons drums (10)
- Eric Rehl – keyboards (2, 4–6, 8, 9), synthesizers (12)
- Jason Miles – synth horns (9), synthesizer programming (11, 13, 15)
- Ira Siegel – rhythm guitar (1, 10)
- Doc Powell – rhythm guitar (3, 13, 15, 16), guitars (10)
- Wayne Braithwaite – bass (1, 2, 5, 7, 10–13)
- Luico Hopper – bass (3, 16)
- Buddy Williams – drums (1–3, 8, 15, 16)
- Chris Parker – drums (5)
- Terry Silverlight – drums (6, 7, 12)
- Bernard Davis – drums (10)
- Bashiri Johnson – percussion (2, 5, 7–10, 12, 16)
- Ralph MacDonald – percussion (3, 15)
- Anthony MacDonald – percussion (13)
- Charles Dougherty – horns (1, 5)
- V. Jeffrey Smith – horns (1, 5), backing vocals (2, 4, 6, 9, 10)
- Earl Gardner – horns (1, 5)
- Ron Tooley – horns (1, 5)
- Chris Hunter – alto saxophone (3, 11)
- Chris White – alto saxophone (7)
- Ed Salkin – alto saxophone (10)
- Thomas Flammia – backing vocals (1, 2, 5, 6, 9, 11, 13)
- Curtis King – backing vocals (1, 5, 7)
- Yolanda Lee Lewis – backing vocals (1, 2, 4–6, 9, 10, 13)
- Brenda White-King – backing vocals (1, 5, 7, 11, 13)
- Diane Williams – backing vocals (1, 5, 10, 11, 13)
- Dolly Eastmond – backing vocals (2, 4)
- Audrey Wheeler – backing vocals (2, 4, 9)
- Vaneese Thomas – backing vocals (4, 6)
- Phillip Ballou – backing vocals (5, 7, 11, 13)
- Ethel Beatty – backing vocals (7)
- Katie Kissoon – backing vocals (7)

=== Production ===
- Mike Noble – A&R
- Barry Eastmond – producer (1–13, 15, 16)
- Bryan "Chuck" New – mixing (1, 5, 9, 14), producer (14)
- Nigel Green – mixing (2–4, 6–8, 10–13, 15, 16)
- Carl Beatty – engineer
- Joe Blaney – engineer
- Steve Peck – engineer
- Steve Power – engineer
- Bruce Robbins – engineer
- Zombart – sleeve design
- Rob Lee – photography
- Jonathan Butler – liner notes
- Running Dog Management – management

== Charts ==
=== Weekly charts ===
Chart (1987)	Peak position
Australian (Kent Music Report)|	69
Dutch Albums (Album Top 100)	37
German Albums (Offizielle Top 100)	35
New Zealand Albums (RMNZ)	30
Swedish Albums (Sverigetopplistan)	33
UK Albums (OCC)	12
US Billboard 200	50
US Top R&B/Hip-Hop Albums (Billboard)	13

=== Year-end charts ===
Chart (1987)	Position
US Top R&B/Hip-Hop Albums (Billboard)	48
Chart (1988)	Position
US Top R&B/Hip-Hop Albums (Billboard)	98
