= Lies (Jonathan Butler song) =

Single by Jonathan Butler

from the album Jonathan Butler
- B-side: "Haunted by Your Love"
- Released: June 1987
- Recorded: 1987
- Genre: Pop
- Length: 4:39 (original album version); 5:23 (extended version); 3:46 (single)
- Label: Jive
- Songwriters: Jonathan Butler, Jolyon Skinner
- Producer: Barry J. Eastmond

Jonathan Butler singles chronology
| "Baby Please Don't Take It (I Need Your Love)" (1986) | "Lies" (1987) | "Take Good Care of Me" (1988) |

"Lies" is a 1987 song by South African singer-songwriter/guitarist Jonathan Butler. It was co-written by Butler along with Jolyon Skinner.

Issued as the leadoff single from his 1987 self-titled studio album, "Lies" became a breakthrough hit on the U.S. Billboard Hot 100, peaking at No. 27 and becoming what remains his only Top 40 Pop hit to date. However, the song achieved significantly more success on the U.S. R&B chart, where it became his first of several top ten hits (cresting at #5), and also did well on the Adult Contemporary chart (#16). "Lies" also became a moderate hit in the UK (#18), and Ireland (#16), in addition to spending two weeks at No. 11 on the Canadian Adult Contemporary chart.

== Personnel ==
- Jonathan Butler – Lead vocals, lead guitar, backing vocals
- Ira Siegel – Rhythm guitar
- Barry Eastmond – Keyboards
- Wayne Brathwaite – Bass
- Buddy Williams – Drums
- Charles Dougherty, Earl Gardner, Jeff Smith, Ron Tooley – Horns
- Brenda White-King, Curtis King, Diane Green-Williams, Tom Flammia, Yolanda Lee-Lewis – Backing vocals

== Chart history ==
| Chart (1987) | Peak position |
|---|---|
| Australian (Kent Music Report) | 68 |
| Canada RPM Adult Contemporary | 11 |
| Ireland (IRMA) | 16 |
| UK (OCC) | 18 |
| US Billboard Hot 100 | 27 |
| US Billboard R&B | 4 |
| US Billboard Adult Contemporary | 16 |
| US Cash Box Top 100 | 30 |
