= Farryl Purkiss =

South African musician

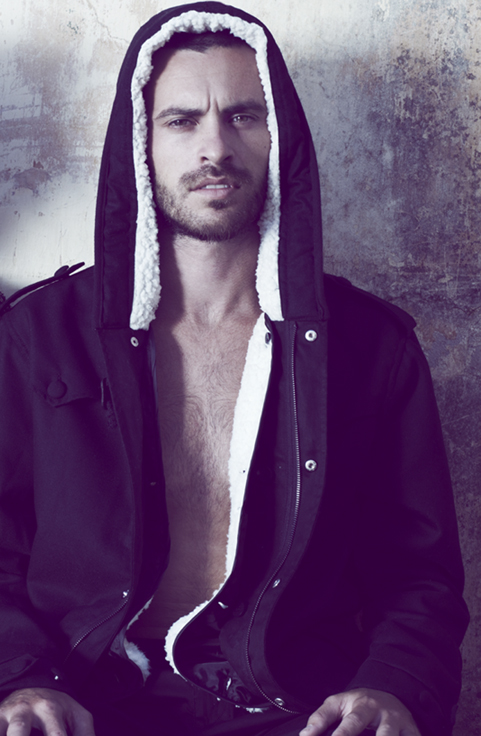
- Farryl Purkiss, 2009

Background information
- Born: Farryl David Purkiss; 20 March 1980 (age 46); Durban, Natal, South Africa
- Origin: Umhlanga, Kwa-Zulu Natal
- Genres: Folk, Acoustic Rock, Rock, pop rock, alternative, Blues, Roots
- Occupations: Singer-songwriter, musician
- Instruments: Vocals, guitar, harmonica
- Years active: 2005–Present
- Label: 2Feet Music (A division of Sheer Sound)
- Website: www.farrylpurkiss.co.za, www.2feetmusic.com

Farryl Purkiss is a South African-born singer-songwriter. Farryl first picked up the guitar when he was fifteen years old and began writing songs shortly after his sixteenth birthday. He self-released an EP in 2005 (Chapter One) that created waves in his home town of Durban, and later that year he began talks with 2Feet Music. He was signed to 2Feet Music soon after and started performing heavily outside of South Africa, leading up to the release of his full-length debut album, released in South Africa in 2007, to high acclaim, chart success and award nominations. He has toured with international artists Jack Johnson, Donavon Frankenreiter and has also shared the stage with South African acts such as Nibs Van Der Spuy, Guy Buttery, Jean Morrison and Perez. He has since spent most of his time touring the world.

Fruitbats & Crows (2009) was the long-awaited follow-up to Farryl Purkiss's 2006 internationally critically acclaimed, self-titled album. The record won a South African Music Award. In the past three years, Purkiss has toured Australia three times, Europe, USA and of course, South Africa. He has had radio success in all of the above territories, including Japan and a No. 1 in France. His songs have been used in campaigns by Nissan (Greece), Audi (UK), MTN (South Africa), as well as twice on the American TV show Private Practice. In 2007 he was voted the most popular musician by Heat Magazine (South Africa) and has been featured by every major newspaper, magazine, TV show and radio station in South Africa.

He has recently finished his 3rd full-length record (Home), which was recorded on a farm in the suburb Constantia in Cape Town, South Africa. It was produced by American producer Kieran Kelly (Sufjan Stevens, Angus & Julia Stone) It was released to massive critical acclaim and a SAMA nomination. It is due for an American release sometime in 2015.

Besides his records his songs have been used in numerous advertising campaigns, TV series and motion pictures.

== History ==
=== Early life ===
Purkiss was born in Durban, Kwa-Zulu Natal (formally Natal) and grew up in Umhlanga. Growing up, Purkiss attended Northwood High School where he dabbled in songwriting. At the age of 15 years Purkiss received a treasured sound system that his father Robert Purkiss gave to him as a gift, the very same sound system that his father handed down to him. Purkiss almost immediately sold it to his neighbour for R200 ($23) and bought a cheap guitar instead. By 16 years old he had composed his first song (Ducking & Diving).

After finishing High School, Purkiss went on to study Industrial Design. At the same time he started to have thoughts of performing the number of songs that he had been writing over the last few years. He performed his first ever gig in Umhlanga Rocks with respected South African guitar player Guy Buttery supporting fellow Durban band, Perez. He later admitted to vomiting before the show, and then playing the entire set with his eyes closed.

While making his way around the gig circuit, Purkiss was spotted by South African guitarist, Nibs van der Spuy. This led to a friendship and later an offer to record an album through Nibs van der Spuys boutique label, Greenhouse Records. Purkiss took all the money he had saved waiting on tables at a local restaurant and recorded his very first album, Chapter One, along with his band Gareth Gale (drums), Matt Wilkinson (lead guitar) and Roland Struckmeyer (bass guitar). Chapter One was nominated for a South African Music Award in the same year.

=== Chapter One (2004–2005) ===
Nibs van der Spuy encouraged Purkiss to record an album, and so Purkiss entered the studio with South African producer Dave Birch (formally vocalist and guitarist for Durban band Squeal). Along with drummer Gareth Gale, and bassist Roly Struckmeyer, Purkiss recorded what was to become Chapter One at Birch's Tropical Sweat studios in Durban. The self-financed album was released on Nibs van der Spuy's record label Greenhouse Music.

After the album was released, Purkiss met Damon Forbes who signed him to the jazz and world centric record label.

== Discography ==
- Farryl Purkiss (2006)
- Fruitbats & Crows (2009)
