= Sokkie =

Dance style

Sokkie is a style of dance that is unique to Southern Africa and popular mostly with Afrikaners. It is also a type of ballroom dance.

== Sokkie dance ==
Sokkie dance is a style of social ballroom dance with a partner. It is also referred to in Afrikaans as "langarm", "sakkie-sakkie", "kotteljons" and "Water-pomp". Similarly to the U.S. 'Sock Hop', sokkie, meaning 'sock' in Afrikaans, refers to the way young people dance sokkie in their socks and often barefoot. Sokkie dancers in nightclubs mostly wear shoes and dress smart casual.

Loopdans, two-step, swing, boogie, social foxtrot or quickstep steps, are often danced together in sokkie. A boerewals, which is a viennese waltz is also danced as sokkie. Sokkie is not only danced to sokkie music, but can be danced to many music genres, for example hip-hop, trance, country and pop. The dance "Sokkie Sokkie" originated in Southern Africa from the Afrikaner trekkers.

== Sokkie music ==
The emergence of a particular style of commercialised sokkie-music in recent years is of particular note. Examples of artists are Kurt Darren, Nicholis Louw, and Juanita du Plessis, among many others.

A favourite method of sokkie creating music or songs is to take successful English songs and translate them into Afrikaans. Or use the tune of another successful song.

Nicholis Louw even used the ringtone Blue Horizon from a Sony Ericsson cellphone for the tune of his hit song - Rock Daai Lyfie. Other English songs could also be included so that people could dance solo as well.
