= More Than Friends (album) =

Studio album by Jonathan Butler
- Released: 1988
- Studios: Battery (London, England): East Bay (Tarrytown, New York); Axis, Z, Mastersound, Soundtrack, Soundworks (New York City, New York)
- Genres: Pop, jazz
- Label: Jive
- Producers: Barry Eastmond, Loris Holland, Timmy Allen, Teddy Riley

Jonathan Butler chronology
| Jonathan Butler (1987) | More Than Friends (1988) | Heal Our Land (1990) |

More Than Friends is an album by the South African musician Jonathan Butler, released in 1988. The title track was released as a single.

The album peaked at No. 113 on the Billboard 200. Butler supported the album by touring with Najee and Angela Bofill.

== Production ==
Butler made it a point to avoid writing about South Africa and its politics. He added elements of hip hop to his sound on More Than Friends; "True Love Never Fails", a duet with Vanessa Bell Armstrong, incorporated gospel influences. Butler did not feel like he was abandoning jazz so much as becoming more aware of popular music styles. "Sekona" is an instrumental.

== Critical reception ==
Professional ratings
Review scores
| Source | Rating |
|---|---|
| AllMusic | 4/5 stars |
| The Encyclopedia of Popular Music | 4/5 stars |

The Washington Post opined that Butler "has all but abandoned whatever musical and vocal distinctiveness he once had in favor of his copycat commercial bent." The Austin American-Statesman determined that the music "is upbeat and infectious with a backbeat that overpowers its occasional lapses into formulaic radio fare." The Richmond Times-Dispatch called More Than Friends a "slickly produced album" that "moves toward the pop mainstream."

AllMusic wrote that the album "continued the de-emphasis on his guitar playing, and was his biggest, most lavishly produced set."

== Track listing ==
| No. | Title | Writer(s) | Length |
|---|---|---|---|
| 1. | "There's One Born Every Minute (I'm a Sucker for You)" | Jonathan Butler, Jolyon Skinner | 4:57 |
| 2. | "Breaking Away" | Butler, Skinner, Loris Holland | 4:45 |
| 3. | "More Than Friends" | Butler, Skinner | 5:16 |
| 4. | "Take Me Home" | Butler | 4:43 |
| 5. | "True Love Never Fails (duet with Vanessa Bell Armstrong)" | Butler, Skinner | 5:18 |
| 6. | "She's a Teaser" | Butler, Skinner | 4:19 |
| 7. | "She's Hot (Burning Up)" | Butler, Skinner | 4:10 |
| 8. | "Sarah Sarah" | Butler, Skinner | 5:04 |
| 9. | "It's So Hard to Let You Go" | Butler, Skinner | 4:53 |
| 10. | "Sekona" | Butler | 4:40 |

CD track listing

| No. | Title | Writer(s) | Length |
|---|---|---|---|
| 1. | "There's One Born Every Minute (I'm a Sucker for You)" | Butler, Skinner | 4:57 |
| 2. | "Breaking Away" | Butler, Skinner, Holland | 4:45 |
| 3. | "More Than Friends" | Butler, Skinner | 5:16 |
| 4. | "Take Me Home" | Butler | 4:43 |
| 5. | "True Love Never Fails" | Butler, Skinner | 5:18 |
| 6. | "Melodie" | Butler, Barry Eastmond | 4:40 |
| 7. | "She's a Teaser" | Butler, Skinner | 4:19 |
| 8. | "She's Hot (Burning Up)" | Butler, Skinner | 4:10 |
| 9. | "Sarah Sarah" | Butler, Skinner | 5:04 |
| 10. | "It's So Hard to Let You Go" | Butler, Skinner | 4:53 |
| 11. | "Sekona" | Butler | 4:40 |
| 12. | "Forever" | Butler, Eastmond | 4:50 |

== Personnel ==
- Jonathan Butler – vocals (1–10, 12), backing vocals (1, 3, 5, 7, 9–12), acoustic guitar (3–6, 11, 12), lead guitar (8)
- Barry Eastmond – keyboards (1, 3–7, 9–12), drum programming (1, 5, 6, 9), programming (3, 7, 11, 12), acoustic piano solo (7), synth bass (9), percussion (11)
- Loris Holland – keyboards (2, 5), drum programming (5), backing vocals (5)
- Pete Q. Harris – Fairlight programming (1, 2)
- Jim Baker – Fairlight programming (2)
- Eric Rehl – keyboards (7), programming (7)
- Teddy Riley – keyboards (8), drum programming (8)
- Lance Saban – electric guitars (2)
- Wayne Braithwaite – bass guitar (2, 4, 10)
- Timmy Allen – drum programming (3, 7), backing vocals (3, 7)
- Steve Ferrone – drums (4)
- Buddy Williams – drum overdubs (5), drums (11)
- Terry Silverlight – drums (10, 12)
- Bashiri Johnson – percussion (3, 4)
- V. Jeffrey Smith – saxophone (2, 5), backing vocals (2)
- Najee – alto saxophone (9)
- Marc Russo – alto saxophone (10)
- Will Downing – backing vocals (1)
- Curtis King – backing vocals (1, 3, 5, 9, 10, 12)
- Cindy Mizelle – backing vocals (1)
- Joyce Stovall – backing vocals (1, 2)
- Darryl Tookes – backing vocals (1, 7)
- Audrey Wheeler – backing vocals (1, 3), voice (1)
- Deborah Cooper – backing vocals (2, 9, 10, 12)
- Natalie Jackson – backing vocals (2)
- Paulette McWilliams – backing vocals (2)
- Sandra St. Victor – backing vocals (2)
- Vanessa Bell Armstrong – vocals (5)
- Alfa Anderson – backing vocals (5)
- Jocelyn Brown – backing vocals (5)
- Marva King – backing vocals (5)
- Charmaine Yates – backing vocals (5)
- The Darryl Douglas Workshop Choir – choir (5)
- Darryl Douglas – choral arrangements and conductor (5)
- Lee Drakeford – backing vocals (8)
- Aaron Hall – backing vocals (8)
- Yolanda Lee – backing vocals (9, 10, 12)
- Vaneese Thomas – backing vocals (9, 10, 12)
- Janice Dempsey – backing vocals (11)
- Brenda White-King – backing vocals (11)

Production

- Barry Eastmond – producer (1, 3–7, 9–12)
- Loris Holland – producer (2, 5)
- Timmy Allen – producer (3, 7)
- Teddy Riley – producer (8)
- Nigel Green – mixing (1, 10, 12)
- Bryan "Chuck" New – mixing (2–9, 11)
- Mike Allaire – recording engineer
- Ron Banks – recording engineer
- Carl Beatty – recording engineer
- JC – recording engineer
- Bill Esses – recording engineer
- Don Feinberg – recording engineer
- Jim Hanneman – recording engineer
- Dennis Mitchell – recording engineer
- Jonathan Elliott – design
- Zombart – design
- Peter Mountain – photography
- Sheila Rock – photography
