= Hilton Schilder =

Hilton Schilder (born 1959) is a South African musician (piano, also guitar, vocals, mbira and other instruments), well known in the genre of Cape jazz.

== Biography ==
Schilder was born in Lotus River, Cape Town, and grew up in a musical family (his father is the jazz pianist and band leader Tony Schilder). He began playing early in bands in the Kaapse Klopse. In the 1980s he founded The Genuines with Mac McKenzie, who specialized in the Goema music of the Western Cape province. Goema is a Cape Jazz style, though more inspired by the Coon troops that march annually on Tweede Newe Jaar. He led African Dream and Iconoclast (with Victor Ntoni and Vusi Khumalo). Robbie Jansen invited him to join the band Sons of Table Mountain. He also led his own groups, with whom he also performed at the Cape Town International Jazz Festival, and toured with Johannes Enders. His first album, No Turning Back (2003), was nominated in the "best contemporary jazz album" category for at the South African Music Awards (SAMA). He co-founded the duo RockArt with Alex van Heerden, which moved in the direction of acoustic and electronic minimal jazz. He has worked with Mac McKenzie, Namakwa, The District Six Band, and The Goema Captains of Cape Town. In 2008 he was artist in residence at the Bird's Eye Jazz Club in Basel.

== Discography ==
- Johannes Enders Reflections of South Africa (1996)
- No Turning Back (2003)
- RockArt Future Cape (2006)
- Elements of Surprise (2007, solo)
- Alternative (2017)
