= Merseystate =

South African rock band

Merseystate is a South African rock band formed by production duo Wayne Joshua and Shai Caleb. The band signed a record deal with local indie Label "Rivendale Records" and released their debut album The Lucky Ones in March 2008 with their first single "New Jersey Girl" rising to number 6 on the Top40 within 3 weeks. Their hit stayed in the charts for 23 consecutive weeks, making it South Africa's longest running 1st Top 40 chart entry of any SA band to date.
