= Lesego =

Lesego is a given name. Notable people with the name include:

- Lesego Makhubela (born 1986), South African politician
- Lesego Makgothi (born 1965), Mosotho politician
- Lesego Motsepe (1974–2014), South African actress
- Lesego Motsumi (1955/56-2023), Motswana politician
- Lesego Nkoane, South African soccer player
- Lesego Semenya (1982–2021), South African chef and author
- Lesego Senokwane (born 1997), South African cricketer
- Lesego Rampolokeng (born 1965), South African poet
- Lesego Tlhabi (born 1988), South African comedian
