= Jeff Maluleke =

Jeff Maluleke Jeff Makokela Maluleke
- Birth name: Jeff Makokela Maluleke
- Also known as: Jeff Maluleke
- Born: 24 March 1974; Bushbuckridge Mpumalanga
- Origin: Cottondale
- Genres: Afro Pop
- Occupation(s): Singer, Songwriter, Composer, Producer, Guitarist
- Instrument(s): Vocals, Guitar
- Years active: 1990s–present
- Labels: CCP Records

Jeff Maluleke (born 1977) is a South African musician of the M'nwanati people. Jeff was born to Dora and Johannes Maluleke in the town of Bushbuckridge, Mpumalanga in 1977, on the 24th of March. In 2002, the Kora All-Africa Music Awards honoured him as the "Revelation of the Year".

He got signed a record deal with CCP Records in September 1995 and release his album Papa Jeff, with sales over 30 000 units his album was certified gold.

In 2004, at the 10th ceremony of South African Music Awards he won best male composer for his single "Mambo".

== Discography ==
=== Albums ===
- Juliana (EMI, 2000)
- Dzovo (EMI, 2001)
- Kilimanjaro (EMI, 2001)
- Mambo: The Collection (ccp Record Company, 2004)
- Mambo (EMI, 2006)
