= Alex van Heerden =

- Born: Alex Scott Van Heerden; 23 November 1974; Port Elizabeth, South Africa
- Died: 7 January 2009 (aged 34) Cape Town, South Africa
- Genres: Jazz, electronic, South African music
- Occupation: Musician
- Instruments: Accordion, trumpet, voice
- Labels: Smallfunk, New Cape
- Formerly of: Sons of Table Mountain

Alex van Heerden (23 November 1974 – 7 January 2009) was a jazz musician from Cape Town, South Africa.

== Career ==
He was a self-taught musician who started to play trumpet at age 17, to avoid compulsory military training, during the apartheid era of South Africa. Later, on he began exploring music throughout various ways; jazz, the Karoo desert, vastrap, ghoema and electronic music played important roles.

Van Heerden worked with Robbie Jansen in Jansen's jazz group Sons of Table Mountain. He also worked together with Swedish musician and producer Håkan Lidbo, creating electronic music on the side of the jazz and the vastrap. He was a truly creative musician, always finding his own interpretations of both old and new music genres, developing music in a true way.

He also worked with his brother-in-law, composer and guitarist Derek Gripper, to recreate the rural music of the Western Cape within an acoustic setting. Together they created a style of music dubbed avant-goema, using string quartet, guitar, trumpet, vocals and accordion to open up new musical spaces within the musical landscapes of vastrap, langarm, boeremusiek, goema, and contemporary minimalism, jazz and improvisation. Their two CD releases, Sagtevlei and Ale!x document this unique musical journey, as well as the score for the work for string quartet, guitar, accordion and trumpet Spore by die Bek van 'n Ystervarkgat.

Van Heerden died, age 34, in a car accident in Cape Town.

== Discography ==
- Cape Jazz Classics (Gallo, 1996)
- Gramadoelas, Gramadoelas (Afrimusik, 1999)
- Cape Doctor, Robbie Jansen (Mountain, 2000)
- Sagtevlei, with Derek Gripper (Open, 2003)
- Future Cape, with Hilton Schilder) (Dala Flat, 2006)
- Simple, with Håkan Lidbo (Container, 2006)
- Bushtech, (Smallfunk, 2007)
- Tales of Droëland, with Paul Miller (Smallfunk, 2008)
- In the Name of Bushtech (SinergyNetworks, 2008)
- Nefertiti, with Magnus Johansson (Mavo, 2008)
- Ale!x, with Derek Gripper and Brydon Bolton
