= Mountain Records =

South African record label

Mountain Records is a record label started in Cape Town, South Africa in 1980 by Patrick Lee-Thorp.

The record label produces mostly South African music and is known as the home of Cape Jazz recordings, having issued a number of albums by such names as Basil Coetzee, Robbie Jansen, Jonathan Butler, Tony Schilder and others.

In the early years of the label's existence, a certain amount of commercial success was garnered from releases by such artists as David Kramer, Robin Auld and later the neo-traditional African band Amampondo. This success was partly due to the label's involvement in the live presentation of these artists.

From the label's outset through to the early 1990s, the state-owned radio and TV media, SABC, restricted their stations from playing certain music by Kramer, Edi Niederlander, Coenie de Villiers and others because of the critical text in the songs by these performers on records released by Mountain Records.

From 1996, the label set up a European base, with an office in Hamburg, Germany. The label continued to market their own artists but also facilitated the release or distribution of non-label South African acts such as Brenda Fassie, Philip Tabane and the Soul Brothers.

The artists Tony Bird (Malawi/USA), Janvier Honfo (Benin) and Celso Fonseca (Brazil), all in some way connected by Africa and its music, were released on the label through the European offices. A sub-label, known as Sea Records, was launched in about 1989 to release jazz productions and several South African and German jazz ensembles had their music issued on this sister label.

The label still maintained an office in Cape Town until 2022 after which all business was directed from Hamburg, Germany. Releases in the period 2000 to 2010 include a DVD of the original Amampondo line-up performing live, and the re-issue of a jazz album by saxophonist classic Morris Goldberg and the third part in the label's Cape Jazz series.

Former Amampondo leader Dizu Plaatjies has three solo projects on the label. The second solo album by Plaatjies, entitled African Kings, was launched in Paris and Cape Town in February and March 2009 respectively. The CDs were distributed by EMI and Universal Music in southern Africa and New Music Distribution, Membran, Xango, Discovery and L'Autre, in Europe.

Mountain Records have won numerous awards with their artists. These include Sarie Awards, Scotty Awards, SA Music Awards (ASAMI) and most recently the SAMA Awards for the aforementioned "African Kings" release in 2009 and Plaatjies' "Ubuntu" released in 2015.

In the period after 2010 the label scaled back productions, as did many other labels, but continued a modest output which included re-issues of back catalogue in the digital sphere. A new CD album highlight included a special release of the label's jazz project from The Cape Jazz Band (CJB), led by veteran Cape based drummer, Jack Momple. The album entitled, Musical Democracy garnered high critical acclaim and revived the fortunes and moral of the label somewhat.

In October 2015, Plaatjies released the aforementioned album, a collaboration with South African and French artists, once again produced by label owner, Lee-Thorp. It was released under the banner, Dizu Plaatjies and Friends entitled, Ubuntu - The Common String. The album has attracted considerable media interest and entered the International World Music charts, where it stayed for four months climbing to position six.

Following the 2013 CJB release a special solo piano jazz project was released in 2018. It is entitled, Cape Jazz Piano which features six of the big names in the genre performing some of the classic repertoire in Cape Jazz. The record included two relative newcomers to the genre, pianists Kyle Shepherd and Ramon Alexander.

This world music Mountain label should not be confused with a British record label of the same name, believed to have been started by Bill Fehilly, manager of Nazareth, who died in a plane crash in the Scottish Borders, near Moffat, in July 1976. Between 1975 and 1980, the UK label released material by Nazareth, the Sensational Alex Harvey Band, Martyn Ford Orchestra and Voyager, and was distributed successively by EMI, Phonogram and RCA. There is no evidence that it is associated with the aforementioned like named label. Internet searches in 2011 turned up numerous record labels incorporating "mountain" in their names.

Interviewed in 2000, label management of the African company stated that they were not aware of the existence of the UK-based label until several years into business, by which time the name had established itself substantially in the World Music field, having appeared in African and European world music charts a number of times with Amampondo, Celso Fonseca, Cape Jazz (a compilation) and Jean Bosco Mwenda.

== See also ==
- List of record labels
