= African Studies Quarterly =

- Discipline: African studies
- Language: English

Publication details
- History: 1997
- Publisher: Center for African Studies, University of Florida (United States)
- Frequency: Quarterly
- Open access: yes

Standard abbreviations
- ISO 4: Afr. Stud. Q.

Indexing
- ISSN: 1093-2658

Links
- Journal homepage

African Studies Quarterly is a peer-reviewed electronic academic journal published quarterly by the Center for African Studies at the University of Florida in Gainesville, Florida, USA. The journal is indexed by the Public Affairs Information Service (PAIS) and by the Gale Group.
