= Winston Mankunku Ngozi =

South African tenor saxophone player

Winston Monwabisi "Mankunku" Ngozi (21 June 1943 – 13 October 2009) was a famous South African tenor saxophone player.

== Early life ==
He was born in Retreat, Western Cape, on 21 June 1943, the first child in a musical family. He played piano at the age of seven, and later clarinet and trumpet. In his mid-teens he learned the alto and tenor saxophone. He cites John Coltrane, local saxophonist "Cups & Saucers", pianist Merton Barrow, as well as bassist Midge Pike as major influences.

== Career ==
Mankunku chose to remain in his native Cape Town during apartheid. This meant that he was subjected to the Separate Amenities Act and similar apartheid legislation. A classic tale tells of his performance with an all-white big band in the Cape Town City Hall in 1964, where, because a mixed-race band was unlawful, he was forced to play behind a curtain so as to remain out of sight.

In 1968 he recorded the famous blockbuster "Yakhal' Inkomo", with Early Mabuza, Agrippa Magwaza and Lionel Pillay. It won him the Castle Lager "Jazz Musician of the Year" award for 1968. Another colleague was Abdullah Ibrahim.

== Death ==
He died on 13 October 2009 after a long struggle with illness.

== Discography ==
- Yakhal’ Inkomo (1968, with Lionel Pillay, Agrippa Magwaza, Early Mabuza)
- The Bull and The Lion (1976, with Mike Makhalemele, Trevor Rabin, Ronnie Robot and Neil Cloud)
- Winston Mankunku & Mike Perry Jika (1987, with Richard Pickett, Mike Campbell, Bheki Mseleku, Russell Herman, Claude Deppa, Lucky Ranku)
- Winston Mankunku & Mike Perry Dudula (1996, with Spencer Mbadu, Richard Pickett, Errol Dyers, Charles Lazar, Buddy Wells, Marcus Wyatt, Graham Beyer, The Merton Barrow String Quintet)
- Molo Africa (1997–1998, with Feya Faku, Tete Mbambisa, Errol Dyers, Basil Moses, Lionel Beukes and Vusi Khumalo)
- Abantwana be Afrika (2003, with Andile Yenana, Herbie Tsoaeli, Prince Lengoasa and Lulu Gontsana)
