= Basil Coetzee =

South African musician (1944–1998)

Background information
- Also known as: Manenberg
- Born: 2 February 1944; District Six, Cape Town, South Africa
- Died: 11 March 1998 (aged 54)
- Genres: Jazz
- Instrument: Saxophone
- Formerly of: Abdullah Ibrahim

Basil "Manenberg" Coetzee (2 February 1944 – 11 March 1998) was a South African musician, perhaps best known as a saxophonist. A leading figure in Cape Jazz, he is best known for his collaboration with the pianist Abdullah Ibrahim and for his contribution to the album Mannenberg, which has become a cultural symbol of resistance to apartheid.

== Biography ==
=== Childhood ===
Basil Coetzee was born in the multicultural District Six neighbourhood of Cape Town, South Africa. A self-taught musician, he learnt to play the penny-whistle, the drums, the flute and then the tenor saxophone – the instrument with which his name would become associated. The forced evictions of the District Six population following the implementation of the Group Areas Act forced his family to move to the coloured township of Manenberg in 1969.

=== Career and anti-apartheid activism ===
In the 1960s and 1970s, whilst jazz musicians such as Hugh Masekela, Abdullah Ibrahim, Chris McGregor, Dudu Pukwana, Johnny Dyani, and Louis Moholo were choosing exile due to the repression of the apartheid regime, Coetzee remained in South Africa and continued his career despite financial difficulties, working in a factory to support himself.

In 1974, he took part in the recording of the album Mannenberg – Is Where It’s Happening with Abdullah Ibrahim. The album contains the song which became an immense popular success and one of the unofficial anthems of the anti-apartheid movement. It also impressed musicians as the recording is reputed to have been made in just one take. The nickname ‘Manenberg’ has been associated with him ever since. Abdullah Ibrahim is quoted by the BBC as saying, "Even Basil himself said that in later years he would use that solo as a study exercise. We also use it now in our teaching as a required solo that young musicians have to play." The composition "Manenberg" became a South African jazz classic, and is also internationally renowned (indeed, a visit to the Cape Town waterfront will still today reward the jazz enthusiast with the "Manenberg" jazz venue).

During the 1980s, Coetzee performed at events organised by the United Democratic Front (UDF). In 1986, he founded the band Sabenza with Paul Abrahams, James Kibby and Vic Higgins. The following year, the group took part in the Culture in Another South Africa (CASA) festival, organised in Amsterdam by the African National Congress and the Dutch government.

From 1988 onwards, he toured Europe and recorded several albums, notably *Sabenza* and *Monwabisi*. He collaborated regularly with Abdullah Ibrahim following the latter’s return from exile and helped found the Musical Action for People’s Power (MAPP) music school in Cape Town. After Abdullah Ibrahim’s return from exile, Coetzee played regularly in Ibrahim’s various bands. At the same time, the band Sabenza remained active on the local scene.

B: was Coetzee's third solo album, released at about the time of his death in March 1998. This album contains some of his best work and includes contributions from players who worked with him for many years.

=== Style ===
Basil Coetzee contributed to the emergence of a South African jazz that blended American hard bop with the traditional rhythms of marabi and kwela. It was this blend that gave South African jazz much of its distinctive sound and its lively, assertive character. And it was precisely this assertiveness and this blend of influences that the apartheid government detested. Mountain Records, which would be his label throughout his career, describes Coetzee thus:

"His distinctive raunchy tenor sound and the untiring commitment to his cultural roots made him one of the best known jazzmen to come out of South Africa. He earned the nickname "Manenberg" after the hugely successful collaboration with Dollar Brand in the late seventies. Basil toured and recorded extensively with Brand (Abdullah Ibrahim). Together with Robbie Jansen they created the unique brass sound of the group The Pacific Express inspiring many younger cape jazz musicians in Cape Town".

An article in The Scotsman records that "Coetzee developed a soulful, gospel-influenced instrumental voice which had a raw, impassioned urgency at its core. He often explained that his sound was reflection of the life around him, a product of the fact that 'there's a lot of poverty in the townships, and people are frustrated, and my sound is created within that environment.'"

=== Death ===
Basil Coetzee died during the night of 11 March 1998, after a long struggle with cancer, survived by five children and six grandchildren. His funeral took place on Saturday 14 March 1998 in Mitchell's Plain, and he is buried in the Garden of Eden in Ottery. Abdullah Ibrahim was one of those who paid tribute to Basil's memory at his funeral, announcing plans for the establishment of a Basil Manenberg Coetzee Music Academy in his memory. Coetzee's son, Basil Coetzee, Jr., played saxophone in the service.

== Albums ==
Basil Coetzee's recording years spanned 1962–97, playing both tenor saxophone and flute. He has 18 recording sessions to his name, but his own compositions appear only on his Mountain Records releases. These albums include:

- Sabenza MOU522 - 1988
- Monwabisi MOU592 - 1993
- B: MOU7522 - 1998
- Passport - The Best of Basil Coetzee - 2014 (Digital only)
