= The Jazz Epistles =

South African bebop band

The Jazz Epistles were South Africa's first important (albeit short-lived) bebop band. Inspired by Art Blakey's Jazz Messengers, its members included Dollar Brand (later known as Abdullah Ibrahim) on piano, Kippie Moeketsi on alto saxophone, Jonas Gwangwa on trombone, Hugh Masekela on trumpet, Johnny Gertze on bass, and Early Mabuza or Makaya Ntshoko on drums. The group became famous after performing in the jam sessions called Jazz at the Odin in the Odin Theater in Sophiatown.

The group was formed in the mid-1950s when Brand and Mackay Davashe began working together initiated a collaboration with Gwangwa and Masekela.

In 1959 just before breaking up, the Jazz Epistles recorded the first album by a black South African band, Jazz Epistle, Verse 1. That same year, composer Todd Matshikiza's musical King Kong became a hit in Johannesburg. It used a jazz score to tell the tragic story of South African heavyweight boxer Ezekiel "King Kong" Dhlamini. Miriam Makeba, members of the Manhattan Brothers, and the Jazz Epistles musicians were involved in the production.

The 1960 Sharpeville Massacre marked the beginning of an era of vicious apartheid and greater repression of African culture. After the Sharpeville incident, the government imposed a State of Emergency, made mass arrests, issued thousands of bannings, and put activists who challenged apartheid laws on trial. The repression extended to African arts. Jazz was an expressive force seeking musical and social equality. The apartheid system could not tolerate it. Performances were not allowed, jazz was prohibited from radio broadcasts, and prominent musicians were threatened.

When the producers of King Kong received invitations to perform in Europe, the South African government, believing the musical would be helpful propaganda, issued passports to African performers who otherwise would not have had opportunities to leave the country. Members of Jazz Epistles welcomed the opportunity. Most of them found the freedom and the contacts with other musicians in Europe irresistible and chose exile over returning. Thus many of the most adventurous strains in South African music were pursued outside its borders for several decades.

Following a 56-year hiatus, in June 2016 several members of the Jazz Epistles played two reunion concerts in Johannesburg. In 2017–18 they played several concerts in North America and Europe, including San Sebastian (Spain) Jazz Festival on 25 July; Berlin on 4 August and Ann Arbor on 13 April 2018.
