= Stanley Glasser =

South African-born British composer (1926–2018)

- Born: 28 February 1926; Johannesburg, South Africa
- Died: 5 August 2018 (aged 92); England
- Education: King's College, Cambridge
- Occupations: Composer and academic

Stanley "Spike" Glasser (28 February 1926 – 5 August 2018), was a South African-born British composer and academic who settled in Britain in 1963.

== Biography ==
Born on 28 February 1926 in Johannesburg, South Africa, the elder son of first-generation Jewish immigrants from Lithuania, he first came to the UK in 1950 to study with Benjamin Frankel and (from 1952) Mátyás Seiber, then read music at King's College Cambridge (1955–1958). Returning to South Africa, he became a music lecturer at Cape Town University for four years.

In 1959, he was the musical director of King Kong by Todd Matshikiza and Harry Bloom, based on the life of boxer Ezekiel Dlamini. It was a big hit in South Africa, and was billed at the time as an "all-African jazz opera". In 1961, Glasser composed South Africa's first full-length ballet score, The Square. In 1962, Glasser also composed a musical, Mr Paljas, with lyrics by Harry Bloom, and although it was less successful, a cast recording was made. However, Glasser was forced to flee South Africa's apartheid regime in 1963 due to his relationship with black jazz singer Maud Damons (who had been in the cast of Mr Paljas).

Glasser quickly joined the staff at Goldsmiths, University of London, teaching evening classes. He was appointed full-time lecturer in 1966, and then head of music from 1969. In the 1980s, he was Dean of Humanities, becoming Professor of Music in 1990.

He was deeply influenced by his ethnomusicological investigations of native African music. His ethnomusicological field research is now held at the British Library. Glasser was arguably South Africa's first composer of electronic music, thanks to a 1960 performance of the Eugene O'Neill play The Emperor Jones in Johannesburg for which he wrote incidental electronic music. His visionary interest in all areas of contemporary musical development led to his department being a pioneer in the exploration of electronic music, and the Goldsmiths music studio purchased one of the first Fairlight CMI sampling systems to find its way to Britain. The electronic music studio is named in honour of Professor Glasser.

His compositions span musicals and incidental music for the theatre, comic opera, concert music and educational music, as well as commercial music. The King's Singers performed and what became his most famous piece, Lalela Zulu. They also recorded his Lamentations in 1994. Other works include the choral cantata Zonkizizwe in 1991, a Magnificat & Nunc dimittis for the Choir of St George's Chapel, Windsor, in 1998, and Bric-à-brac, a series of short pieces for piano written between 1985 and 2000, performed by Andrew Ball.

In 1995, Glasser also compiled and presented a 52-part weekly radio series for Classic FM, The A-Z of Classical Music, which was also published in book form.

== Selected works ==
- Sinfonietta Concertante for orchestra (1952)
- The Vision of Nongquise for chorus and orchestra (1953)
- The Emperor Jones, electronic incidental music (1959)
- The Square, ballet (1961)
- Mr Paljas, musical (1962)
- The Chameleon and the Lizard, choral cantata (1970), words by Lewis Nkosi.
- Serenade for piano and 11 instruments (1974)
- The Gift, comic opera (1976)
- Lalela Zulu (Listen to Things Zulu), for vocal ensemble (1977), words by Lewis Nkosi.
- Exiles, five songs for tenor and harpsichord, words Adolph Wood (1981)
- Memories of Love, seven songs for counter tenor and arch lute (1983)
- Lament for orchestra (1984)
- "Week End Music for saxophone quartet (1987)
- The Ward, song cycle for mezzo soprano & double reed octet (1984), words by Brian Trowell).
- Piano Concerto (1993)
- Lamentations for vocal ensemble (1994)
- Magnificat & Nunc dimittis (1998)
- Ezra, biblical drama (1999)
- A Greenwich Symphony for treble voices, choir and orchestra (1999)

== Selected recordings ==
- Lalela Zulu - Kings Singers Street Songs (RCA Victor Red Seal, 1998).
