= Gideon Nxumalo =

South African musician (1929–1970)

Gideon "Mgibe" Nxumalo [nkǁɔˈmalɔ] (15 June 1929 in Kimberley, Cape Province – 24 December 1970) was a South African jazz pianist and marimba player, acclaimed also as a composer and arranger. Nxumalo has been hailed as "perhaps one of South Africa's greatest unsung musical and cultural heroes."

== Life ==
Nxumalo graduated from university with training in classical music, playing the clarinet, viola, guitar, and drums. He specialized in swing, helping to pioneer this new direction in music. Both his mother and father played the piano, his father taught him how to play SABC Radio jingles as a young boy. He received formal training in classical music at the University of Roma in Lesotho. Under the name "Mgibe", as he was known by admirers, Nxumalo was, from the early 1950s, host to a radio programme This is Bantu Jazz for the South African Broadcasting Corporation (SABC). Nxumalo secured the job at SABC as the presenter of the show was looking for a young intern that was able to write and type. Rising up the ranks to become an announcer on This is Bantu Jazz, Nxumalo popularised local indigenous music on the radio, most notably Mbaqanga. Nxumalo was also key to the orchestration of the legendary productions ‘King Kong’ and later ‘Sponono’.

In the wake of the Sharpeville massacre, his declared political commitment was to lose him his position at the SABC. At Dorkay House in Johannesburg, Nxumalo taught piano and music theory. He was also active as a writer, inter alia for the stage, as visual artist and as actor. In 1958-59 he was a member of the Philip Tabane Quartet; also appearing with Dorothy Masuka and the Manhattan Brothers. Producing two jazz records, Nxumalo's compositions brought together diverse musical styles including swing, Big Band and elements of indigenous African song and rhythm. Nxumalo also composed a String Quartet, works for Chamber Orchestra, musicals, jingles and musical themes. He arranged African songs for the musical Sponono (script by Alan Paton and Krishna Shah), produced at the Cort Theatre on Broadway in 1964.

Sponono was the first South African production to play on Broadway. A jazz score composed by Gideon Nxumalo with Max Roach featured in the film Dilemma which was shot secretly by Henning Carlsen in 1962 in South Africa under apartheid. Nxumalo's celebrated Jazz Fantasia, in an arrangement by Denzil Weale for symphony orchestra and big band, and commissioned by Music is a great investment - MIAGI, was performed in 2009 by the MIAGI Youth Orchestra in concerts in South Africa and on tour in Germany.

== Jazz Fantasia ==
Along with Chris McGregor, Gideon Nxumalo helped pioneer the pre-exile South African jazz sound. His 1962 album ‘Jazz Fantasia’ is widely regarded as a seminal South African jazz record. In 1963 he followed this album up with ‘Jazz: the African Sound’. The album fused indigenous African instruments into its sound, such as the Chopi timbila (today known as the marimba). This gave way to a new and elaborate post-bepop jazz sound. The record featured legendary jazz altoists Kippie Moeketsi and Dudu Pukwana. Moeketsi was a colossal South African jazz figure during this time, and ‘Jazz Fantasia’ signalled Moeketsi's last commercial success before his struggles with alcohol and depression took their toll. The album was recorded at the Great Hall at Wits University in September 1962. It was commissioned by the university as part of an arts festival. With a limited pressing at the time, the album has become a revered foundation of modern South African jazz music, even though it is a rare album to find. Archivist Rob Allingham found an original at Gallo Music, and re-released a limited edition in 1991. The album is only a half-hour long work split into three acts. The acts are prefaced by the tracks Isinto, Chopi Chopsticks and Split Soul respectively.

== Works ==
- Jazz Fantasia with Martin Mgjima, Kippie Moeketsi, Dudu Pukwana, Makaya Ntshoko (1962)
- Gideon Plays with Mackay Davashe, Denny Nene, Gordon Mjandu, Maurice NTO Mgudlwa (1968)

== See also ==
- Kippie Moeketsi
- Sophiatown
