= Good News from Africa =

Album by Abdullah Ibrahim (Dollar Brand) and Johnny Dyani

Studio album by Abdullah Ibrahim (Dollar Brand) and Johnny Dyani
- Released: 1974
- Recorded: December 10, 1973
- Studio: Tonstudio Bauer, Ludwigsburg, Germany
- Genre: Jazz
- Length: 44:14
- Label: Cameo Records; 102; Enja; ENJ-2048
- Producer: Beat Burri

Abdullah Ibrahim chronology
Ode to Duke Ellington (1974)	Good News from Africa (1974)	Memories (1974)

Johnny Dyani chronology
Music for Xaba (1973)	Good News from Africa (1974)	Songs for Mbizo (1976)

Enja cover

Good News from Africa is an album of duets by pianist Abdullah Ibrahim, then known as Dollar Brand, and double bassist Johnny Dyani. It was recorded on 10 December 1973, at Tonstudio Bauer in Ludwigsburg, Germany, and was released in 1974 by the Swiss Cameo label and the German Enja label. The album features a blend of traditional African pieces and originals by Ibrahim.

== Reception ==
Professional ratings
Review scores
Source	Rating
AllMusic	4.5/5 stars
The Penguin Guide to Jazz	3.5/4 stars
The Rolling Stone Jazz & Blues Album Guide	3.5/5 stars
The Virgin Encyclopedia of Jazz	3/5 stars

In a review for AllMusic, Brian Olewnick called the album "one of the single most beautiful recordings of the '70s", and wrote: "The duo mix in traditional African and Islamic songs and perform with a fervor and depth of feeling rarely heard in or outside of jazz... the rich, sonorous approach of these two musicians is evident, both singing in stirring fashion... Good News from Africa was the shining, transcendent release by both of these great musicians and one that should grace every listener's collection."

The authors of The Penguin Guide to Jazz Recordings described the music as "fascinating and often moving duos, which move between a dark, almost tragic pessimism to a shouting, joyous climax."

Percy Mabandu of New Frame noted that the album is "as much a personal celebration of newly found faith as it is an exploration of the complexity of identity in the area," and remarked: "The music they created mixes Islamic nasheeds, traditional African songs and expressions of early Africanist Christianity... Ibrahim and Dyani's historic record is an emblem of music in service to ideas beyond itself."

Ethnomusicologist Carol Ann Muller stated that the album "conveys a complex, profound, and deeply moving story about contemporary forms of diaspora in the call-and-response, overlapping cries of these two exiled musicians in the non-European languages of Xhosa and Arabic."

== Track listing ==
1. "Ntsikana's Bell" (Traditional) – 6:15
2. "Msunduza" (Dollar Brand) – 4:37
3. "Good News: Swazi / Waya-Wa-Egoli" (Dollar Brand) – 7:25
4. "Adhan & Allah-O-Akbar" (Traditional) – 4:15
5. "The Pilgrim" (Dollar Brand) – 9:50
6. "Moniebah / The Pilgrim" (Dollar Brand) – 12:00

== Personnel ==
- Abdullah Ibrahim (Dollar Brand) – piano, vocals, flute
- Johnny Dyani – double bass, vocals, bells
