= Blues for a Hip King =

1989 album release by Abdullah Ibrahim

Compilation album by Abdullah Ibrahim
- Released: October 1989
- Genre: Jazz
- Label: Kaz

Abdullah Ibrahim chronology
Mindif (1988)	Blues for a Hip King (1989)	African River (1989)

Blues for a Hip King is a jazz compilation album by South African artist Abdullah Ibrahim, released in October 1989. The recordings are from several sessions in 1974, 1976 and 1979. The album was first released under the name Dollar Brand, and its title refers to King Sobhuza II of Swaziland, to whom the track "Blues for a Hip King" was dedicated.

== Track listing ==
1. "Ornette's Cornet" - 5:23
2. "All Day & All Night Long" - 5:28
3. "Sweet Basil Blues" - 6:21
4. "Blue Monk" (Monk) - 6:06
5. "Tsakwe Here Comes the Postman" - 11:45
6. "Blues for a Hip King" - 9:47
7. "Blues for B" - 3:27
8. "Mysterioso" (Monk) - 4:41
9. "Just You, Just Me" (Greer, Klages) - 4:59
10. "Eclipse at Dawn" - 4:02
11. "King Kong" (Todd Matshikiza) - 5:24
12. "Khumbula Jane" - 5:55

== Personnel ==
- Abdullah Ibrahim (aka Dollar Brand) (Piano)
- Kippie Moeketsi (Alto Saxophone) - 4
- Basil Coetzee (Tenor Saxophone, Flute) - 1–6
- Duku Makasi (Tenor Saxophone) - 4
- Sipho Gumede (Double Bass) - 4
- Gilbert Mathews (Drums) - 4
- Robbie Jansen (Alto Saxophone) - 1,2
- Arthur Jacobs (Tenor Saxophone) - 1,2
- Lionel Beukes (Fender Bass) - 1–3,5,6
- Nazier Kapdi (Drums) - 1,2
- Blue Mitchell (Trumpet and Flugelhorn) - 3,5,6
- Buster Cooper (Trombone) - 3,5,6
- Doug Sydes (Drums) - 3,5,6
