= Makaya Ntshoko =

South African drummer (1939–2024)

- Born: Makaya Ntshoko; October 29, 1939; Cape Town, South Africa
- Died: August 27, 2024 (aged 84)
- Genres: jazz
- Occupation: drummer
- Instrument: drums
- Years active: 1950s–2024

Makaya Ntshoko (29 October 1939 – 27 August 2024) was a South African drummer.

== Biography ==
Makaya Ntshoko was born in Cape Town, South Africa, on 29 October 1939. He grew up in Langa.

He played with Dollar Brand's trio in 1958, and recorded in a sextet with Hugh Masekela and John Mehegan in 1959. He performed on The Jazz Epistles album, Jazz Epistle: Verse 1. After the breakup of the group, Ntshoko founded The Jazz Giants with Kippie Moeketsi, Dudu Pukwana, Gideon Nxumalo, and Martin Mgijima. Ntshoko left South Africa in 1962, moving to Switzerland and playing with Johnny Gertze and Dollar Brand at the Club Africana in Zurich from 1963 to 1965. He later settled in Basel.

Following Brand's move to New York City, Ntshoko played in Copenhagen (1966, 1969–70) and recorded with Stuff Smith (1967), Benny Bailey (1968), Dexter Gordon (1968–69), and Ben Webster (1969). He embarked on a tour of the United States and the Bahamas in the early 1970s. He and Masekela recorded again in 1972. In 1974, he founded Makaya and the Tsotsis with Heinz Sauer, Bob Degen, and Isla Eckinger (later replaced by Jürgen Wuchner). Concomitantly, Ntshoko played in Nicra with Nick Evans and Radu Malfatti. In 1975, he appeared alongside Joe McPhee and Pepper Adams at the Willisau Jazz Festival. He collaborated with Mal Waldron (1977–79) and Johnny Dyani (1978).

Ntshoko died on 27 August 2024, at the age of 84.

== Discography ==
=== As leader or co-leader ===
- Makaya & the Tsotsis with Heinz Sauer, Bob Degen, Isla Eckinger (Enja, 1974)
- Happy House (SteepleChase, 2008)

=== As sideman ===
With Pepper Adams

- Twelfth & Pingree (Enja, 1975)
- Julian (Enja, 1976)

With Dollar Brand

- Duke Ellington Presents the Dollar Brand (Reprise, 1961)
- Dollar Brand Plays Sphere Jazz (Continental, 1962)
- Anatomy of a South African Village (Fontana, 1965)
- The Dream Trio (Freedom, 1979)
- Round Midnight at the Montmartre (Black Lion, 1988)
- Blues for a Hip King (Kaz, 1988)

With Johnny Dyani

- Song for Biko (SteepleChase, 1979)
- Grand Mother's Teaching (Disques Jam, 1982)

With Hugh Masekela

- Home Is Where the Music Is (Blue Thumb, 1972)
- The African Connection (MCA, 1980)

With Joe McPhee

- The Willisau Concert (Hat Hut, 1976)

With Marvin Peterson

- In Antibes (Enja, 1977)
- Tribute (Baystate, 1979)

With Mal Waldron

- One-Upmanship (Enja, 1977)
- Moods (Enja, 1978)

With Ben Webster

- Ben Webster Plays Ballads (Storyville, 1988)
- Plays Duke Ellington (Storyville, 1988)

With others

- Benny Bailey, Soul Eyes (SABA, 1968)
- Sathima Bea Benjamin, A Morning in Paris (Enja, 1997)
- Bob Degen, Sequoia Song (Enja, 1976)
- Dexter Gordon, Stella by Starlight (SteepleChase, 2005)
- Keith Jarrett, Charles Lloyd, Dollar Brand, Michael White, Europa Jazz (Europa Jazz, 1981)
- Jazz Epistles, Jazz Epistle Verse 1 (Continental, 1960)
- Gideon Nxumalo, Jazz Fantasia (Renown, 1962)
- Stuff Smith, Hot Violins (Storyville, 1991)
- John Tchicai, Irene Schweizer, Willi the Pig: Live at the Willisau Jazz Festival (Willisau Live, 1976)

== Sources ==
- Lars Rasmussen, "Makaya Ntshoko". Grove Dictionary of Jazz online.
