= Water from an Ancient Well =

1986 studio album by pianist Abdullah Ibrahim

Studio album by Abdullah Ibrahim
- Released: 1986
- Recorded: October 1985
- Studio: Van Gelder Studio, Englewood Cliffs, New Jersey
- Genre: Jazz
- Length: 46:27
- Label: BlackHawk
- Producer: Sathima Bea Benjamin

Abdullah Ibrahim chronology
Mannenberg–Is Where It's Happening	Water from an Ancient Well (1986)	South Africa (1986)

Professional ratings
Review scores
Source	Rating
AllMusic	5/5 stars
The Penguin Guide to Jazz	4/4 stars

Water from an Ancient Well is a jazz album by South African pianist Abdullah Ibrahim that was first released in 1986. In the review of the album for AllMusic, Scott Yanow wrote: "Many of the melodies (particularly 'Mandela,' 'Song for Sathima,' 'Water From an Ancient Well,' and the beautiful 'The Wedding') are among Ibrahim's finest compositions."

The album was also included in the book 1001 Albums You Must Hear Before You Die.

== Track listing ==
All tracks written by Ibrahim

1. "Mandela" - 4:58
2. "Song for Sathima" - 6:10
3. "Mannenberg Revisited (Cape Town Fringe)" - 6:09
4. "Tuang Guru" - 5:24
5. "Water from an Ancient Well" - 11:55
6. "The Wedding" - 2:38
7. "The Mountain" - 3:19
8. "Sameeda" - 5:56

== Personnel ==
- Abdullah Ibrahim – piano
- Carlos Ward – alto flute
- Ricky Ford – tenor sax
- Charles Davis – baritone sax
- David Williams – bass
- Ben Riley – drums
- Dick Griffin – trombone
