= Ancient Africa (disambiguation) =

Ancient Africa is the continent of Africa in ancient times, it may also refer to:

- Ancient Africa (album), a 1972 recording by Abdullah Ibrahim
- The area known as Africa in Classical Antiquity; see Africa (Roman province)
