= Yarona =

Yarona may refer to:

- Yarona (album), a 1995 album by Abdullah Ibrahim
- Yarona FM, a radio station based in Gaborone, Botswana
- Yarona, a bus rapid transit system in Rustenburg, South Africa
