= African Piano =

Live album by Abdullah Ibrahim
- Released: 1973
- Recorded: October 1969
- Venue: Jazzhus Montmartre, Copenhagen
- Genre: Jazz
- Label: JAPO

African Piano is a solo piano album by Abdullah Ibrahim, recorded in 1969. It was released on LP four years later and was first issued on CD in 1991.

== Recording and music ==
The album was recorded in concert at Jazzhus Montmartre in Copenhagen, in October 1969. The eight tracks on the album are all Ibrahim originals and are played as a continuous piece. This was Ibrahim's second solo piano album, after Reflections, from 1965.

== Releases ==
African Piano was released on LP on 1 March 1973 by JAPO Records, part of ECM Records. The first CD release was in 1991, by ECM. The label subsequently reissued it on CD as part of their Re:solutions series. The LP version was issued under the name Dollar Brand; reissues were attributed to Abdullah Ibrahim, after the pianist changed his name.

== Reception ==
Professional ratings
Review scores
Source	Rating
AllMusic	4/5 stars
The Penguin Guide to Jazz	4/4 stars
The Rolling Stone Jazz & Blues Album Guide	4.5/5 stars
The Virgin Encyclopedia of Jazz	3/5 stars

AllMusic summarized that "Ibrahim was still in the process of finding his own sound at the time, although his improvisations (which use repetition and vamps effectively) have their interesting moments." The Penguin Guide to Jazz commented that "the [1991] CD robs the music of some of its full-hearted resonance."

== Track listing ==
1. "Bra Joe from Kilimanjaro"
2. "Selby That the Eternal Spirit Is the Only Reality"
3. "The Moon"
4. "Xaba"
5. "Sunset in Blue"
6. "Kippy"
7. "Jabulani – Easter Joy"
8. "Tintiyana"

== Personnel ==
- Abdullah Ibrahim – piano
