= Abdullah Ibrahim =

South African pianist and composer (1934–2026)

Abdullah Ibrahim OIS
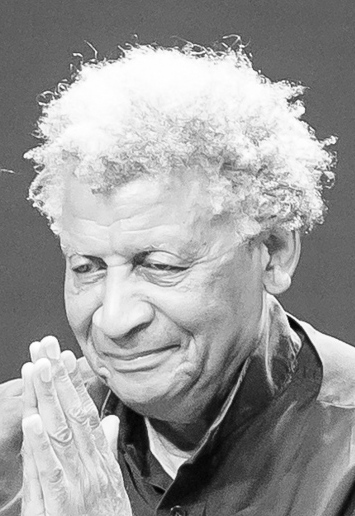
- Ibrahim in 2016

Background information
- Also known as: Dollar Brand
- Born: Adolph Johannes Brand; 9 October 1934; Cape Town, Cape, Union of South Africa
- Died: 15 June 2026 (aged 91) Prien am Chiemsee, Bavaria, Germany
- Genres: South African jazz, bebop, post-bop, folk
- Occupations: Musician, composer, bandleader
- Instruments: Piano, saxophone, cello
- Years active: 1955–2026
- Website: Abdullahibrahim.co.za
- Spouse: Sathima Bea Benjamin (m. 1965; died 2013)
- Children: 2; including Jean Grae

Abdullah Ibrahim (born Adolph Johannes Brand; 9 October 1934 – 15 June 2026), previously known as Dollar Brand, was a South African pianist and composer. His music reflects many of the musical influences of his childhood in the multicultural port areas of Cape Town, ranging from traditional African songs to the gospel of the AME Church and Ragas, to more modern jazz and other Western styles. Ibrahim is considered the leading figure in the subgenre of Cape jazz. Within jazz, his music particularly reflects the influence of Thelonious Monk and Duke Ellington. He is known especially for "Mannenberg", a jazz piece that became an anti-apartheid anthem.

During the apartheid era in the 1960s, Ibrahim moved to New York City and, apart from a brief return to South Africa in the 1970s, remained in exile until the early 1990s. Over the decades, he toured the world extensively, appearing at major venues either as a solo artist or playing with other renowned musicians, including Max Roach, Carlos Ward, and Randy Weston, as well as collaborating with classical orchestras in Europe.

With his wife, the jazz singer Sathima Bea Benjamin, Ibrahim was father to two children, including the New York underground rapper Jean Grae.

== Early life and national career ==
Ibrahim was born in Cape Town, South Africa, on 9 October 1934, and was baptized Adolph Johannes Brand. He attended Trafalgar High School in Cape Town's District Six, and began piano lessons at the age of seven, making his professional debut at 15. He was of mixed-race heritage, making him a Coloured person according to the apartheid system. His mother played piano in a church, the musical style of which would remain an influence on him; in addition, he learned to play several genres of music during his youth in Cape Town, including marabi, mbaqanga, and American jazz. He became well known in jazz circles in Cape Town and Johannesburg.

In 1959 and 1960, Ibrahim played with the Jazz Epistles group in Sophiatown, alongside saxophonists Kippie Moeketsi and Mackay Davashe, trumpeter Hugh Masekela, trombonist Jonas Gwangwa (who were all in the orchestra of the musical King Kong that opened in Johannesburg in February 1959), bassist Johnny Gertze and drummer Makaya Ntshoko; in January 1960, the six musicians went into the Gallo studio and recorded the first full-length jazz LP by Black South African musicians, Jazz Epistle Verse One, with 500 copies being produced. Although the group avoided explicitly political activity, the apartheid government was suspicious of it and other jazz groups, and targeted them heavily during the increase in state repression following the Sharpeville massacre in March 1960, and eventually, the Jazz Epistles broke up.

== Early international career ==
Ibrahim moved to Europe in 1962. In February 1963, his wife-to-be, Sathima Bea Benjamin (they married in 1965), convinced Duke Ellington, who was in Zürich, Switzerland, on a European tour, to come to hear Ibrahim perform as "The Dollar Brand Trio" in Zurich's "Africana Club". After the show, Ellington helped set up a recording session with Reprise Records: Duke Ellington presents The Dollar Brand Trio. Ibrahim subsequently played at many European festivals.

Ibrahim and Benjamin married and moved to New York in 1965 and that year Ibrahim played at the Newport Jazz Festival, followed by a first tour through the United States; in 1966, he substituted for Duke Ellington on five dates, leading the Duke Ellington Orchestra. In 1967, a Rockefeller Foundation grant enabled Ibrahim to study at the Juilliard School of Music in New York. While in the U.S., he interacted with many progressive musicians, among them Don Cherry, Ornette Coleman, John Coltrane, Pharoah Sanders, Cecil Taylor, and Archie Shepp. As the Black Power movement developed in the 1960s and 1970s, it influenced a number of Ibrahim's friends and collaborators, who began to see their music as a form of cultural nationalism. Ibrahim, in turn, began to incorporate African elements into his jazz.

== Return to South Africa ==
In 1968, Ibrahim briefly returned to Cape Town, where he converted to Islam that year (with the resultant change of name from Dollar Brand to Abdullah Ibrahim) and in 1970 he made a pilgrimage to Mecca.

He met Rashid Vally at the latter's Kohinoor record shop in Johannesburg in the early 1970s, and Vally produced two of Ibrahim's albums in the following years. The pair produced a third album in 1974, titled Underground in Africa, in which Ibrahim abandoned his financially unsuccessful folk-infused jazz of the previous albums. Instead, the new album was a fusion of jazz, rock music, and South African popular music, and sold well. While recording Underground, Ibrahim collaborated with Oswietie, a local band of which Robbie Jansen and Basil Coetzee were saxophonists, and who played a large role in creating the album's fusion style. After the success of Underground, Ibrahim asked Coetzee to bring together a supporting band for his next recording: the group Coetzee put together included Jansen, as well as others who had not worked on Underground. The composition "Mannenberg" was recorded in June 1974 during one of Ibrahim's visits back to South Africa, in a studio in Cape Town, and was produced by Rashid Vally. The track was recorded in one take during a period of collective improvisation. The piece was inspired by the Cape Flats township where many of those forcibly removed from District Six were sent.

The recordings made with Jansen and Coetzee, including "Mannenberg" (renamed "Capetown Fringe" for its United States release), "Black Lightning"; "African Herbs"; and "Soweto Is Where It Is At" – sounds that mirrored and spoke of the defiance in the streets and townships of South Africa – gave impetus to the genre of music known as "Cape Jazz." "Mannenberg" came to be considered "the unofficial national anthem" of South Africa, and the theme tune of the anti-apartheid movement. Saxophonist and flautist Carlos Ward was Ibrahim's sideman in duets during the early 1980s. A few years after the release of "Mannenberg" (released on Brand's 1974 album Mannenberg ~ 'Is Where It's Happening'), South African police fired upon protesting children during the Soweto Uprising that began on 16 June 1976; this event led Ibrahim and Benjamin to publicly express support for the African National Congress, which was still banned at the time, and to help organize an illegal benefit concert.

Soon afterwards returning to the United States and settling in New York, Ibrahim and Sathima founded the record company Ekapa (meaning "Cape Town" in Xhosa) in 1981.

Starting in 1983, Ibrahim led a group called Ekaya (which translates as "home"), as well as various trios, occasional big bands, and other special projects. Ibrahim returned to South Africa after Nelson Mandela convinced him to return in a 1990 meeting in Germany.

== Film and television work ==
Ibrahim wrote the soundtracks for a number of films, including Chocolat (1988), and No Fear, No Die (1990), both directed by Claire Denis.

On 25 November 1989, he made an extended appearance in the British Channel 4 television discussion series After Dark alongside Zoë Wicomb, Donald Woods, Shula Marks, and others. Ibrahim also took part in the 2002 documentary Amandla!: A Revolution in Four-Part Harmony, where he and others recalled the days of apartheid; the film's subtitle derives from observations made by Ibrahim.

Ibrahim is the subject of the documentaries A Brother with Perfect Timing (1987) and A Struggle for Love (2005, directed by Ciro Cappellari).

== Post-apartheid ==
Ibrahim worked as a solo performer, typically in unbroken concerts which echoed the unstoppable impetus of the old marabi performers, classical impressionists and snatches of his musical idols – Duke Ellington, Thelonious Monk and Fats Waller. Ibrahim also performed frequently with trios and quartets and larger orchestral units. Returning to South Africa in the early 1990s, he was feted with symphony orchestra performances, one of which was in honour of Nelson Mandela's 1994 inauguration as president. Mandela reportedly referred to him as "our Mozart".

In 1997, Ibrahim collaborated on a tour with drummer Max Roach, and the following year undertook a world tour with the Munich Radio Philharmonic Orchestra.

In 1999, Ibrahim founded the M7 academy for South African musicians in Cape Town and was the initiator of the Cape Town Jazz Orchestra, an 18-piece big band launched in September 2006.

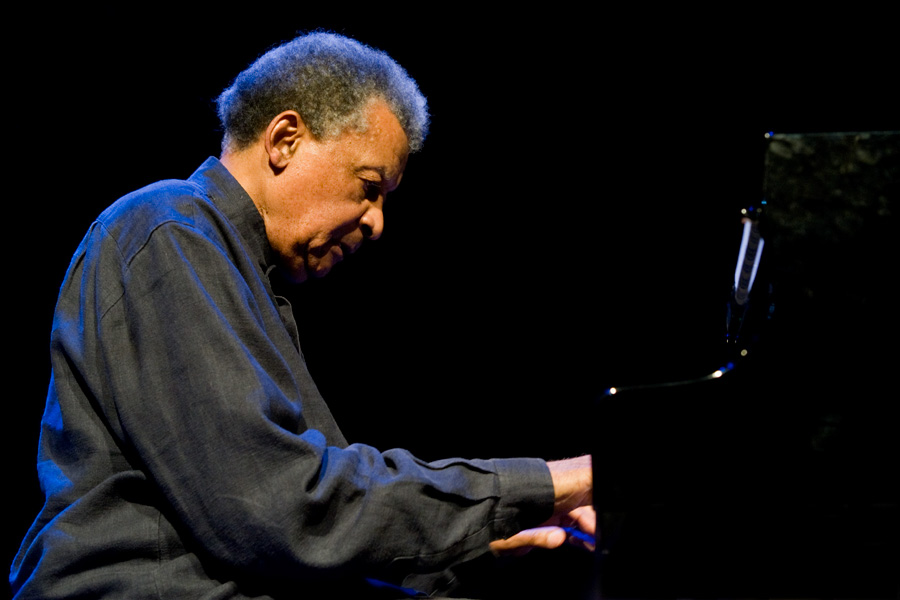
Ibrahim performing at the 2011 Moers Festival

Ibrahim continued to perform internationally, mainly in Europe, and with occasional shows in North America. Reviewing his 2008 concert at London's Barbican Centre – a "monumental" show with the BBC Big Band, featuring vocalists Ian Shaw and Cleveland Watkiss – John Fordham of The Guardian referred to "[Ibrahim's] elder-statesman status as the African Duke Ellington and Thelonious Monk combined (and his role as an educator and political campaigner)". He released the solo piano album Senzo, named after his father, in 2008.

In 2016, at Emperors Palace, Johannesburg, Ibrahim and Hugh Masekela performed together for the first time in 60 years, reuniting the Jazz Epistles in commemoration of the 40th anniversary of the historic 16 June 1976 Soweto youth demonstrations. In 2019, with his group Ekaya, he released The Balance, an album that DownBeat praised, noting that it "spans a wealth of sounds—big band, township music, solo piano ...In content and form, Ibrahim lingers between comfort and edge, pressure and ease."

Reviewing Ibrahim's July 2023 appearance with bassist Noah Jackson and flautist Cleave Guyton at the Barbican Centre in London, Kevin Le Gendre wrote: "Ibrahim's enduring love of the founding fathers of modern jazz is made clear from the outset as the trio starts with rhapsodic versions of two timeless anthems, Ellington's "In A Sentimental Mood" and Coltrane's "Giant Steps", while later on we are treated to a spirited take (on) Monk's 'Skippy'. But in the interim it is Ibrahim's originals that take pride of place, showing how, since the '60s, he has been creating standards of his own that vividly capture the poised dignity of African culture and customs."

His final album, 3, was released in 2024.

== Awards ==
In 2007, Ibrahim was presented with the South African Music Lifetime Achievement Award, given by the Recording Industry of South Africa, in a ceremony at the Sun City Superbowl.

In 2009, for his solo piano album Senzo he received the "Best Male Artist" award at the 15th Annual MTN South African Music Awards.

In 2009, the University of the Witwatersrand, Johannesburg, conferred on Ibrahim an Honorary Doctorate of Music. Also in 2009, he was awarded South Africa's national honour the Order of Ikhamanga (Silver), "For his excellent contribution to the arts, putting South Africa on the international map and his fight against racism and apartheid."

In July 2017, Ibrahim was honoured with the German Jazz Trophy.

In July 2018, the National Endowment for the Arts (NEA) announced Abdullah Ibrahim as one of four recipients of the NEA Jazz Masters Fellowships, to be celebrated in a concert on 15 April 2019 at the John F. Kennedy Center for the Performing Arts in Washington, DC. Awarded in recognition of lifetime achievement, the honour is bestowed on individuals who have made significant contributions to the art form, the other 2019 recipients being Bob Dorough, Maria Schneider, and Stanley Crouch.

"Mannenberg" was played at Zohran Mamdani's inauguration as mayor of New York City in 2026.

== Personal life and death ==
With his wife, the jazz singer Sathima Bea Benjamin, Ibrahim was father to New York underground rapper Jean Grae (Tsidi), and a son, Tsakwe, an artist.

Ibrahim died in Prien am Chiemsee, Bavaria, Germany, on 15 June 2026, at the age of 91, after a short illness. His partner Marina Umari said in tribute to him: "Abdullah passed away peacefully with South Africa and its people in his heart. His love for his country never wavered, no matter where in the world he found himself."

== Discography ==
An asterisk (*) indicates that the year is that of release.

=== As leader/co-leader ===
| Year recorded | Title | Label | Notes |
|---|---|---|---|
| 1960 | Jazz Epistle Verse 1 | Continental | As The Jazz Epistles; sextet, with Kippie Moeketsi (alto sax), Jonas Gwangwa (trombone), Hugh Masekela (trumpet), Johnny Gertze (bass), Makaya Ntshoko (drums) |
| 1960 | Dollar Brand Plays Sphere Jazz | Continental | Trio, with Johnny Gertze (bass), Makaya Ntshoko (drums) |
| 1963 | Duke Ellington Presents the Dollar Brand Trio | Reprise | Trio, with Johnny Gertze (bass), Makaya Ntshoko (drums) |
| 1965 | Reflections | Black Lion | Solo piano; also released as This Is Dollar Brand |
| 1965 | Round Midnight at the Montmartre | Black Lion | Most tracks trio, with Johnny Gertze (bass), Makaya Ntshoko (drums); two tracks solo piano |
| 1965 | The Dream | Freedom | Trio |
| 1965 | Anatomy of a South African Village | Black Lion | Trio, with Johnny Gertze (bass), Makaya Ntshoko (drums) |
| 1968 | The Dream | Jazz Music Yesterday | Trio, with Johnny Gertze (bass), Makaya Ntshoko (drums) |
| 1968 | Hamba Khale! | Togetherness | With Gato Barbieri; reissued as Confluence |
| 1969 | African Sketchbook | Enja | Most tracks solo piano; one track solo flute |
| 1969 | African Piano (Note: An album entitled African Piano was released by Sackville; it is a 1973 recording and contains two tracks from Sangoma and one from African Portraits.) | JAPO | Solo piano; in concert; released 1973 |
| 1970 | African Sun | Spectator | |
| 1971 | Peace | | |
| 1971 | Dollar Brand Trio with Kippie Moketsi | | |
| 1972 | Ancient Africa | JAPO | Mostly solo piano; one part solo flute; in concert; released 1974 |
| 1973 | African Portraits | Sackville | Solo piano |
| 1973 | Sangoma | Sackville | Solo piano |
| 1973 | Memories | Philips | Solo piano |
| 1973 | African Space Program | Enja | With Hamiet Bluiett (baritone sax), Roland Alexander (tenor sax, harmonica), John Stubblefield (tenor sax), Sonny Fortune and Carlos Ward (alto sax, flute), Cecil Bridgewater, Enrico Rava and Charles Sullivan (trumpet), Kiani Zawadi (trombone), Cecil McBee (bass), Roy Brooks (percussion) |
| 1973 | Ode to Duke Ellington | West Wind | Solo piano |
| 1973 | Good News from Africa | Enja | Duo, with Johnny Dyani (bass, bells) |
| 1973 | Boswell Concert 1973 | Colomba | With Bea Benjamin |
| 1974 | African Breeze | East Wind | Solo piano |
| 1974 | Underground in Africa | | |
| 1974 | Mannenberg – "Is Where It's Happening" | The Sun | Quintet with Basil Coetzee (tenor sax), Robbie Jansen (alto sax and flute), Paul Michaels (bass), Monty Weber (drums) – Reissued as Capetown Fringe by Chiaroscuro |
| 1975 | African Herbs | The Sun | one track trio, other two septet – Reissued as Soweto By Chiaroscuro |
| 1976 | Banyana – Children of Africa | Enja | Trio with Cecil McBee (bass) & Roy Brooks (drums); Ibrahim plays soprano sax and sings on one track |
| 1976 | Black Lightning | Chiaroscuro | With Basil Mannenberg Coetzee (tenor sax), others |
| 1977 | Cape Town Fringe | Chiaroscuro | With Paul Michaels (bass), Basil Coetzee (tenor sax & flute), Robbie Jansen (alto sax), and Monty Weber (drums) |
| 1977 | The Journey | Chiaroscuro | With Don Cherry (trumpet), Carlos Ward (alto sax), Talib Rhynie (alto sax, oboe), Hamiet Blueitt (baritone sax, clarinet), Johnny Dyani (bass), Ed Blackwell and Roy Brooks (drums), John Betsch and Claude Jones (percussion) |
| 1977 | Streams of Consciousness | Baystate | Duo, with Max Roach (drums) |
| 1977 | African Rhythm | | |
| 1978 | Anthem for the New Nations | Denon | Solo piano |
| 1978 | Duet | Denon | Duo, with Archie Shepp (tenor sax, alto sax, soprano sax) |
| 1978 | Autobiography | Plainisphare | Solo piano; in concert |
| 1978 | Nisa | African Violets | |
| 1979 | Echoes from Africa | Enja | Duo, with Johnny Dyani (bass) |
| 1979 | African Marketplace | Elektra | With 12-piece band |
| 1979 | Africa – Tears and Laughter | Enja | Quartet, with Talib Qadr (alto sax, soprano sax), Greg Brown (bass), John Betsch (drums); Ibrahim is also on vocals and soprano sax |
| 1980 | Dollar Brand at Montreux | Enja | Quintet, with Carlos Ward (alto sax, flute), Craig Harris (trombone), Alonzo Gardener (electric bass), André Strobert (drums); in concert |
| 1980 | Matsidiso | Pläne | Solo piano; in concert |
| 1980 | South Africa Sunshine | Pläne | Solo piano; Ibrahim adds vocals on some tracks; in concert |
| 1981 | Duke's Memories | Black & Blue | Quartet, with Carlos Ward (alto sax, flute), Rachim Ausur Sahu (bass), Andre Strobert (drums) |
| 1982 | African Dawn | Enja | Solo piano |
| 1982 | Jazzbühne Berlin '82 | Repertoire | Solo piano; in concert |
| 1983 | Ekaya | Ekapa | Septet, with Charles Davis (baritone sax), Ricky Ford (tenor sax), Carlos Ward (alto sax), Dick Griffin (trombone), Cecil McBee (bass), Ben Riley (drums) |
| 1983 | Zimbabwe | Enja | Quartet, with Carlos Ward (alto sax, flute), Essiet Okun Essiet (bass), Don Mumford (drums); Ibrahim also plays soprano sax |
| 1985 | Water from an Ancient Well | Tiptoe | Septet, with Carlos Ward (alto sax, flute), Dick Griffin (trombone), Ricky Ford (tenor sax), Charles Davis (baritone sax), David Williams (bass), Ben Riley (drums) |
| 1986 | South Africa | | With Carlos Ward (alto sax), Essiet Okun Essiet (bass), Don Mumford (drums), Johnny Classens (vocals); in concert |
| 1988 | Mindif | Enja | Recorded for the soundtrack to the film Chocolat |
| 1989 | African River | Enja | With John Stubblefield (tenor sax, flute), Horace Alexander Young (alto sax, soprano sax, piccolo), Howard Johnson (tuba, baritone sax, trumpet), Robin Eubanks (trombone), Buster Williams (bass), Brian Abrahams (drums) |
| 1990 | No Fear, No Die | Enja | Film soundtrack |
| 1991 | Mantra Mode | Enja | Septet, with Robbie Jansen (alto sax, baritone sax, flute), Basil Coetzee (tenor sax), Johnny Mekoa (trumpet), Errol Dyers (guitar), Spencer Mbadu (bass), Monty Webber (drums) |
| 1991 | Desert Flowers | | Solo piano |
| 1993 | Knysna Blue | Tiptoe | Solo piano and other instruments |
| 1995 | Yarona | Tiptoe | Trio, with Marcus McLaurine (bass), George Johnson (drums) |
| 1997 | Cape Town Flowers | Tiptoe | Trio, with Marcus McLaurine (bass), George Gray (drums) |
| 1997 | Cape Town Revisited | Tiptoe/Enja | Quartet, with Feya Faku (trumpet), Marcus McLaurine (bass), George Gray (drums) |
| 1997 | African Suite | | With Belden Bullock (bass), George Gray (drums), strings |
| 1998 | African Symphony | Enja | With orchestra |
| 1998 | Township One More Time | | Septet |
| 1998 | Voice of Africa | | |
| 2000 | Ekapa Lodumo | Tiptoe | With the NDR Big Band; in concert |
| 2001 | African Magic | Enja | Trio, with Belden Bullock (bass), Sipho Kunene (drums); in concert |
| 2008 | Senzo | Sunnyside | Solo piano |
| 2008 | Bombella | Sunnyside | With the WDR Big Band; in concert |
| 2010 | Sotho Blue | Sunnyside | With Jason Marshall (baritone sax), Keith Loftis (tenor sax), Cleave Guyton (alto sax, flute), Andrae Murchison (trombone), Belden Bullock (bass), George Gray (drums) |
| 2012–13 | Mukashi: Once Upon a Time | Sunnyside | Quartet, with Cleave Guyton (saxophone, flute, clarinet), Eugen Bazijan and Scott Roller (cello); Ibrahim is also on vocals and flute |
| 2014 | The Song Is My Story | Intuition/Sunnyside | Most tracks solo piano; two tracks saxophone |
| 2019 | The Balance | Gearbox | With Ekaya (Noah Jackson, Alec Dankworth, Will Terrill, Adam Glasser, Cleave Guyton Jr., Lance Bryant, Andrae Murchison, Marshall McDonald) |
| 2019 | Dream Time | Enja | Solo piano; in concert |
| 2020 | Solotude | Gearbox | Solo piano |
| 2023 | 3 | Gearbox | Trio; volume 2 in concert |

=== Compilations ===
| Year recorded | Title | Label | Notes |
|---|---|---|---|
| 1973 | African Piano | Sackville | Solo piano; two tracks from Sangoma; one from African Portraits; this is a different album from the 1969 recording of the same name |
| 1973 | Fats, Duke and the Monk | Sackville | Solo piano; one track from Sangoma; one track from African Portraits; one track previously unissued |
| 1983–85 | The Mountain | | Septets; complies tracks from Ekaya and Water from an Ancient Well |
| 1988* | Blues for a Hip King | | |
| 1973–97 | A Celebration | Enja | Released 2005 |
| | Re:Brahim: Abdullah Ibrahim Remixed | Enja | Remixes of Ibrahim performances; released 2005 |

=== As sideman ===
| Year recorded | Leader | Title | Label |
|---|---|---|---|
| 1966 | Elvin Jones | Midnight Walk | Atlantic |
| 1976 | Sathima Bea Benjamin | African Songbird | |
| 1977 | Buddy Tate | Buddy Tate Meets Dollar Brand | Chiaroscuro |

== See also ==
- History of South Africa (1948–1994)
