= Echoes from Africa =

1979 studio album by Abdullah Ibrahim and Johnny Dyani

Studio album by Abdullah Ibrahim and Johnny Dyani
- Released: 1979
- Recorded: September 7, 1979
- Studio: Tonstudio Bauer, Ludwigsburg, Germany
- Genre: Jazz
- Length: 31:45
- Label: Enja; ENJ-3047 2
- Producer: Horst Weber, Matthias Winckelmann

Abdullah Ibrahim chronology
Africa – Tears and Laughter (1979)	Echoes from Africa (1979)	Live at Montreux (1980)

Johnny Dyani chronology
Song for Biko (1979)	Echoes from Africa (1979)	African Bass (1980)

Alternate cover

Echoes from Africa is an album of duets by pianist Abdullah Ibrahim (Dollar Brand) and double bassist Johnny Dyani. It was recorded on 7 September 1979, at Tonstudio Bauer in Ludwigsburg, Germany, and was released later that year by Enja Records. The album features a traditional piece, a composition by Mackay Davashe, and two pieces by Ibrahim, one of which is dedicated to fellow pianist McCoy Tyner.

== Reception ==
Professional ratings
Review scores
Source	Rating
AllMusic	3/5 stars
The Penguin Guide to Jazz	4/4 stars
The Rolling Stone Jazz & Blues Album Guide	3.5/5 stars
The Virgin Encyclopedia of Jazz	3/5 stars

In a review for AllMusic, Scott Yanow called the album a "rather emotional" set by "two masterful musicians", and wrote: "This moody music has an almost sacred credibility and is quite personal."

The authors of The Penguin Guide to Jazz Recordings awarded the album a full 4 stars, describing the music as "fascinating and often moving duos, which move between a dark, almost tragic pessimism to a shouting, joyous climax."

Writing for Sandy Brown Jazz, Steve Day singled out "Zikr" for praise, stating that it "helped me realise it is possible to take strength from where you least expect to do so," and depicting it as a "passive siren song to the spirit of our common humanity, connected". He commented: "It is not just the voices of these two men, slowly singing with and to each other like old brothers, there is also that oh so stately piano and bowed double bass which come to the ears from an immeasurable depth. Like an aural meditation. It sounds as if Abdullah Ibrahim had finally found home again and there was Johnny Dyani wringing time and melody from the double bass to welcome him."

A writer for The Sunday Standard called the album an "old beautiful gem", and remarked: "It seems to me that once an artist reaches Dollar's level, every creation they bring to life is a masterpiece."

== Track listing ==
1. "Namhanje (Today)" (Traditional) – 16:54
2. "Lakutshonilanga (When the Sun Sets)" (Mackay Davashe) – 3:32
3. "Saud (Dedicated to McCoy Tyner)" (Abdullah Ibrahim) – 5:54
4. "Zikr (Remembrance of Allah)" (Abdullah Ibrahim) – 5:25

== Personnel ==
- Abdullah Ibrahim – vocals, piano
- Johnny Dyani – vocals, double bass
