= Cappellari =

Cappellari is a surname. Notable people with the surname include:

- Ciro Cappellari (born 1959), Argentine-German film director, cinematographer, and screenwriter
- Daniele Cappellari (born 1976), Italian racing driver
- Luca Cappellari (born 1963), Italian racing driver
- Pope Gregory XVI (1765–1846), born Bartolomeo Alberto Cappellari
