= Reflections (Abdullah Ibrahim album) =

1965 solo piano album by Abdullah Ibrahim

Studio album by Abdullah Ibrahim
- Recorded: March 1965
- Genre: Jazz
- Label: Black Lion

Reflections is a solo piano album recorded in 1965 by Abdullah Ibrahim (then known as Dollar Brand).

== Recording and music ==
The album was recorded in March 1965. It was Abdullah Ibrahim's first solo piano album.

== Release ==
Reflections was released by Black Lion Records. Ibrahim was still known as Dollar Brand, so it was under that name that the album was issued.

== Reception ==
Professional ratings
Review scores
Source	Rating
AllMusic	3/5 stars
The Penguin Guide to Jazz	3/4 stars

AllMusic put the recording in historical context: "These largely introspective performances do not contain the joyful folk melodies of Ibrahim's later work but they offer a fascinating early look into the music of the important stylist." The Penguin Guide to Jazz commented on the pianist's "drumming lyricism".

== Track listing ==
1. "Honeysuckle Rose" (Andy Razaf/Fats Waller) – 3:45
2. "Resolution" (Dollar Brand) – 3:43
3. "Knight's Night" (Brand) – 5:38
4. "Mood Indigo (Barney Bigard/Duke Ellington/Irving Mills)/Don't Get Around Much Anymore (Ellington/Bob Russell)/Take the 'A' Train" (Billy Strayhorn) – 8:34
5. "Monk's Mood" (Thelonious Monk) – 4:47
6. "You Are Too Beautiful" (Lorenz Hart/Richard Rodgers) – 6:10
7. "Little Niles" (Randy Weston) – 5:58
8. "Pye R Squared" (Brand) – 2:52
9. "On the Banks of Allen Waters" (Brand) – 5:39
10. "Reflections" (Thelonious Monk) – 4:06
11. "Which Way?" (Brand) – 3:09

== Personnel ==
- Abdullah Ibrahim – piano
