= African Dawn =

1982 album by Abdullah Ibrahim

Studio album by Abdullah Ibrahim
- Recorded: June 1982
- Genre: Jazz
- Length: 55:55
- Label: Enja

African Dawn is a solo piano album by Abdullah Ibrahim.

== Recording and music ==
Pianist Abdullah Ibrahim recorded the album in June 1982. It contains tributes to fellow musicians John Coltrane, Thelonious Monk, and Billy Strayhorn.

== Release and reception ==
Professional ratings
Review scores
Source	Rating
AllMusic	4/5 stars
The Penguin Guide to Jazz	3.5/4 stars

African Dawn was released by Enja Records. The AllMusic reviewer Scott Yanow commented that Ibrahim "displays his South African heritage and his optimistic view of the future in his unique brand of jazz. African Dawn is a fine example of his solo piano talents."

== Track listing ==
1. "Blues for a Hip King" – 5:43
2. "Sunshine of Your Smile" – 3:25
3. "African Dawn" – 6:27
4. "African Piano" – 6:42
5. "'Round Midnight" (Hanighen, Monk, Williams) – 5:26
6. "Just You, Just Me" (Greer, Klages) – 3:11
7. "Blue Monk" (Monk) – 4:17
8. "For Coltrane" – 7:19
9. "For Monk" – 4:38
10. "A Flower Is a Lovesome Thing" (Strayhorn) – 4:31
11. "Children's Corner" – 4:16

== Personnel ==
- Abdullah Ibrahim – piano
