= On Green Dolphin Street (Archie Shepp album) =

Studio album by Archie Shepp
- Released: 1978
- Recorded: November 28, 1977
- Studio: Sound Ideas Studios, New York City
- Genre: Jazz
- Length: 42:04
- Label: Denon; YX-7524-ND
- Producer: Yoshio Ozawa

Archie Shepp chronology
A Touch of the Blues (1977)	On Green Dolphin Street (1978)	Duet (1978)

On Green Dolphin Street is an album by saxophonist Archie Shepp recorded in 1977 for the Japanese Denon label.

== Reception ==
Professional ratings
Review scores
Source	Rating
AllMusic	2.5/5 stars

AllMusic stated: "The fact that Shepp is playing against such a conventional acoustic jazz backdrop gives On Green Dolphin Street its unique tension. The accompanists are a tamer group, working closer to the framework the songs provide. Still, Joe Chambers (drums), Sam Jones (bass), and Walter Bishop, Jr. (piano) are a sophisticated rhythm section managing to balance this with adept flexibility. Shepp's unique voice breathes new life into these standards, paying them the ultimate compliment; On Green Dolphin Street argues and convinces that these songs deserve to be sung again".

== Track listing ==
All compositions by Archie Shepp except where noted.

1. "On Green Dolphin Street" (Bronisław Kaper, Ned Washington) – 7:58
2. "Enough" – 6:39
3. "The Scene Is Clean" (Tadd Dameron) – 6:32
4. "In a Mellow Blues" – 11:19
5. "I Thought About You" (Jimmy Van Heusen, Johnny Mercer) – 9:36

== Personnel ==
- Archie Shepp – tenor saxophone, soprano saxophone
- Walter Bishop Jr. – piano
- Sam Jones – bass
- Joe Chambers – drums
