= Memories (Abdullah Ibrahim album) =

1973 album by Abdullah Ibrahim

Studio album by Abdullah Ibrahim
- Recorded: December 1973
- Genre: Jazz
- Label: Philips

Memories is a solo piano album by Abdullah Ibrahim, recorded in 1973. It was reissued under the title ...Memories.

== Recording and music ==
The album was recorded in December 1973. It contains a tribute to Ibrahim's wife, Sathima Bea Benjamin.

== Release and reception ==
Professional ratings
Review scores
Source	Rating
AllMusic	4/5 stars
The Penguin Guide to Jazz	3/4 stars

Memories was released by Philips Records in Japan. It was later issued on CD and LP by West Wind Records, under the title ...Memories. The AllMusic reviewer concluded that "this solo piano set by Abdullah Ibrahim is spiritual, authoritative, melodic, wistful, nostalgic, and powerful, and grows in interest with each listen."

== Track listing ==
1. "Township Sunday"
2. "Our Son Tsakwe"
3. "Love Song for Bea"
4. "Memories"
5. "Carnival"
6. "Majestic Warriors"
7. "Gafsa – Life Is for the Living, Death Is for Us All"

== Personnel ==
- Abdullah Ibrahim – piano
