= Horace Alexander Young =

American saxophonist and flute player (born 1954)

- Born: November 4, 1954 (age 71); Houston, Texas, U.S.
- Education: Texas Southern University (TSU); Washington State University
- Occupations: Saxophonist, flute player, and jazz educator
- Known for: Performing jazz music Jazz Studies Director at TSU
- Spouse(s): Phyllis Karon Gooden; Regina Belle, m. 1985–1990
- Website: horacealexanderyoung.com

Horace Alexander Young (born November 4, 1954) is an American saxophonist, flutist, composer, songwriter, composer, arranger/orchestrator and author. He has performed alongside acts such as B.B. King, Bill Withers, Freddy Fender, Jonathan Butler, The Manhattans, McCoy Tyner, Nancy Wilson, Norman Brown, Regina Belle, Sam Hopkins, Gerald Alston, Abdullah Ibrahim, The McCoy Tyner Big Band, and Toots Thielemans.

Young is also an educator, having taught on the music faculty of Washington State University (1998–2008 and 2015–2022), and at other educational institutions such as Sonoma State University (1983–84) and Rutgers University (1984–85),[4] Texas Southern University (2008–2014) and Houston Community College (2010–2014 and 2022–). Additionally, he served as the Chair of the Contemporary Music Program at Santa Fe University of Art and Design (SFUAD) from 2014 to 2017 – where he established the student-run record label, ARROYO RECORDS which released two recordings during his tenure there.[5] Young is now Professor Emeritus of Music at Washington State University.[4]

== Biography ==
=== Early years and education ===
Young is a native of Houston, Texas. He started taking music lessons at eight years of age, initially on the piano, but he subsequently took up the flute, clarinet, and saxophone. These early studies as a woodwind player were with Hal Tennyson (formerly of The Glenn Miller Orchestra) and with his junior high school Band Director, Edmund Broussard (formerly of The Count Basie Band). While his goal was to become a journalist and author, he saw music as a "serious hobby". He played his first paying "gigs" at age 13 and was active in a few "garage bands throughout his junior and senior high school years.

In addition to his early private studies, he studied (flute and saxophone) at the university levels and through private mentoring with – Campbell "Skeets" Tolbert, Aaron Horne, and Robert Austin (at Texas Southern); Albert Tipton (Rice University); Frances Risdon, Richard Shanklin and Gregory W. Yasinitsky (at Washington State University) and private instruction with Laura Hunter and Eddie Daniels.

Young earned his BM degree in Music from Texas Southern University in Houston, while a member of the Ocean of Soul, graduating in 1978, and he later pursued an MA in Music at Washington State University (Pullman, Washington), which he completed in 1983. Prior to attending Washington State, he studied for two years at The Shepherd School of Music/Rice University (Houston, Texas), with a focus on Flute Performance and Composition.

=== Teaching ===
After more than three decades of active touring and recording, Young went on to work primarily as a college professor/ music teacher, having taught music courses at various institutions, including positions on the music faculty of Washington State University (1998–2008 and 2015–2022), and at other educational institutions such as Sonoma State University (1983–84) and Rutgers University (1984–85), Texas Southern University (2008–2014) and Houston Community College (2010–2014 and 2022 – ). Additionally, he served as the Chair of the Contemporary Music Program at Santa Fe University of Art and Design (SFUAD) from 2014 to 2017 – where he established the student-run record label, ARROYO RECORDS which released two recordings during his tenure there.[5] Young is now Professor Emeritus of Music at Washington State University, where he was formerly an associate professor, with a teaching focus on Jazz Studies and Music Business. Additionally, from 2008 to 2014, he directed the Texas Southern University Jazz Experience Big Band and The Joe Sample Jazz Orchestra (founded by TSU Artist in residence, Joe Sample).

In 1997, Young developed his own record label (Design Records), which he operated until 2008, after which his recordings were released on the Pacific Coast Jazz label. Young has performed for various events throughout the world, including at major jazz festivals in Hamburg, Berlin, Munich and Leverkusen (Germany), London, Glasgow, New York, Detroit, Chicago, Houston and Seattle.

== Concerts and tours ==
Young has appeared alongside a wide range of performers in various music genres. He has done collaborations in jazz, R&B, Christian music, urban/rap, cabaret and other types of music. He has performed with David Ruffin, The Manhattans, The Temptations, Tavares, The Four Tops, Anita Baker, B.B. King, Betty Carter, Bill Withers, Dave Liebman, Rev. E. Stewart and The Stewart Singers, Gerald Alston, Jonathan Butler, Johnny Kemp, Joe Sample, McCoy Tyner, Milt Hinton, Mista Madd, Nancy Wilson, The Ojays, Rev. Paul Jones, Regina Belle, Roberta Flack, Sam "Lightnin′" Hopkins, The Chi-Lites, Scarface, The Spinners, the McCoy Tyner Big Band, Dennis Edwards, Lucy Arnaz and Yvonne Roome.

In 1993, Young conducted South Africa's National Symphony during a concert held in honour of South African pianist and composer Abdullah Ibrahim. This fete was a first in the region for a Black American, becoming the first to conduct such an orchestra. Young appeared in the 2005 documentary film Abdullah Ibrahim: A Struggle for Love, directed by Ciro Cappellari.

== Recordings ==
Young has performed on recordings for several musicians, among them Bubbha Thomas, Freddy Fender, B.B. King, Madd Hatta, Abdullah Ibrahim, Regina Belle, Mark Ledford, Texas Johnny Brown and Youssou N'Dour.

=== Albums ===
Acoustic Contemporary Jazz

In May 2008 Young released his first solo album, entitled Acoustic Contemporary Jazz, which met with positive reviews. Released on the Pacific Coast Jazz label, this album features 12 tracks, including a remake of Luther Vandross's original "Dance With My Father". The album features collaborations with Andre Hayward, Brent Carter, Dwight Sills, Johnny Kemp and Onaje Allan Gumbs.

1. "Dance With My Father"
2. "Heart's Desire (In a Very Special Way)"
3. "Chicken n' Waffles"
4. "Joan-Cape Town Flower"
5. "Find Your Love"
6. "Let's Lounge"
7. "Glory To His Name"
8. "That Kind of Girl"
9. "So Special"
10. "One of a Kind"
11. "Danny Boy"
12. "So Special (Radio Edit Instrumental)"

As of 2024, Horace Alexander Young has appeared on 237+ recordings. His specific contributions are in the areas of woodwind performance, arranging, production, vocal performance, and coaching. His most recent activity was on the landmark recording project, The Voice of Brubeck, Vol.1 – Song of Hope and Peace – a live recording featuring The Brubeck Brothers Quartet, The Paul English Quartet, The Houston Chamber Choir and Horace Alexander Young. Released on 8/30/2024 on PARMA/Navona Records-NV6668. Wrote instrumental and choral arrangements for two selections – Boogie 1 am and Festival Hall and played on 10 selections (piccolo, flute, bass flute and tenor saxophone). This recording received a Silver Medal in the 2024 Global Music Awards (September 2024).

== Personal life ==
From 1994 to 2009, Young was married to Phyllis Karon Gooden, with whom he had two children, Victoria-Pearl Young and Alexander Charles Young

From 1985 to 1990, Young was married to singer/recording artist Regina Belle, with whom he adopted a daughter, Tiy (born in 1989).
