= Marcus McLaurine =

American jazz bassist, composer, and educator (born 1952)

- Born: May 7, 1952; Omaha, Nebraska, United States
- Education: University of Nebraska–Lincoln
- Occupations: Jazz bassist, composer and educator

Marcus McLaurine (born May 7, 1952) is an American jazz bassist, composer, and educator.

== Biography ==
McLaurine was born on May 7, 1952, in Omaha, Nebraska. He studied music at the University of Nebraska–Lincoln, before moving to Los Angeles. He was a member of Horace Tapscott's Union of God's Musicians and Artists Ascension for part of the 1970s. McLaurine joined the military in 1976 and played in the 590th Air Force band. After four years, he left the air force and moved to New York City.

McLaurine began a long association with Clark Terry in the early 1980s. They recorded together numerous times. McLaurine recorded several albums under the leadership of pianist Abdullah Ibrahim in the 1990s. McLaurine has been an instructor in jazz at William Paterson University since 1997.

McLaurine is a member of the band Native Soul, with Steve Johns, Noah Haidu, and Peter Brainin. They released Rough Jazz in 2006, Soul Step in 2011, and One Mind in 2012.

== Discography ==
=== As leader/co-leader ===
- Rough Jazz (Apria, 2006)
- Soul Step (Talking Drum, 2011)
- One Mind (American Showplace, 2012)

=== As sideman ===
With Kenny Burrell

- Guiding Spirit (Contemporary, 1989)

With Michael Cochrane

- Song of Change (Soul Note, 1992)

With John Hicks

- Blues March: Portrait of Art Blakey (Venus, 1992)
- Moanin': Portrait of Art Blakey (Venus, 1992)

With Abdullah Ibrahim

- Yarona (Tiptoe, 1995)
- Cape Town Flowers (Tiptoe, 1997)
- Cape Town Revisited (Tiptoe, 1997)
- African Symphony (Enja)

With Nancy Monroe

- Dance My Heart (mja Records,1994)
- The Love Within (mja Records, 2001)

With Mook Loxley

- Caress (2011)

With Danny Mixon

- Pass It On (2016)

With Cristina Morrison

- I Love (Baronesa, 2012)

With Clark Terry

- Squeeze Me! (Chiaroscuro, 1989)
- Live at the Village Gate (Chesky, 1990)
- The Hymn (Candid, 1993)
- Shades of Blues (Challenge, 1994)
- Top and Bottom Brass (Chiaroscuro, 1995)
- Herr Ober (Nagel Heyer, 1999)
- Live on QE2 (Chiaroscuro, 2000)
- Friendship (Eighty Eights, 2002)
