= African Sketchbook =

1969 album by Abdullah Ibrahim

Studio album by Abdullah Ibrahim
- Recorded: 16 May 1969
- Studio: Radio Bern
- Genre: Jazz
- Label: Enja
- Producer: Horst Weber

African Sketchbook is an album by Abdullah Ibrahim, recorded in 1969.

== Recording and music ==
The album was recorded on 16 May 1969 at Radio Bern. It was produced by Horst Weber. Abdullah Ibrahim plays flute on the first track, "Air", and piano on the remaining pieces. He wrote all of the compositions.

== Release and reception ==
Professional ratings
Review scores
Source	Rating
AllMusic	4.5/5 stars
The Penguin Guide to Jazz	2.5/4 stars

African Sketchbook was released on LP by Enja Records. The AllMusic reviewer concluded that, "The recording quality leaves a little to be desired, but the wonderful music more than makes up for it. Highly recommended, especially for those who came to Ibrahim's music later in his career and who are unfamiliar with his early, arguably more substantial work." The Penguin Guide to Jazz commented that the album "is as bitty as it sounds [from its title]".

== Track listing ==
1. "Air"
2. "Salaam-Peace-Hamba Kahle"
3. "Slave Bell"
4. "The Stride"
5. "Mamma"
6. "Krotoa"
7. "Machopi"
8. "Tokai"
9. "The Dream"
10. "The Aloe and the Wildrose"
11. "Tariq"
12. "Nkosi"
13. "African Sun"
14. "Salaam-Peace-Hamba Kahle"

== Personnel ==
- Abdullah Ibrahim – piano, flute
