= One-Upmanship (album) =

Studio album by Mal Waldron & Steve Lacy
- Released: 1977
- Recorded: February 12, 1977
- Genre: Jazz
- Length: 42:04
- Label: Enja
- Producer: Horst Weber

Mal Waldron chronology
| Like Old Time (1976) | One-Upmanship (1977) | Moods (1978) |

Steve Lacy chronology
| Raps (1977) | One-Upmanship (1977) | Threads (1977) |

One-Upmanship is an album by American jazz pianist Mal Waldron with soprano saxophonist Steve Lacy, recorded in 1977, and released by the Enja label. The CD reissue added three solo piano pieces to the original album.

== Reception ==
The Allmusic review awarded the album 4 stars.

Professional ratings
Review scores
| Source | Rating |
|---|---|
| Allmusic | 4/5 stars |
| Tom Hull | B+ |

== Track listing ==
All compositions by Mal Waldron

1. "One-Upmanship" — 11:05
2. "Duquility" — 8:31 Bonus track on CD reissue
3. "The Seagulls of Kristiansund" — 11:20
4. "Thoughtful" — 6:07 Bonus track on CD reissue
5. "Hooray for Herbie" — 19:39
6. "Soul Eyes" — 6:49 Bonus track on CD reissue

- Recorded at Conny's Studio in Wolperath, West Germany on February 12, 1977 (tracks 1, 3 & 5) and at Tonstudio Bauer in Ludwigsburg, West Germany on May 8, 1978 (tracks 2, 4 & 6).

== Personnel ==
- Mal Waldron — piano
- Manfred Schoof — cornet (tracks 1, 3 & 5)
- Steve Lacy — soprano saxophone (tracks 1, 3 & 5)
- Jimmy Woode — bass (tracks 1, 3 & 5)
- Makaya Ntshoko — drums (tracks 1, 3 & 5)
