= Autobiography (Abdullah Ibrahim album) =

1978 live album by Abdullah Ibrahim (Dollar Brand)

Live album by Abdullah Ibrahim (Dollar Brand)
- Released: 1978 (LP), 2001 (CD)
- Recorded: 18 June 1978
- Genre: Post-bop; South African jazz
- Label: Plainisphare (LP); Elephant (CD)

Abdullah Ibrahim (Dollar Brand) chronology
Duet (1978)	Autobiography (1978)	Echoes from Africa (1979)

Professional ratings
Review scores
Source	Rating
AllMusic	4/5 stars
The Rolling Stone Jazz Record Guide	4/5 stars
The Penguin Guide to Jazz Recordings	3.5/4 stars

Autobiography is a live recording by pianist and flautist Abdullah Ibrahim (also known as Dollar Brand), taken from a concert on 18 June 1978 in Switzerland. On the recording, Ibrahim recalls his childhood in South Africa through the songs he learned then, progressing to his own compositions in adulthood. Originally released as a two-disc LP set, the album has since been reissued on CD.

== Track listing ==
1. "What Really Happened in the Cornfields is that the Birds Made Musical all the Day and so I Let a Song Go Out of my Heart at Duke’s Place" – "Anthem For the New Nations"
2. "Biral"
3. "Gwidza" – "Yukio-Kahlifa" – "Intro Liberation Dance"
4. "African Marketplace" – "Tokai" – "Llanga" – "African Sun"
5. "The Dream"
6. "Liberation Dance"
7. "Did You Hear That Sound ?" – "Our Son Tsakwe" – "The Wedding" – "I Surrender Dear" (Harry Barris/Gordon Clifford) – "One Day When We Were Young"
8. "Drop Me Off in Harlem" (Duke Ellington)
9. "Take the "A" Train" ((Billy Strayhorn) – "Coming on the Hudson" – "Moniebah"
10. "Little Boy"
11. "Cherry"
12. "Ishmael" – "Mannenberg" – "Children of Africa"/"Banyana" – "Peace-Salaam" – "Anthem for the New Nations"
13. "Khoisan"
