= African Portraits =

1973 album by Abdullah Ibrahim

Studio album by Abdullah Ibrahim
- Recorded: 18 February 1973
- Venue: Toronto
- Genre: Jazz
- Label: Sackville

African Portraits is a solo piano album by Abdullah Ibrahim. It was recorded in 1973 and released by Sackville Records. Parts of the original release were later issued on compilation albums.

== Recording and music ==
The album was recorded in Toronto on 18 February 1973. Material from the recording session was released on this album and on Sangoma.

== Releases and reception ==
Professional ratings
Review scores
Source	Rating
AllMusic	4/5 stars
The Penguin Guide to Jazz	3/4 stars

African Portraits was released by Sackville Records. The AllMusic reviewer concluded that, "There are many recordings available by the unique pianist, and this set is an above-average and consistently stirring effort." The Penguin Guide to Jazz observed that the recording was "in dramatic close-up".

Material from African Portraits and Sangoma was later compiled in the album Ancient Africa, which was released by Sackville in 1994. A 2017 CD reissue of this compilation added a previously unreleased track featuring Ibrahim on flute as well as reciting words. It was issued by Delmark Records, which had earlier acquired the Sackville catalogue.

== Track listing ==
1. "Cherry/Bra Joe from Kilimanjaro" – 21:18
2. "Blues for Hughie/Kippie/Gafsa – Life Is for the Living, Death Is for All of Us/Gwangwa/Little Boy/Easter Joy/Jabulani/Xaba – 24:10

== Personnel ==
- Abdullah Ibrahim – piano
