= Senzo =

2008 solo piano album by Abdullah Ibrahim

Studio album by Abdullah Ibrahim
- Released: 27 October 2008
- Genre: Jazz
- Length: 57:19
- Label: Sunnyside

Senzo is a 2008 solo piano album by Abdullah Ibrahim.

== Recording and music ==
All of the compositions are by Ibrahim, except for "In a Sentimental Mood". "Ibrahim moves from the discordant, free-sounding improvisation of 'Ocean and the River', and the joyous, township-jive sounds of 'Tookah' and 'Banjana, Children of Africa', to the soulful and meditative 'Blues for a Hip King'". The last of these is a tribute to Duke Ellington; "For Coltrane" is a John Coltrane tribute. "The melody near the beginning of 'Dust (Reprise)' evokes Maynard Ferguson's 'Coconut Champagne' – its descending and syncopated riff [...] But then as the left-hand transitions to a cyclical and gently syncopated pattern over which his right-hand played bursts of notes it settles into a typical South African Marabi sound with overtones of bop".

== Release and reception ==
Professional ratings
Review scores
Source	Rating
AllMusic	4/5 stars
DownBeat	4.5/5 stars

The title of the album means "ancestor" in Japanese and Chinese, and is the name of Ibrahim's father. Senzo was released by Sunnyside Records on 27 October 2008 in the UK and on 3 March 2009 in the US.

The AllMusic reviewer commented: "There's an ebb and flow to the program that makes you want to listen all the way through, but certain familiar signposts along the way remind you how distinctive and singularly unique Ibrahim's style is." The DownBeat reviewer wrote of the "at once introspective and expansive feel of this breathtaking CD".

== Track listing ==
This listing is from the Sunnyside website. Other sources give a different track order, perhaps from a different release.

1. "Dust" – 1:05
2. "Corridors Radiant" – 1:18
3. "Jabulani" – 1:05
4. "Dust (Reprise)" – 5:13
5. "Nisa" – 6:15
6. "'Senzo' – Contours And Time" – 2:29
7. "Meditation/Mummy" – 2:17
8. "Banyana, Children of Africa" – 0:52
9. "Mamma" – 1:05
10. "Blue Bolero" – 6:07
11. "In a Sentimental Mood" – 3:01
12. "Ocean & The River" – 1:23
13. "Ocean & The River" – 2:45
14. "In the Evening" – 3:06
15. "Blues for Bea" – 0:53
16. "Prelude 'For Coltrane'" – 0:55
17. "Aspen" – 1:13
18. "Blues for a Hip King" – 6:03
19. "Third Line Samba" – 2:10
20. "Tookah" – 1:26
21. "Pula" – 1:32
22. "For Coltrane" – 5:07

== Personnel ==
- Abdullah Ibrahim – piano
