= A Brother with Perfect Timing =

1987 South African documentary film

A Brother with perfect timing
- Directed by: Chris Austin (film director)
- Produced by: Gill Bond
- Starring: Abdullah Ibrahim, Carlos Ward, Ricky Ford
- Cinematography: Peter Chappell
- Edited by: Larry Sider
- Music by: Abdullah Ibrahim
- Distributed by: Africa Film Library
- Release date: 1987
- Running time: 90 minutes
- Country: South Africa
- Language: English

A Brother With Perfect Timing is a 1987 documentary film, directed by Chris Austin, about musician Abdullah Ibrahim and his struggle against apartheid in South Africa.

== Background ==
A Brother With Perfect Timing was filmed in 1986—four years before the release from prison of Nelson Mandela, and while the apartheid regime was still in place. The documentary includes a live performance by Ibrahim and discussions about two of his compositions, "Anthem for a New Nation" and "Mannenberg".

As described by the reviewer for KUVO radio, "Throughout the film, Ibrahim plays different roles. At times he is the narrator, telling stories and sharing anecdotes, cultural and musical history lessons, offering metaphors, and even jokes for how he and other musicians developed and grew into being. .. is seen performing with his septet Ekaya at the Manhattan nightclub Sweet Basil, as well as rehearsing a with choral group. Some scenes in South Africa feature actors dramatizing events that Ibrahim recounts."

Musicians featured with Ibrahim include Carlos Ward, Ricky Ford, Charles Davis, Essiet Okon Essiet, Don Mumford and Ben Riley.

The film was originally broadcast in the BBC Two series Arena on 27 February 1987.

== Reception ==
The New York Times positively reviewed the film, calling it "a well-rounded view of a musician for whom exile means both pain and inspiration". The film was reviewed in the 2004 book Jazz on Film, in which author Scott Yanow praised the movie's "blend of interviews and music". Coda magazine also reviewed the documentary, commenting that Ibrahim "comes across as an admirable and dignified religious man".
