= Jazzbühne Berlin '82 =

1982 live album by Abdullah Ibrahim

Live album by Abdullah Ibrahim
- Recorded: 12 June 1982
- Venues: Volksbühne, East Berlin
- Genre: Jazz
- Label: Repertoire

Jazzbühne Berlin '82 is an album by Abdullah Ibrahim. It was recorded in concert in East Berlin in 1982.

== Recording, release and reception ==
Professional ratings
Review scores
Source	Rating
AllMusic	3/5 stars
The Penguin Guide to Jazz	3/4 stars

The album was recorded in concert on 12 June 1982 at Volksbühne in East Berlin. It was released on CD by Repertoire Records. The Penguin Guide to Jazz criticised the sound quality, describing it as "tinny, echoing and rather flat. It's difficult to judge whether the fault lies with the acoustic, the piano itself (which doesn't sound that responsive) or the recording technology, for the 'Liberation Suite' medley is in every other regard an absolutely characteristic performance."

== Track listing ==
1. "Liberation Suite" – 52:43
2. "Medley" – 10:41

== Personnel ==
- Abdullah Ibrahim – piano
