= Moanin': Portrait of Art Blakey =

Studio album by New York Rhythm Machine
- Recorded: October 19, 1992
- Studio: Sear Sound, New York City
- Genre: Jazz
- Label: Venus

John Hicks chronology
Blues March: Portrait of Art Blakey (1992)	Moanin': Portrait of Art Blakey (1992)	Beyond Expectations (1993)

Moanin': Portrait of Art Blakey is an album by the New York Rhythm Machine, led by pianist John Hicks.

== Background ==
Pianist John Hicks was part of Art Blakey's band for two years from 1964. Blakey died in 1990.

== Recording and music ==
The album was recorded at Sear Sound, New York City, on October 19, 1992. The musicians were Hicks, bassist Marcus McLaurine, and drummer Victor Lewis.

== Releases ==
Moanin': Portrait of Art Blakey was released by Venus Records. Venus later issued a CD with the same title, crediting it to Hicks as leader; it contained six tracks, that combined some from the original release and some from Blues March: Portrait of Art Blakey.

== Track listing ==
1. "Moanin'"
2. "Nica's Dream"
3. "'Round Midnight"
4. "Caravan"
5. "I Remember Clifford"
6. "No Problem – 2"

== Personnel ==
- John Hicks – piano
- Marcus McLaurine – bass
- Victor Lewis – drums
