= African River =

1989 studio album by Abdullah Ibrahim

Studio album by Abdullah Ibrahim
- Released: 1989
- Recorded: June 1, 1989
- Studio: Van Gelder Studio, Englewood Cliffs, NJ
- Genre: Jazz
- Length: 45:07
- Label: Enja
- Producer: Abdullah Ibrahim

Abdullah Ibrahim chronology
Blues for a Hip King (1988)	African River (1989)	No Fear, No Die (1990)

African River is a 1989 album by South African jazz pianist Abdullah Ibrahim.

== Reception ==
Professional ratings
Review scores
Source	Rating
AllMusic	4/5 stars
Los Angeles Times	3/5 stars
The Penguin Guide to Jazz	4/4 stars

The AllMusic review by Scott Yanow praised the album, commenting that "more important than the individual players are the colorful ensembles and the frequently memorable compositions". The Penguin Guide to Jazz described it as "absolutely superb and a vivid extension of the kind of arrangements Ibrahim had attempted on African Space Program".

== Track listing ==
1. "Toi-Toi" – 3:27
2. "African River" – 9:44
3. "Joan – Capetown Flower" – 5:46
4. "Chisa" – 4:24
5. "Sweet Samba" – 5:52
6. "Duke 88" – 8:27
7. "The Wedding" – 3:54
8. "The Mountain of the Night" – 3:33

== Personnel ==
- Abdullah Ibrahim – piano, leader
- Horace A. Young – alto saxophone
- John Stubblefield – tenor saxophone
- Robin Eubanks – trombone
- Howard Johnson – baritone saxophone. tuba, trumpet
- Buster Williams – bass
- Brian Abrahams – drums
