= Sangoma (Abdullah Ibrahim album) =

1973 solo piano album by Abdullah Ibrahim

Studio album by Abdullah Ibrahim
- Recorded: 18 February 1973
- Venue: Toronto
- Genre: Jazz
- Label: Sackville

Sangoma is a solo piano album by Abdullah Ibrahim. It was recorded in 1973 and released by Sackville Records. Parts of the original release were later issued on compilation albums.

== Recording and music ==
The album was recorded in Toronto on 18 February 1973. Material from the recording session was released on this album and on African Portraits.

"The Aloe and the Wild Rose" and "Ancient Africa" each contain three parts. The other track, "Fats, Duke and the Monk", is a six-song suite.

== Releases and reception ==
Professional ratings
Review scores
Source	Rating
AllMusic	4.5/5 stars
The Penguin Guide to Jazz	3/4 stars

Sangoma was released by Sackville Records. The AllMusic review by Scott Yanow concluded that "Ibrahim's distinctive percussive style with its emphasis on folk melodies was very much in evidence at this relatively early stage." The Penguin Guide to Jazz observed that the recording was "in dramatic close-up".

Material from Sangoma and African Portraits was later compiled in the album Ancient Africa, which was released by Sackville in 1994. A 2017 CD reissue of this compilation added a previously unreleased track featuring Ibrahim on flute as well as reciting words. It was issued by Delmark Records, which had earlier acquired the Sackville catalogue.

== Track listing ==
1. "The Aloe and the Wild Rose" – 13:30
2. "Fats, Duke and the Monk" – 11:25
3. "Ancient Africa" – 19:40

== Personnel ==
- Abdullah Ibrahim – piano
