= The Song Is My Story =

2014 live album by Abdullah Ibrahim

Live album by Abdullah Ibrahim
- Released: 2014
- Recorded: 2014
- Venue: Fazioli concert hall, Sacile, Italy
- Genre: Jazz
- Label: Intuition, Sunnyside

The Song Is My Story is an album by Abdullah Ibrahim. Most of the tracks are solo piano performances recorded in 2014.

== Recording and music ==
The album was recorded in concert at the Fazioli concert hall in Sacile. Most of the tracks are solo piano performances by Abdullah Ibrahim; on two tracks he plays saxophone. Much of the material consists of his own compositions; some of the tracks are improvisations.

== Release and reception ==
Professional ratings
Review scores
| Source | Rating |
|---|---|
| AllMusic | 4/5 stars |
| The Guardian | 4/5 stars |

The Song Is My Story was released by Intuition Records in 2014, and by Sunnyside Records in 2015. A DVD of interviews and concert recordings was included.

The AllMusic reviewer commented: "Lyrical and intimate, this evocative concert showcases Ibrahim's distinctive, classical-influenced, free improvisation style." John Fordham's review in The Guardian concluded: "Most of this music works in gently blooming harmonies and quiet melodic turns varied by the odd boppish flurry, though on 'Kalahari Pleiades' he hits an almost Jarrett-like groove. It's all played with a remarkable liquid touch, and feels like a late-life Ibrahim renaissance."

== Track listing ==
1. "Celestial Bird Dance"
2. "Threshold"
3. "Open Door – Within"
4. "Unfettered – Muken"
5. "Spiral Mist"
6. "Just Arrived
7. "Kalahari Pleiades"
8. "For Coltrane"
9. "Twelve by Twelve"
10. "Shadows Lean Against My Song"
11. "The Song Is My Story – URA"
12. "Marinska"
13. "African Dawn"
14. "Eclipse at Dawn"
15. "Phambili – Looking Ahead"
16. "For Coltrane"
17. "Children Dance"

== Personnel ==
- Abdullah Ibrahim – piano, saxophone (tracks 1, 17)
