= Noah Haidu =

American jazz musician

Noah Haidu is an American jazz pianist based in New York City, known for using his melodic compositions as a framework for energetic, modernist improvisations. His group appears regularly at New York jazz venues such as Smalls Jazz Club and Kitano Jazz. His recordings include Slipstream (his 2011 CD on Posi-Tone Records), Here, There... (where Haidu and guitarist Mike Stern perform as guest sidemen in a quartet setting), Soul Step (a project where he is heard as pianist and co-leader in the collective quartet Native Soul), and Infinite Distances (released in 2017). Through these varied projects, Haiduh has been noted both as a performer and composer.

== Biography ==
Born in Charlottesville, Virginia, Haidu took classical piano lessons from a young age, but as a teenager, he gravitated to blues, jazz, and popular music. During high-school he lived in New Jersey and Los Angeles where he studied jazz piano, guitar, and composition and listened to live music. He attended Rutgers University and studied with pianist Kenny Barron, then relocated to New York after two years. He completed his BFA at the New School University and Master of Music degree at The State University of New York (Purchase, NY).

== Collaborations ==
Haidu has been associated with artists such as Jeremy Pelt, Jon Irabagon, Duane Eubanks, Winard Harper, Willie Jones, III, Corcoran Holt, Jason Brown, McClenty Hunter, Steve Johns, Marcus McLaurine and Peter Brainin. Though based in New York City, Haidu performs abroad and at various cities across the US. In 2007, he appeared with Native Soul in Guayaquil, Ecuador at the Centro Ecuatoriano-Norteamericano and at Jazz at Lincoln Center in New York. He also appeared with the Ambrose Akinmusire-Greg Rivkin group at the Jazz Standard as part of the Festival of the New Trumpet in New York City.

== Reviews ==
Haidu's playing and composing have been cited in a wide range of national and international publications including The Financial Times, Jazz Times, Downbeat, Jazzwise and Icon Magazine.
