= Mindif (album) =

1988 album by Abdullah Ibrahim (soundtrack of film "Chocolat")

Studio album by Abdullah Ibrahim
- Released: 7 and 8 March 1988
- Recorded: 1988
- Genre: Jazz
- Length: 39:10
- Label: Enja

Abdullah Ibrahim chronology
South Africa (1986)	Mindif (1988)	Blues for a Hip King (1989)

Mindif is an album by Abdullah Ibrahim. It was performed and recorded for the soundtrack of the 1988 French drama film Chocolat.

== Reception ==
Professional ratings
Review scores
Source	Rating
AllMusic	2.5/5 stars
The Penguin Guide to Jazz	3/4 stars

The AllMusic reviewer concluded that "the overall results, while pleasant, are not as essential as Ibrahim's best work". The Penguin Guide to Jazz wrote that "Powell and Handy are both exciting players and Higgins's drumming is so imaginative as often to become the focus of a piece".

== Track listing ==
1. "Earth Bird" - 3:03
2. "African Market" - 8:17
3. "Mindif" - 6:46
4. "Pule (Rain)" - 4:52
5. "Protée" - 4:35
6. "Star Dance" - 4:59
7. "Theme For Mark" - 3:26
8. "Serenity (The Daybreak Song)" - 3:08

== Personnel ==
- Abdullah Ibrahim – piano, flute, voice
- Craig Handy – tenor saxophone, flute
- Ricky Ford – soprano & tenor saxophone
- Benny Powell – trombone
- David Williams – bass
- Billy Higgins – drums
