= Ancient Africa (album) =

Live album by Abdullah Ibrahim
- Released: 1974
- Recorded: June 1972
- Venue: Jazzhus Montmartre, Copenhagen
- Genre: Jazz
- Label: JAPO

Ancient Africa is an album by Abdullah Ibrahim, recorded in concert in 1972.

== Recording and music ==
The album was recorded in concert at Jazzhus Montmartre in Copenhagen, in June 1972. The material is a long medley of originals played on the piano, with an encore played on the flute.

== Release and reception ==
Professional ratings
Review scores
Source	Rating
The Penguin Guide to Jazz	3/4 stars

Ancient Africa was released on LP in 1974 by JAPO Records, part of ECM Records. A reviewer for ECM commented that, "As with so much of Ibrahim's output, an underlying propulsion lends sanctity to the overarching message."

== Track listing ==
1. "Bra Joe from Kilimanjaro/Mamma/Tokai/Llanga/Cherry/African Sun" – 23:05
2. "African Sun [Continued]/Tintinyana/Xaba/Peace – Salaam/Air" – 21:55

== Personnel ==
- Abdullah Ibrahim – piano, flute
