= Steve Bloom =

South African photographer and writer

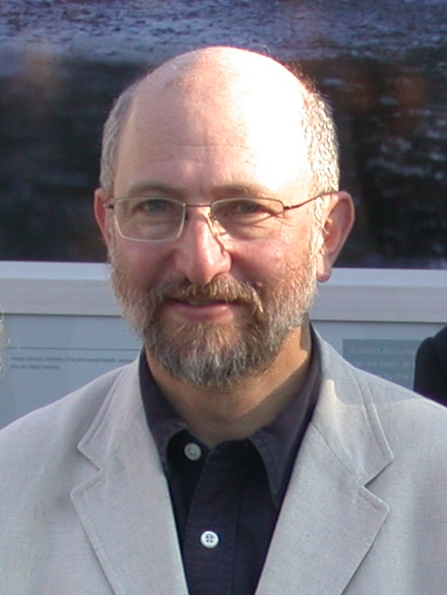
Bloom at the Spirit of the Wild exhibition opening, Birmingham, England, 2005

Steve Bloom (born 1953) is a South African photographer and writer. Son of journalist, novelist, and political activist Harry Bloom, he is best known for his photography books and essays as well as his large scale outdoor exhibitions called Spirit of the Wild.

== Early life ==
Bloom was born in Johannesburg, South Africa.

== Career ==
Bloom's early interest in photography was inspired by the pictures in Life magazine. In 1972 he trained as a gravure printer, and took portraits of people living under the Apartheid system. In 1977 he travelled to England where some of the pictures were published and exhibited internationally by The International Defence and Aid Fund.

For several years he worked in graphic arts, and in 1999 was jointly responsible for the implementation of the Addison designs for the official posters for the summer Olympic Games in Barcelona, 1992.

Bloom began to photograph wildlife in 1993 while on vacation in South Africa. In 1996 he devoted all his time to wildlife photography and spent the following two years working on his first book, In Praise of Primates, which was published in ten languages. In 2004 Untamed, an oversize book that features animals from all the world's continents, was published in ten language editions for its first printing, and in 2006 he published two monographs: Elephant! and Spirit of the Wild.

In 2006 he returned to photographing people. Living Africa, published in 2008, is a body of photographs covering several African countries, mixing photographs of wildlife, remote tribal groups, and people in cities, including gold miners 3 km underground. Bloom's second book on Africa, Trading Places – The Merchants of Nairobi, features subsistence shopkeepers in the suburbs of Nairobi, including Kibera. He has also published several children's books including My Big Cats Journal (Thames & Hudson), My Favourite Animal Families (Thames & Hudson) and Les animaux racontés aux enfants (Editions de la Martinière Jeunesse).

By 2010, Bloom had produced eleven city centre outdoor exhibitions called Spirit of the Wild, each consisting of up to 100 large format weather-sealed prints. Free and usually open to the public 24 hours a day, the theme of the exhibitions was to engender awareness of habitat encroachment and global warming. The inaugural exhibition, in Birmingham, England, ran for eleven months in Centenary Square. Further exhibitions followed in Copenhagen, Leeds, Amsterdam, Stockholm, Moscow, Dublin, Oslo, Stavanger, Barcelona, Edinburgh, Tokyo, and Abbeville. The Copenhagen exhibition opened on 16 May 2006 and was visited by 1,019,028 people during the first three months.

In June 2012, the London Festival of Photography featured his exhibition, Beneath the Surface: South Africa in the 1970s at The Guardian's gallery in London. The exhibition showed his early work in apartheid South Africa, portraying a critical time in the country's history when widescale protests against apartheid took hold. The exhibition ran at Canterbury Museum's Beaney Special Exhibitions Gallery from 19 October and 19 January 2020. It was hosted by Leicester Museum and Art Gallery from 4 February to 10 May 2023.

== Publications ==
- Trading Places – The Merchants of Nairobi. Thames & Hudson, 2009. ISBN 0-500-54381-X.
- Living Africa. Thames & Hudson, 2008. ISBN 0-500-51427-5.
- Untamed. Abrams. Paperback Compact edition 2008. ISBN 0-8109-7237-9.
- Spirit of the Wild. Thames & Hudson, 2006. ISBN 0-500-51437-2
- Elephant!. Thames & Hudson, 2006. ISBN 0-500-51321-X.
- Spirit of the Wild. Self-published. Exhibition edition.
- Untamed.
  - Untamed. Hardback. 2004. Harry N. Abrams. ISBN 0-8109-5611-X.
  - Martinière, Animal, ISBN 2-7324-3113-3. French-language version.
  - Wilde Tiere. Knesebeck. ISBN 3-89660-251-9. German-language version.
  - Insubmissos. Afrontamento. ISBN 972-36-0717-4. Portuguese-language version.
  - Állatok. Alexandra. ISBN 963-367-787-4. Hungarian-language version.
  - Gyvûnai. Alma Litera. ISBN 9955-08-571-1. Lithuanian-language version.
  - Salvajes. Lunwerg. ISBN 84-9785-072-6. Spanish-language version.
  - Dieren. Lannoo. ISBN 90-209-5787-2. Flemish / Dutch-language version.
  - Mondadori, Omaggio Agli Animali, ISBN 88-370-3098-3. Italian-language version.
  - Art Rodnik. Russian-language version.
- In Praise of Primates. Könemann, 1999. ISBN 3-8290-1556-9.
- Elephants: A Book for Children.
  - Elephants: A Book for Children. Thames & Hudson. Text by David Henry Wilson. ISBN 0-500-54344-5.
  - English USA Paperback / Book Fair Safari Scholastic.
  - Mein Groβes Buch der Elefanten Knesebeck. German-language version.
  - El pequeno gran libro de los elefantes. Oniro, 2008. Spanish-language version.
  - Cartea cu elefanti. Editura Art, 2008. Romanian-language version.
  - Elefántkönyv. Athenaeum, 2008. Hungarian-language version.
  - Olifanten – een boek voor kindern. Atrium. Dutch-language version.
  - Les Éléphants. Martinière Jeunesse, 2007.
- My Favourite Animal Families.
  - My Favourite Animal Families. UK and USA: Thames & Hudson, 2010. Text by David Henry Wilson.
  - Mein Grosses Buch de Tierfamilien. Knesebeck, 2010. German-language version.
  - Legkedvesebb állataim. Athenaeum, 2010. Hungarian-language version.
  - Martinière Jeunesse, Spring 2011. French-language version.
  - Suloisimmat eläinperheet. Karisto Oy, 2011. ISBN 0-500-54390-9. Finnish-language version.
- Portraits d'animaux. Les ours.
  - Portraits d'animaux. Les ours. Martinière Jeunesse, 2010. ISBN 2-7324-4051-5. French-language version.
  - Italian-language version. Hippocampo.
- Untamed Animals of the World. Children's Edition.
  - UK: Abrams, ISBN 0-8109-5988-7; USA: Abrams, ISBN 0-8109-5956-9.
  - Lannoo. ISBN 90-209-6333-3. Dutch-language version.
  - Martinière. ISBN 978-2-7324-3309-7. French-language version.
  - L'ippocampo. ISBN 88-88585-72-9. Italian-language version.
  - Canada: Hurtubise. ISBN 2-89428-840-9. French-language version.
  - Knesebeck. ISBN 9783896603296. German-language version.
- A La Découverte des Animaux. Martinière Jeunesse, 2011. ISBN 2-7324-4336-0.
- My Big Cats Journal. Thames & Hudson. 2012. ISBN 978-0-500-65002-8.
- My Polar Journal. Thames & Hudson. 2012. ISBN 0500650101.
- Les animaux racontés aux enfants. Martinière Jeunesse. ISBN 2-7324-5121-5.

== General references ==
- "Born to be Wild," Rebecca Ley, interview, The Times Magazine, 28 October 2006
- Photo District News (USA), Diane Smyth, interview, June 2008
- "The Big Interview", Professional Photographer Magazine, December 2012
