= Moods (Mal Waldron album) =

Studio album by Mal Waldron
- Released: 1978
- Recorded: May 6 & 8, 1978
- Genre: Jazz
- Length: 84:41
- Label: Enja
- Producer: Horst Weber

Mal Waldron chronology
One-Upmanship (1977)	Moods (1978)	Mingus Lives (1979)

Moods is an album by American jazz pianist Mal Waldron, recorded in 1978, and released by the Enja label. Originally released as a double LP, the CD reissue omitted three of the piano solos (which were included as bonus tracks on the CD reissue of One-Upmanship) to fit onto one compact disc and altered the running order; a later CD reissue reinstated Waldron's "Soul Eyes".

== Reception ==
The Allmusic review by Scott Yanow awarded the album 4 stars, stating: "This enjoyable and subtle music gives one a well-rounded picture of Mal Waldron's talents in the late 1970s."

Professional ratings
Review scores
Source	Rating
Allmusic	4/5 stars

== Track listing ==
All compositions by Mal Waldron except as indicated

1. "Minoat" — 8:11
2. "A Case of Plus 4's" — 15:04
3. "Sieg Haile" — 19:09
4. "Anxiety" — 3:33
5. "Thoughtful" — 6:07 Omitted on CD reissue
6. "Lonely" — 6:33
7. "Happiness" — 3:03
8. "Soul Eyes" — 6:52 Omitted on first CD reissue
9. "I Thought About You" (Jimmy Van Heusen) — 7:38
10. "Duquility" — 8:31 Omitted on CD reissue

- Recorded at Tonstudio Bauer in Ludwigsburg, West Germany, on May 6 (tracks 1––3) and May 8, 1978 (tracks 4–10).

== Personnel ==
- Mal Waldron — piano
- Terumasa Hino — trumpet (tracks 1–3)
- Hermann Breuer — trombone (tracks 1–3)
- Steve Lacy — soprano saxophone (tracks 1–3)
- Cameron Brown — bass (tracks 1–3)
- Makaya Ntshoko — drums (tracks 1–3)
