= Blues March: Portrait of Art Blakey =

Studio album by New York Rhythm Machine
- Recorded: October 19, 1992
- Studio: Sear Sound, New York City
- Genre: Jazz
- Label: Venus

John Hicks chronology
The Missouri Connection (1992)	Blues March: Portrait of Art Blakey (1992)	Moanin': Portrait of Art Blakey (1992)

Blues March: Portrait of Art Blakey is an album by the New York Rhythm Machine, led by pianist John Hicks.

== Background ==
Pianist John Hicks was part of Art Blakey's band for two years from 1964. Blakey died in 1990.

== Recording and music ==
The album was recorded at Sear Sound, New York City, on October 19, 1992. The musicians were Hicks, bassist Marcus McLaurine, and drummer Victor Lewis.

== Releases ==
Blues March: Portrait of Art Blakey was released by Venus Records. Venus later issued a CD, entitled Moanin': Portrait of Art Blakey, credited to Hicks as leader, that used some of the tracks from the Blues March album and some from an earlier release with the title Moanin': Portrait of Art Blakey.

== Track listing ==
1. "No Problem – 1"
2. "Whisper Not"
3. "Like Someone in Love"
4. "Blues March"
5. "Some Other Spring"
6. "A Night in Tunisia"

== Personnel ==
- John Hicks – piano
- Marcus McLaurine – bass
- Victor Lewis – drums
