= Duet (Archie Shepp and Dollar Brand album) =

Studio album by Archie Shepp and Dollar Brand
- Released: 1978
- Recorded: June 5, 1978
- Studio: Nippon Columbia's 1st Studio, Tokyo
- Genre: Jazz
- Length: 44:13
- Label: Denon; YX-7532-ND
- Producer: Yoshio Ozawa

Archie Shepp chronology
On Green Dolphin Street (1977)	Duet (1978)	Archie Shepp Quartet Live in Tokyo (1978)

Dollar Brand chronology
Anthem for the New Nations (1978)	Duet (1978)	Autobiography (1978)

Duet is an album by saxophonist Archie Shepp and pianist Dollar Brand recorded in Tokyo in 1978 for the Japanese Denon label.

== Reception ==
Professional ratings
Review scores
Source	Rating
AllMusic	3/5 stars

AllMusic awarded the album 3 stars, stating: "A somewhat surprising pairing at the time, the former firebrand of the tenor sax and the wonderful South African pianist found a pleasant and relaxed meeting point. By 1978, Shepp had largely abandoned the ferocious attack that gained him renown in the '60s, settling on a rich, Ben Webster-ish tone and playing a repertoire consisting of modern standards and bluesy originals ... But the prevailing sense of relaxation begins to pall after a while and one wishes for a bit more of the old rough and tumble that these two were surely capable of. Still, for those who enjoyed Shepp's mid-'70s dates for Arista/Freedom and Ibrahim's more subdued group efforts of the late '70s and early '80s, there's much good listening here".

== Track listing ==
All compositions by Dollar Brand except where noted.

1. "Fortunato" (Dave Burrell, Marion Brown) – 7:41
2. "Barefoot Boy from Queens Town – To Mongezi" (Archie Shepp) – 7:51
3. "Left Alone" (Mal Waldron) – 7:55
4. "Theme from Proof of the Man" (Yuji Ohno) – 8:18
5. "Ubu-Suku" – 4:35
6. "Moniebah" – 8:22

== Personnel ==
- Archie Shepp – tenor saxophone, alto saxophone, soprano saxophone
- Dollar Brand – piano
