= Squeeze Me! =

Studio album by The Clark Terry Spacemen
- Released: 1989
- Recorded: February 13, 1989
- Studio: Van Gelder Studio, Englewood Cliffs, New Jersey
- Genre: Jazz
- Length: 75:12
- Label: Chiaroscuro; CR(D)309
- Producer: Hank O'Neal

Clark Terry chronology
Portraits (1989)	Squeeze Me! (1989)	Locksmith Blues (1989)

Squeeze Me!, also called The Clark Terry Spacemen, is an album by trumpeter/bandleader Clark Terry which was recorded in 1989 and released by the Chiaroscuro label.

== Reception ==
Professional ratings
Review scores
Source	Rating
AllMusic	3/5 stars

Scott Yanow of AllMusic stated, "This underrated Chiaroscuro CD is a joy from start to finish. Flügelhornist Clark Terry is teamed with an unusually talented group of all-stars which is filled with distinctive and colorful swing stylists. The standards and riff tunes give all of the horn players solo space ... After 55 minutes of music Clark Terry is heard on the 19-minute "Jazzspeak," verbally telling informative stories about his lengthy career, some of which are quite humorous. Highly recommended".

== Track listing ==
All compositions by Clark Terry except where noted

1. "Blues for Gypsy" – 9:53
2. "Swingin' the Blues" (Count Basie, Eddie Durham) – 5:02
3. "Corner Pocket" (Freddie Green) – 8:49
4. "Primpin' at the Prom" (Duke Ellington) – 3:55
5. "For Dancers Only" (Sy Oliver, Don Raye, Vic Schoen) – 7:24
6. "Spacemen" – 6:22
7. "Just Squeeze Me" (Ellington. Lee Gaines) – 7:01
8. "Jones" – 6:56
9. Jazzspeak – 19:00

== Personnel ==
- Clark Terry, Virgil Jones – trumpet
- Al Grey, Britt Woodman – trombone
- Haywood Henry, Phil Woods, Red Holloway – saxophones
- John Campbell – piano
- Marcus McLaurine – bass
- Butch Ballard – drums
