= Yarona (album) =

1995 live album by Abdullah Ibrahim

Live album by Abdullah Ibrahim
- Released: 1995
- Recorded: 13–14 January 1995
- Venue: Sweet Basil Jazz Club, Greenwich Village, New York City, US
- Genre: Jazz, African pop, swing
- Length: 56:11
- Label: Tiptoe / Enja 8888202

Yarona is a 1995 jazz album by South African pianist Abdullah Ibrahim and his group Ekaya, recorded live over two nights at Sweet Basil Jazz Club in Greenwich Village, New York City. Yarona (meaning "abundance" in Setswana) was released on the Enja label.

The album features a trio, including bass player Marcus McLaurine and drummer George Johnson. In Ibrahim's words (quoted in the liner notes, which were written by his son Tsakwe Ibrahim): "As the basic creative format of contemporary urban music and its global expansion from the timeless African fountainhead, the trio concept of piano-bass-drums serves as one of the most viable and essential, indeed, accessible formulae for the pianist/composer."

== Reception ==
Giving the album a four-star rating, AllMusic notes that Ibrahim's ideas "range from bop, African pop, swing, and even hints of a Keith Jarrett influence. 'Mannenberg' and 'African Marketplace,' two Ibrahim classics, are given brief but interesting updates. The remainder of the tracks are all excellent and most exceed six minutes long, allowing for the non-hurried development of ideas by this remarkable trio. Highly recommended for both performance and originality."

Yarona is included on The Penguin Guide to Jazz Core Collection list of albums.

== Track listing ==
All tracks written by Abdullah Ibrahim

1. "Nisa" - 7:29
2. "Duke 88" - 6:55
3. "Cherry/Mannenberg" - 3:40
4. "African River" - 8:06
5. "Tuang Guru" - 8:02
6. "Stardance" - 6:36
7. "African Marketplace" - 1:03
8. "Tintinyana" - 8:28
9. "Barakaat" - 5:52

== Personnel ==
- Abdullah Ibrahim – piano
- Marcus McLaurine – bass
- George Johnson – drums
