= Ode to Duke Ellington =

1973 solo piano album by Abdullah Ibrahim

Studio album by Abdullah Ibrahim
- Recorded: December 1973
- Genre: Jazz
- Label: West Wind

Ode to Duke Ellington is a solo piano album by Abdullah Ibrahim, recorded in 1973.

== Recording and music ==
The album was recorded in December 1973. The material reflects the influence that Duke Ellington had on pianist Abdullah Ibrahim. Ibrahim "improvises impressionistic medleys, sometimes mixing in a few of his themes with Ellington's music."

== Release and reception ==
Professional ratings
Review scores
Source	Rating
AllMusic	4/5 stars
The Penguin Guide to Jazz	3.5/4 stars

Ode to Duke Ellington was released by West Wind Records. The AllMusic reviewer concluded that the album was "An interesting and somewhat introspective (if ultimately joyful) recital of reverent music."

== Track listing ==
1. "Impressions on a Caravan"
2. "Solitude"
3. "Ode to Duke"
4. "In a Sentimental Mood"
5. "What Really Happened in the Cornfields Is That the Birds Made Music All the Day and so I Let a Song Go Out of My Heart at Duke's Place"
6. "Two Spirituals"
7. "Rose Got It Bad in Harlem"

== Personnel ==
- Abdullah Ibrahim – piano
