= Marshall McDonald (saxophonist) =

American musician (born 1959)

Marshall McDonald (born August 31, 1959) is an American jazz saxophonist, woodwind specialist, and bandleader. He is best known for his nearly two-decade tenure as lead alto saxophonist with the Count Basie Orchestra, and for his work with Lionel Hampton, Paquito D'Rivera, Chico O’Farrill, and the Duke Ellington Orchestra. A multi-reed player, McDonald has performed on alto, tenor, baritone saxophones, clarinet, and flute across major jazz ensembles and recordings.

== Early life and education ==
McDonald was born in Pittsburgh, Pennsylvania. He began classical clarinet studies at age nine, initially under Thomas Thompson of the Pittsburgh Symphony at Carnegie Mellon University, and later with William Balawadjer and Nestor Koval at Duquesne University. He later studied jazz saxophone with Dr. Nathan Davis at the University of Pittsburgh, and moved to New York City to study with George Coleman and Dave Tofani.

== Career ==
=== Count Basie Orchestra ===
McDonald first joined the Count Basie Orchestra in 1994 and 1995 under Frank Foster, touring Japan. He became the full-time lead alto saxophonist in 2001, a role he held for 18 years, succeeding Jackie Kelso and occupying the historic chair once held by Marshal Royal.

=== Other ensembles ===
He toured internationally with the Lionel Hampton Orchestra (1991–2001), and was a longtime member of Paquito D'Rivera's United Nation Orchestra, appearing on the Latin Grammy–winning album Tropicana Nights (2000). He also performed with Chico O'Farrill's Afro-Cuban Orchestra, appearing in Calle 54 and the ballroom scene of The Thomas Crown Affair, as well as with the Duke Ellington Orchestra under Mercer and Paul Ellington.

== Style and influence ==
McDonald is widely recognized for his ability to play across all reed chairs in major jazz orchestras. He is known for maintaining the warm, vibrato-rich sound associated with Marshal Royal's lead alto tradition in the Count Basie Orchestra.

== Awards and recordings ==
McDonald appears on several Grammy-nominated albums, including All About That Basie, A Swingin’ Christmas (with Tony Bennett), and Heart of a Legend (with Chico O’Farrill). He was also featured on the Latin Grammy-winning album Tropicana Nights by Paquito D'Rivera.

== Media and teaching ==
In 2018, McDonald was interviewed for the podcast series Inside the Jazz Mind by Musical U, where he discussed his time with the Basie band and jazz philosophy.
