= Harry Bloom =

South African writer and activist (1913–1981)

- Born: Solomon Harris Bloom; 1 January 1913; Johannesburg, Gauteng, South Africa
- Died: 28 July 1981 (aged 68); Canterbury, Kent, England
- Occupations: Journalist; novelist; political activist
- Spouses: Beryl Gordon (m. 1940; div. 1963) Sonia Copeland (m. 1967)
- Children: 3
- Writing career
- Notable works: Transvaal Episode; Whittaker's Wife

Harry Saul Bloom (born Solomon Harris Bloom; 1 January 1913 – 28 July 1981) was a South African journalist, novelist, activist and lecturer.

== Early life and career ==
Solomon Harris Bloom was born into a Jewish South African family. He was educated at the University of the Witwatersrand, obtaining his law degree in 1937. He subsequently became an advocate in Johannesburg. In 1940, he married Beryl Cynthia Gordon, after knowing her three weeks, and they moved to London, living in Old Compton Street during the Blitz. Writing under the pseudonyms Walter and Beryl Storm (to avoid anti-Semitism), they worked as war correspondents during the Second World War, and covered the Nuremberg trials after the war.

The couple moved to Czechoslovakia and together they wrote the book We meet the Czechoslovaks, an account of their early years in Czechoslovakia, also under the Storm pseudonyms. Beryl later played an active role in editing, advising and typing the manuscripts for his subsequent books. Fearful for their security as Stalinism gained strength in post-war Eastern Europe, they returned to South Africa, and settled in Bramley, Johannesburg. In 1957, a few months after Bloom's first novel, Episode in the Transvaal, was published, the family moved to Cape Town.

== Life and work in apartheid South Africa ==
Episode, a novel, was published in 1956; it was later retitled Transvaal Episode. It was dedicated to four people: his wife Beryl, who provided editorial assistance and typed the manuscript; Bram Fischer, Bloom's close friend who defended Nelson Mandela at the Rivonia Trial; Archbishop Trevor Huddleston, and Guy Routh. Bloom worked with Nelson Mandela in Johannesburg in the 1950s. During the state of emergency that followed the Sharpeville massacre in 1960, he was detained for 45 days without charges or trial, first at Roeland Street Prison and later at Worcester Prison near Cape Town. He worked on Whittaker's Wife (1962) during this time. King Kong: An African Jazz Opera (1961) became a musical. Episode was republished in 1981.

== Exile and work in England ==
In 1963, Bloom left South Africa for Kenya, mainly due to his opposition to apartheid, and then moved to England. According to The Times, he came to England "in search of a new life, mainly as an academic and a journalist." His wife and children stayed behind in South Africa.

In 1967, Bloom was appointed Senior Lecturer in Law at the University of Kent. With founding law professor Patrick Fitzgerald, he helped to set up the first Law Department at the university which was rooted in an interdisciplinary ethos. Bloom went on to collaborate with Igor Aleksander, now emeritus professor at Imperial College London, on the societal impact of computer networks and then worked for a newly set up Unit for Legal Research in Computer and Communications, which considered the legal protection of computer software and retrieval of statutes. This involved meetings with the World Intellectual Property Organization (WIPO), one of the specialized agencies of the United Nations, which was created in 1967 "to encourage creative activity and to promote the protection of intellectual property throughout the world." Many of the components of his work, and the articles he wrote, had a significant impact in the early days of the transition from the offline into the online world. He has been remembered "as the founder of the teaching of the law affecting the media in the UK."

== Family and personal life ==
After the war, Bloom and wife Beryl returned to Durban, South Africa, where their first child, Peter, was born in 1944, but he died aged six weeks. In October 1948, their daughter Susan Storm-Bloom, a photographer and jewellery designer, was born in Prague. Their son Stephen Jack Bloom, a photographer and author, was born in Johannesburg in 1953.

Harry and Beryl divorced shortly after Bloom moved to London in 1963. There he met Sonia Copeland, a journalist and writer, and they married in Canterbury, Kent, in 1967. Sonia had two children fathered from an affair with Harry Bloom's student, Colin Stone – Samantha Bloom (born 1975) and actor Orlando Bloom (born January 1977), who until age 13 believed Harry Bloom was their biological father.

Bloom suffered a stroke in 1976. After a period of declining health, he died in a Canterbury hospital in 1981.
