= Ciro Cappellari =

Argentine filmmaker (born 1959)

Ciro Cappellari is an Argentine film director, cinematographer, and screenwriter based in Berlin, Germany.

== Early life and career ==
Born in Buenos Aires, Argentina, in 1959, he grew up in a small town in Patagonia, Ingeniero Jacobacci. When he was 10 his family moved to San Carlos de Bariloche.

=== In Europe ===
In 1980 Cappellari relocated to Europe, first to Italy and then later Munich, where he found work as a photo journalist with the agency Interfoto where he took portraits of public figures for newspapers in Germany and throughout Europe. He then went to Berlin in 1984 to begin his studies at the Deutsche Film- und Fernsehakademie Berlin (DFFB). In 1989 Cappellari realized his first full-length film Amor América a documentary and two years later in 1991 he realized his first feature film Hijo del Río. After this period he continued writing and directing several films such as Sin Querer –Time of the Flamingos (1997) and the documentary about the famous South African pianist Abdullah Ibrahim, A Struggle For Love (2004). Through his experience in photography he also became a well known cinematographer.

== Awards ==
Ciro has won several awards including the best European screenplay for 100 years of Cinema at the Sundance Film Festival, Cinema 100 Award for Sin Querer, Tiempo de Flamencos in 1996 and in 2005 he received the Grimme-Preis in Germany for directing, and cinematography for A Struggle For Love. Films that Cappellari was involved in as director of photography also won several prizes including: Die Blaue Stunde, the Max Opühls Prize in 1992, Schwarzfahrer which won the short film Oscar in 1994 and Mein name ist Bach, the best Swiss film in 2007.

== Filmography ==
=== Writer/director (selection) ===
- The Street And The Rag Ball (2012)
- Francesco e il Papa (2011)
- In Berlin (2009)
- 24h Buenos Aires (2008)
- Bridging the Gap (2007)
- Gens d’Europe - Zambeze (2006)
- Audienz beim Kaiser (2005)
- Welcome Home (2005)
- A Struggle For Love (2004)
- Sin Querer –Tiempo de flamencos (1996)
- Hijo del Río (1991)
- Amor América (1989)

=== T.V. movies as director ===
- Sehnsucht (2005)
- Tatort - Endspiel (2002)

=== Director of Photography (selection) ===
- House of the Sleeping Beauties (2006)
- Maux d’amour (2005)
- Les Champions d'Olympie (2004)
- The Fight (2004)
- Mein Name ist Bach (2003)
- Semana Santa (2001)
- Mörderinnen (2000)
- El acordeón del diablo (2000)
- Voyage Oriental (2000)
- Giora Feidmann Porträt (2000)
- Last Minute Casbah (1999)
- April Children (1998)
- Vampsida (1997)
- Magic Matterhorn (1995)
- Indians Never die (1995)
- Marmor, Stein und Eisen (1994)
- Die Bettkönnigin (1994)
- Joe et Marie (1994)
- Surabaya Jonny (1993)
- Cripple to be Free (1993)
- Am Ende der Nacht (1992)
- Vaterland (1992)
- Schwarzfahrer (1992)
- The Blue Hour (1992)
- Hinter verschlossenen Türen (1992)
- Praktisch und Friedlich (1992)
- Georgette Meunier (1988)
- Der Pannwitz-Blick (1987)
- WalkWoman (1987)
- Habibi - ein Liebesbrief (1985)
- Nihil - oder alle Zeit der Welt (1985)
