= Mackay Davashe =

South African musician (1920–1972)

- Born: Makwenkwe Davashe; 1920; East London, South Africa
- Died: 1972 (aged 51–52); Soweto, South Africa
- Occupation: Musician

Makwenkwe "Mackay" Davashe (1920–1972) was a South African musician. He achieved success as a saxophonist and composer with the Manhattan Brothers and later the Jazz Epistles.

== Biography ==
Davashe was born in 1920 in the South African city of East London. He played the pennywhistle in his youth before switching to the saxophone. He toured with several older musicians, including the Jazz Maniacs, a top South African orchestra, in the mid-1940s. In 1952 several bands in the Johannesburg region sought to cover "Majuba", a song he wrote. That year, Drum magazine wrote that Davashe's "renditions of African themes are the best we have had so far". In 1950 he was leading a group called the Shantytown Sextet, in which Kippie Moeketsi played. Davashe's style at the time was described as similar to that of tenor saxophonist Coleman Hawkins. By the mid-1950s Davashe had developed an interest in bebop, and began collaborating with Dollar Brand (later known as Abdullah Ibrahim). The duo formed the Jazz Epistles, along with Moeketsi, trombone player Jonas Gwangwa and trumpeter Hugh Masekela. Scholar Christopher Merz describes them as quickly becoming the "most highly-regarded jazz group in the country", and remaining so until Brand left for exile in 1962.

In the 1950s, a musical group he led was selected by the Manhattan Brothers as a backing band. Davashe was described as having a considerable influence on the Manhattan Brothers' sound as a composer by bringing in African influences. 'General' Duze, a guitarist for the Manhattan Brothers, stated in 1987 that the band developed a unique, rather than imitative, sound during Davashe's tenure. Miriam Makeba and the Manhattan Brothers recorded Davashe's "Lakutshona Ilanga" in 1956. The song's popularity prompted requests for an English version, and in 1956, Gallotone Records released "Lovely Lies", Makeba's first solo success and first recording in English. In the English version, the Xhosa lyric about a man looking for his beloved in jails and hospitals was replaced with the unrelated and innocuous line "You tell such lovely lies with your two lovely eyes". "Lovely Lies" became the first South African record to chart on the United States Billboard Hot 100. Davashe helped write songs for King Kong, a 1959 Jazz musical.

In the 1960s, Davashe led a group called the Jazz Dazzlers, with whom Moeketsi also worked. The group won the "first prize in the jazz category" at the Cold Castle Jazz Festival in 1962, which had been won the previous year by the Jazz Epistles. Davashe died in 1972 in Soweto due to a stroke.
