= Todd Matshikiza =

South African musician and journalist (1921–1968)

- Born: 7 March 1921; Queenstown, Eastern Cape, South Africa
- Died: 4 March 1968 (aged 46); Lusaka, Zambia
- Education: Adams College; Lovedale Institute
- Occupations: Jazz pianist, composer and journalist
- Known for: Composing the score of the musical King Kong

Todd Tozama Matshikiza OMSS OIG (7 March 1921 – 4 March 1968) was a South African jazz pianist, composer and journalist. As a journalist, he was a contributor to the innovative South African magazine Drum, in which he wrote in a unique style that came to be known as "Matshikese". He is also known for his book "Chocolates for my Wife", an autobiographical account of his experiences in South Africa and England. As a musician, Matshikiza is celebrated for composing the score of the jazz musical King Kong, as well as numerous choral works in South African traditional style, notably "Hamba Kahle". His legacy was celebrated as a Google Doodle on 25 September 2023.

== Early life ==
Born on 7 March 1921, into a musical family in Queenstown, Eastern Cape province, South Africa, Matshikiza was the son of Samuel Bokwe Matshikiza, and Grace Ngqoyi Matshikiza, the seventh of seven children. Grace was a well-known soprano, and his father played the organ in the Anglican Church.

He graduated from St Peter's College in Rosettenville, Johannesburg, and obtained a diploma in music at Adams College in Natal, and teacher's diploma at Lovedale Institute in Alice (1941/42). He stayed on as a teacher at Lovedale, where he taught English and Mathematics at the high school, until 1947. During this period, Matshikiza composed songs and choral works, blending African traditional and European-classical styles; in particular Hamba Kahle, which has become a standard work for choral groups throughout South Africa. It was performed for the arrival of then Princess Elizabeth of the United Kingdom at Bulawayo in 1946, and for the Johannesburg Music Festival in 1950.

== Career in Johannesburg ==
Matshikiza moved to Johannesburg in 1947, and married Esme Sheila Mpama on 26 December 1950. The couple had a daughter, Marian Linda, and son, John Anthony. He taught for a while and founded the Todd Matshikiza School of Music, a private music school, where he taught piano. Although jazz and composing remained his primary interests, to supplement the family income he worked briefly for Vanguard Booksellers in Johannesburg. From 1949 to 1954, Matshikiza was a committee member of the Syndicate of African Artists, which aimed to promote the music of artists from the townships.

In 1952, Matshikiza was invited to join Drum magazine which, under new editorial direction, aimed for a more critical readership. Matshikiza, together with investigative journalist Henry Nxumalo, Ezekiel Mphahlele, Nat Nakasa, Bloke Modisane and others, became one of its early writers. His jazz column covered the township scene, particularly Sophiatown, where he commented on the likes of Kippie Moeketsi and Hugh Masekela, who both played for The Jazz Epistles. Matshikiza covered township life in his regular column "With the Lid Off", and regularly used his biographies of African-American musicians to "explore both racism and its effects". Amongst his close associates, his innovative writing style became known as “Matshikese”, and was characterised by a creative and playful use of syntax and musical style. Drum editor Anthony Sampson, with whom he developed a lifelong friendship, observed later that "Todd transformed Drum. He wrote as he spoke, in a brisk tempo with a rhythm in every sentence. He attacked the typewriter like a piano". Matshikiza also worked briefly for the Golden City Post, a sister publication of Drum with whom it shared offices in Johannesburg and Cape Town.

His love of classical music inspired him to compose the choral piece Makhaliphile (1953), which combined classical, jazz and traditional themes, and was dedicated to Trevor Huddleston who had worked with less-favoured communities in Johannesburg. In 1956, he composed Uxolo! ("Peace"), commissioned for Johannesburg's 70th anniversary. The work's premiere was commemorated with a Google Doodle on 25 September 2023, although research had previously suggested that it was first performed not at the gala concert which took place at Johannesburg City Hall on that day in 1956, but on 13 October of the same year.

In 1958, Matshikiza composed the music and some of the lyrics of the jazz musical King Kong, which had an all-black cast. Portraying the life and times of heavyweight boxer Ezekiel Dlamini, popularly known as “King Kong”, the musical was a hit in 1959. It attracted multi-racial audiences, and was performed in Johannesburg, Cape Town and Port Elizabeth, before opening at the Prince’s Theatre in London’s West End on 23 February 1961. Matshikiza’s interest in the boxer stemmed in part from his having been assigned to cover the trial of Dlamini. King Kong launched the international career of Miriam Makeba, who played the shebeen queen of the Back of the Moon, a shebeen (illicit bar) of the time in Sophiatown.

Matshikiza composed the music for Alan Paton’s play Mkhumbane, which opened to great success in Durban on 29 March 1960, but closed after a few months due to police harassment. The a capella musical recounts the trials of a grass-roots community whose daily lives are affected by forced removal and the actions of gangsters.

== London ==
Frustrated by the apartheid system, and enabled by plans afoot to stage the King Kong musical in London, Matshikiza moved with his wife and two children to England in August 1960. Matshikiza remained in London when most of the cast returned to South Africa. He found it difficult to break into the English music scene, but collaborated with other musicians, playing piano in London jazz venues. He gave lectures on African music and freelanced for publications, including a seminal article which highlighted the radical contribution of Black South African music, in the fight against apartheid. He continued to write for Drum magazine, to which he contributed a monthly column entitled "Todd in London", and worked for the BBC as a presenter and researcher.

His autobiographical book entitled Chocolates for my Wife, recounts his experiences of life in apartheid South Africa and in Britain. The book touches on the black experience, and describes how he was affected by it. In the early 1960s he participated in an international competition to write a national anthem for recently-independent Nigeria, and in a festival in Oran celebrating Algeria’s independence.

== Zambia ==
Missing Africa, in 1964, Matshikiza and his wife were invited to work in newly-independent Zambia, where he became a broadcaster and presenter with Radio Zambia. He took up a position in 1967 as the music archivist for the Zambian Information Service. In this capacity he travelled extensively throughout Zambia, building up the archival collection, and researching Zambian traditional music and instruments. Some of his later music drew inspiration from Zambian traditional songs. He was one of five South African Black artists to perform in the first Zambia Arts Festival, held at Luanshya in May 1965.

Matshikiza remained frustrated at being prevented from returning to South Africa, where his writing had been banned by the government. He died in Lusaka on 4 March 1968. His funeral was attended by numerous dignitaries, including the ANC’s Oliver Tambo, and a Zambian ministerial delegation.

== Family ==
Todd is survived by a daughter, Marian Linda. His son John Matshikiza was a trained actor and worked in film and television; he died on 15 September 2008 in Johannesburg, aged 54. Todd's granddaughter, Lindiwe Matshikiza, is a theatre actress and director.

== Books ==
- Chocolates for My Wife, Todd Matshikiza, Hodder & Stoughton, 1961. David Philip Publishers, 1982, ISBN 0-908396-83-X
- With the Lid Off: South African Insights from Home and Abroad, 1959-2000, T. Matshikiza J. Matshikiza., M&G Books, ISBN 0-620-26244-3

== Sources ==
- Thorpe, Andrea (2021). "Swinging City: Todd Matshikiza's Contrapuntal London Writing". South African London: Writing the Metropolis After 1948. Manchester: Manchester University Press. pp. 93–139. ISBN 9781526148551.
