= Sathima Bea Benjamin =

South African vocalist and composer (1936–2013)

Sathima Bea Benjamin OIS
- c. 1958–59

Background information
- Born: Beatrice Benjamin; 17 October 1936; Claremont, Cape Town, South Africa
- Died: 20 August 2013 (aged 76) Cape Town
- Genres: South African jazz, vocal jazz, soul jazz
- Occupations: Musician, composer, lyricist
- Instrument: Vocals
- Years active: 1955–2013
- Label: ekapa
- Formerly of: Jean Grae, Abdullah Ibrahim, Buster Williams, Onaje Allan Gumbs
- Website: sathimabeabenjamin.com
- Spouse: Abdullah Ibrahim (m. 1965)
- Children: Two, inc. Jean Grae

Beatrice "Sathima Bea" Benjamin (17 October 1936 – 20 August 2013) was a South African vocalist and composer based in New York City for nearly 45 years.

== Early life ==
She was born Beatrice Bertha Benjamin in Claremont, Cape Town, South Africa. Her father, Edward Benjamin, was from the island of St. Helena off the coast of West Africa, and her mother, Evelyn Henry, had roots in Mauritius and the Philippines. As an adolescent, Benjamin first performed popular music in talent contests at the local cinema (bioscope) during the intermission. By the 1950s she was singing at various nightclubs, community dances and social events, performing with notable Cape Town pianists Tony Schilder and Henry February, among others. She built her repertoire watching British and American movies and transcribing lyrics from songs heard on the radio, where she discovered Nat King Cole, Billie Holiday, Doris Day, Ella Fitzgerald. These musicians would come to influence her singing style, notably in terms of light phrasing and clear diction.

At the age of 21, she joined Arthur Klugman's travelling show Coloured Jazz and Variety on a tour of South Africa. When the production failed, she found herself stranded in Mozambique, where she met South African saxophonist Kippie Moeketsi. In 1959, she returned to Cape Town's now thriving jazz scene, where she met pianist Dollar Brand (later known as Abdullah Ibrahim), whom she married in 1965. In that same year, she recorded what would have been the first jazz LP in South Africa's history. Entitled My Songs for You, with accompaniment by Ibrahim's trio, the recording of mostly standards was never released.

== Sharpeville Massacre and Europe ==
In the aftermath of South Africa's Sharpeville Massacre of 1960, Benjamin and Ibrahim left South Africa for Europe. The couple, along with Ibrahim's trio of bassist Johnny Gertze and drummer Makhaya Ntshoko, settled in Zurich, Switzerland, and worked throughout Germany and Scandinavia, meeting and occasionally performing with American jazz players, including Don Byas, Dexter Gordon, Kenny Drew, Ben Webster, Bud Powell, John Coltrane, and Thelonious Monk. The artist who would have the greatest impact on Benjamin's life, however, was Duke Ellington.

== Duke Ellington ==
Benjamin met Duke Ellington while he was in Zurich in 1963. She stood in the wings during most of his band's performance, and once the concert ended she insisted that Ellington hear her husband's trio at the Club Africana, where Ibrahim's band had a standing engagement. Ellington obliged, but insisted that Benjamin sing for him. Following this encounter, Ellington arranged for the couple to fly to Paris and record separate albums for Frank Sinatra's Reprise label, for whom Ellington functioned as Artists and Repertoire representative. Ibrahim's record, Duke Ellington Presents The Dollar Brand Trio, was released the following year and subsequently helped him build a following in Europe and the United States. Benjamin's recording, however, remained unreleased and was presumed to be lost until its release in 1996 by Enja Records, under the title A Morning in Paris. The session's engineer, Gerhard Lerner, had surreptitiously made a second copy.

Benjamin maintained her musical relationship with Ellington. In 1965, he arranged to have her perform with his band in the U.S. at the Newport Jazz Festival (where she sang the Ellington ballad "Solitude"), and at one point asked her to join his band permanently. Due to her recent marriage to Ibrahim that same year, Benjamin declined the offer.

== South Africa, America, and Ekapa ==
Throughout the 1960s, Benjamin and Ibrahim moved back and forth between Europe and New York City, as Ibrahim worked to establish his career. Benjamin spent much of the period as a manager and agent for her husband while raising their son, Tsakwe. The year 1976 marked a turning point for Benjamin. She and Ibrahim returned to South Africa to live; she gave birth to her daughter, Tsidi (now the underground hip-hop artist Jean Grae); and recorded African Songbird, an album of original compositions, for South Africa's Gallo Records. Shortly after Tsidi's birth, the family relocated to New York city in 1977, to the famed Hotel Chelsea.

In 1979, Benjamin started a record label Ekapa to produce and distribute her and Ibrahim's music. Between 1979 and 2002, she released eight of her albums on Ekapa, including Sathima Sings Ellington, Dedications, Memories and Dreams, Windsong, Lovelight, Southern Touch, Cape Town Love, and Musical Echoes.

Dedications was nominated for a Grammy Award in 1982. Benjamin's collaborators on these albums have included saxophonist Carlos Ward, pianists Stephen Scott, Kenny Barron, Larry Willis and Onaje Allan Gumbs, bassist Buster Williams and drummers Billy Higgins and Ben Riley. For the most part, Benjamin has used American musicians for her U.S. recordings and South African musicians when in Cape Town. Her 2002 recording, Musical Echoes, featured American pianist Stephen Scott with two South Africans, bassist Basil Moses and drummer Lulu Gontsana.

== Later career ==
In 2000, Danish second-hand book dealer and fan of South African jazz Lars Rasmussen published a collection of essays and a discography of Benjamin's music in Sathima Bea Benjamin: Embracing Jazz (Copenhagen, 2000). It contains two compact discs of Benjamin's music: Cape Town Love and an Embracing Jazz compilation with photographs.

In October 2004, South African president Thabo Mbeki gave her the Order of Ikhamanga Silver Award for "excellent contribution as a jazz artist" and for her contribution "to the struggle against apartheid." In March 2005, the art group Pen and Brush, Inc. presented her with a Certificate of Achievement for her work as a performer, musician, composer, and "activist in the struggle for human rights in South Africa". Benjamin was profiled in the March 2006 issue of JazzTimes.

Her album SongSpirit was released on 17 October 2006 in celebration of her 70th birthday. A compilation record, it includes tracks from her earlier albums, plus a previously unreleased duet with Abdullah Ibrahim from 1973.

In 2007, Benjamin began reissuing her back catalogue for download. Cape Town Love, released 19 June, began the process, while A Morning in Paris was reissued in October 2007 to mark her 71st birthday. It was released for download on 16 October, and reissued on CD on 22 January 2008.

In December 2008, she performed at the Apollo Theater at the closing of the concert Bricktop at the Apollo, hosted by film director Jordan Walker-Pearlman. She sang "Someone to Watch Over Me".

In 2010, she was the subject of the documentary Sathima's Windsong, directed by author and professor Daniel Yon.

In 2011, Duke University Press published Musical Echoes: South African Women Thinking in Jazz, which was written by Benjamin and Carol Muller, a South African ethnomusicologist, over the course of twenty years.

Benjamin returned to Cape Town in 2011, where she continued to work as a vocalist. She died on 20 August 2013 at the age of 76.

== Scholarship about Sathima Bea Benjamin ==
Ethnomusicologists and others have studied her life and her music. The most prolific of these researchers has been Carol A. Muller.

- Muller, Carol Ann, Sathima Bea Benjamin, and Sathima Bea Benjamin. Musical echoes: South African women thinking in jazz. Duke University Press, 2020.
- Muller, Carol Ann. "Capturing the" Spirit of Africa" in the Jazz Singing of South African-Born Sathima Bea Benjamin." Research in African Literatures 32, no. 2 (2001): 133-152.
- Muller, Carol. "Sathima Bea Benjamin, exile and the ‘Southern Touch’in Jazz creation and performance." African Languages and Cultures 9, no. 2 (1996): 127-143.
- Muller, Carol. "Sathima Bea Benjamin." Women Singers in Global Contexts: Music, Biography, Identity, edited by Ruth Hellier 161-176. University of Illinois Press. (2013):
- Muller, Carol A. "Sathima Bea Benjamin’s Cape Town: Popular Culture in the Post-World War II Era." In Focus: Music of South Africa, pp. 193-204. Routledge, 2010.
- Muller, Carol A. "First Case Study: Cape Jazz Post-World War II Cape Town." In Focus: Music of South Africa, pp. 157-171. Routledge, 2008.
- Placksin, Sally. "Sathima: Music is the spirit within you." Women and Performance: A Journal of Feminist Theory, 2/3 (1984): 21–31.

== Discography ==
- African Songbird with Dollar Brand (The Sun, 1976)
- Sathima Sings Ellington (Ekapa, 1979)
- Dedications (Ekapa, 1982)
- WindSong with Kenny Barron, Buster Williams, Billy Higgins (Ekapa, 1985)
- Memories and Dreams (Ekapa, 1986)
- LoveLight (Ekapa, 1988)
- Southern Touch (Enja, 1989)
- A Morning in Paris (Enja, 1997)
- Musical Echoes (Ekapa, 2002)
- Cape Town Love (Ekapa, 2003)
- Song Spirit (Ekapa, 2006)
