= JAPO Records =

Record label

- Parent company: ECM Records
- Founded: 1970
- Defunct: 1985
- Genre: Jazz
- Country of origin: Germany
- Location: Munich

JAPO Records was a German record label founded in 1970 that specialized in jazz. It was a division of ECM Records. JAPO stands for Jazz by Post. The label existed from 1970 until 1985 and produced over 40 jazz fusion and free jazz records from musicians all over the world, the majority of them European. It was based in Munich, Germany.

== History ==
JAPO's catalogue includes Dollar Brand, Mal Waldron, Elton Dean, George Gruntz, Barry Guy, Alfred Harth, Ken Hyder, Herbert Joos, Bobby Naughton, Manfred Schoof, Barre Phillips, Jiří Stivín & Rudolf Dašek, Stephan Micus, Enrico Rava, Lennart Åberg, Edward Vesala, and the Globe Unity Orchestra.

== Production ==
Production for the label was overseen by musicians and established producers, and included work by Jack DeJohnette, Manfred Eicher, and Håken Elmquist. Many of the records were produced by Thomas Stöwsand.

== Engineering ==
The engineering for the recording sessions was carried out by established recording engineers from Germany and Norway. Some of them, like Martin Wieland and Jan Erik Kongshaug had already worked with Manfred Eicher at ECM Records, which was one of Germany's most progressive jazz record labels at the time and had musicians like Jan Garbarek, Dave Holland, Chick Corea, and Keith Jarrett on its roster.

== Legacy ==
Most of the JAPO catalogue was originally released on LP and many of the titles have yet to be re-issued on CD or any other format, although reissues have been seen as recently as 2006.
