= Manhattan Brothers =

South African singing group

The Manhattan Brothers was a popular South African singing group in the 1940s and 1950s, during the Apartheid era. Their sound drew on American ragtime, jive, swing, doo-wop, and several other jazz strains, as well as African choral and Zulu harmonies.

Members of the group included Nathan Dambuza Mdledle (leader and founder), Joe Mogotsi, Ronnie Sehume, Rufus Khoza,and Miriam Makeba. Makeba, who went on to international fame, started her career with The Manhattan Brothers and was part of the group for much of the 1950s. In the 1950s, the Manhattan Brothers chose as their backing band a musical group led by Mackay Davashe. Band guitarist General Duze said that composer Davashe helped the Manhattan Brothers develop a unique, personal style by bringing in African influences

The group had one US Billboard pop chart hit, "Lovely Lies", which peaked at number 45 in March 1956. The original Xhosa version of the song was written by Davashe. Its popularity led to requests for an English version, which became the first South African piece on the Billboard Hot 100.
