= The Crossing (Osiyeza) =

Song by Johnny Clegg

from the album Heat, Dust and Dreams
- Released: 1993
- Recorded: 1992
- Genre: World music
- Length: 4:57
- Label: Capitol
- Producers: Hilton Rosenthal, Bobby Summerfield

"The Crossing (Osiyeza)" is the second track from the South African band Savuka's fourth and final studio album Heat, Dust and Dreams. Written by Johnny Clegg, the song was dedicated as a tribute to band member Dudu Zulu, who was shot dead during a period of violence in Greytown in 1993.

== Background ==
In May 1992, Dudu Zulu, who had been part of Savuka since its inception, and part of Juluka, its predecessor band, was gunned down while intervening in a disagreement between taxi groups near Greytown in the then province of Natal. Clegg wrote "The Crossing (Osiyeza)" in response. His lyrics referred to crossing from life to death, or to the spiritual world from the physical, but were also a metaphor for South Africa's ongoing transition from apartheid to democracy. Death had been an increasingly prominent theme in Clegg and Savuka's music in the 1980s. Clegg said in later years that performing the song helped him process Zulu's passing.

== Release and performances ==
"The Crossing (Osiyeza)" was released as the second track from Savuka's fourth and final studio album Heat, Dust and Dreams. The album was produced by Bobby Summerfield and Hilton Rosenthal.

The track was covered on the soundtrack of the 2009 sports drama film Invictus, performed by the South African a cappella group Overtone led by Yorlandi Nortjie.

Friends of Johnny Clegg, a musical group and charity created to honour Clegg, recorded a cover version in 2018 that featured over 50 artists, notably Clegg's son, Jesse, and Peter Gabriel. Jesse would rerecord The Crossing for his 2026 album, Scatterlings (Johnny Clegg Reimagined). The album consisted of rerecorded versions of Clegg's songs, along with The Crossing, other songs recorded were Asimbonanga (Mandela), Great Heart and Scatterlings of Africa.

== Sources ==
- Drewett, Michael; Spini, Lucilla (2025). Johnny Clegg: Critical Reflections on His Music and Influence. Wits University Press. ISBN 978-1-77614-964-3.
