= Music in the movement against apartheid =

One of the methods of opposition used against the apartheid regime

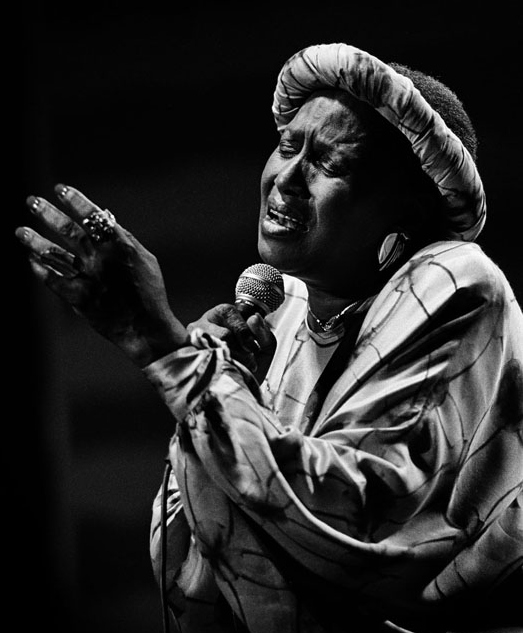
South African singer Miriam Makeba popularised a number of songs that protested apartheid.

The apartheid regime in South Africa began in 1948 and lasted until 1994. It involved a system of institutionalized racial segregation, violence, terror, and white supremacy, and placed all political power in the hands of a white minority. Opposition to apartheid manifested in a variety of ways, including boycotts, non-violent protests, and armed resistance. Music played a large role in the movement against apartheid within South Africa, as well as in international opposition to apartheid. The impacts of songs opposing apartheid included raising awareness, generating support for the movement against apartheid, building unity within this movement, and "presenting an alternative vision of culture in a future democratic South Africa."

The lyrical content and tone of this music reflected the atmosphere that it was composed in. The protest music of the 1950s, soon after apartheid had begun, explicitly addressed peoples' grievances over pass laws and forced relocation. Following the Sharpeville massacre in 1960 and the arrest or exile of a number of leaders, songs became more downbeat, while increasing censorship forced them to use subtle and hidden meanings. Songs and performance also allowed people to circumvent the more stringent restrictions on other forms of expression. At the same time, songs played a role in the more militant resistance that began in the 1960s. The Soweto uprising in 1976 led to a renaissance, with songs such as "Soweto Blues" encouraging a more direct challenge to the apartheid government. This trend intensified in the 1980s, with racially mixed fusion bands testing the laws of apartheid, before these were dismantled with the release of Nelson Mandela in 1990 and the eventual restoration of majority rule in 1994. Anti-apartheid music within South Africa faced significant censorship from the government, including through the South African Broadcasting Corporation; additionally, musicians opposing the government faced threats, harassment, and arrests.

Musicians from other countries also participated in the resistance to apartheid, both by releasing music critical of the South African government, and by participating in a cultural boycott of South Africa from 1980 onward. Examples included "Biko" by Peter Gabriel, "Sun City" by Artists United Against Apartheid and a concert in honour of Nelson Mandela's 70th birthday. Prominent South African musicians such as Miriam Makeba and Hugh Masekela, forced into exile, also released music critical of apartheid. This music had a significant impact on Western popular culture, contributing to the "moral outrage" over apartheid. Scholars have stated that anti-apartheid music within South Africa, although it received less attention worldwide, played an equally important role in putting pressure on the South African government.

== Background and origins ==
Racial segregation in South Africa began with the arrival of Dutch colonists in South Africa in 1652, and continued through centuries of British rule. Racial separation increased greatly after the British took complete control over South Africa in the late 19th century, and passed many laws in the early 1900s to separate racial groups. The 1923 Natives (Urban Areas) Act forced black South Africans to leave cities unless they were there to work for white people, and excluded them from any role in the government. The system of apartheid was implemented by the Afrikaner National Party (NP) after they were voted into power in 1948, and remained in place for 46 years. The white minority held all political power during this time. "Apartheid" meant "separateness" in the Afrikaans language, and involved a brutal system of racial segregation. Black South Africans were compelled to live in poor townships, and were denied basic human rights, based on the idea that South Africa belonged to white people. A prominent figure in the implementation of the apartheid laws was Hendrik Verwoerd, who was first Minister for Native Affairs and later Prime Minister in the NP government.

This system faced significant resistance both within and outside South Africa. Opposition outside the country often took the form of boycotts of South Africa. Within the country, resistance ranged from loosely organised groups to tightly knit ones, and from non-violent protests to armed opposition from the African National Congress. Music played a large role in this resistance. Music had been used in South Africa to protest racial segregation before apartheid began in 1948. The ANC, founded in 1912, would begin and end its meetings with its anthem "Nkosi Sikelel' iAfrika", an early example of music in the resistance to racial segregation. R. T. Caluza's "iLand Act", which protested the Native Land Act, was also adopted as an anthem by the ANC. Commentator Michela Vershbow writes that the music of the movement against apartheid and racial segregation "reflected [the] widening gap" between racial groups and was also an attempt "to communicate across it". Music in South Africa began to have explicitly political overtones in the 1930s, as musicians tried to include African elements in their recordings and performances to make political statements. In the 1940s, artists began to use music to criticise the state, not directly in response to racial segregation, but as a response to persecution of artists. Artists did not see their music as being directly political: Miriam Makeba would state "people say I sing politics, but what I sing is not politics, it is the truth".

== South African music ==
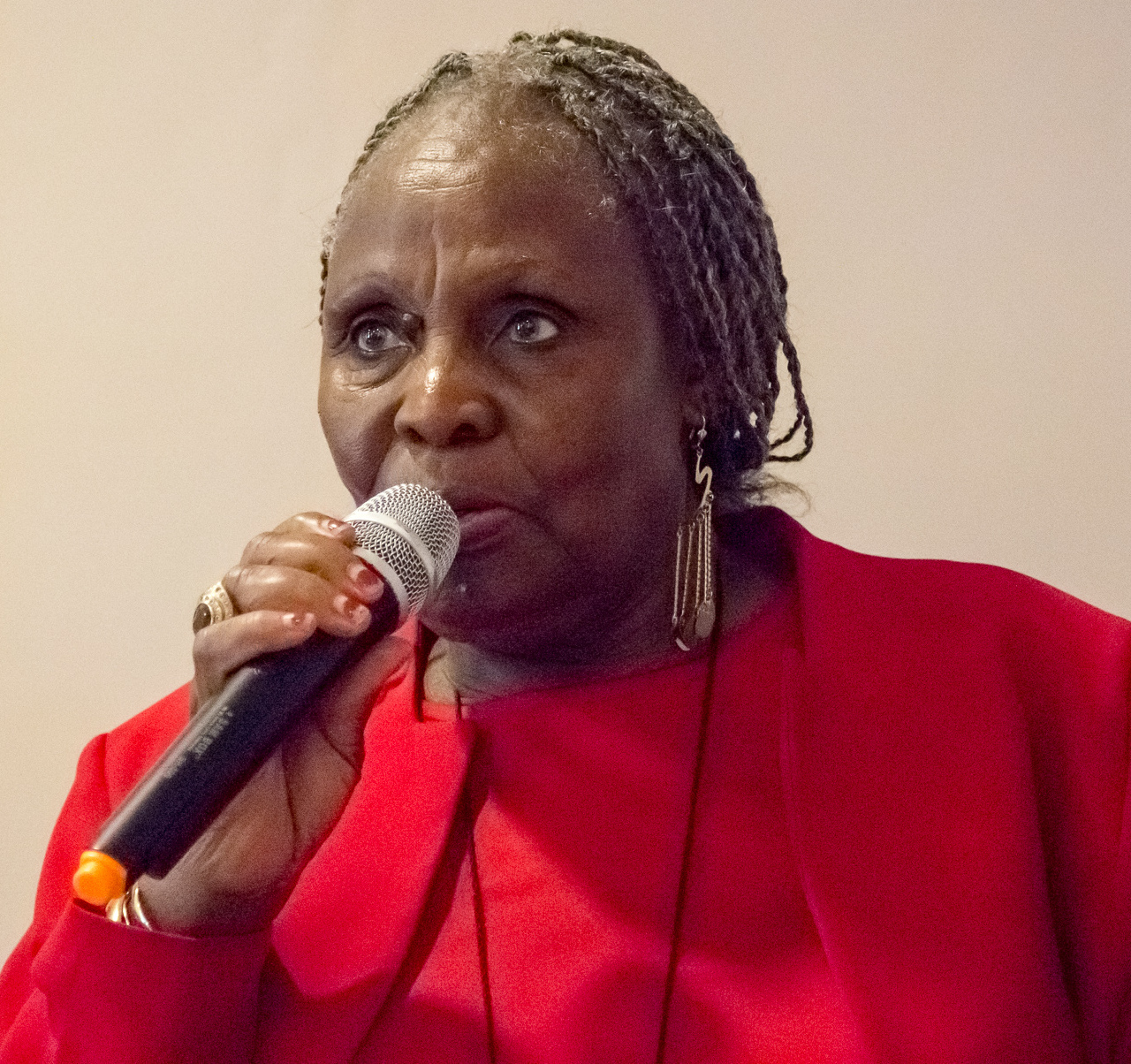
Singer Dorothy Masuka (pictured here in 2015), who wrote "uDr. Malan Unomthetho Onzima" (Dr. Malan's Government is Harsh)

=== 1950s: Pass laws and resettlement ===
As the apartheid government became entrenched in the 1950s, musicians came to see their music as more political in nature, led partly by a campaign of the African National Congress to increase its support. ANC activist and trade unionist Vuyisile Mini was among the pioneers of using music to protest apartheid. He penned "Ndodemnyama we Verwoerd" ("Watch Out, Verwoerd"), in Xhosa. Poet Jeremy Cronin stated that Mini was the embodiment of the power that songs had built within the protest movement. Mini was arrested in 1963 for "political crimes," and sentenced to death; fellow inmates described him as singing "Ndodemnyama" as he went to the gallows. The song achieved enduring popularity, being sung until well after the apartheid government had collapsed by artists such as Makeba and Afrika Bambaataa. Protest songs became more popular during the 1950s, as a number of musicians began to voice explicit opposition to apartheid. "uDr. Malan Unomthetho Onzima" (Dr. Malan's Government is Harsh) by Dorothy Masuka became well-known, as did a number of songs by other women composers written as part of a campaign against carrying passes, which required black citizens to carry a document at all times showing their racial and tribal identity.

In 1954 the NP government passed the Bantu Resettlement Act, which, along with the 1950 Group Areas Act, forcibly moved millions of South Africans into townships in racially segregated zones. This was part of a plan to divide the country into a number of smaller regions, including tiny, impoverished bantustans where the black people were to live. In 1955, the settlement of Sophiatown was destroyed, and its 60,000 inhabitants moved, many to a settlement known as Meadowlands. Sophiatown had been a center of African jazz music prior to the relocation. The move was the inspiration for the song "Meadowlands", by Strike Vilakezi. As with many other songs of the time, it was popularised both within and outside the country by Miriam Makeba. Makeba's song "Sophiatown is Gone" also referred to the relocation from Sophiatown, as did "Bye Bye Sophiatown" by the Sun Valley Sisters. Music not directly related to the movement was also often harnessed during this period: the South African Communist Party would use such music for its fundraising dances, and the song "Udumo Lwamaphoyisa" (A Strong Police Force) was sung by lookouts to provide warnings of police presence and liquor raids.

=== 1960s: Sharpeville massacre and militancy ===
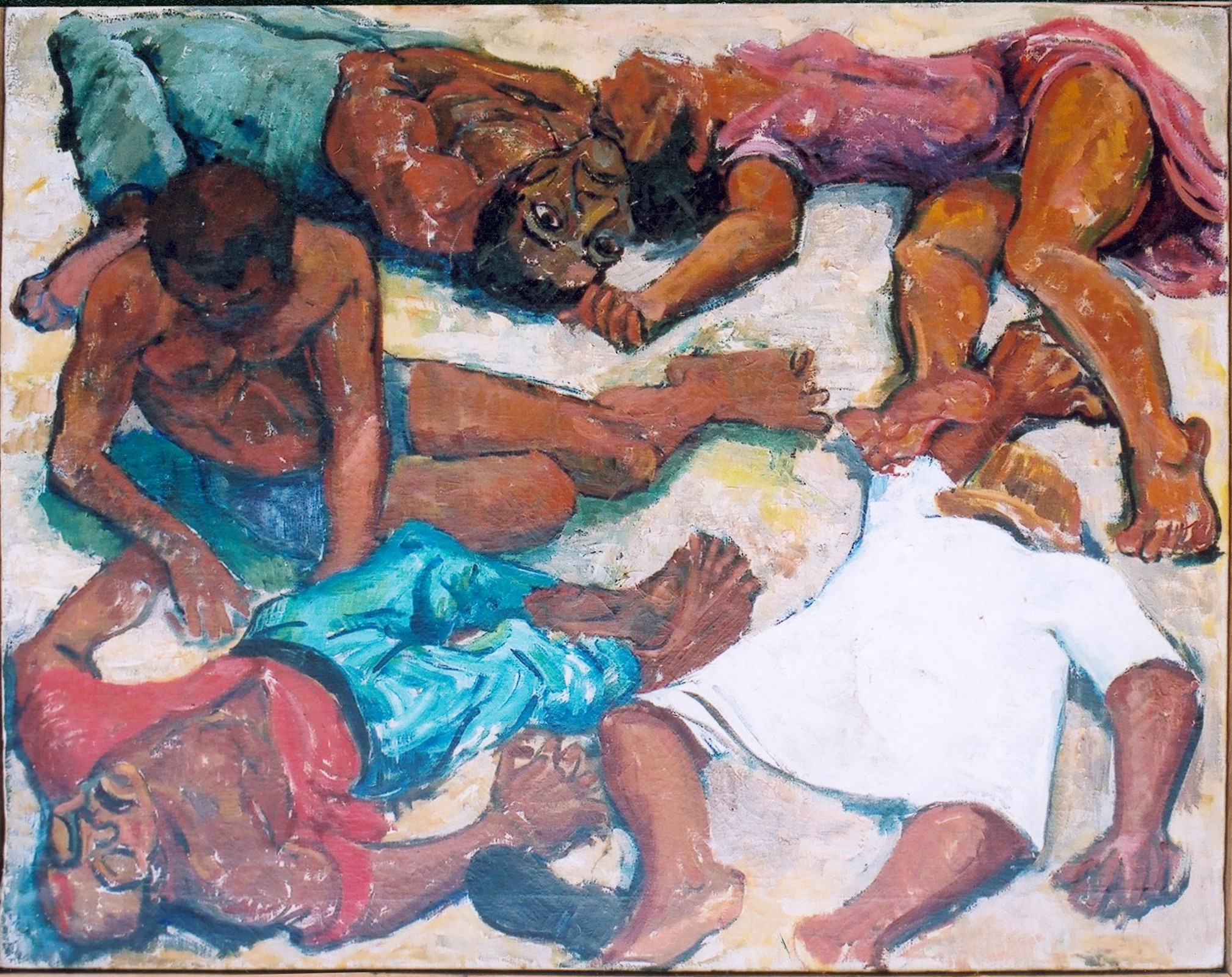
A painting of the Sharpeville Massacre of March 1960

The Sharpeville massacre occurred on 21 March 1960, and in its aftermath apartheid was intensified and political dissent increasingly suppressed. The ANC and the Pan Africanist Conference were banned, and 169 black leaders were tried for treason. A number of musicians, including Makeba, Hugh Masekela, Abdullah Ibrahim, Jonas Gwangwa, Chris McGregor, and Kippie Moeketsie went into exile. Some, such as Makeba and Masekela, began using their music to raise awareness of apartheid. Those musicians that remained found their activities constrained. The new townships that black people had been moved to lacked facilities for recreation, and large gatherings of people were banned. The South African Broadcasting Corporation tightened its broadcasting guidelines, preventing "subversive" music from being aired. A recording by Masuka referring to the killing of Patrice Lumumba led to a raid on her studio and her being declared a wanted individual, preventing her from living in South Africa for the next 30 years.

The new townships that black people were moved to, despite their "dreary" nature, also inspired politically charged music, a trend which continued into the 1970s. "In Soweto" by The Minerals has been described as an "infectious celebration of a place" and of the ability of its residents to build a community there. Yakhal' Inkhomo ("The Bellowing of the Bull", 1968), by Winston "Mankunku" Ngozi, was a jazz anthem that also expressed the political energy of the period. Theatrical performances incorporating music were also a feature of the townships, often narrowly avoiding censorship. The cultural isolation forced by apartheid led to artists within South Africa creating local adaptations of popular genres, including rock music, soul, and jazz.

As the government became increasingly harsh in its response to growing protests, the resistance shifted from being completely non-violent towards armed action. Nelson Mandela and other ANC leaders founded the uMkhonto we Sizwe (MK), a militant wing of the ANC, which began a campaign of sabotage. During this period, music was often referred to as a "weapon of struggle." Among MK members in training camps, a song called "Sobashiy'abazali" ("We Will Leave Our Parents") became very popular, invoking as it did the pain of leaving their homes. The Toyi-toyi chant also became popular during this period, and was frequently used to generate a sense of power among large groups to intimidate government troops.

=== 1970s: ANC cultural groups and Soweto uprising ===
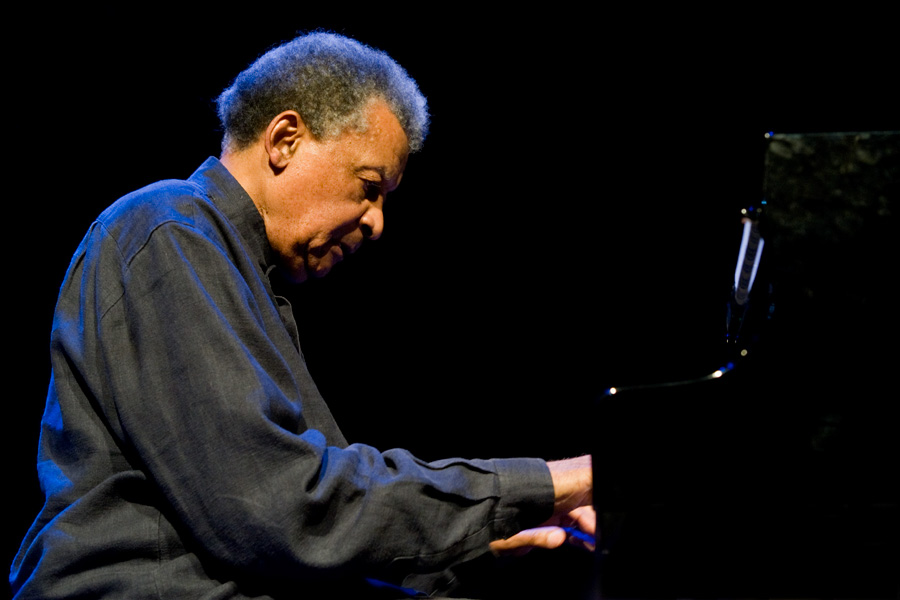
Jazz pianist Abdullah Ibrahim (pictured here in 2011) composed "Mannenberg", an instrumental piece that invoked themes of freedom and cultural identity.

In the early 1970s, the ANC held to the belief that its primary activity was political organising, and that any cultural activity was secondary to this. This belief began to shift with the establishment of the Mayibuye Cultural Ensemble in 1975, and the Amandla Cultural Ensemble later in the 1970s. Mayibuye was established as a growing number of ANC activists argued that cultural events needed to form a part of their work, and could be used to raise awareness of apartheid, gather support, and drive political change. The group was established by ANC activists Barry Feinberg and Ronnie Kasrils, who named it after the slogan Mayibuye iAfrika (Let Africa Return). The group consisted of several South African performers, and used a mixture of songs, poetry, and narrative in their performance, which described life under the apartheid government and their struggle against it. The songs were often performed in three- or four-part harmony. The group performed more than 200 times across Europe, and were seen as the cultural arm of the ANC. The group experienced personal and organisational difficulties, and disbanded in 1980.

In 1976 the government of South Africa decided to implement the use of Afrikaans as the medium of instruction in all schools instead of English. In response, high school students began a series of protests that came to be known as the Soweto Uprising. 15,000–20,000 students took part; the police, caught unprepared, opened fire on the protesting children. 700 people were estimated to have been killed, and over a thousand injured. The killings sparked months of rioting in the Soweto townships and became an important moment for the anti-Apartheid movement. Hugh Masekela wrote Soweto Blues in response to the massacre, and the song was performed by Miriam Makeba, becoming a standard part of Makeba's live performances for many years. "Soweto Blues" was one of many melancholic songs composed by Masekela during this period that expressed his support of the anti-apartheid struggle, along with "Been Gone Far Too Long," "Mama," and "The Coal Train." Songs written after the Soweto uprising were generally political in nature, but used hidden meaning to avoid suppression, especially as the movement against apartheid gained momentum. A song by the band Juluka used a metaphor of fighting bulls to suggest the fall of apartheid. Many songs of this period became so widely known that their lyrics were frequently altered and adapted depending on the circumstances, making their authorship collective. Pianist Abdullah Ibrahim used purely musical techniques to convey subversive messages, by incorporating melodies from freedom songs into his improvisations. Ibrahim also composed "Mannenberg", described as the "most powerful anthem of the struggle in the 1980s", which had no lyrics but drew on a number of aspects of black South African culture, including church music, jazz, marabi, and blues, to create a piece that conveyed a sense of freedom and cultural identity.

The importance of the anti-apartheid movement among South African exiles increased in the late 1970s, driven partly by the activities of Mayibuye. The Amandla Cultural Ensemble drew together among militant ANC activities living in Angola and elsewhere in this period, influenced by Mayibuye, as well as the World Black Festival of Arts and Culture that was held in Nigeria in 1977. As with Mayibuye, the group tried to use their performances to raise awareness and generate support for the ANC; however, they relied chiefly on new material composed by their own members, such as Jonas Gwangwa. Popular songs performed by the group were selected for or adapted to a militaristic and faster tone and tempo; at the same time, the tenor of the groups performance tended to be more affirmative, and less antagonistic and sarcastic, than that of Mayibuye. Members often struggled to balance their commitments to the ensemble with their military activities, which were often seen as their primary job; some, such as Nomkhosi Mini, daughter of Vuyisile Mini, were killed in military action while they were performing with Amandla. Such artists also faced pressure to use their performance solely in the service of the political movement, without monetary reward. Amandla had carefully crafted performances of music and theater, with a much larger ensemble than Mayibuye, which included a jazz band. The influence of these groups would last beyond the 1970s: a "Culture and Resistance" conference was held in Botswana in 1982, and the ANC established a "Department of Arts and Culture" in 1985.

=== 1980s: Direct confrontation ===
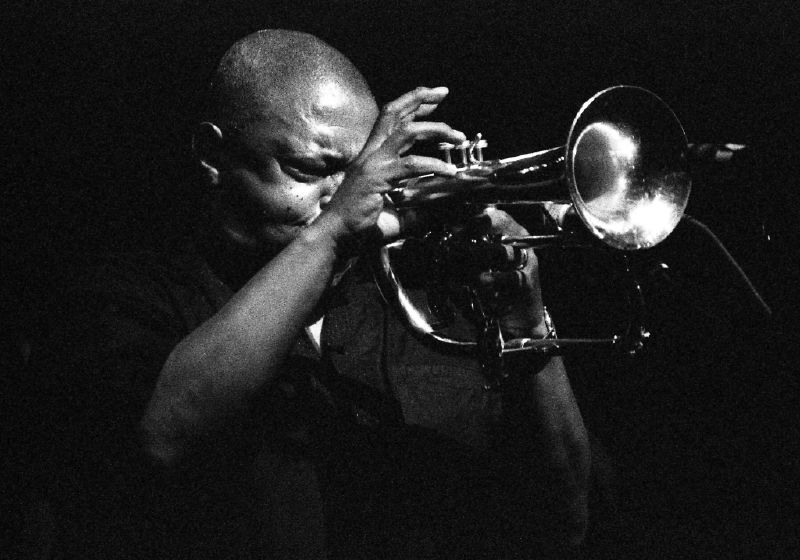
Musician Hugh Masekela, who composed the hugely popular "Bring Him Back Home" after receiving a letter from Nelson Mandela

The 1980s saw increasing protests against apartheid by black organisations such as the United Democratic Front. Protest music once again became directly critical of the state; examples included "Longile Tabalaza" by Roger Lucey, which attacked the secret police through lyrics about a young man who is arrested by the police and dies in custody. Protesters in the 1980s took to the streets with the intention of making the country "ungovernable", and the music reflected this new militancy. Major protests took place after the inauguration of a "Tri-cameral" parliament (which had separate representation for Indians, Colored people, and white South Africans, but not for black South Africans) in 1984, and in 1985 the government declared a state of emergency. The music became more radical and more urgent as the protests grew in size and number, now frequently invoking and praising the guerrilla movements that had gained steam after the Soweto uprising. The song "Shona Malanga" (Sheila's Day), originally about domestic workers, was adapted to refer to the guerrilla movement. The Toyi-toyi was once again used in confrontations with government forces.

The Afrikaner-dominated government sought to counter these with increasingly frequent states of emergency. During this period, only a few Afrikaners expressed sentiments against apartheid. The Voëlvry movement among Afrikaners began in the 1980s in response with the opening of Shifty Mobile Recording Studio. Voëlvry sought to express opposition to apartheid in Afrikaans. The goal of Voëlvry musicians was to persuade Afrikaner youth of the changes their culture had to undergo to achieve racial equality. Prominent members in this phenomenon were Ralph Rabie, under the stage name Johannes Kerkorrel, Andre du Toit, and Bernoldus Niemand. Racially integrated bands playing various kinds of fusion became more common as the 1980s progressed; their audiences came from across racial lines, itself a subversive act, as racial segregation was still embedded in the law. The racially mixed Juluka, led by Johnny Clegg, remained popular through the 1970s and early 1980s. The government tried to harness this popularity by sponsoring a multi-lingual song titled "Together We Will Build a Brighter Future," but the release, during a period of great political unrest, caused further anger at the government, and protests forced the song to be withdrawn before commercial sales were made.

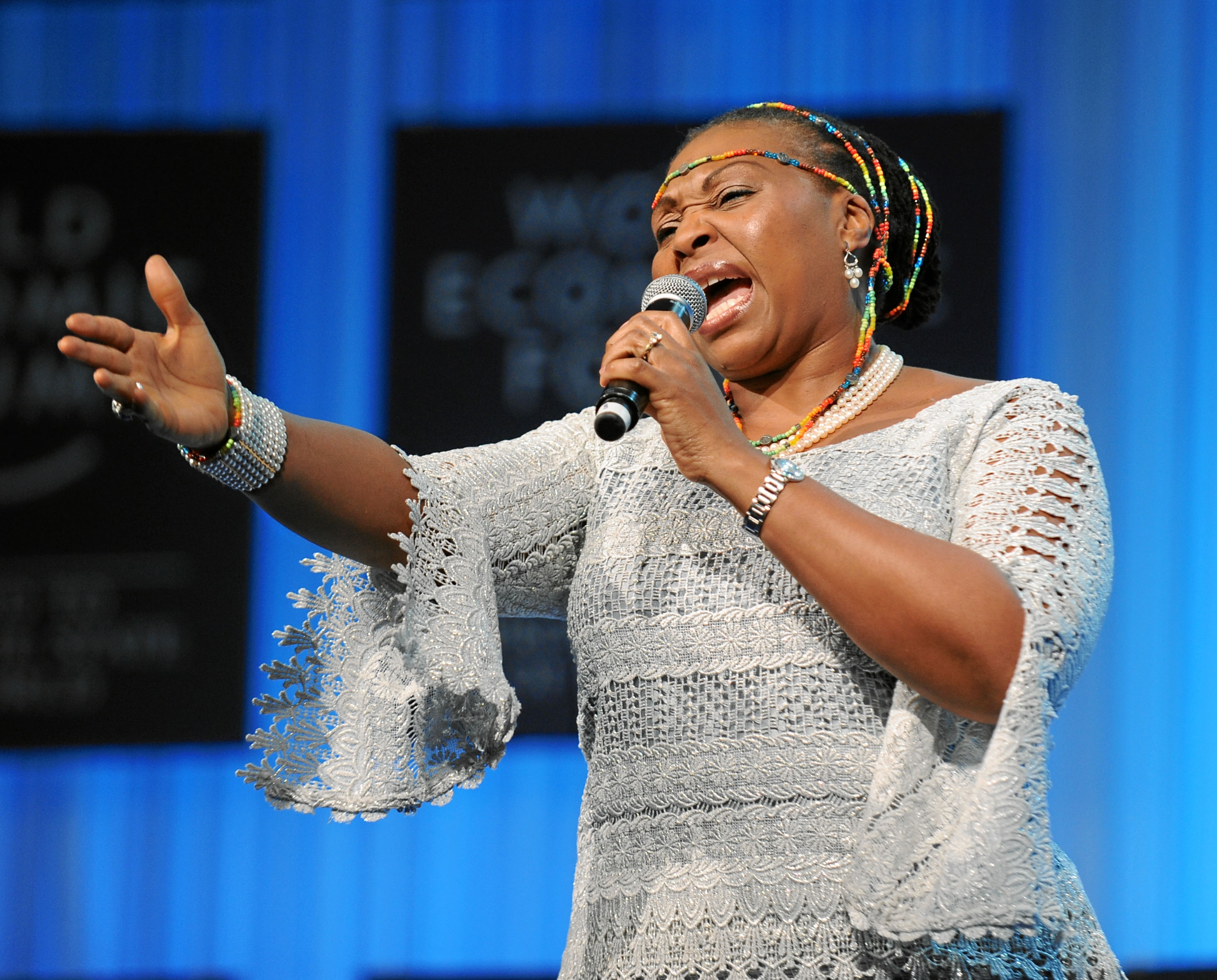
Singer Yvonne Chaka Chaka (pictured in 2012) was among the many musicians featured on the "peace song" released to celebrate the release of Nelson Mandela in 1990

Among the most popular anti-apartheid songs in South Africa was "Bring Him Back Home (Nelson Mandela)" by Hugh Masekela. Nelson Mandela was a great fan of Masekela's music, and on Masekela's birthday in 1985, smuggled out a letter to him expressing his good wishes. Masekela was inspired to write "Bring Him Back Home" in response. Sam Raditlhalo writes that the reception of Mandela's letter, and the writing of Bring Him Back Home, marked Masekela being labelled an anti-apartheid activist. Mandela was also invoked in "Black President" by Brenda Fassie; composed in 1988, this song explicitly invoked Mandela's eventual presidency. Mandela was released in 1990 and went on a post-freedom tour of North America with Winnie. In Boston, he danced as "Bring Him Back Home" was played after his speech. Mandela's release triggered a number of celebratory songs. These included a "peace song", composed by Chicco Twala, and featuring a number of artists, including Masekela, Fassie, and Yvonne Chaka Chaka. The proceeds from this piece went to the "Victims of Violence" fund. Majority rule was restored to South Africa in 1994, ending the period of apartheid.

== Outside South Africa ==
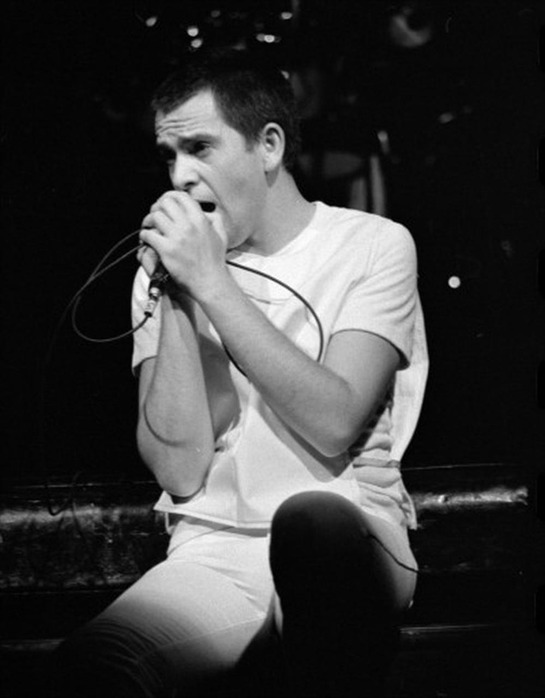
Peter Gabriel (pictured here in 1978) wrote "Biko", the most famous of the songs inspired by the death of Steve Biko in police custody.

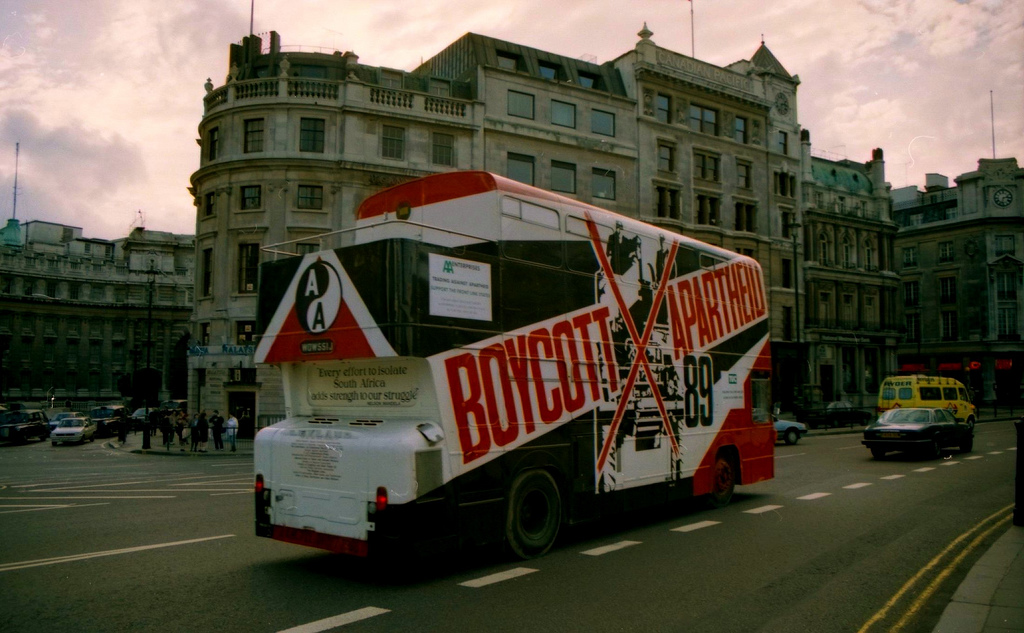
A bus in London, in the UK, with the slogan "Boycott Apartheid" painted on it, in 1989

Musicians from other countries also participated in resistance to apartheid. Several musicians from Europe and North America refused to perform in South Africa during the apartheid regime: these included The Beatles, The Rolling Stones, and the Walker Brothers. After the Sharpeville massacre in 1960, the Musicians' Union in the UK announced a boycott of the government. The first South African activist to receive widespread attention outside South Africa was Steve Biko when he died in police custody in 1977. His death inspired a number of songs from artists outside the country, including from Tom Paxton and Peter Hammill. The most famous of these was the song "Biko" by Peter Gabriel. U2 lead singer Bono was among the people who said that the song inspired him. Musicians from other parts of Africa also wrote songs to support the movement; Nigeria's Sonny Okosun drew attention to apartheid with songs such as "Fire in Soweto", described by the Los Angeles Times as an "incendiary reggae jam".

=== Cultural boycott ===
A cultural boycott of the apartheid government had been suggested in 1954 by English Anglican bishop Trevor Huddleston. In 1968 the United Nations passed a resolution asking members to cut any "cultural, educational, and sporting ties with the racist regime", thereby bringing pressure to bear on musicians and other performers to avoid playing in South Africa. In 1980, the UN passed a resolution allowing a cultural boycott of South Africa. The resolution named Nelson Mandela, and his profile was raised further by the ANC deciding to focus its campaign on him in 1982, 20 years after he had been imprisoned. In 1983, Special AKA released their song "Free Nelson Mandela", an optimistic finale to their debut album, which was generally sombre. The song was produced by Elvis Costello, and had a backing chorus composed of members of the Specials and the Beat, which created a mood of "joyous solidarity". The lyrics to the song were written by Jerry Dammers. Dammers also founded the British branch of the organisation Artists United Against Apartheid. The song was quickly embraced by the movement against apartheid. It was used by the UN and the ANC, and demonstrators would frequently sing it during marches and rallies. The chorus was catchy and straightforward, making it easy to remember. Dammers utilised the association with the anti-apartheid movement to popularise the song, by putting an image of Mandela on the front of the cover for the album, and placing information about the apartheid regime on the back.

In the late 1980s, Paul Simon caused controversy when he chose to record his album Graceland in South Africa, along with a number of Black African musicians. He received sharp criticism for breaking the cultural boycott. In 1987 he claimed to have received clearance from the ANC: however, he was contradicted by Dali Tambo, the son of ANC president Oliver Tambo, and the founder of Artists United Against Apartheid. As a way out of the fracas, Hugh Masekela, who had known Simon for many years, proposed a joint musical tour, which would include songs from Graceland as well as from black South African artists. Miriam Makeba was among the musicians featured on the Graceland Tour. Masekela justified the tour saying that the cultural boycott had led to a "lack of growth" in South African music. However, when the group played in the UK at the Royal Albert Hall, there were protests outside, in which Dammers participated, along with Billy Bragg and Paul Weller. Songs performed on the tour included "Soweto Blues", sung by Makeba, along with many other anti-apartheid songs.

=== Sun City and aftermath ===
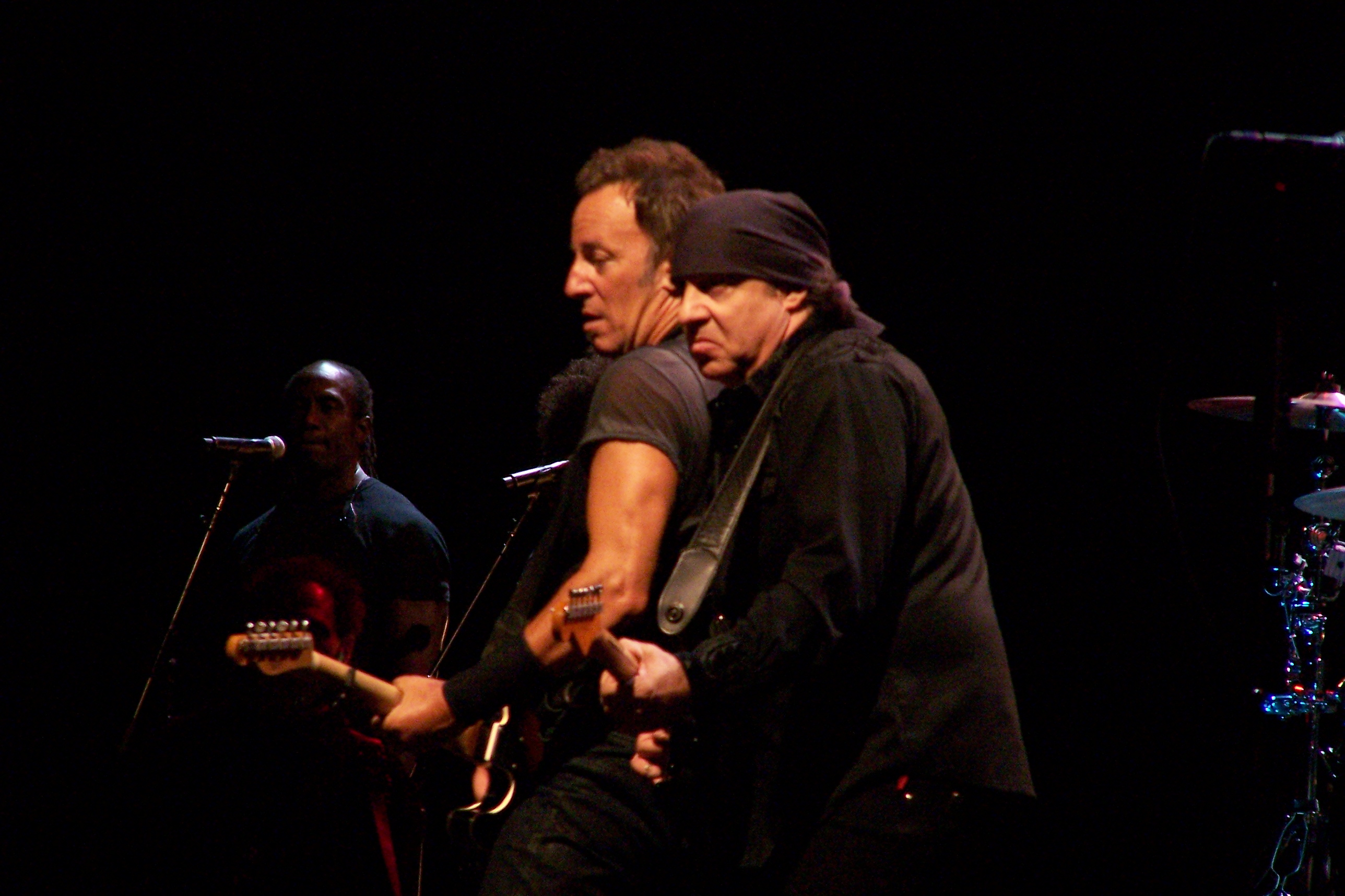
Steven Van Zandt (foreground) who organised the "Sun City" recording of 1985, seen on stage with Bruce Springsteen in 2009

During the same period as the controversy over "Graceland", Steven van Zandt, upset by the fact that artists from Europe and North America were willing to perform in Sun City, a whites-only luxury resort in the "homeland" of Bophutatswana, persuaded artists including Bono, Bruce Springsteen, and Miles Davis, to come together to record the single "Sun City", which was released in 1985. The single achieved its aim of stigmatising the resort. The album was described as the "most political of all of the charity rock albums of the 1980s". "Sun City" was explicitly critical of the foreign policy of U.S. President Ronald Reagan, stating that he had failed to take firm action against apartheid. As a result, only about half of American radio stations played "Sun City." Meanwhile, "Sun City" was a major success in countries where there was little or no radio station resistance to the record or its messages, reaching No. 4 in Australia, No. 10 in Canada and No. 21 in the UK.

A number of prominent anti-apartheid songs were released in the years that followed. Stevie Wonder released "It's Wrong", and was also arrested for protesting against apartheid outside the South African embassy in Washington, D.C. A song popular with younger audiences was "I've Never Met a Nice South African" by Spitting Image, which released the song as a b-side to their successful "The Chicken Song". Eddy Grant, a Guyanese-British reggae musician, released "Gimme Hope Jo'anna" (Jo'Anna being Johannesburg). Other performers released music which referenced Steve Biko. Labi Siffre's "(Something Inside) So Strong", a UK top 5 hit single in 1987, was adopted as an anti-apartheid anthem.

In 1988, Dammers and Jim Kerr, the vocalist of Simple Minds, organised a concert in honour of Mandela's 70th birthday. The concert was held at Wembley Stadium, and ended with the songs "Biko," "Sun City", and "Bring Him Back Home". Dammers and Simple Minds also performed their own anti-apartheid songs: "Free Nelson Mandela" and "Mandela Day", respectively. Other acts performing at the concert included Stevie Wonder, Whitney Houston, Sting, Salt-N-Pepa, Dire Straits and Eurythmics. The event was broadcast to a TV audience of approximately 600 million people. Political aspects of the concert were heavily censored in the United States by the Fox television network, which rebranded it as "Freedomfest". The use of music to raise awareness about apartheid paid off: a survey after the concert found that among people aged between 16 and 24, three-fourths knew of Nelson Mandela, and supported his release from prison. Although the cultural boycott had succeeded in isolating the apartheid government culturally, it also affected musicians who had worked against apartheid within South Africa; thus Johnny Clegg and Savuka were forbidden from playing at the concert.

== Lyrical and musical themes ==
The lyrics of anti-apartheid protest music often used subversive meanings hidden under innocuous lyrics, partially as a consequence of the censorship that they experienced. Purely musical techniques were also used to convey meaning. The tendency to use hidden meaning increased as the government grew less tolerant from the 1950s to the 1980s. Popular protest songs of the 1950s often directly addressed politicians. "Ndodemnyama we Verwoerd" by Mini told Hendrik Verwoerd "Naants'indod'emnyama, Verwoerd bhasobha" (beware of the advancing blacks), while a song referring to pass laws in 1956 included the phrase "Hey Strydom, Wathint'a bafazi, way ithint'imbodoko uzaKufa" (Strydom, now that you have touched the women, you have struck a rock, you have dislodged a boulder, and you will be crushed). Following the Sharpeville massacre songs became less directly critical of the government, and more mournful. "Thina Sizwe" included references to stolen land, was described as depicting emotional desolation, while "Senzeni Na" (what have we done) achieved the same effect by repeating that phrase a number of times. Some musicians adapted innocuous popular tunes and modified their lyrics, thereby avoiding the censors. The Soweto uprising marked a turning point in the movement, as songs written in the 1980s again became more direct, with the appearance of musicians such as Lucey, who "believed in an in‐your‐face, tell‐it‐like‐it‐is approach". Lyrics from this period included calls such as "They are lying to themselves. Arresting us, killing us, won't work. We'll still fight for our land," and "The whites don't negotiate with us, so let's fight".

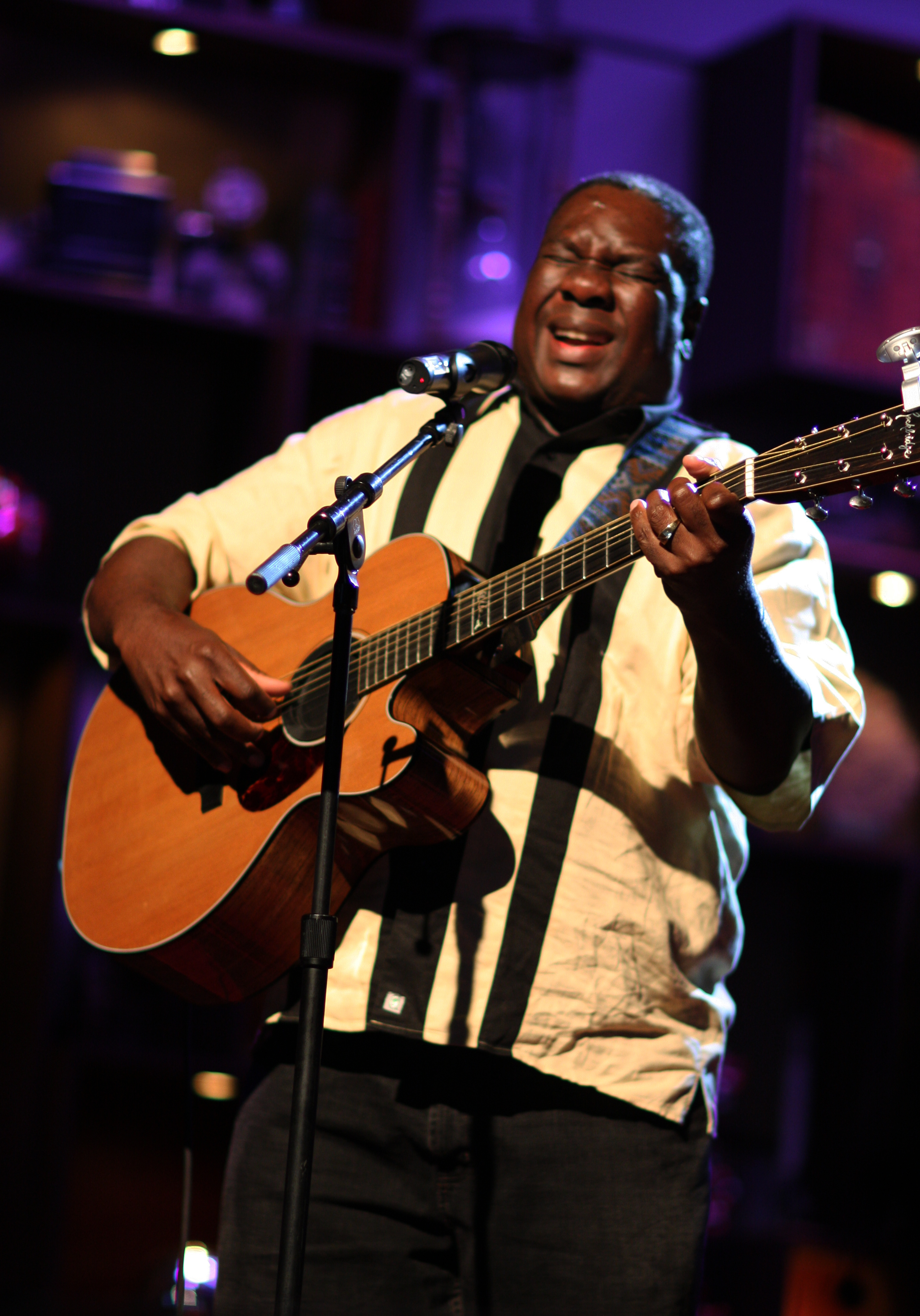
Vusi Mahlasela (pictured at a concert in 2008) was among those who stated that there was no distinction between singing about personal life and political matters.

A number of South African "Freedom Songs" had musical origins in makwaya, or choir music, which combined elements of Christian hymns with traditional South African musical forms. The songs were often short and repetitive, using a "call-and-response" structure. The music was primarily in indigenous languages such as Xhosa or Zulu, as well as in English. Melodies used in these songs were often very straightforward. Songs in the movement portrayed basic symbols that were important in South Africa—re-purposing them to represent their message of resistance to apartheid. This trend had begun decades previously when South African jazz musicians had added African elements to jazz music adapted from the United States in the 1940s and 1950s. Voëlvry musicians used rock and roll music to represent traditional Afrikaans songs and symbols. Groups affiliated with the Black Consciousness movement also began incorporating traditional material into their music: the jazz-fusion group Malombo, for example, used traditional rhythms of the Venda people to communicate pride in African culture, often with music that was not explicitly political. While musicians such as Makeba, performing outside South Africa, felt an obligation to write political lyrics, musicians within the country often held that there was no divide between revolutionary music and, for instance, love songs, because the struggle of living a normal life was also a political one. Vusi Mahlasela would write in 1991: "So who are they who say no more love poems now? I want to sing a song of love for that woman who jumped fences pregnant and still gave birth to a healthy child."

The lyrical and musical tone of protest songs varied with the circumstances they were written and composed in. The lyrics of "Bring Him Back Home", for example, mention Mandela "walking hand in hand with Winnie Mandela," his wife at the time. The melody used in the song is upbeat and anthem-like. The song also employs a series of trumpet riffs by Masekela. Music review website AllMusic describes the melody as "filled with the sense of camaraderie and celebration that are referred to in the lyrics. The vocal choir during the joyous chorus is extremely moving and life affirming". In contrast, the lyrics of "Soweto Blues" refer to the children's protests and the resulting massacre in the Soweto uprising. A review stated that the song had "searingly righteous lyrics" that "cut to the bone." Musically, the song has a background of mbaqanga guitar, bass, and multi-grooved percussion. Makeba uses this as a platform for vocals that are half-sung and half-spoken, similar to blues music.

== Censorship and resistance ==
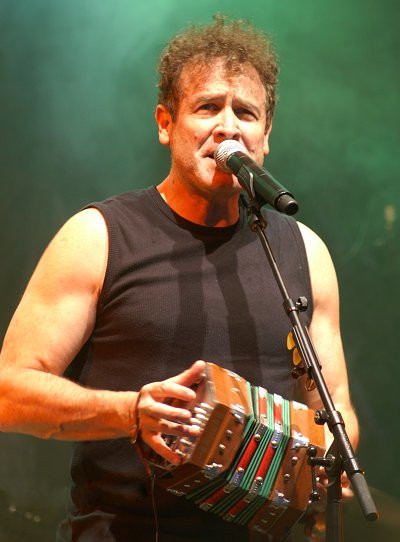
Johnny Clegg was the frontman for Juluka and its successor Savuka: both bands faced persecution for being mixed-race groups

The apartheid government greatly limited freedom of expression, through censorship, reduced economic freedom, and reduced mobility for black people. However, it did not have the resources to effectively enforce censorship of written and recorded material. The government established the Directorate of Publications in 1974 through the Publications Act, but this body only responded to complaints, and took decisions about banning material that was submitted to it. Less than one hundred pieces of music were formally banned by this body in the 1980s. Thus music and performance played an important role in propagating subversive messages.

However, the government used its control of the South African Broadcasting Corporation to prevent "undesirable" songs from being played (which included political or rebellious music, and music with "blasphemous" or overtly sexual lyrics), and to enforce its ideal of a cultural separation between racial groups, in addition to physical separation it had created. Radio and television broadcasts were area-specific such that members of different racial groups received different programs, and music was selected keeping the ideology of the government in mind. Music that used slang or more than one language faced censorship. Artists were required to submit both their lyrics and their music to be scrutinised by the SABC committee, which banned thousands of songs. For instance, Shifty Records, from the time of its establishment in 1982 until the end of the 1980s, had 25 music albums and seven singles banned by the Directorate of Publications because of political content and a further 16 for other reasons such as blasphemy and obscenity.

As a result of the practices of the SABC, record companies began putting pressure on their artists to avoid controversial songs, and often also made changes to songs they were releasing. Individuals were expected to racially segregate their musical choices as well: mixed-race bands were sometimes forced to play with some members behind a curtain, and people who listened to music composed by members of a different race faced government suspicion. Many black musicians faced harassment from the police; Jonas Gwangwa stated that performers were often stopped and required to explain their presence in "white" localities. Black musicians were forbidden from playing at venues when alcohol was sold, and performers were required to have an extra "night pass" to be able to work in the evenings. Further restrictions were placed by the government each time it declared a state of emergency, and internal security legislation was also used to ban material. Music from artists outside the country was also targeted by the censors; all songs by The Beatles were banned in the 1960s, and Stevie Wonder's music was banned in 1985, after he dedicated his Oscar award to Mandela. Two independent radio stations, Capital Radio and Radio 702 came into being in 1979 and 1980, respectively. Since these were based in the "independent" homelands of Transkei and Bophutatswana, respectively, they were nominally not bound by the government's regulations. Although they tended to follow the decisions of the Directorate, they also played music by bands such as Juluka, which were not featured by the SABC. Neither station, however, played "Sun City" when it was released in 1985, as the owners of the Sun City resort had partial ownership of both stations.

A large number of musicians, including Masekela and Makeba, as well as Abdullah Ibrahim were driven into exile by the apartheid government. Songs written by these people were prohibited from being broadcast, as were all songs that opposed the apartheid government. Most of the anti-apartheid songs of the period were censored by the apartheid government. "Bring Him Back Home" was banned in South Africa by the government upon its release. Nonetheless, it became a part of the number of musical voices protesting the apartheid regime, and became an important song for the anti-apartheid movement in the late 1980s. It was declared to be "clean" by the South African government following Mandela's release from prison in 1990.

Artists within South Africa sometimes used subtle lyrics to avoid the censors. The song "Weeping", performed by the band Bright Blue and written by Dan Heymann, a "reluctant army conscript", used "Nkosi Sikelel' iAfrika", an anthem of the ANC that had been banned, as the backdrop for symbolic lyrics about a man living in fear of an oppressive society. The censor failed to notice this, and the song became immensely popular, reaching No 1 on the government's own radio station. Similarly, jazz musicians would often incorporate melodies of freedom songs into their improvisations. Yvonne Chaka Chaka used the phrase "Winning my dear love" in place of "Winnie Mandela", while a compilation album released by Shifty Records was titled "A Naartjie in Our Sosatie", which literally meant "a tangerine in our kebab", but represented the phrase "Anarchy in our Society", a play on words that was not picked up by the censors. Keith Berelowitz would later state that he had submitted fake lyrics, replacing controversial terms with innocuous, similar sounding ones. Some artists, however, avoided explicitly political music altogether: scholar Michael Drewett has written that even when musicians avoided political messages, achieving financial success "despite lack of education, poverty, urban squalor, and other difficulties was certainly a triumph" and that such success was part of the struggle to live normally under apartheid.

Other bands used more direct lyrics, and faced censorship and harassment as a result. Savuka, a multi-racial band, were often arrested or had their concerts raided for playing their song "Asimbonanga", which was dedicated to Biko, Mandela, and others associated with the anti-apartheid movement. A musical tour by Voëlvry musicians faced significant opposition from the government. Major surveillance and threats from police sparked trouble at the beginning of the tour, which created issues over suitable venues, and the musicians were forced to play in abandoned buildings. After Roger Lucey wrote a song critical of the secret police, he received threatening visits by them late at night, and had tear gas poured into an air-conditioning unit during one of his concerts. Lucey's producers were intimidated by the security forces, and his musical recordings confiscated: Lucey himself abandoned his musical career. The song was banned, and an individual could be jailed for five years for owning a copy of it. Musician and public speaker Mzwakhe Mbuli faced more violent reactions: he was shot at, and a grenade was thrown at his house. After the release of his first album "Change is Pain" in 1986, he was arrested and tortured: the album was banned. The concerts of Juluka were sometimes broken up by the police, and musicians were often arrested under the "pass laws" of the apartheid government. When they were stopped, black musicians were often asked to play for the police, to prove that they were in fact musicians.

== Analysis ==
Commentators have stated that as with many social movements, music played a large role in the resistance to apartheid. Writing in the Inquiries Journal, scholar Michela Vershbow writes that although the music of the anti-apartheid movement could not and did not create social change in isolation, it acted as a means of unification, as a way of raising awareness of apartheid, and allowed people from different cultural background to find commonality. Protest songs were often used by the anti-apartheid movement as a means of building unity and inspiring its followers. According to Vershbow, "The communal ownership of liberation songs, and the adoptability of their message within different movements, allows for them to strengthen, mobilise, and unify a community." Music and cultural performances were put to several uses by the South African diaspora, such as the ANC cultural ensembles Mayibuye and Amandla. The groups themselves intended their performances to raise awareness of apartheid outside South Africa (sometimes described as raising consciousness), and to generate support for their activities, as well as to raise funds for the ANC. In addition, they filled the role of "presenting an alternative vision of culture in a future democratic South Africa."

Music scholar Anne Schumann writes that music protesting apartheid became a part of Western popular culture, and the "moral outrage" about apartheid in the west was influenced by this music. The cultural boycott, and the criticism that Paul Simon received for breaking it, was an example of how closely connected music had become to politics with respect to apartheid.

There has been occasional tension between those musicians who went into exile, and were therefore able to perform for, and raise awareness among, much larger audiences, and anti-apartheid musicians who remained in South Africa. The latter group has received significantly less popular attention, though Vershbow states that it played an equally important role in the movement, and Schumann argues that it was responsible for putting significant pressure on the apartheid government. The role of music in social change in South African is examined in the documentary film Amandla!: A Revolution in Four-Part Harmony, released in 2002. The film focuses specifically on the 'liberation music' of the struggle against white domination.

Scholars have suggested that oral traditions in general and poetry in particular were well placed to play a part in cultural resistance to apartheid. Music and poetry were more accessible to a large number of South Africans than written material (partly due to the restrictions placed by apartheid). Music, poetry, and storytelling also formed part of the everyday life of a number of South Africans, and protest songs emerged from these traditions. In addition, poetry was traditionally seen by some South Africans as a legitimate means of criticising authority, with poetic licence allowing artists to say things that would otherwise not be acceptable.

== Prominent examples ==
The following is a partial list of songs, ordered chronologically, that have been described by scholars and commentators as significant examples of music in the movement against apartheid.

- "Nkosi Sikelel' iAfrika", 1897, Enoch Sontonga.
- "iLand Act, year unknown, R. T. Caluza.
- "Ndodemnyama we Verwoerd", year unknown, Vuyisile Mini.
- "Senzeni Na?", year unknown, composer unknown.
- "Thina Sizwe", year unknown, composer unknown.
- "Meadowlands", 1955, Strike Vilakazi.
- "uDr. Malan Unomthetho Onzima", year unknown, Dorothy Masuka.
- "Sophiatown is Gone", year unknown, Miriam Makeba.
- "Bye Bye Sophiatown, year unknown, Sun Valley Sisters.
- "Mannenberg", 1974, Abdullah Ibrahim.
- "Johannesburg", 1975, Gil-Scott Heron.
- "In Soweto", 1975, The Minerals.
- "Soweto Blues", 1977, Hugh Masekela/Miriam Makeba.
- "Fire in Soweto", 1978, Sonny Okosun.
- "Afrikaans", 1979, Resurrection Band.
- "Biko", 1980, Peter Gabriel.
- "Longile Tabalaza", year unknown, Roger Lucey.
- "Free Nelson Mandela", 1984, The Special AKA.
- "It's Wrong (Apartheid)", 1985, Stevie Wonder.
- "Sun City" (aka "I Ain't Gonna Play Sun City"), 1985, Steven Van Zandt/Artists United Against Apartheid.
- "Nelson Mandela", 1986, Youssou N'Dour.
- "(Waiting For) The Ghost Train", 1986, Madness.
- "I've Never Met a Nice South African", 1986, Spitting Image.
- "Bring Him Back Home", 1987, Hugh Masekela.
- "Asimbonanga", 1987, Johnny Clegg/Savuka.
- "(Something Inside) So Strong", 1987, Labi Siffre.
- "Weeping", 1987, Dan Heymann/Bright Blue.
- "Mandela Day", 1988, Simple Minds.
- "The End is Near", 1988, The Malopoets.
- "Gimme Hope Jo'anna, 1988, Eddy Grant.
- "My Black President", 1989, Brenda Fassie.
- "Nelson Mandela", 1994, Sipho Mabuse.

== Sources ==
- Ansell, Gwen (2005). Soweto Blues: Jazz, Popular Music, and Politics in South Africa. A&C Black. ISBN 978-0-8264-1753-4.
- Coplan, David B. (July 2005). "God Rock Africa: Thoughts on Politics in Popular Black Performance in South Africa". African Studies. 64 (1): 9–27. doi:10.1080/00020180500139015. S2CID 145099483.
- Eze, M. (2016). Intellectual History in Contemporary South Africa. Springer. ISBN 978-0-230-10969-8.
- Drewett, Michael (2003). "Music in the Struggle to End Apartheid: South Africa". In Cloonan, Martin; Garofalo, Reebee (eds.). Policing Pop. Philadelphia, Pennsylvania, USA: Temple University Press. pp. 153–165.
- Gilbert, Shirli (27 April 2007). "Singing Against Apartheid: ANC Cultural Groups and the International Anti-Apartheid Struggle" (PDF). Journal of Southern African Studies. 33 (2): 421–441. doi:10.1080/03057070701292848. S2CID 145605467.
- Muller, Carol A. (June 2006). "The New African Diaspora, the Built Environment and the past in Jazz". Ethnomusicology Forum. 15 (1): 63–86. doi:10.1080/17411910600634270. S2CID 194059852.
- Raditlhalo, Sam (2009). "The Self-Invention of Hugh Masekela". JLS/TLW. 25 (1): 34–52.
- Schumann, Anne (2008). "The Beat that Beat Apartheid: The Role of Music in the Resistance against Apartheid in South Africa" (PDF). Wiener Zeitschrift für kritische Afrikastudien. 14 (8): 17–39.
- Drewett, Michael (2016). "Shifty Records in apartheid South Africa: innovations in independent record company resistance". Journal of South African Musicology. 35.
