= Ipi Tombi =

1974 musical by Bertha Egnos and Gail Lakier

Iphi Ntombi
- Music: Bertha Egnos
- Lyrics: Gail Lakier
- Book: Bertha Egnos
- Productions: 1974 Johannesburg; 1976 West End; 1977 Broadway

Ipi Tombi (also produced as Ipi N'tombi, both corrupted transliterations of the Zulu iphi ntombi, or "where is the girl?"), is a 1974 musical by South African writers Bertha Egnos Godfrey and her daughter Gail Lakier, telling the story of a young black man leaving his village and young wife to work in the mines of Johannesburg. The show, originally called The Warrior, uses pastiches of a variety of South African indigenous musical styles.

== Productions ==
The show, which starred Margaret Singana, enjoyed major success in South Africa and Nigeria, and toured Europe, the United States, Canada and Australia to critical acclaim. It played in the West End at Her Majesty's Theatre and on Broadway at the Harkness Theatre. The latter production attracted protests from groups who believed that the show gave a false impression of life in South Africa. That was the last production ever at the Harkness Theatre before it closed and was demolished.

== Appropriation ==
South African musician Strike Vilakazi charged that Egnos had appropriated some of his recorded music in Ipi Tombi's hit song "Mama Thembu's Wedding". Vilakezi's allegation was supported by an investigation by the Southern African Music Rights Organisation (SAMRO). However, he was unable to obtain redress in court. Commentators have referred to this episode as an example of the widespread appropriation of black South African music (both traditional and contemporary, recorded music) by white artists, who then profited from it.

== Awards and nominations ==
=== Original London production ===
Year	Award	Category	Nominee	Result
1976	Laurence Olivier Award	Best New Musical		Nominated
