= Xolani Maholo =

South African soccer player

Personal information
- Date of birth: 21 November 1996 (age 29)
- Place of birth: New Brighton, South Africa
- Position: Midfielder

Youth career
- –2018: Chippa United

Senior career*
Years	Team	Apps	(Gls)
2018–2020	Chippa United	29	(1)
2020–2021	TS Galaxy	1	(0)
- * Club domestic league appearances and goals as of 17:52, 16 December 2021 (UTC)

Xolani Maholo (born 21 November 1996) is a South African soccer player who plays as a midfielder.

== Early life ==
Maholo was born in New Brighton, near Port Elizabeth.

== Career ==
Having previously played for their reserve side, Maholo joined Chippa United's senior team at the start of the 2017–18 season, with him signing his first professional contract in September 2017. He made his debut for Chippa United in a 2–0 victory against AmaZulu on 7 January 2018.

He joined TS Galaxy during the 2020–21 season was released by TS Galaxy in summer 2021, after 1 appearance for the club.
