= Shadow Man (Johnny Clegg & Savuka album) =

Studio album by Johnny Clegg & Savuka
- Released: 1988
- Recorded: 1987–1988
- Genre: World Music
- Length: 42:10
- Label: Capitol
- Producer: Hilton Rosenthal

Johnny Clegg & Savuka chronology
Third World Child (1987)	Shadow Man (1988)	Cruel, Crazy Beautiful World (1989)

Professional ratings
Review scores
Source	Rating
Allmusic	3/5 stars
The Village Voice	C

Shadow Man is the second studio album from South African artist Johnny Clegg and his band Savuka.

It was released in 1988 and produced by Hilton Rosenthal. South Africa's apartheid was still in place, and some of the songs contained heavy political messages aimed at the regime. The lyrics were mainly sung in English, with backing vocals in Zulu. All were written by Johnny Clegg with the exception of tracks 7 and 8, for which Keith Hutchinson collaborated. The album twice reached #31 in Canada - first on September 3, 1988, and again on October 1. The single "I Call Your Name" reached #78 in Canada, August 27, 1988.

== Track listing ==
1. "Human Rainbow" – 4:24
2. "Talk to the People" – 3:58
3. "Too Early for the Sky" – 4:23
4. "I Call Your Name" – 4:01
5. "Take My Heart Away" – 4:15
6. "The Waiting" – 4:59
7. "African Shadow Man" – 4:28
8. "Dance Across the Centuries" – 3:53
9. "Joey Don't Do It" – 3:29
10. "Siyayilanda" – 4:14

== Personnel ==
- Johnny Clegg – vocals, guitar, concertina, mouth bow
- Solly Letwaba – bass guitar, vocals
- Derek de Beer – drums, percussion, vocals
- Keith Hutchinson – keyboards, flute, saxophone, vocals
- Steve Mavuso – keyboards, vocals
- Dudu Zulu – percussion, vocals

Additional personnel

- Bobby Summerfield– mixer, recording engineer, keyboards & drum programing.

== Additional musicians ==
- Mandisa Dlanga – backing vocals
- Deborah Fraser – backing vocals
- Marilyn Nokwe – backing vocals
- Beaulah Hashe – backing vocals
