= New Brighton, Eastern Cape =

New Brighton
- Location within Eastern Cape Location within South Africa
- Coordinates: 33.899°S 25.595°E
- Country: South Africa
- Province: Eastern Cape
- Municipality: Nelson Mandela Bay
- Main Place: Ibhayi

Government
  - Type: Metro Council

Area
  - Total: 4.85 km^{2} (1.87 sq mi)

Population (2011)
  - Total: 47,917
  - Density: 9,880/km^{2} (25,600/sq mi)

Racial makeup (2011)
  - Black African: 99.6%
  - Coloured: 0.2%
  - Other: 0.2%

First languages (2011)
  - Xhosa: 92.5%
  - English: 3.0%
  - Other: 4.5%
- Time zone: UTC+2 (SAST)
- PO box: 7070

New Brighton is a township in the Eastern Cape, South Africa. It forms part of the greater township of Ibhayi and the Nelson Mandela Bay Metropolitan Municipality which governs Port Elizabeth and its surroundings.

== History ==
The town was established in 1902, and was the first officially black residential area in the greater Port Elizabeth area. Prior to the establishment of New Brighton as the first black township, there was a demolishing of the then Black residential area in 1902 where the personal belongings of the Black residents were arbitrarily destroyed, and restrictions imposed upon their travel outside the demarcated area. The racially segregated township of New Brighton was established in 1902 on the outskirts of Port Elizabeth, some 8 km north of the city centre, to house families who had been forcefully removed in the previous years. Many of Athol Fugard's plays are set in New Brighton.

As part of the governing modus-operandi of the Colonial Government of the 19th century, that would eventually lead to the Land Act of 1913 a decade later, where policy was formulated on the basis of ethnicity, townships, including that of New Brighton, were established for the exclusive use of Black residents who were not housed by employers, and who could not afford to purchase property in the suburbs. In 1855, Stranger's Location, known as Emaxambeni in isiXhosa was established. Stranger's Location spilled over into Cooper's Kloof in the 1860s and became a separate municipal location in 1877. The Reservoir Location off Mount Road was established by the Municipality in 1883. The largest privately owned township, Gubb's Location, was established in the 1860s.

A case of bubonic plague in Gubb's Location in 1901 set in place events that led to demolition of these townships and the creation of New Brighton. Port Elizabeth recorded a total of 105 cases - 21 Whites and 84 Blacks - of bubonic plague in 1901. This was the direct result of Argentinian fodder and horses being imported into South Africa by the British military during the South African War.

After the first case was reported, the residents from the various townships agreed to meet. During the meeting it was agreed that a single township outside Port Elizabeth had to be built. Following recommendations from public health officials, demolished houses numbered 325 in Port Elizabeth and 950 in the Stranger's location, The Reservoir Location and Gubb's Location townships in 1903. The establishment of New Brighton was facilitated by the Colonial Government's purchase of the farms known as Cradock Place and Deal Party for the sum of £20,000. The portion set for the establishment of New Brighton was situated north of Port Elizabeth in an area which was deemed unsuitable for industrial use. The choice of a site for New Brighton outside the town's boundaries was determined by favourable health conditions in the area, and the fact that it would allow for effective residential segregation. These were on the outskirts of Port Elizabeth, far away from the city centre and white suburbs where New Brighton residents were employed. In its very early days, Port Elizabeth was planned in a manner that did not allow for different races to mix and this was spelt out as such in colonial policy and regulations. White and Coloured people, even though New Brighton was established as an exclusively Black township, flouted Government rules and built homes in New Brighton, albeit only a few. By the year 1911, New Brighton’s population had grown to 3,650 persons, almost all of them Black: 52 Whites, 3,414 Black Africans and 184 Coloureds. The oldest and most iconic location within the New Brighton area is the Red Location, which was developed in 1902-1903, and made up of corrugated iron shacks which were built in a barrack-type fashion.

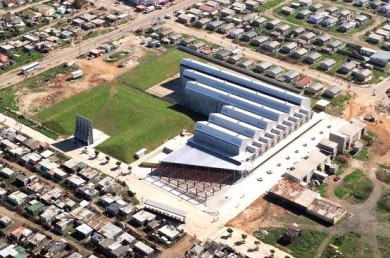
An aerial view of Red Location Museum in New Brighton township near Port Elizabeth, Eastern Cape, South Africa

Accommodation for individuals in New Brighton was allotted on a first-come, first-served basis. The Government initially planned to rehouse only about 1,500 people in the Location even though estimates suggested that about three times that number of Africans resided in Port Elizabeth and slum areas, and that a similar number lived outside the municipal boundaries. Huts were erected in this order: one and two-bedroomed family accommodation for 'ordinary native labourers' and 'civilised natives' also known as Class A and B, and dormitories for 'single men' called Class C. Rents in New Brighton of between 20s. and 30s. per month for family quarters and 8s. per month for single quarters (Class C). At the end of 1903 the population of New Brighton was 2,125. Some residents from the demolished townships of Stranger's location, The Reservoir Location and Gubb's Location refused to move to New Brighton and opted for Korsten. In Korsten, they could own land. By January 1910, the population of New Brighton had reached 3,156.

== New Brighton today ==
Today, New Brighton is made up of many more locations, namely White location, Elundini, KwaFord, Boast Village, Masangwanaville and Chris Hani informal settlement, amongst others. New Brighton is also popular for the sons and daughters it birthed, who would go on to be prominent anti-apartheid activists and leaders of post-apartheid, democratic South Africa. Amongst the prominent South African people born and bred in New Brighton include actor and playwright Ken Gampu, John Kani, Nomhle Nkonyeni, ANC stalwart Vusi Pikoli and Black Consciousness co-founder Barney Pityana. As such, the first cell of Umkhonto we Sizwe, the armed wing of the ANC, was set up in New Brighton. Some of the prominent names in the South African art scene today – a new generation following those mentioned above – that were also born and bred in New Brighton include poet Mxolisi Nyezwa and dramatist-playwright Mzwandile Zwai Mgijima. Many of the historic places that served as cultural and political hubs in New Brighton and Port Elizabeth at large in the 1960s have either been demolished or changed to suit contemporary needs. Notable amongst these include the former Rio Bioscope, opened in 1950 on Aggrey Road, that is today being used as a church by the Cathedral Church of Umzi Wasi Topiya, naming it Kaizer Ngxwana after the anti-apartheid struggle stalwart. The Red Location Museum is one of the main tourist attractions.

== Geography ==
New Brighton forms part of the greater township of Ibhayi. It is surrounded by the township of KwaZakhele in the north, Algoa Park, and Cradock Place in the east, Young Park in the south-east, Sidwell in the south and the industrial area of Deal Party in the west.

It is located along the R75 (Uitenhage Road) to Uitenhage and North End and north of the N2 off-ramp. The N2 links to Humansdorp, George and Cape Town in the west and Makhanda, East London and Durban in the east.

== Commerce and industry ==
The Struandale industrial area is a popular industrial node in Nelson Mandela Bay located west of New Brighton and is often considered part of New Brighton.

Notable companies in Struandale include Distell Distribution, DSV Pharmacare, BASF, MW Wheels, Eveready, and most importantly the Isuzu automotive manufacturing plant and Ford engine manufacturing plant.

Continental Tyres and PPC Cement have their manufacturing plants in New Brighton.

== Education ==
Port Elizabeth College which is a higher education facility has its campus in the Struandale area, west of New Brighton.

Basic education facilities/schools in New Brighton include:

- Ben Sinuka Primary School
- Charles Duna Primary School
- Cowan High School
- David Vuku Primary School
- Ithembelihle Technical High School
- Kama Primary School
- Molefe Senior Primary School
- Newell Public High School
- Pendla Primary School
- Phillip Nikiwe Primary School
- Samuel Nongogo Primary School
- Zincedeni Technical High School

== Culture ==
The song "Berlin Wall" on Johnny Clegg & Savuka's first album Third World Child refers to the local nickname given to the fence erected by security forces around the township during the 1986 State of emergency.

== Notable people ==
- John Kani - actor
- Atandwa Kani - actor
- Monde Lobese - Chief of Navy SA
- Zolani Mahola - musician
- Jumartha Majola - community worker and social activist
- Nomhle Nkonyeni - actor
- Winston Ntshona - actor
- George Pemba - painter and writer
- Vusi Pikoli - lawyer
- Mzwandile Stick - SA Rugby Coach
- Solly Tyibilika - Former SA Rugby Player
