= Meadowlands Secondary School =

Information
- Type: Government
- Established: 1955
- Session: single
- Principal: Mr Mashaba

Meadowlands Secondary School (also referred to as Meadowlands High or Ndofaya High) is a government secondary school in Meadowlands, a section of Soweto.

== History ==
Meadowlands was one of the first schools established in Meadowlands after forceful removals from Sophiatown.

On 20 January 1976, the Meadowlands School Board was instructed by the circuit inspector that subjects like history, geography and mathematics would be taught through the medium of Afrikaans. The board unanimously resolved that the medium of instruction in schools under jurisdiction of the Meadowlands School Board from standard 3 to 8 (grade 5 to 10) should be in English. Early in February of the same year, two members of the school board, Mr. Letlape and Mr. Peele were dismissed by the Apartheid education authorities. On 16 June news reached the school of the shootings that were taking place in Soweto. Students here destroyed some landmarks and the next day they organised a march to Orlando Stadium.

In 2011 the School's governing body was in open disagreement with the Education authority when a teacher and the head, Moss Senye, were suspended over an alleged assault on a student. Senye had been suspended for over six months and the governing body locked the school gates in protest. Despite this controversy the school increased its matric class pass rate from 58% to 78% by January 2013.

== 16 June Soweto Heritage Trail ==
Meadowlands Secondary school received a heritage plaque on 16 June 2013, as part of the 16 June Soweto Heritage Trail facilitated by the city of Johannesburg. The plaque was unveiled by Johannesburg mayor Clr. Parks Mpo Tau.
