= Strike Vilakazi =

South African musician

Strike David Vilakazi (also written Vilakezi) was a South African vocalist, drummer, trumpeter, composer, and music producer. He was known for composing the anti-apartheid song "Meadowlands", and for his career as a producer, during which he was influential in the development of mbaqanga.

== "Meadowlands" ==
The settlement of Sophiatown had been destroyed by the apartheid government of South Africa in 1955, and its 60,000 inhabitants forcibly moved, many of them to a settlement known as Meadowlands. The forced relocation inspired Vilakezi to write "Meadowlands". "Meadowlands" was set to an "infectious jive beat". It featured music writer Todd Matshikiza on the piano. The lyrics of the song were written in three languages; IsiZulu, SeSotho, and tsotsitaal, or street slang. Superficially upbeat, the song was misinterpreted as being supportive of the move by the South African government; as a result, Vilakezi was congratulated for it by a government bureaucrat, and according to some sources, had an application for housing expedited. Originally performed by Nancy Jacobs and Her Sisters, as with many other protest songs of this period, "Meadowlands" was made popular both within and outside South Africa by Miriam Makeba, and it became an anthem of the movement against apartheid.

== Production career ==
When he wrote "Meadowlands", Vilakezi was a "talent scout" for the music production company "Troubadour". From 1952 to 1970 he also ran the black division of the music production company True Tone Records. He was among the first musicians to affiliate with the organisation South African Society of Composers, Authors, and Music Publishers, which sought to represent musicians in some legal matters. In 1962, its functions were largely taken over by the Southern African Music Rights Organisation (SAMRO). In 1954, he recorded Spokes Mashiyane playing the pennywhistle, and would later persuade Mashiyane that the same music would sound better on a saxophone. The music that resulted has been described as the earliest style of mbaqanga, a genre that would remain popular among black South Africans for many years.

== Appropriation ==
In 1974 Bertha Egnos produced the musical Ipi Tombi. Vilakezi charged that she had appropriated some of his recorded music in the musical's hit song "Mama Thembu's Wedding". Vilakezi's allegation was supported by an investigation by SAMRO. However, he was unable to obtain redress in court. Commentators have referred to this episode as an example of the widespread appropriation of black South African music (both traditional and contemporary, recorded music) by white artists, who then profited from it.
