= Cruel, Crazy, Beautiful World =

Studio album by Johnny Clegg & Savuka
- Released: 20 December 1989
- Recorded: 1989
- Genre: World music
- Length: 49:40
- Label: Capitol
- Producer: Hilton Rosenthal and Bobby Summerfield

Johnny Clegg & Savuka chronology
Shadow Man (1988)	Cruel, Crazy, Beautiful World (1989)	Heat, Dust And Dreams (1993)

Cruel, Crazy, Beautiful World is the third studio album from South African artist Johnny Clegg and his band Savuka.

Released in 1989 and produced by Hilton Rosenthal and Bobby Summerfield, it is today recognized as probably the band's greatest album, containing hits such as "Dela" and "Cruel, Crazy, Beautiful World". The title track is addressed and dedicated to Clegg's son Jesse, born in 1988, who is depicted on Clegg's shoulders on the album cover. The song "One (Hu)' Man One Vote" was written in honor of David Webster, a friend of Johnny Clegg and anti-apartheid activist who had been assassinated three weeks earlier. The lyrics of "Warsaw 1943" were inspired from the works of Polish author Czesław Miłosz. In Canada, the album reached #67, March 24, 1990.

The title track appears in the soundtrack of the movies Opportunity Knocks and Career Opportunities.

In 1997, the song "Dela (I Know Why the Dog Howls at the Moon)" was released on the soundtrack of Disney's George of the Jungle.

== Track listing ==
All songs written by Johnny Clegg except as noted.

1. "One (Hu)' Man One Vote" (Johnny Clegg, Bobby Summerfield)
2. "Cruel, Crazy, Beautiful World"
3. "Jericho"
4. "Dela (I Know Why the Dog Howls at the Moon)"
5. "Moliva"
6. "It's an Illusion"
7. "Bombs Away"
8. "Woman Be My Country"
9. "Rolling Ocean" (Clegg, Steve Mavuso)
10. "Warsaw 1943 (I Never Betrayed The Revolution)"
11. "Vezandlebe" (hidden track)

== Personnel ==
- Johnny Clegg - lead vocals and backing vocals, guitars, concertina and mouth bow
- Mandisa Dlanga - backing vocals
- Solly Letwaba – bass and backing vocals
- Derek de Beer – drums, percussions and backing vocals
- Keith Hutchinson – synthesizers, sequencer, flute, saxophone and backing vocals
- Steve Mavuso – synthesizers and backing vocals
- Dudu Zulu – percussions and backing vocals

=== Additional personnel ===
- Alex Acuña - percussions
- Tom Regis - synthesizers
- Benn Clatworthy - tenor saxophone
- Howard Shear - trumpet
- Roy Wigan - trumpet
- John Baxter - backing vocals
- Bobby Summerfield - mixer, recording engineer, synthesizers and drum machine
- Hilton Rosenthal - synthesizers and backing vocals
