= Dela (song) =

Song by Savuka

from the album Cruel, Crazy, Beautiful World
- Language: Zulu, English.
- Released: 1989
- Length: 4:15
- Label: Capitol
- Songwriter: Johnny Clegg

"Dela" is the fourth song from the 1989 album Cruel, Crazy, Beautiful World by South African band Savuka. It is a "straightforward love song", featuring Johnny Clegg singing of waiting for his love, and of being content in her presence. An uptempo song with lyrics in both English and Zulu, it was played commonly at wedding receptions. Discussing the song in an interview with National Public Radio, Clegg stated: "It's about wholeness. Dela in Zulu means - to dela means to be complete and satisfied." Clegg often ended concerts with Dela. It was used in the 1997 movie George of the Jungle, and has been described as Clegg's best-known song among western audiences.
