= Recently (album) =

Studio album by Joan Baez
- Released: July 1987
- Recorded: Capitol (Hollywood)
- Genre: Folk
- Length: 38:38
- Label: Gold Castle
- Producer: Alan Abrahams

Joan Baez chronology
Joan Baez: Classics (1986)	Recently (1987)	Diamonds & Rust in the Bullring (1988)

Recently is a studio album by the American musician Joan Baez, released in 1987. It was her first album of new material issued in the US in eight years.

Baez covered Mark Knopfler, U2, Peter Gabriel, and Johnny Clegg. Baez wrote two of the album's songs.

The track "Asimbonanga" was nominated for a Grammy Award for Best Contemporary Folk Recording.

== Critical reception ==
Professional ratings
Review scores
Source	Rating
AllMusic	4.5/5 stars

Newsday wrote that Baez's "airy soprano is a bit more brittle and edgy these days, but still buoyant." The St. Petersburg Times determined that "Baez's singing, D strong as ever after spending the last six years in voice training, still soars and flutters, but it's more earthy, more soulful."

== Track listing ==
No.	Title	Writer(s)	Length
1.	"Brothers in Arms"	Mark Knopfler	5:01
2.	"Recently"	Joan Baez	3:03
3.	"Asimbonanga"	Johnny Clegg	4:47
4.	"The Moon Is a Harsh Mistress"	Jimmy Webb	3:06
5.	"James & the Gang"	Joan Baez	4:27
6.	"Let Us Break Bread Together"/"Oh Freedom"	Traditional	6:47
7.	"MLK"	Paul David Hewson, David Howell Evans, Larry Mullen, Jr., Adam Clayton	2:54
8.	"Do Right Woman, Do Right Man"	Chips Moman, Dan Penn	3:20
9.	"Biko"	Peter Gabriel	5:13
Total length:			38:38
