= Meadowlands (song) =

"Meadowlands" is an anti-apartheid song composed in 1956 by Strike Vilakazi. It was written in reaction to the forced relocation of black South Africans from Sophiatown, to the new township of Meadowlands. The song was popularised by a number of musicians, including Dorothy Masuka and Miriam Makeba, and became an anthem of the movement against apartheid.

== Background ==
The Afrikaner National Party (NP) was elected to power in South Africa in 1948, and remained in control of the government for the next 46 years. The white minority held all political power during this time, and implemented the system of apartheid. "Apartheid" involved a brutal system of racial segregation, and the word itself meant "separateness" in Afrikaans. Black South Africans were forced to live in poverty stricken townships, and were denied basic human rights, based on the idea that South Africa belonged to white people. The NP government passed the Group Areas Act in 1950 and the Bantu Resettlement Act in 1954. These laws forcibly relocated millions of South Africans into townships in racially segregated areas. This relocation was part of a plan to separate the black population of South Africa into tiny, impoverished bantustans. The settlement of Sophiatown was destroyed during the implementation of this plan in 1955, and its 60,000 inhabitants forcibly moved. Many of them were sent to a settlement known as Meadowlands. Sophiatown had been a cultural centre, particularly for African jazz music, prior to the relocation.

== Composition and performance ==
The forced move away from the Sophiatown township inspired Strike Vilakezi to compose "Meadowlands". Originally sung by Nancy Jacobs and Her Sisters, "Meadowlands" was set to an "infectious jive beat". It featured music writer Todd Matshikiza on the piano. As with many other protest songs of this period, "Meadowlands" was made popular both within and outside South Africa by Miriam Makeba, and it became an anthem of the movement against apartheid. Several other songs, including Makeba's "Sophiatown is Gone", and "Bye Bye Sophiatown" by the Sun Valley Sisters, also referred to the relocation from Sophiatown. "Meadowlands" has subsequently been quoted in compositions by South African musicians, especially in Cape Town, and was covered by several artists, including the Tulips, and Dolly Rathebe. The song was performed outside South Africa by several artists during the apartheid era, helping "expose the injustices suffered by oppressed racial groups", according to commentator Michaela Vershbow. In 2007, it was included in the collection "Essential South African Jazz".

== Lyrics and interpretation ==
The lyrics of the song were written in three languages; IsiZulu, SeSotho, and tsotsitaal, or street slang. "Meadowlands" was superficially sunny and upbeat, including the line "We're moving night and day to go to Meadowlands / We love Meadowlands." This led the South African government to mistakenly believe that the song supported the relocation program. This interpretation was the result of the government relying on a literal translation of the lyrics. The government was so pleased with the song that Vilakezi was praised by a bureaucrat for the song, and reportedly, had a housing application approved. However, the lyrics were intended to be ironic. The residents of Sophiatown understood this interpretation, and sang the song as their possessions were removed from the township by government trucks. Thus the song has been referred to as a notable example of using ambiguous meaning to convey anti-government sentiment in a covert manner. Vershbow describes the lyrics of the song, such as "We will move all night and day / To go stay in Meadowlands / You'll hear the white people saying / Let's go to Meadowlands", as expressing the emotional devastation of the forced move. Scholar Gwen Ansell stated that it was "as rich in nuance as a traditional fable".

== Sources ==
- Ansell, Gwen (2005). Soweto Blues: Jazz, Popular Music, and Politics in South Africa. A&C Black. ISBN 978-0-8264-1753-4.
- Schumann, Anne (2008). "The Beat that Beat Apartheid: The Role of Music in the Resistance against Apartheid in South Africa" (PDF). Wiener Zeitschrift für kritische Afrikastudien. 14 (8): 17–39.
