= Nomhle Nkonyeni =

South African actress (1942–2019)

- Born: 9 April 1942; New Brighton, South Africa
- Died: 10 July 2019 (aged 77); Port Elizabeth, South Africa
- Occupation: Actor
- Years active: 1961–2019
- Children: Thabang Nkonyeni (daughter); Teboho Nkonyeni (son)

Nomhle Nkonyeni (9 April 1942 – 10 July 2019) was a South African actress who has appeared in television series such as Mzansi, Tsha Tsha and the 2007 mini-series Society, as well as feature films such as Of Good Report (2013).

== Career ==
Starting in the 1961 during apartheid, Nkonyeni and others who wanted to change their lives using the stage met with Athol Fugard and formed the Serpent Players. In 1981, she played the lead role in Die Swerfjare van Poppie Nongena (The Long Journey of Poppie Nongena), at the CAPAB (Cape Performing Arts Board) theatre in Cape Town. She said, "I was the first black person to perform on that stage and when that door opened, I never shut it."

Nkonyeni received a Diploma in Conflict Management from Lewisham College in London, England, in 1999.

In 2002, she also received her master's degree in theatre for development from King Alfred's College (now University of Winchester).

Nkonyeni was in the international films Red Dust (2004) with Hilary Swank, Catch A Fire (2006) with Tim Robbins, and as Forest Whitaker's mother in Zulu (aka City of Violence, 2013). Her last film, Knuckle City (2019), is South Africa's official submission for the Academy Awards.

She was also in many soap operas and dramas on television. In 2017, she joined Scandal! in the role of Lulama Langa, mother to Siseko Langa, played by Hlomla Dandala. She was scheduled to film more of "her much-loved and feisty character" when she suddenly died.

== Filmography ==
=== Film ===
| Year | Title | Role | Notes |
|---|---|---|---|
| 2019 | Knuckle City | Ma Bokwana | Crime |
| 2019 | The Space: Theatre of Survival | herself | Documentary |
| 2018 | Sew the Winter to My Skin | Old Matriarch | Action / Adventure |
| 2013 | Of Good Report | Landlady | Crime / Drama / Thriller |
| 2013 | Zulu | Josephina | as Nomhle Nkoyeni |
| 2012 | Angus Buchan's Ordinary People | Maria | as Nomhlé Nkyonyeni |
| 2010 | Themba | Ma Zanele | as Nomhlé Nkyonyeni |
| 2008 | Skin | Jenny Zwane | Biography / Drama |
| 2006 | Catch a Fire | Mama Dorothy | Biography / Drama / History |
| 2004 | Red Dust | Mrs. Sizela | as Nomhle Nkyonyeni |
| 2004 | Gums & Noses | Mrs. Kleynhans | Comedy |
| 2003 | The Wooden Camera | Servant | Family drama |
| 2000 | Christmas with Granny | Granny | Short |
| 1999 | Chikin Biznis ... The Whole Story! | Mamkete | Directed by Ntshaveni Wa Luruli |

=== Television ===
| Year | Title | Role | Notes |
|---|---|---|---|
| 2017 | Scandal! | Lulama Langa | |
| 2007 | Society | Ma Moloi | |
| 2016 | Igazi | Queen Mother | |
| 2006 | Tsha tsha | Lwazi's Aunt | as Nomhlé Nkyonyeni |
| 2005 | Mzansi | Granny | (2005) |
| 2005 | Gaz'lam | Kim's Mom | Season 4 |
| 2004 | Zero Tolerance | | |
| 2003 | Scout's Safari | | 2 episodes as Nomhlé Nkyonyeni |
| 1997 | Les enfants du Karoo | | Television film as Nomhlé Nkyonyeni |

== Awards ==
In 2016 she was awarded the South African Film and Television Awards (SAFTAs) Lifetime Achievement Award. And in 2018, she also received the Lifetime Achievement Award in the Eastern Cape cultural awards.

She received the Order of Ikhamanga in Silver in 2019 for her contribution in arts and culture.

New Brighton, Eastern Cape renamed Aggrey Road after her. The Arthur Wellington Church was on that road, and she spent much of her childhood there.

== Personal life and death ==
Nkonyeni had a son, Teboho Nkonyeni, and a daughter Thabang Nkonyeni, who was murdered on August 11, 2009.

Nkonyeni died in hospital on 10 July 2019 after a short illness aged 77. President Cyril Ramaphosa declared a Special Provincial Funeral Category Two for her because of her outstanding work in the arts and culture in South Africa. Eastern Cape Premier Oscar Mabuyane said, “She has played quite a huge significant role in social cohesion. We really appreciate it and are hugely indebted to people of her calibre and the role that she has played under very difficult conditions, sometimes using art to communicate a message and also to fight the injustice of the then government of the day."

Following her death, a Google Doodle of her life and work was published.
