= Relebogile Mabotja =

South African actress

- Born: 5 September 1985 (age 40); Pretoria, Gauteng, South Africa
- Education: University of South Africa
- Occupations: Radio Host, Television Presenter, Executive Producer, Emcee & Speaker, Voice Over Artist, Actress, Musical Director, News Reader, Non-Executive Director / Chairperson
- Years active: 2004–present
- Known for: Role as Regina in drama series Zone 14
- Website: www.relebogile.co.za

Relebogile Mabotja (born 5 September 1985) is an actress, presenter, radio host, singer, producer, writer, musical director and is currently based in Johannesburg, South Africa.

== Early life ==
Relebogile Mabotja also known as Lebo was born on 5 September 1985 in Pretoria, Gauteng, South Africa. She grew up in Pretoria, South Africa where she found her prowess as an entertainer at the age of 5. While in school, she was recognized for her singing and acting. In her final year of high school, at Pretoria High School for Girls, 2003, she was afforded the opportunity to play the role of 'Mabel' in the Stage production called Fame the Musical.

== Career ==
=== Film and television ===
In the early 2000s Relebogile got the opportunity to perform at the opening of the 46664 concert at the Cape Town International Convention Centre. She also performed at the dinner banquet alongside fellow musicians Marah Louw, Shelley Meskin and Jo Redburn. Towards the end of 2004 she was afforded the opportunity to present a show on e.tv called BackChaton CrazE. She was also cast of the following TV shows: Home Affairs, Zone 14, Generations (South African TV series), Skeem Saam, Rhythm City, Isidingo, an Afrikaans sketch comedy Kompleks as well as a German Film called Traum Hotel.

Towards the end of 2004 Relebogile presented a show on e.tv called Back Chat on CrazE. She also got a presenter role on the e.tv show Gospel Grooves, which aired on Sunday mornings. She also narrated SABC 2's Christmas special called "The 12 Days of Christmas" in 2006.

Between 2010 and 2011 she hosted Season 1 and 2 of the reality competition show which aired on SABC 1 called Dance Your Butt Off. This show is the South African version of the American Show Dance Your Ass Off. Since March 2017, she has been a recurring guest host for SABC 3's daily night show Trending SA. In August 2019, Relebogile was named ambassador for Discovery "Real Time", channel 155 on DSTV.

In 2023 Relebogile Mabotja put on the cap of voice director in a 10-part collection of original animated short films Kizazi Moto: Generation Fire by Disney+ which premiered on 5 July 2023.

Relebogile hosts her own daily talk show, Unpacked with Relebogile Mabotja on SABC 3 with an uncut version available on her YouTube channel. The show is aimed at dissecting real life stories in an interesting yet unfiltered manner.

=== Radio ===
In 2012, Relebogile secured a role as a freelance radio presenter and in 2013 she went onto host Overnight Live and the Early Breakfast Show on Talk Radio 702 and 567 Cape Talk.

In 2019, she was also appointed as news reader and co-host of Metro FM's afternoon drive show "The Kings Suite" after having served as co-host and anchor for the Breakfast Show.

Relebogile is back on Radio 702 with Afternoons with Relebogile Mabotja which speaks to contemporary life and lifestyle topics.

=== Theatre ===
In 2003, Relebogile played the role of Mabel Washington in the Stage production called Fame the Musical. In late 2004, Relebogile was afforded the opportunity to perform in an Afrikaans musical called Imbuba/Samesyn. She performed the same musical in the following festivals Klein Karoo Nasionale Kunstefees and Innibos in Oudtshoorn and Nelspruit (Mbombela) respectively.

In the late 2000s, Relebogile played the role of "Pinky the Shebeen Queen" in the Soweto Story musical which was held at the Joburg Theatre in Gauteng.

=== Music, Producer, Director, Composer ===
In 2013, Relebogile worked on her first musical composition, she wrote the new channel music for SABC 2's rebrand, You Belong, together with producer and artist RJ Benjamin. She also worked on the title music for the following: the Afro Café song, Nedbank's Ke Yona "Making the Team", SABC 1's Making Moves, Sunday Chillas, Mzansi Insider, Koze Kuse, The Remix SA, The Sing Off South Africa and Business Battle. SA, The Sing Off South Africa and Business Battle. In 2014, Relebogile was named series producer and musical director for Season 10 of Afro Café. She also composed the theme song, directed the music and live studio band for ETV's show "I love South Africa".

- Afro café: producer, director, musical director, theme music, publisher
- Making Moves, Mzansi Insider, Koze Kuse, Sunday Chillas, I love South Africa: theme music, composer, publisher
- The Remix SA: musical director, theme music, composer
- The Sing Off SA: musical director
- Business Battle: series producer
- Clash of the Choirs: music expert
- Idols: music consultant

=== Voice Overs ===
She also does voice overs; she is the voice behind the theme songs for Africa Magic, Africa Magic Plus for DStv and the new LOTTO theme song "One day is one day". In 2019 Relebogile was appointed as musical director of Nigeria's "The Winner" and this show will air on Africa Magic.

=== Other projects ===
In 2013 she formed Lebotja Media which is a full service media house as well as a record label. She is an executive producer in the company and works with Leslie "Lee" Kasumba, Jonathan Clarke, Lebogang Morolo, Pilani Bubu as well as Paul McIver. Relebogile also writes columns and articles for Soul Magazine and Teenzone Magazine. She has also emcee'd events such as FIFA Fan Parks during the World Cup 2010, the National Teacher's Awards in 2018 and the opening and closing ceremonies of the World Choir Games.

In 2016, Relebogile was appointed as a non-executive director on the SAMRO (Southern African Music Rights Organisation) board where she later served as an acting chairperson in 2019. She is also an adjudicator and director on the Board of the National Eistedfodd Academy (NEA). She was also a preliminary judge for Mnet's Idols and a music expert for Mzansi Magic's Clash of the Choirs Season 2 and both of these shows are reality talent contests.

=== Emcee, Facilitator and Speaker ===
- World Choir Games

=== Content Creator ===
- YouTube: Relebogile Mabotja
- Twitter: @RelebogileM
- Facebook: Relebogile Mabotja
- Instagram: @Relebogile
- LinkedIn: Relebogile Mabotja
- Threads: @Relebogile

== Allegations of unlawful enrichment at SAMRO ==
In 2019 the Southern African Music Rights Organisation (SAMRO) sued Mabotja for unlawful enrichment. According to the lawsuit, Mabotja and a number of other members of the leadership of SAMRO overpaid themselves by more than R1.6 Million rand. Mabotja herself was allegedly irregularly overpaid by R133 000.

SAMRO would later become the centre of a scandal regarding the underpayment of royalties to artists, much of this taking place during Mabotja's time working for the organisation.

== Awards and nominations ==
Year	Award	Category	Nominated work	Result
2004	Naledi Theatre Awards	Best Newcomer Female in a musical	Fame	Nominated
2004	Naledi Theatre Awards	Best Female in a musical	Fame	Nominated
2010	South African Music Awards	Best English Kiddies Album	Stories From The Alphabet Tree Volume 1	Nominated
2010	World Hip Hop Awards	Best Music Video	Producer	Nominated
2010	Channel O Music Video Awards	Most Gifted West Video	Producer	Nominated
2010	Channel O Music Video Awards	Most Gifted Hip Hop Video	Producer	Won
2011	Hip Hop Awards	Best Music Video	Producer	Nominated
2011	South African Film and Television Awards	Best TV Soap Ensemble	Rhythm City	Won
2011	South African Music Awards	Best English Children's Album	Stories From The Alphabet Tree Volume 1	Won
2015	Wawela Music Awards	Best Song or Composition in a radio commercial	You Belong	Nominated
2016	Women Real Architects of Society Awards	Music Excellence		Nominated
2023	South African Film & Television Awards	Best Entertainment Programme	Miss South Africa 2022 (Black Swan Media)	Won
2023	South African Radio Awards	Promotions Stunt / event (Combined)	David Sejobe cycling to Venda	Nominated
2023	South African Radio Awards	Community project	David Sejobe cycling to Venda	Nominated
