= Gabi Le Roux =

South African music producer

Gabriel Le Roux is a South African keyboardist, composer and music producer. Trained as a classical and jazz keyboardist, he has produced platinum rock and Afrikaans music records, but he is best known for producing kwaito music with the likes of Mandoza, Lebo Mathosa, and TKZee. His most famous and top selling work is "Nkalakatha", released in 2000, which he produced for Mandoza. The single topped the charts, and the album by the same name went platinum, selling over 350,000 copies.

Le Roux started his music career as a keyboardist before moving into production, starting with a mbaqanga record he made with Themba Ngwenya in 1989. He co-founded the Kaleidosound recording studio with Tim White in Cape Town in 1995. His work has garnered five South African Music Awards, including two SAMA Song of the Year awards.

He was the subject of a complete episode of the series, The Producers, televised by M-Net on the channel Mzansi Magic.

== Allegations of unlawful enrichment at SAMRO ==
In 2019 the Southern African Music Rights Organisation (SAMRO) sued Le Roux for unlawful enrichment. According to the lawsuit, Le Roux and a number of other members of the leadership of SAMRO overpaid themselves by more than R1.6 million rand. Allegedly, Le Roux himself was irregularly overpaid by R144 000.

SAMRO would later become the centre of a scandal regarding the underpayment of royalties to artists, much of this taking place during Le Roux's time as a board member of the organisation.
