= Jumartha Majola =

South African community worker (1932–2021)

- Majola from a 1988 issue of Guiding magazine
- Born: Milase Jumartha Moyake; 15 December 1932; Port Alfred, South Africa
- Died: 16 July 2021 (aged 88); Gqeberha, South Africa
- Other name: Mhe
- Education: St Matthew's Mission College, South Africa
- Occupation: Community worker
- Spouse: Eric Majola (m. 1954)
- Children: 5
- Family: Gerald Majola (son)

Milase Jumartha Majola (15 December 1932 – 16 July 2021) was a South African community worker and social activist. She volunteered with the South African Girl Guides for 40 years. She received the Nelson Mandela University Council Africa Award in 2007.

== Personal life ==
Milase Jumartha Moyake was born in Port Alfred, South Africa, to Wallace Moyake, a post office worker and Grace. She was one of four children. The family moved to Port Elizabeth when Jumartha was a child.

She married Eric Majola (1930-1971) in 1954. At the time he was the only Black South African to have represented South Africa at cricket. They had five children, including Gerald Majola, who became Cricket South Africa's CEO. In 1976 three of her children were "bundled up and put in a van" by the police for boycotting school, and subsequently badly beaten. In 1980, the family had further trouble with the authorities after which one of her sons went into exile. These events led Majola into social activism.

== Career ==
Before her marriage, Majola earned a teaching diploma from St Matthew's Mission College, Keiskammahoek in 1951. She taught at Pendla Primary School in New Brighton, Eastern Cape for three years. In the 1950s, South African law did not permit married women to teach, so after her marriage in 1954 she worked as a receptionist for a doctor's surgery for ten years, as a secretary and a shop clerk. In 1971, Majola was appointed as an assistant recreational officer for the Bantu Administration, Ibhayi City Council, a position she held until at least 1988.

As a result of the issues her children faced with the police, she set up a youth centre in New Brighton. She would intervene "on behalf of youths who had been arrested in demonstrations or other political activities." Majola also established the Hoza Golden Age group for the elderly in 1982 and was vice-chair of the Mayoress’s Work Party. She also ran the Ivan Peter Club for 23 years.

=== Girl Guides ===
Majola joined the Girl Guide movement as a Brownie which at the time was "the only movement in the country which provided contact with all races." Majola went on to work for South Africa Girl Guides for 40 years. She started her first Girl Guide company at St Matthew's Mission College. She was a member of the South African Girl Guide Headquarters representing Guides of the East Cape. In 2007 she was still working with Guides from Kwazakhele, New Brighton and Zwide.

== Awards ==
- 1994: "Woman of the Year" Union of Jewish Women in Gqeberha - nomination
- 1995: Mayor of Port Elizabeth's "Citizen of the Year" award, youth category
- 1995: Women’s Bureau/Pick n Pay "Raymond Ackerman Award" for outstanding social responsibility - nomination
- 1998: Women’s Bureau of South Africa recognition
- 2004: "Mayoral Award for Excellence" for outstanding contribution in community development
- 2004: "Nelson Mandela Bay Municipality for Patriotic Volunteerism" certificate
- 2007: "Nelson Mandela University Council Africa" award
- 2008: "Nelson Mandela District Achievers Award" in recognition of her volunteer work
- 2008: Eastern Cape Awards "Community Builder of the Year" senior category - nomination
- 2012: "Senior Citizen of the Year between the ages 70- 80" certificate in recognition of community outreach
- 2014: "Senior Citizen of the Year"

Also Nelson Mandela University Council Prestige Award

== See also ==
- Odendaal, Andre (2003). The Story of an African Game: Black Cricketers and the Unmasking of One of Cricket's Greatest Myths, South Africa, 1850-2003. Cape Town, South Africa: David Phillip. ISBN 0 86486 638 0.
