= Bertha Egnos =

South African musician, director and composer

Bertha Egnos

Bertha Egnos (1 January 1913 – 2 July 2003) was a South African musician, director, and composer in musical theatre, best known as the co-creator and director of Ipi Tombi.

== Early life ==
Bertha "BeBe" Egnos was born and raised in a Jewish family in a suburb of Johannesburg. She was always musical, and left school as a young teen to start playing piano in a performing group. Around 1934 she left South Africa to work for the BBC in London; she also studied jazz piano with Reginald Foresythe while she was in England, and made a few solo recordings.

== Career ==
Egnos returned to South Africa by 1936. During World War II, she started and led an all-woman Drum and Bugle Band. She also started writing and directing swing music revues, with titles including Swing 1939 and Swing 1941. After the war, she wrote musical comedies. Among her shows were Bo-jungle (1959), Dingaka (1961), Eureka! (1968), and Ipi-Tombi (1974, with her daughter Gail Lakier, and 1988 “The New Generation” with nephew Geoffrey Egnos) based on an album they wrote called "The Warrior," featuring Margaret Singana.

Ipi-Tombi was a break-out global success, playing in London in 1975, and in New York in 1977, where it was picketed by anti-apartheid protesters; at the peak of its popularity, there were multiple touring companies performing the show worldwide, with attendant claims of exploitation of the performers in the various casts. Some of the songs from Ipi-Tombi were first written for Eartha Kitt when she visited South Africa (Kitt declined to use them). Despite these criticisms, an updated version of the show continues to be performed, in South Africa and elsewhere, years after Egnos's death.

== Personal life ==
Bertha Egnos married Frank Lakier, a cinema owner in Sophiatown, in 1938. They had two daughters, Gail V. Lakier and Lucille Lakier Smith, a sports scientist. Egnos and Frank Lakier divorced. Egnos's second husband was Phil Godfrey. Bertha Egnos died in 2003, aged 90 years, in Johannesburg.
