= Heat, Dust and Dreams =

Studio album by Johnny Clegg & Savuka
- Released: 1993
- Recorded: 1992
- Genres: World Music, Rock
- Length: 50:50
- Label: Capitol
- Producers: Hilton Rosenthal; Bobby Summerfield

Johnny Clegg & Savuka chronology
Cruel, Crazy Beautiful World (1989)	Heat, Dust and Dreams (1993)	Live and Rarities (1994)

Heat, Dust and Dreams is the fourth and final studio album by South African artist Johnny Clegg and his band Savuka, released in 1993, produced by Hilton Rosenthal, co-produced by Bobby Summerfield. The album received a 1993 Grammy Award nomination for Best World Music Album.

The album would be the final work of the band Savuka. It was made in honor of member Dudu Zulu, who had been assassinated in the last years of the apartheid era. Most songs of album are heavily influenced by the end of this dark period of South African history. "These Days", "When the System has Fallen", "In My African Dream" and "Your Time Will Come" all express hope for the future, while songs like "The Promise" and "Foreign Nights" talk of the problems people still have to face. "Emotional Allegiance" turns the attention to the Indian influence featuring Ashish Joshi on Tablas. It is the only Savuka album to receive the same degree of critical acclaim as the Juluka albums such as Universal Men, African Litany, Work for All and Scatterlings.

With Clegg's blessing, "The Crossing (Osiyeza)" was covered for the 2009 film Invictus.

== Track listing ==
1. "These Days" - Produced by Don Was
2. "The Crossing (Osiyeza)"
3. "I Can Never Be (What You Want Me to Be)"
4. "When the System has Fallen"
5. "Tough Enough"
6. "The Promise"
7. "Inevitable Consequence Of Progress"
8. "In My African Dream"
9. "Emotional Allegiance (Stand by Me)"
10. "Foreign Nights (Working Dog in Babylon)"
11. "Your Time Will Come"

== Personnel ==
- Johnny Clegg - vocals, guitars, concertina, mouth bow
- Mandisa Dlanga - vocals
- Solly Letwaba – bass guitar, vocals
- Derek de Beer – drums, percussion, vocals
- Keith Hutchinson – keyboards, flute, saxophone, vocals
- Steve Mavuso – keyboards, vocals
- Ashish Joshi - Tabla

== See also ==
- Another Country (Mango Groove album) (1993)
- South African Musicians' Alliance
