= Southern African Music Rights Organisation =

South African music copyright management organisation

Southern African Music Rights Organisation NPC
- Abbreviation: SAMRO
- Formation: 1961
- Type: Not for profit
- Headquarters: Braamfontein, South Africa
- Key people: Nicholas Maweni, Chairman
- Website: samro.org.za

The Southern African Music Rights Organisation (SAMRO), is a copyright asset management society. It was established by the South African Copyright Act, and aims to protect the intellectual property of music creators by licensing music users, collecting licence fees and distributing royalties to music creators. SAMRO represents more than 15,000 Southern African music composers, lyricists/authors and music publishers. The organisation administers performing rights.

== History ==
The Southern African Music Rights Organisation (name since 1974) was formed in December 1961 under the chairmanship of Dr. Gideon Roos Senior, a former Director-General of the South African Broadcasting Corporation (SABC).

SAMRO began operations in January 1962 with 40 South African composers and 13 music publishers, taking over from the UK royalty collecting society PRS. In June 1962, SAMRO was accepted as a member of the International Confederation of Societies of Authors and Composers (CISAC). In the same year, Strike Vilakazi, the composer of the anti-apartheid song Meadowlands became the first black member of SAMRO.

On 1 May 2013, SAMRO converted from a company limited by guarantee (a corporate form no longer supported by the Companies Act 71 of 2008) to a non profit company, and now operates under the name of Southern African Music Rights Organisation NPC.

In March 2014, SAMRO announced the transfer of its mechanical rights licensing operation to CAPASSO (Composers Authors and Publishers Association), as recommended by the 2012 Copyright Review Commission Report.

== Awards ==
From 2008 until at least 2020, SAMRO sponsored the Lifetime Achievement Award in Music, in the Arts & Culture Trust (ACT) Awards. Past winners have included Johnny Clegg and Caiphus Semenya.

In 2012, SAMRO commemorated its 50th anniversary with a series of events, including the Builders' Awards, which recognised musicians, staff members and others who had contributed to the organisation over the years. David "Strike" Vilakazi, Princess Constance Magogo Ka Dinizulu Buthelezi, Mzilikazi Khumalo, Dorothy Masuka, and SAMRO founder Gideon Roos Snr were all recipients of the awards.

In 2013, SAMRO launched the Wawela Music Awards to pay tribute to South African composers who have made a significant contribution on the international and local music scene. Mbongeni Ngema won the inaugural Recognition Award. It appears that the last awards were given in 2015.

SAMRO continues to sponsor the "SAMRO Highest Airplay Composer Award" at the South African Music Awards.

== Global affiliations ==
SAMRO has reciprocal agreements with 225 collecting societies in 150 countries allowing it to collect music royalties on behalf of its members around the world.

SAMRO is a member of the Confédération Internationale des Sociétés d'Auteurs et Compositeurs (CISAC). SAMRO is involved in CISAC initiatives in Africa, including projects affiliated with the World Intellectual Property Organization (WIPO), and the United Nations Educational, Scientific and Cultural Organisation (UNESCO). SAMRO is also accredited with BIEM, an organisation co-ordinating statutory license agreements among different countries.

SAMRO is associated with industry trade fairs and music showcases such as MIDEM in France and the World Music Expo (WOMEX), as well as with bodies such as the South African Music Export Council (SAMEX).

== Controversies ==
SAMRO has been implicated in a number of instances of not paying musicians the royalties that the organisation exists to collect on their behalf. In 2018 SAMRO was accused of unlawfully deducting royalties from gospel and African music artists in a scheme dating back to 1963; this resulted in a government investigation. In 2020 SAMRO was the subject of a Carte Blanche expose over their non-payment of royalties to the South African musician The Kiffness.

In 2019 the SAMRO sued a number of former executives for unlawful enrichment. According to the lawsuit, the members of the leadership of SAMRO overpaid themselves by more than R1.6 Million rand. Sipho Mabuse, Sibongile Khumalo, Loyiso Bala, Arthur Mafokate, Relebogile Mabotja, Gabi Le Roux, Jack Jeremiah Mnisi, Rowlin Naicker, Jordaan Niemand, John Edmond and Jeanne Zaidel-Rudolph were alleged to be implicated in the irregular expenditure.

SAMRO would later become the centre of a scandal regarding the underpayment of royalties to artists, much of this taking place during this leadership's time working for the organisation. In 2023, a SAMRO-sanctioned forensic investigation, run by Funduzi Forensic Services, discovered fraud by certain members. The audit noted gross irregularities, including allegations of fraudulent claims by former employees . In 2025, SAMRO announced that these dubious claims amounted to R3.4 million. In August 2025 SAMRO staff vacated their offices for an extra ordinary online meeting and denied members access to the meeting.

== See also ==
- Copyright collective
- Copyright law of South Africa
- Performance rights organisation
