= Third World Child =

Studio album by Johnny Clegg & Savuka
- Released: 1987
- Recorded: 1986–1987
- Genre: Pop rock World music
- Length: 43:16
- Label: EMI
- Producer: Hilton Rosenthal

Johnny Clegg & Savuka chronology
Third World Child (1987)	Shadow Man (1988)

Professional ratings
Review scores
Source	Rating
Allmusic	4.5/5 stars

Third World Child is the debut studio album by South African artist Johnny Clegg and his band Savuka, released in 1987 and produced by Hilton Rosenthal. Incorporating both Zulu and English lyrics, as well as political songs, it was the album which led Clegg to international fame. All songs were written by Johnny Clegg, except for "Giyani", in collaboration with V. Mavusa.

The track "Scatterlings of Africa" gave them an entry in the UK Singles Chart, reaching No. 75 in May 1987, and was featured on the soundtrack of the 1988 film Rain Man.

The album has the same name as an earlier solo album Third World Child released by Clegg in 1985. The same title track appears on both albums but the other tracks are different. The tracks "Giyani", "Shadile (Ring on Her Finger)" and "Asimbonanga (Mandela)" appeared previously on the EP Johnny Clegg & Savuka, released in 1986.

== Covers ==
The song "Great Heart" was covered by Jimmy Buffett a year after its release for his album Hot Water and became an opener for Buffett's concerts, being played in nearly every performance during the 2000 and 2003 tours. The 2000 tour was compiled into a live album, Buffett Live: Tuesdays, Thursdays, Saturdays, but "Great Heart" was left on the cutting room floor. However, many performances from the 2003 tour were captured on five out of seven of the Jimmy Buffett sound board live albums. Buffett originally heard the song after listening to Johnny Clegg cassette tapes while in France.

== Track listing ==
All tracks composed by Johnny Clegg; except where noted.

No.	Title	Writer(s)	Length
1.	"Are You Ready?"		4:02
2.	"Asimbonanga (Mandela)"		4:51
3.	"Giyani"	Clegg, V. Mavusa	4:33
4.	"Scatterlings of Africa"		3:51
5.	"Great Heart"		4:24
6.	"Missing"		4:21
7.	"Ring on Her Finger"		4:07
8.	"Third World Child"		4:16
9.	"Berlin Wall"		4:27
10.	"Don't Walk Away"		4:24

== Personnel ==
- Johnny Clegg – vocals, guitar, concertina, Umhuphe mouth bow

Savuka

- Mandisa Dlanga - vocals
- Jabu Mavuso – bass guitar, vocals
- Derek de Beer – drums, percussion, vocals
- Keith Hutchinson – keyboards, flute, saxophone, vocals
- Steve Mavuso – keyboards, vocals
- Dudu Zulu – percussion, vocals

Additional personnel

- Bobby Summerfield – mixer, recording engineer, keyboard and drum programming
