= Asimbonanga =

Song by Savuka

from the album Third World Child
- Language: Zulu, English.
- Released: 1987
- Recorded: 1986
- Genre: Afro-pop, Worldbeat, South African traditional.
- Length: 4:51
- Label: Capitol
- Songwriter: Johnny Clegg
- Producer: Hilton Rosenthal

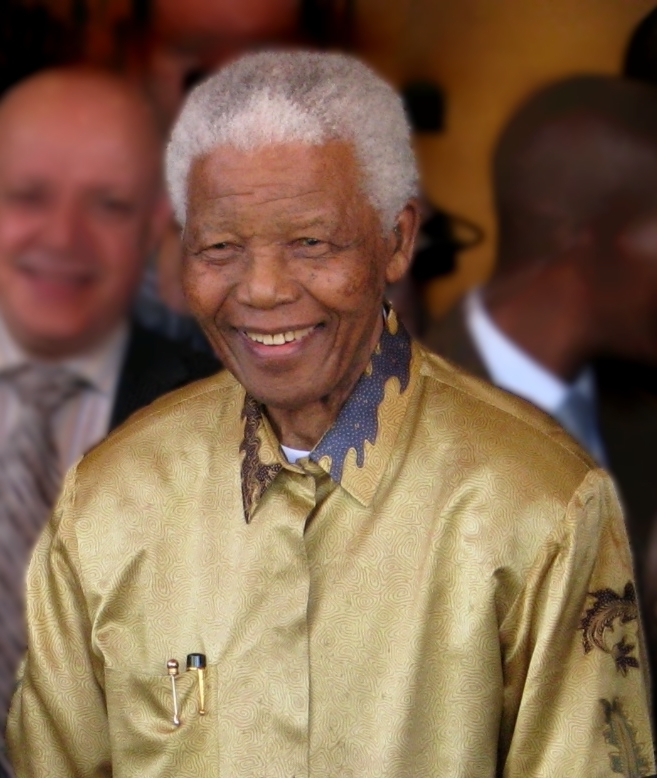
Nelson Mandela, one of the anti-apartheid activists to whom "Asimbonanga" was dedicated.

"Asimbonanga", also known as "Asimbonanga (Mandela)", is an anti-apartheid song by the South African racially integrated band Savuka. It was first released as a 12" single in 1986, and then included in their 1987 album Third World Child. It alluded to Nelson Mandela, imprisoned on Robben Island at the time of the song's release, and other anti-apartheid activists. "Asimbonanga" is a Zulu phrase that may be translated as "We have not seen him". It was well received, becoming popular within the movement against apartheid, and was covered by several artists including Joan Baez and the Soweto Gospel Choir.

== Background, lyrics, and composition ==
The Afrikaner National Party (NP) was elected to power in South Africa in 1948, and remained in control of the government for the next 46 years. The white minority held all political power during this time, and implemented the system of apartheid. Savuka was formed in 1985 by many of the members of the band Juluka, often credited with being the first racially integrated band in South Africa, though frontman Johnny Clegg has stated that that was not the case. Savuka was also a mixed-race band, containing three black South Africans and three whites. Savuka, which means "awakening" in Zulu, played music that drew on Zulu traditions as well as on Celtic music and rock music, and became popular with both black and white South Africans.

Black South African leader Nelson Mandela was imprisoned on Robben Island in 1962. "Asimbonanga" was written while he was still in prison, and its lyrics alluded to his absence from society, as well as mentioning other anti-apartheid activists by name, including Steve Biko (who was also the subject of the 1980 Peter Gabriel’s song "Biko"), Victoria Mxenge and Neil Aggett. "Asimbonanga" is a Zulu phrase that may be translated as "We have not seen him". The song, described as "elegiac", included choruses sung in Zulu and verses sung in English. The title of the song translates approximately to "We can't see him" or "We have not seen him", and refers to the "need South Africans had for their persecuted icon." "Asimbonanga" has been described as part of a trend that emerged within South African music after the 1976 Soweto uprising, of combining politically conscious lyrics with jive and dance rhythms. This style has been variously called "township jive", "township soul", and "bubblegum" (township pop).

== Release, reception and performances ==
The song was the second track on Savuka's album Third World Child, released in 1987. Johnny Clegg was credited as the composer for the song, as with the rest of the album. The song was a best-seller in France, reaching No. 2 on the singles chart. "Asimbonanga" became among the most popular anti-apartheid songs, and was adopted as an anthem by the United Democratic Front (South Africa). It has been described as among "three of the most incredible songs" written by Clegg. The music magazine The Crisis called it a "beautiful chant to Nelson Mandela", while scholar David Coplan called it a "haunting tribute". The explicit dedication of the song to Mandela, Biko, and others led to the band experiencing trouble with the police; their concerts were raided, and they were arrested repeatedly. Clegg's interest in Zulu traditional music and his work with Zulu musician Sipho Mchunu had previously gotten him into trouble with the apartheid government. Asimbonanga was among several of his songs that were banned in South Africa.

The song has been covered by numerous artists, including Joan Baez, who included it on her recording Recently. Though Baez sang in her customary vocal style, the track included backing vocals drawn from traditional South African music, arranged by Caiphus Semenya. The track brought Baez a nomination for a Grammy Award. Another notable cover was by the Soweto Gospel Choir, who performed it as a flash mob in 2013. At the Nelson Mandela 90th Birthday Tribute concert in London in 2008, Clegg, Baez, and the Soweto Gospel Choir performed the song together. At a 1999 performance by Clegg, Mandela joined the band on stage for their performance of "Asimbonanga", and danced while the song was played. After the song ended, Mandela stated "It is music and dancing that makes me at peace with the world," and asked the band to play it again. The track was included on the collection Sounds from Soweto, which contained music from ten different artists.
