= Margaret Singana =

South African musician (1938–2000)

- Also known as: Lady Africa
- Born: Margaret Nomvula M'cingana; 1938; Queenstown, Union of South Africa
- Died: 22 April 2000 (aged 62)
- Genres: World music, Afro-soul
- Occupation: Singer
- Years active: 1970s, 1980s

Margaret Singana (1938 – 22 April 2000), born Margaret M'cingana, was a South African musician. She is perhaps best known for her Xhosa song "Hamba Bhekile". An English-language version of the song, "We Are Growing", was used as soundtrack to the South African TV series Shaka Zulu.

== Early life ==
Margaret Nomvula M'cingana was born in Queenstown, Eastern Cape, South Africa, the daughter of Agnes M'cingana. In the 1950s, she moved from Queenstown to Johannesburg in the then Transvaal, where she found work as a domestic servant.

== Music career ==
While she was working as a domestic worker, Singana was discovered singing as she was cleaning. Her employers were so impressed that they recorded her voice and sent the tape to a record company. The producers of the musical Sponono, written by Alan Paton, gave her a part as a chorus singer in 1964. "Singana" was an adaptation of her surname "M'cingana", meant to make it easier for white people to pronounce.

In the 1970s, Singana started performing with The Symbols. In 1972, she made "Good Feelings" with the band, the single reached No. 2 on the old LM Hit Parade. In 1973, Singana was cast as the lead singer in the musical Ipi Tombi, and soon made herself famous with the song "Mama Tembu's Wedding". In 1977, Singana's song "I Never Loved a Man the Way I Loved You" became a hit. She had a stroke in 1980 and suffered from bad health for many years but, in 1986, she made a comeback with the song "We Are Growing", which was the theme song from the television series Shaka Zulu. "We Are Growing" became a hit in the Netherlands and Belgium in 1989, peaking at No. 1 in the former country and No. 8 in the latter. Her 1984 album Isiphiwo Sam is more traditional, with the band Bayete providing backup.

Singana received many awards, including the 1976–1977 critics award from the British magazine Music Week, and a Lifetime Achievement Award in 1999. She was known as "Lady Africa" in Southern Africa.

== Personal life and legacy ==
Singana was married to jazz bassist Mongezi Velelo. She died in April 2000, in Queenstown, after a long illness and in destitution.

In 2005, her work was remembered posthumously with a Lifetime Achievement Award at the South African Music Awards.

== Discography ==
Studio albums

- Lady Africa (1973)
- Love Is The Power (1974)
- Stand By Your Man (1975)
- Where Is The Love (1976)
- Mama Tembus Wedding
- Tribal Fence (1977)
- Nothing To Fear (1981)
- Isiphiwo Sam (1984)
