= Savuka =

Multi-racial South African band blending Zulu, Celtic, and rock music

- Savuka in 1993; L-R: Derek De Beer, Mandisa Dlanga, Solly Letwaba, Johnny Clegg, Steve Mavuso, Keith Hutchinson

Background information
- Origin: Johannesburg, South Africa
- Genres: World, Afro pop, indie rock, pop rock, Zulu music, alternative rock
- Years active: 1986–1994
- Labels: EMI, Capitol
- Past members: Johnny Clegg; Derek de Beer; Keith Hutchinson; Jabu Mavuso; Steve Mavuso; Dudu Zulu; Solly Letwaba; Mandisa Dlanga; Andy Innes

Savuka, occasionally referred to as Johnny Clegg & Savuka, was a multi-racial South African band formed in 1986 by Johnny Clegg after the disbanding of Juluka. Savuka's music blended traditional Zulu musical influences with Celtic music and rock music that had a cross-racial appeal in South Africa. Their lyrics were often bilingual in English and Zulu and they wrote several politically charged songs, particularly related to apartheid. Some better-known Savuka songs include "Asimbonanga", and "Third World Child", from their 1987 album Third World Child. Band percussionist Dudu Zulu was killed in 1992; their song "The Crossing" was a tribute to him.

== History ==
Johnny Clegg was born to an English family that moved to Rhodesia (present day Zimbabwe) when he was still a child. Clegg became interested in Zulu traditional music when he was a teenager, and sought out musicians who could teach him, including Mntonganazo Mzila, a Zulu street musician and apartment cleaner. A few years later he approached Sipho Mchunu, who was working as a gardener; though Mchunu was initially puzzled by Clegg (whose interest in Zulu music was unusual for a white South African), began to teach Clegg, and formed a musical duo with him that performed between 1970 and 1976. In 1979 they release an album called Universal Men, calling themselves Juluka (Zulu for "sweat"). During this period Clegg also learned the Zulu language, as well as Zulu dance forms. Juluka faced difficulties in their early years because apartheid-era South Africa had laws prohibiting a mixed group from performing to a white audience, or on occasion preventing the duo from being on stage together, which led to them experiencing frequent harassment from the police. Juluka has often been credited with being the first mixed-race band in South Africa, though Clegg has disputed this, stating that several mixed groups existed in the 1950s.

In 1985 Mchunu became tired with being a travelling musician, and left Juluka, being able to retire on the money he had made with the band. Clegg formed Savuka in 1986 with many musicians who had worked with Juluka. Like its predecessor Savuka was a mixed-race band, containing three black South Africans and three whites. "Savuka" is variously translated as "Awakening" or "We have arisen" in Zulu. Savuka's 1987 album Third World Child became immensely popular, and sold more than one million copies. The band subsequently toured France, Canada, and the United States. Their tour in France was sold out.

The band's political music often caused trouble with the government. The explicit dedication of their 1987 song Asimbonanga to Nelson Mandela, Steve Biko, and other anti-apartheid activists led to their concerts being raided, and band members being arrested. Clegg's interest in Zulu traditional music and his work with Zulu musician Sipho Mchunu had previously gotten him into trouble with the apartheid regime. "Asimbonanga" was among several of his songs that were banned in South Africa. Savuka also supported the "End Conscription Campaign" that began agitating against the South African military draft in 1983. In 1988 Savuka were on tour in Europe when the Nelson Mandela 70th Birthday Tribute concert took place. However, they were barred from participating as a result of the cultural boycott of South Africa in place at the time; even personal intercession from Winnie Mandela was insufficient to get them a place in the line-up. Despite this, Savuka was internationally successful, particularly in France. They became the second-best selling South African band outside the country, after Ladysmith Black Mambazo. Band dancer and percussionist Dudu Zulu was killed in 1992 while attempting to mediate a dispute between taxi groups; Savuka disbanded thereafter. Savuka's song "The Crossing" was written as a tribute to him.

== Musical style ==
Juluka's style of music, which influenced that of Savuka, was based on a fusion of pop music, Zulu music, and mbaqanga. The band played music that drew on Zulu traditions as well as on Celtic music and rock music. Their sound was based more on electronic music and strong rhythm than Juluka's. By the time of their third album Cruel, Crazy, Beautiful World, the band had moved further away from traditional melodies and played music influenced by popular Western styles. These influences included funk, drawn particularly from The Artist Formerly Known as Prince, and the politically charged music written by Sting. The 1987 Asimbonanga was part of a trend that emerged within South African music after the 1976 Soweto uprising, of combining politically conscious lyrics with jive and dance rhythms. The style has been variously called "township jive", "township soul", and "bubblegum." Their songs were frequently bilingual. In 1988 The Washington Post described their music as "supple polyrhythms and bilingual, politically charged songs". Music magazine The Crisis described their style as blending several interesting instruments, tempo, and vocal styles; some songs "require dancing", while others were "haunting political comments". During concerts, Clegg would often draw upon his anthropology training to provide a brief historical or cultural anecdote or explanation about Zulu culture, and these "mini-lectures" became a popular feature of Savuka's live performances.

== Selected discography ==
Albums

- 1987: Third World Child
- 1988: Shadow Man (#31 Canada)
- 1989: Cruel, Crazy, Beautiful World (#67 Canada)
- 1993: Heat, Dust and Dreams

Songs

- "Asimbonanga"
- "Third World Child"
- "The Crossing (Osiyeza)"
- "Dela"
- "Cruel Crazy Beautiful World"
- "Scatterlings of Africa"

== Members ==
- Johnny Clegg – guitar, concertina, vocals (1986 – 1994; died 2019).
- Steve Mavuso – keyboards, vocals (1986 – 1994).
- Keith Hutchinson – saxophone, keyboards, vocals (1986 – 1994).
- Derek de Beer – drums (1986 – 1994).
- Mandisa Dlanga – vocals (1986 – 1994).
- Dudu Zulu – percussion, vocals (1986 – 1992; died 1992).
- Jabu Mavuso – bass (1986 – 1987).
- Solly Letwaba – bass (1987 – 1994; died 2001).
- Andy Innes – guitar, mandolin, vocals (1992 – 1994).
