= Meadowlands, Gauteng =

Meadowlands
- Location within Gauteng Location within South Africa
- Coordinates: 26°13′15″S 27°53′58″E
- Country: South Africa
- Province: Gauteng
- Municipality: City of Johannesburg
- Main Place: Soweto

Area
  - Total: 11.57 km^{2} (4.47 sq mi)

Population (2001)
  - Total: 138,354
  - Density: 11,960/km^{2} (30,970/sq mi)

Racial makeup (2001)
  - Black African: 99.8%
  - Coloured: 0.2%

First languages (2001)
  - Zulu: 32.7%
  - Tswana: 27.0%
  - Sotho: 10.5%
  - Tsonga: 10.1%
  - Other: 19.7%
- Time zone: UTC+2 (SAST)
- Postal code (street): 1852
- PO box: 1851

Meadowlands is a suburb of Soweto, Gauteng Province, South Africa. It was founded in the early 1950s during the apartheid era for black residents from Sophiatown.

== History ==
Meadowlands, also known as Ndofaya, has its origin with the introduction of the Natives Resettlement Act, Act No 19 of 1954 with its aim to move black people out of the centre of Johannesburg from multi-cultural areas such as Sophiatown and the Western Native Townships. The Urban Resettlement Board was created and the forced removals began on 10 February 1955 and would continue until the mid-sixties when most of the new township had been completed. Early residents were separated into new zones of the township based on their ethnic background and identifiable by the street names.

The Johannesburg City Council, at the time controlled by the United Party, did not participate in the forced removals but did provide extra land in Diepkloof when space ran out in Meadowlands when black people from the suburbs of Martindale and Newclare needed areas to settle. The Johannesburg City Council did not control the area as it did with Soweto, but would be made to cover the cost of the relocations. By 1968, the Natives Resettlement Board had relocated 22,500 black families and 6,500 single persons in both Meadowlands and Diepkloof and would administer both areas as they had not yet been allocated to any white municipality.

The forced move away from Sophiatown inspired Strike Vilakazi to compose Meadowlands. As with many other protest songs of this period, Meadowlands was made popular both within and outside South Africa by Miriam Makeba.

By 1973, now known as Diepmeadow, the administration was taken over by the West Rand Administration Board (WRAB) and by 1978, a Diepmeadows Town Council was formed to run the two townships when they decided not to join Soweto Council.

== Notable people from Meadowlands ==
- Sindi Dlathu, actress known for her role as Lindiwe Dikana on The River. Lived in Zone 10.
- Vusi Kunene, actor
- Thandiswa Mazwai, singer. Lived some years in her childhood in Meadowlands
- Kgalema Motlanthe, third president of South Africa. Lived in Zone 8.
- Rapulana Seiphemo, actor
- Sibusiso Vilakazi, Mamelodi Sundowns soccer player.
- Jacob Matlala, junior flyweight boxing champion
- Trompies, Kwaito music group from South Africa
