= Natives Resettlement Act, 1954 =

Repealed South African law

Parliament of South Africa
- Long title: Act to provide for the removal of natives from any area in the magisterial district of Johannesburg or any adjoining magisterial district and their settlement elsewhere, and for that purpose to establish a board and to define its functions; and to provide for other incidental matters.
- Citation: Act No. 19 of 1954
- Enacted by: Parliament of South Africa
- Royal assent: 4 June 1954
- Commenced: 1 August 1954
- Repealed: 1 April 1984
- Administered by: Minister of Native Affairs

Repealed by
- Black Communities Development Act, 1984
- Status: Repealed

The Natives Resettlement Act, Act No 19 of 1954, formed part of the apartheid system of racial segregation in South Africa. It permitted the removal of blacks from any area within and next to the magisterial district of Johannesburg by the South African government. This act was designed to remove blacks from Sophiatown to Meadowlands.

== Content of the Act ==
The following is a brief description of the sections of the Natives Resettlement Act:

Section 1

Defined the meanings of common words within the Act.

Section 2

Defined the name of the Board as the Natives Resettlement Board and in the legal form of a body corporate. It would also be liable for no tax.

Section 3

Defined the Board size as no less than nine members and maximum ten appointed by the Governor-General as is its chairman. At least 4-5 members were nominated by the Minister of Native Affairs with all members announced in the Government Gazette.

Section 4

Defines the length of time of a Board member's tenure and what grounds terminates that tenure.

Section 5

Defines the Boards meeting times, the quorum sizes, voting and conflict of interest procedures.

Section 6

Defined how the remuneration of the board members were established.

Section 7

Defined the establishment of an executive committee consisting of the chairman and two board members that performed the daily functions of the Board based on the direction and review by the board.

Section 8

Defined the penalties for bribery and fraud committed by members or officers and for disclosing the work of the Board to others without consent.

Section 9

Defined the staffing of the Board and how they would be remunerated.

Section 10

Defined how the Board would be funded such as by the State, returns from land sales of its own assets, fines and when necessary from the City of Johannesburg's own native services levy fund.

Section 11

Defined the Auditor-General's right to audit the Boards accounts.

Section 12

Defined the objectives of the Board being the removal from specified areas of non-whites and provide new settlements after such removals. It defined the right to purchase, sell, exchange and expropriate land to achieve this objective. The ability to develop the land it owned with services and amenities. The City of Johannesburg would be required to carry out any town planning when required.

Section 13

Defined the Board's right to have the City of Johannesburg connect its drainage, water and electricity services to the Board land as well as any streets.

Section 14

Defined the Boards requirement to submit a yearly report to the Minister of Native Affairs and parliament

Section 15

Defined the legal procedures for the extinction or modification of any restrictions on land.

Section 16

Defined the legal procedures for the expropriation of land the Board needed to achieve its objectives.

Section 17

Defined the procedure as to how the Board would expropriate land which included serving notice which would describe the land in detail and requiring the owner to state what the amount the land was worth. It describes how the notice will be served and the length of time until expropriation as being thirty days.

Section 18

Defines the duties of the Register of Deeds when land has been expropriated.;

Section 19

Defines the appointment of arbitrators and referees if after sixty days from expropriation, the land owner does not agree with the amount paid for his land. The referees decision would be final.

Section 20

Defined the basis for determining the amount of compensation for land that has been expropriated.

Section 21

Defined how the compensation payments for land was paid especially if the owner was not known.

Section 22

Defined the registration of transfer of expropriated land.

Section 23

Defined how the Board would make land available to non-whites in lieu of land the Board had acquired.

Section 24

Defined that the Boards land would be exempt from rates until leased or sold.

Section 25

Defined the procedure for issuing the notices to vacate a premises in a specified area which was no earlier than last day of the month after the notice was given.

Section 26

Defined the procedures the Board would follow if the person failed to vacate the premises. Was subject to a magisterial approval and protected the inspectors, police and officials that carried out the order.

Section 27

Defined the chairman's ability to appoint inspectors and details the rights of those inspectors to enter premises, question occupants, request and inspect ownership documents. It also defines the use of interpreters and for legal purposes be regarded as an inspector.

Section 28

Defined the rights of the Board, subject to the Minister's of Native Affairs and Finance, to transfer Board land and improvements to the City of Johannesburg with no more than 3 months notice without refusal and the latter pay the costs of the land and improvements and any interest and expenses in removing the non-white residents. It also required the city's to apply to Native Affairs to have said land declared a non-white township.

Section 29

Defined the power of the Board if the City of Johannesburg neglected to carry out the requirements stated in the Act. The Transvaal Administrator could give the Board the same powers as the city to carry out the land and people transfers with the cost to recovered from the city by court means or levies or deduction of funds by the province.

Section 30

Defined the ability of the Board to become an urban local authority and the powers of that body to manage an area under the Boards control.

Section 31

Defined how the Board could be abolished and who has that authority and that its liabilities and obligations would return to the Minister of Native Affairs

Section 32

Defined that the City of Johannesburg rights, assets acquired, liabilities and obligations incurred prior to Act remain for any objectives to be carried out by the Board.

Section 33

Defined the Minister of Native Affairs ability to make regulations for the Board not covered by the act such as land improvements, land vacation, powers of inspectors, rules for expropriation proceedings, tender procedures. Set penalties for contraventions of these regulations. Force changes to building improvements at the persons expense. These regulations place before parliament for approval.

Section 34

Defined what is an offence under this Act or its regulations and the penalty if found guilty in a Magistrates court and that the fines paid would go to the Board.

Section 35

Defined that Sophiatown, Martindale and Newclare not to be regarded as areas predominantly occupied by natives.

Section 36

Defined the name of the Act and when it comes into operation.
