= Dudu Mntowaziwayo Ndlovu =

Dudu Mntowaziwayo Ndlovu (25 December 1957 – 4 May 1992), popularly known as Dudu Zulu, was a Zulu dancer, percussionist, and singer with the South African bands Juluka and (later) Savuka. Ndlovu danced alongside his bandmate Johnny Clegg for many years, both on-stage and on the streets of Soweto and Jeppestown.

In May 1992, while walking to his home in Esiphongweni from a neighbour's house, Dudu was fatally shot at close range. The attack took place on a dusty track near Greytown in KwaZulu-Natal (at the time Natal). It's uncertain whether Ndlovu was targeted, or if he was mistaken for someone else. Other citizens had been shot "in error" in a local taxi war.

The following year, Johnny Clegg and Savuka recorded a final album together: Heat, Dust and Dreams. Clegg wrote the song "The Crossing (Osiyeza)" as a tribute to Ndlovu, referring to the crossing from life to death.
