= Azimuth (disambiguation) =

Azimuth is an angular measurement in a spherical coordinate system.

Azimuth may also refer to:

- Azimuth (airline), a Russian airline
- Azimuth (band), a British jazz trio active from 1977 to 2000
  - Azimuth (album), the trio's debut album
- Azymuth, Brazilian band
- Azimuth Hill, Antarctica
- Azimuth Islands, Antarctica
- Azimuth Systems, an American wireless technology company
- General Alister Azimuth, a character in the Ratchet & Clank video game series
- Azimuth, a Marvel Comics character and member of the Marauders
