= Bob Cornford =

British jazz pianist and composer

Robert Leslie "Bob" Cornford (15 May 1940 – 18 July 1983) was a British jazz pianist and composer.

== Early life ==
Cornford was born in Brazil to British nationals. He received classical training in music, including studies at the Royal College of Music.

== Career ==
Cornford joined the ensemble of John Dankworth in the 1960s while working as an arranger and orchestrator on for the BBC, and he composed for the NDR Radiophilharmonie and the DR Big Band. The NDR perform Cornford's Coalescence and In Memoriam.

Beginning in 1977, Cornford was a member of the band Axel with Tony Coe and in 1983 performed with Lee Konitz. He also worked with Phil Lee, Alan Skidmore, Bobby Wellins, Kenny Wheeler, Chris Laurence, Humphrey Lyttelton, Palle Mikkelborg, Mark Murphy, Pat Smythe, Trevor Tomkins, and Norma Winstone and accompanied vocalists such as Scott Walker and Gitte Haenning.

== Death ==
Cornford died of a heart attack in 1983.

== Discography ==
- Windmill Tilter: The Story of Don Quixote, John Dankworth and Kenny Wheeler (1969)
- Cool Beat (Studio G, 1974)
- Perception (KPM Music, 1981)
- Tournée du Chat, Tony Coe (Nato, 1983)
- Music for the Movies with Tony Kinsey (KPM, 1982)
- Traditions with Richard Harvey (KPM, 1983)
- Long Shadows with Tony Coe, Kenny Wheeler and the NDR 'Pops' Orchestra (Chapter One, 2007)
