= Somewhere Called Home =

Studio album by Norma Winstone
- Released: 1987
- Recorded: July 1986
- Studio: Rainbow Studio; Oslo, Norway
- Genre: Jazz
- Length: 47:47
- Label: ECM 1337
- Producer: Manfred Eicher

Norma Winstone chronology
Live at Roncella Jonica (1985)	Somewhere Called Home (1987)	M.A.P. (1990)

Somewhere Called Home is an album by English jazz singer and lyricist Norma Winstone recorded in July 1986 and released on ECM the following year. The trio features pianist John Taylor and reed player Tony Coe.

== Reception ==
The Allmusic review by Stephen Cook awarded the album 4½ stars, stating: "It's not only a watermark of Winstone's career but, in the long line of modern vocal outings released since the romantic vocal tradition of Fitzgerald and Vaughan ended with free jazz and fusion, the disc stands out as one most original yet idyllic of vocal jazz recordings."

Mezzo called Somewhere Called Home "a classic vocal album".

Writing for ECM blog Between Sound and Space Tyran Grillo writes: "After her stunning contributions to ECM via the enigmatic outfit known as Azimuth, jazz vocalist Norma Winstone broke out, or should I say broke in, her solo career with Somewhere Called Home.... She lends her sympathetic draw to the canonic tree while also hanging it with her own lyric adornments to the music of Egberto Gismonti, Ralph Towner, and Kenny Wheeler. The finished session is burnished to a dim reflection of yesteryear."

Professional ratings
Review scores
Source	Rating
AllMusic	4/5 stars

== Track listing ==
1. "Cafe" (Egberto Gismonti/Norma Winstone) – 7:56
2. "Somewhere Called Home" (Pat Smythe/Fran Landesman) – 4:22
3. "Sea Lady" (Kenny Wheeler/Norma Winstone) – 4:23
4. "Some Time Ago" (Sergio Mihanovich/Margaret Busby) – 5:38
5. "Prologue" (Bill Evans/Norma Winstone) – 3:58
6. "Celeste" (Ralph Towner/Norma Winstone) – 6:12
7. "Hi Lili Hi Lo" (Bronislaw Kaper/Helen Deutsch) – 4:28
8. "Out of This World" (Harold Arlen/Johnny Mercer) – 5:55
9. "Tea For Two" (Vincent Youmans/Irving Caesar) – 4:55

== Personnel ==
- Norma Winstone – voice
- John Taylor – piano
- Tony Coe – clarinet, tenor saxophone
