= John Taylor (jazz) =

British jazz pianist (1942–2015)

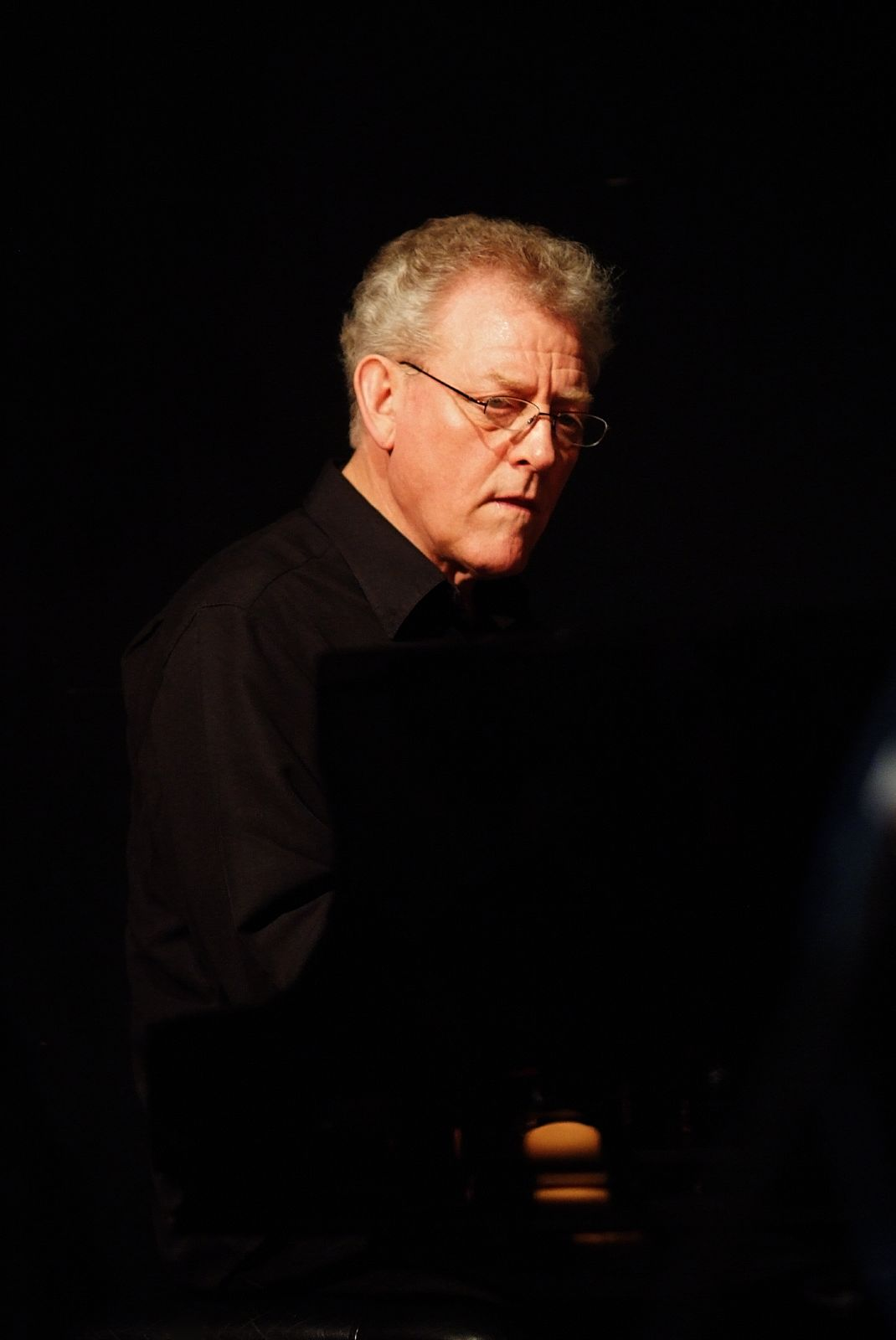
- Taylor in 2008

Background information
- Born: 25 September 1942; Manchester, England
- Died: 17 July 2015 (aged 72) Segré, France
- Genre: Jazz
- Occupations: Musician, composer
- Instruments: Piano, organ, synthesiser
- Years active: 1969–2015

John Taylor (25 September 1942 – 17 July 2015) was a British jazz pianist, born in Manchester, England, who occasionally performed on the organ and the synthesizer. In his obituary, The Guardian described him as "one of the great jazz pianists and composers of his generation" and at a musical level comparable to Herbie Hancock, Chick Corea, Keith Jarrett, McCoy Tyner and Brad Meldhau.

== Early life ==
John Taylor was a self-taught pianist. With his family, he moved from Manchester, first to the Midlands and then to Hastings where he played locally. In 1964, Taylor became a civil servant, moved to London and became involved in the free jazz scene.

== Performing career ==
Taylor first came to the attention of the jazz community in 1969, when he partnered with saxophonists Alan Skidmore and John Surman. He was later reunited with Surman in the short-lived group Morning Glory and, in the 1980s, with Miroslav Vitous's quartet.

In the early 1970s, Taylor was accompanist to the singer Cleo Laine and started to compose for his own sextet. He also worked with many visiting artists at Ronnie Scott's Jazz Club in London, and later became a member of Scott's quintet.

In 1977, Taylor formed the trio Azimuth, with Norma Winstone and Kenny Wheeler. On some of the group's recordings, Taylor played synthesiser and organ. The group was described by Richard Williams as "one of the most imaginatively conceived and delicately balanced contemporary chamber-jazz groups". The trio made several recordings for ECM Records and performed in Europe, the US and Canada.

The 1980s saw Taylor working with groups led by Jan Garbarek, Enrico Rava, Gil Evans, Lee Konitz and Charlie Mariano, as well as performing in duos with Tony Coe and Steve Argüelles. Composing projects included a commission for the English choir Cantamus Girls Choir with Lee Konitz and Steve Argüelles and pieces for the Hannover Radio Orchestra with Stan Sulzmann. Taylor also performed on David Sylvian's song "Laughter and Forgetting", on which Kenny Wheeler also featured.

From 2006, Taylor was a member of Kenny Wheeler's quartet and large ensemble and performed in duo and quartet settings with John Surman; their recording of Ambleside Days on ahum won critical acclaim. In 1996 Taylor played organ on Surman's choral work Proverbs and Songs from Salisbury Cathedral, later released on ECM Records. During the 1990s, he made several recordings also for ECM with Peter Erskine's trio with Palle Danielsson on bass.

In 2000, Taylor made a new collaboration with Azimuth and the Smith Quartet for the Weimar Festival. Also in that year, he recorded Verso with Maria Pia De Vito and Ralph Towner.

Taylor celebrated his 60th birthday in 2002 with a Contemporary Music Network Tour, in which he presented his new trio with drummer Joey Baron and Marc Johnson on bass. The tour also featured the Creative Jazz Orchestra playing Taylor's composition "The Green Man Suite". In July 2002, Taylor received the BBC Jazz Award for 'Best New Work' for this suite.

Taylor's trio recording with Johnson and Baron was released early in 2003, and September 2003 saw the release of his solo CD Insight on Sketch. John Fordham wrote in The Guardian: "This is one of contemporary jazz's great performers at work ... a beautiful solo statement by a very modest star." In 2004, Taylor recorded Where Do We Go from Here? in duo with Kenny Wheeler and Nightfall with bassist Charlie Haden. They subsequently performed at the Montreal International Jazz Festival. Also that year Taylor formed a new trio with Palle Danielsson and Martin France. They performed at the Vancouver Jazz Festival and recorded Angel of the Presence for CAM Jazz. This recording was released in January 2006 to coincide with their UK tour and has received critical acclaim.

== Keyboard style ==
While Taylor's unique piano style drew on the whole of the jazz pallette and considerable influence from classical music, his approach was characterised by a sophisticated and advanced rhythmic and harmonic sensibility. Rhythmically he specialised in asymmetrical meters and in employing "drumming" patterns on the keyboard. Harmonically, he significantly developed and expanded the harmonic vocabulary of musicians such as Bill Evans and Gil Evans.

== Teaching ==
Taylor was professor of Jazz Piano at the Cologne College of Music from 1993 onwards, and became a lecturer in jazz at University of York in 2005. He coached and taught undergraduate jazz musicians and was of central importance to the new master's degree jazz pathway and in advancing doctoral research and performance in jazz.

== Family ==
Taylor was married to jazz vocalist Norma Winstone from 1972 until their divorce. The couple had two sons: Leo Taylor, a drummer with indie rock band The Invisible; and Alex Taylor, a singer-songwriter. John Taylor was married to Diana (née de Courcy) until her death in 2004 from cancer, and his subsequent marriage to childhood sweetheart Carol Weston, lasted for the rest of his life.

== Death ==
Taylor died on 17 July 2015, following a heart attack he suffered while performing at the Saveurs Jazz Festival in Segré, France. Although he was resuscitated at the venue, he died after being taken to hospital.

== Discography ==
=== As leader ===
Date	Line-up	Album title	Label	Notes
1971	octet w/ Norma Winstone, Stan Sulzmann, John Surman, Kenny Wheeler, Chris Pyne, Chris Laurence, Tony Levin	Pause, and Think Again	Turtle	produced by John Surman; re-released 1995 on FMR
1973	John Taylor Trio w/ Chris Laurence, Tony Levin	Decipher	MPS/BASF	cd released in Japan in 1998, remastered in 2000 and again in 2016; German reissue in 2017 by edel
1991	John Taylor Trio w/ Mick Hutton, Steve Argüelles	Blue Glass	Ronnie Scott's Jazz House	live recording
1992	w/ John Surman	Ambleside Days	Ah Um	
1992	solo	Solo	Sentemo	
2001	w/ The Creative Jazz Orchestra (octet w/ Julian and Steve Argüelles a.o.)	Exits and Entrances	Oh No!	
2002	w/ Kenny Wheeler, Riccardo del Fra	Overnight	Sketch	
2003	w/ Marc Johnson, Joey Baron	Rosslyn	ECM	
2003	solo	Insight	Sketch	
2005	solo	Songs and Variations	CAM Jazz	
2005	w/ Steve Swallow, Gabriele Mirabassi	New Old Age	EGEA	
2005	w/ Palle Danielsson, Martin France	Angel of the Presence	CAM Jazz	
2007	w/ Palle Danielsson, Martin France	Whirlpool	CAM Jazz	recorded 2005
2009	solo	Phases	CAM Jazz	recorded 2006
2011	w/ Palle Danielsson, Martin France	Requiem for a Dreamer	CAM Jazz	recorded 2008
2012	w/ Palle Danielsson, Martin France	Giulia's Thursdays	CAM Jazz	recorded 2006
2014	solo	In Two Minds	CAM Jazz	recorded 2011
2015	w/ Alex Taylor, Oren Marshall, Leo Taylor	2081	CAM Jazz	recorded 2014

=== With Norma Winstone and/or Kenny Wheeler ===
Date	Artist	Album title	Label
1972	Norma Winstone (w/ large ensemble)	Edge of Time	Argo
1973	Kenny Wheeler (w/ large ensemble)	Song for Someone	Incus
1977	Azimuth	Azimuth	ECM
1978	Azimuth	The Touchstone	ECM
1979	Azimuth with Ralph Towner	Départ	ECM
1984	Kenny Wheeler (quintet) w/ Mike Brecker, Dave Holland, Jack DeJohnette	Double, Double You	ECM
1985	Azimuth	Azimuth '85	ECM
1985, 1996	Norma Winstone, Kenny Wheeler, Paolo Fresu, John Taylor, Paolo Damiani, Tony Oxley	Live at Roccella Jonica	Ismez/Polis, Splasc(H)
1987	Norma Winstone (trio) w/ Tony Coe	Somewhere Called Home	ECM
1987	Kenny Wheeler Quintet w/ Stan Sulzmann, Dave Holland, Bill Elgart	Flutter By, Butterfly	Soul Note
1990	Kenny Wheeler (feat. Norma Winstone a.o.)	Music for Large and Small Ensembles	ECM
1990	Kenny Wheeler Quintet w/ John Abercrombie, Dave Holland, Peter Erskine	The Widow in the Window	ECM
1992	Kenny Wheeler (tentet; JT on three of seven tracks)	Kayak	Ah Um
1994	Azimuth	How It Was Then... Never Again	ECM
1997	Kenny Wheeler (quartet w/ Joe LaBarbera, Riccardo del Fra)	All the More (rec. 1993)	Soul Note
1997	Kenny Wheeler, John Taylor, Norma Winstone w/ The Maritime Jazz Orchestra	Siren's Song	Justin Time
1999	Norma Winstone & John Taylor (duo)	Like Song, Like Weather (rec. 1996)	Koch Jazz
1999	Kenny Wheeler (w/ large ensemble)	A Long Time Ago	ECM
2001	Kenny Wheeler (trio w/ Gabriele Mirabassi)	Moon	Egea
2002	The Maritime Jazz Orchestra feat. Kenny Wheeler, John Taylor, Norma Winstone	Now and Now Again (rec. 1998)	Justin Time
2005	Kenny Wheeler (duo)	Where Do We Go from Here?	CAM Jazz
2005	Kenny Wheeler (quartet w/ Chris Potter, Dave Holland)	What Now?	CAM Jazz
2011	Kenny Wheeler w/ Hugo Wolf String Quartet	Other People	CAM Jazz
2011	Kenny Wheeler (trio) w/ Steve Swallow	One of Many	CAM Jazz
2012	Kenny Wheeler Big Band	The Long Waiting	CAM Jazz
2013	Kenny Wheeler (sextet w/ Stan Sulzmann, Bobby Wellins)	Six for Six (rec. 2008)	CAM Jazz
2015	Kenny Wheeler (duo)	On the Way to Two (rec. 2005)	CAM Jazz

=== As co-leader and sideman ===
Line-ups in brackets indicate that names or format are not mentioned on the album front cover. Recordings with artists without wiki entry (for the most part), and the seldom guest appearances were not included. For initial alphabetical order of artists reload the page.

Date	Artist	Album title	Label
1981	Arild Andersen w/ Bill Frisell, Alphonse Mouzon	A Molde Concert	ECM
1975	Neil Ardley, Ian Carr, Mike Gibbs and Stan Tracey	Will Power - A Shakespeare Birthday Celebration in Music	Argo
1991	Julian Argüelles (quartet w/ Mick Hutton, Martin France)	Phaedrus	Ah Um
2014	Julian Argüelles (quartet w/ Dave Holland and Martin France)	Circularity	CAM Jazz
2013	Pierluigi Balducci w/ Paul McCandless & Michele Rabbia	Blue from Heaven	Dodicilune
2017	Pierluigi Balducci, Paul McCandless & Michele Rabbia	Evansiana	Dodicilune
1970	Harry Beckett (octet w/ Surman, Osborne, Skidmore, Ricotti, Laurence a.o.)	Flare Up	Philips
1971	Harry Beckett (sextet)	Warm Smiles	RCA Victor
1972	Harry Beckett's S & R Powerhouse Sections (septet)	Themes for Fega	RCA Victor
2009	Tore Brunborg, Thomas Strønen (trio) as Meadow	Blissful Ignorance	Hecca
1993	Ian Carr (duo w/ JT organ)	Sounds and Sweet Airs (That Giveth Delight & Hurt Not)	Celestial Harmonies
2015	Hayden Chisholm (trio w/ Matt Penman)	Breve	Pirouet
1970	Graham Collier (tentet)	Songs for My Father	Fontana
1970	Mike Cooper (w/ Alan Skidmore, Mike Osborne a.o.)	Trout Steel	Dawn
1972	Paolo Damiani's Musica Mu(n)ta Orchestra (w/ Lindsay Cooper, Gianluigi Trovesi, Fresu, Lauren Newton, Winstone a.o.)	Annìnnìa	Ismez/Polis
1972	John Dankworth Big Band	Full Circle	Philips
1998	Maria Pia de Vito (quintet w/ Gianluigi Trovesi)	Phoné	Egea
2000	Maria Pia de Vito, Ralph Towner (trio)	Verso	Provocateur
2000	Maria Pia de Vito (w/ Towner, Swallow, Patrice Héral)	Nel respiro	Provocateur
1978	Martin Drew Band (quintet w/ Bill Le Sage, Brian Smith a.o.)	British Jazz Artists Vol. 3	Lee Lambert
1979	Jon Eardley (quintet w/ Pete King, Mickey Roker a.o.)	Namely Me	Spotlite
1992	Peter Erskine (trio) w/ Palle Danielsson	You Never Know	ECM
1993	Peter Erskine (trio) w/ Palle Danielsson	Time Being	ECM
1994	Peter Erskine (trio) w/ Palle Danielsson	As It Is	ECM
1999	Peter Erskine (trio) w/ Palle Danielsson	Juni	ECM
1983	Gil Evans (w/ Surman, Sulzmann, Don Weller, Ray Russell a.o.)	The British Orchestra	Mole Jazz
2006	Mark Feldman	What Exit	ECM
1993	Paolo Fresu (trio) w/ Furio di Castri	EncontroS	Egea
1977	Jan Garbarek	Places	ECM
1978	Jan Garbarek	Photo with Blue Sky, White Cloud, Wires, Windows and a Red Roof	ECM
1971	Mike Gibbs (big) Band	Tanglewood 63	Deram
1972	Mike Gibbs (big band)	Just Ahead	Polydor
1993	Mike Gibbs Orchestra (w/ Wheeler, Evan Parker, Charlie Mariano, Swallow a.o.)	By the Way	Ah Um
2018	Mike Gibbs (big) Band (feat. John Scofield w/ Wheeler, Argüelles, Tony Coe, Swallow, Bill Stewart	Symphony Hall, Birmingham 1991	Dusk Fire
2004	Charlie Haden (duo)	Nightfall	Naim
1970	Don "Sugarcane" Harris (w/ Volker Kriegel, Tony Oxley a.o.)	Keep on Driving	MPS/BASF
1988	Lee Konitz (duo)	Songs of the Stars	Jazz House
1971	Volker Kriegel (quintet)	Spectrum	MPS/BASF
1972	Volker Kriegel (octet w/ Albert Mangelsdorff, Eberhard Weber a.o.)	Inside: Missing Link	MPS/BASF
1973	Volker Kriegel (septet w/ Weber, Zbigniew Seifert a.o.)	Lift!	MPS/BASF
1971	Cleo Laine with the John Dankworth Quartet	Cleo Laine in Australia	World Record Club
1973	Bobby Lamb and the Keymen (tentet)	Bobby Lamb and the Keymen	BBC
2011	Marilyn Mazur w/ Josefine Cronholm & Anders Jormin	Celestial Circle	ECM
1991	Nick Purnell (big band w/ Wheeler, Gibbs, Argüelles, Django Bates, Erskine a.o.)	Onetwothree	Ah Um
1987	Enrico Rava (quintet w/ Bruce Ditmas a.o.) as Rava	Secrets	Soul Note
1971	Frank Ricotti & Michael de Albuquerque (quintet)	First Wind	Pegasus
1977	Ronnie Scott's Quintet	Serious Gold	Pye
1969	Alan Skidmore Quintet	Once Upon a Time	Deram
1970	Alan Skidmore Quintet	TCB	Philips
2003	Tommy Smith Sextet (w/ Joe Lovano, John Scofield, John Patitucci, Bill Stewart)	Evolution	Spartacus
1981	Soft Machine	Land of Cockayne	EMI
1970	Splinter (w/ Tom Scott, Chris Spedding a.o.)	Harder to Live	Dark Horse
1979	Louis Stewart w/ Sam Jones and Billy Higgins	I Thought About You	Livia
1987	Stan Sulzmann (duo)	Everybody's Song but My Own?	Loose Tubes
1988	Stan Sulzmann, Frank Ricotti, Tony Hymas, Chris Laurence	Aspects of Paragonne	MMC/EMI
2016	Stan Sulzmann (duo)	Double Exposure (rec. 1990)	InVersion
1970	John Surman (big band)	How Many Clouds Can You See?	Deram
1971	John Surman, Barre Phillips, Stu Martin as The Trio (plus big band w/ Wheeler, Beckett, Skidmore, Osborne, Chick Corea, Dave Holland a.o.)	Conflagration	Dawn
1971	John Surman / John Warren	Tales of the Algonquin	Deram
1972	John Surman, Alan Skidmore, Tony Oxley a.o.	Jazz in Britain '68–'69	Decca Eclipse
1973	John Surman (sextet)	Morning Glory	Island
1993	John Surman Quartet	Stranger Than Fiction	ECM
1996	John Surman (duo w/ chorus, JT organ)	Proverbs and Songs	ECM
2005	John Surman (quartet)	Way Back When (rec. 1969)	Cuneiform
1995	Steve Swallow (duo)	Parlance	Instant Present
2008	Diana Torto (trio) w/ Anders Jormin	Triangoli	Egea/Astarte
1993, 1997	Colin Towns Mask Orchestra w/ Skidmore, Surman, Nigel Hitchcock a.o.	Mask Orchestra (Bolt from the Blue)	The Jazz Label, Provocateur
1982	Miroslav Vitouš	Journey's End	ECM
1998	Eric Vloeimans w/ Marc Johnson and Joey Baron	Bitches and Fairy Tales	Challenge
2000	Eric Vloeimans w/ di Castri and Joe LaBarbera	Umai	Challenge
1973	Ray Warleigh w/ Ron Mathewson, Frank Gibson	Reverie	Vinyl
1971	Mike Westbrook Orchestra	Metropolis	Neon/RCA Victor
1998	Bruno Castellucci Quintet w/Stan Sulzmann, Uli Beckerhoff, Dieter llg	Lost and Found	Quetzal Records
