= Decipher (disambiguation) =

Decipherment is the analysis of documents written in ancient languages.

Decipher may also refer to:

- Decipher (novel), the novel by Stel Pavlou
- Decipher (After Forever album), 2001 album
- Decipher (John Taylor album)
- Decipher, Inc., a game publisher based in Norfolk, Virginia, United States
- DECIPHER, database of chromosome abnormalities identified from analysis of patient DNA
- DECIPHER (software), a program for deciphering and managing biological sequences
