= Music for Large & Small Ensembles =

Studio album by Kenny Wheeler
- Released: 1990
- Recorded: January–February 1990
- Studio: CTS Studio; London, England; Rainbow Studio; Oslo, Norway
- Genre: Jazz
- Length: 103:42
- Label: ECM; ECM 1415/16
- Producer: Manfred Eicher

Kenny Wheeler chronology
Flutter By, Butterfly (1988)	Music for Large & Small Ensembles (1990)	The Widow in the Window (1990)

Music for Large & Small Ensembles is a double album by Canadian jazz trumpeter Kenny Wheeler recorded over two sessions in January and February 1990 and released on ECM later that year. 'The Sweet Time Suite' marked Wheeler's first return to extended composition for big band since 1969's Windmill Tilter.

== Reception ==
Professional ratings
Review scores
Source	Rating
AllMusic	4.5/5 stars
The Penguin Guide to Jazz Recordings	4/4 stars

The AllMusic review awarded the album 4½ stars.

The Penguin Guide to Jazz Recordings selected the album as part of its suggested “core collection” of essential recordings.

== Track listing ==
Disc one: The Sweet Time Suite
No.	Title	Length
1.	"Part I – Opening"	2:19
2.	"Part II – For H." "Part III – For Jan"	10:09
3.	"Part IV – For P. A."	9:26
4.	"Part V – Know Where You Are"	5:36
5.	"Part VI – Consolation"	9:19
6.	"Part VII – Freddy C" "Part VIII – Closing"	12:53

Disc two
No.	Title	Length
1.	"Sophie"	8:50
2.	"Sea Lady"	8:33
3.	"Gentle Piece"	8:50
4.	"Trio"	4:00
5.	"Duet I"	2:40
6.	"Duet II"	2:23
7.	"Duet III"	3:04
8.	"Trio"	5:44
9.	"By Myself"	10:32

== Personnel ==
=== Large ensembles (The Sweet Time Suite, "Sophie", "Sea Lady" & "Gentle Piece") ===
- Kenny Wheeler – trumpet, flugelhorn
- Norma Winstone – vocals
- Evan Parker – soprano & tenor saxophone
- Ray Warleigh – alto saxophone
- Stan Sulzmann – tenor saxophone, flute
- Duncan Lamont – tenor saxophone
- Julian Argüelles – baritone saxophone
- Derek Watkins, Henry Lowther, Alan Downey, Ian Hamer – trumpets
- David Horler, Chris Pyne, Paul Rutherford, Hugh Fraser – trombones
- John Taylor – piano
- John Abercrombie – guitar
- Dave Holland – double bass
- Peter Erskine – drums

=== Small ensembles ===
- Kenny Wheeler – flugelhorn (Trios, "By Myself")
- John Abercrombie – guitar ("By Myself")
- John Taylor – piano (Duets)
- Dave Holland – double bass (Trios, "By Myself")
- Peter Erskine – drums

=== Technical personnel ===
- Manfred Eicher – producer
- Jan Erik Kongshaug – engineer
- Barbara Wojirsch – cover design
- Caroline Forbes – photography
- Steve Lake – English liner notes
