= Ambleside Days =

Studio album by John Taylor and John Surman
- Released: 1992
- Recorded: July 15, 1992
- Studio: Rainbow Studios, Oslo
- Genre: Jazz
- Length: 45:57
- Label: Ah Um Records ah um 013
- Producer: Nick Purnell

Professional ratings
Review scores
Source	Rating
Allmusic	4/5 stars

Ambleside Days is an album by jazz pianist John Taylor and John Surman, recorded and released in 1992 on Ah Um Records. Ambleside is a town in Cumbria, North West England. The album has been long out of print.

== Track listing ==
1. "Lodore Falls" - 5:40
2. "Wandering" - 5:05
3. "Ambleside Days" - 10:53
4. "Scale Force" - 4:21
5. "Coniston Fells" - 5:48
6. "Pathway" - 2:26
7. "Clapperclowe" - 5:05
8. "Dry Stone" - 6:39

== Personnel ==
- John Taylor - piano
- John Surman - soprano and baritone saxophone, alto and bass clarinet
