= Around 6 =

Studio album by Kenny Wheeler
- Released: 1980
- Recorded: August 1979
- Studios: Studio Bauer; Ludwigsburg, West Germany
- Genre: Jazz
- Length: 46:43
- Labels: ECM; ECM 1156
- Producer: Manfred Eicher

Kenny Wheeler chronology
Deer Wan (1977)	Around 6 (1980)	Double, Double You (1983)

Around 6 is an album by trumpeter Kenny Wheeler recorded in August 1979 and released on ECM the following year. The sextet features saxophonist Evan Parker, trombonist Eje Thelin, Tom van der Geld on vibraharp, and rhythm section Jean-Francois Jenny-Clark and Edward Vesala.

== Reception ==
The AllMusic review by Scott Yanow awarded the album 4 stars, stating, "the sextet performs six Wheeler originals that combine together advanced swinging with fairly free explorations. Stimulating music."

Professional ratings
Review scores
Source	Rating
AllMusic	4/5 stars

== Track listing ==
All compositions by Kenny Wheeler.

1. "Mai We Go Round" - 10:36
2. "Solo One" - 3:40
3. "May Ride" - 7:25
4. "Follow Down" - 11:48
5. "Riverrun" - 7:44
6. "Lost Woltz" - 5:30

== Personnel ==
- Kenny Wheeler – trumpet, flugelhorn
- Evan Parker – soprano saxophone, tenor saxophone
- Eje Thelin – trombone
- Tom van der Geld – vibraharp
- Jean-Francois Jenny-Clark – bass
- Edward Vesala – drums
