= Where Do We Go from Here? (Kenny Wheeler & John Taylor album) =

Studio album by Kenny Wheeler & John Taylor
- Released: June 8, 2004
- Recorded: February 17 & 19, 2004
- Studios: Artesuono Recording Studio, Cavalicco, Udine, Italy
- Genre: Jazz
- Length: 64:48
- Labels: CAM Jazz; CAMJ 7764-2
- Producer: Ermanno Basso

Kenny Wheeler chronology
Dream Sequence (2003)	Where Do We Go from Here? (2004)	What Now? (2004)

John Taylor chronology
Rosslyn (2003)	Where Do We Go from Here? (2004)	Nightfall (2004)

Where Do We Go from Here? is an album of duets by flugelhornist Kenny Wheeler with pianist John Taylor recorded in 2004 and released on the CAM Jazz label.

== Reception ==
Professional ratings
Review scores
Source	Rating
AllMusic	4/5 stars
All About Jazz	4.5/5 stars
The Guardian	4/5 stars
The Penguin Guide to Jazz Recordings	3.5/4 stars

The AllMusic review by Scott Yanow states "Wheeler and Taylor often echo each other's thoughts and, although much of the music is melancholy and ballad-oriented, it never gets sleepy or overly predictable. The two musicians operate as equals and consistently uncover quiet beauty in these pieces. This outing is well worth exploring by those who are patient and listen closely".

On All About Jazz, John Kelman noted, "What makes Where Do We Go From Here? such an outstanding recording is the remarkable empathy between Wheeler and Taylor. Years of performing together will typically build a good chemistry between capable players, but Wheeler and Taylor go beyond mere comfort into a level of telepathy that finds them completely attuned to each other. The two are so much a part of each other's playing that the smallest nuance, the tiniest phrase from one can spark a response from the other that moves things in another unexpected direction. Yet their responses to each other are so subtle, so graceful, that these unpredictable shifts feel completely natural, smooth and seamless".

The Guardian's John Fordham noted, "Wheeler balances idiosyncratic melodic journeys with shrewdly placed accents and his trademark falsetto squeal on the only imported piece (Summer Night), with Taylor first patrolling supportively around him, then launching into a solo flood of time-changes, percussive sounds, classical rhapsodies and ambiguous chords".

In JazzTimes, David R. Adler wrote, "Recorded in Italy, the album doesn't do full sonic justice to these masters. The signal distorts in places (particularly on some of Wheeler's entrances), which is a problem with music this naked and unadorned. That said, the two display a rare chemistry on seven Wheeler originals, two Taylor pieces and an opening run-through of Dubin and Warren's 'Summer Night'".

== Track listing ==
All compositions by Kenny Wheeler except where noted.

1. "Summer Night" (Harry Warren, Al Dubin) – 6:20
2. "For Tracy" – 5:03
3. "Ma Bel" – 5:01
4. "Au Contraire" (John Taylor) – 4:31
5. "Canter N. 1" – 5:25
6. "Squiggles" – 5:56
7. "One Two Three" – 6:44
8. "Where Do We Go from Here?" – 5:12
9. "Dance" (Taylor) – 3:38
10. "Fordor" – 6:20

== Personnel ==
- Kenny Wheeler – trumpet, flugelhorn
- John Taylor – piano
