= Deer Wan =

Studio album by Kenny Wheeler
- Released: 1978
- Recorded: July 1977
- Studio: Talent Studio; Oslo, Norway
- Genre: Jazz
- Length: 43:46
- Label: ECM 1102 ST
- Producer: Manfred Eicher

Kenny Wheeler chronology
Ensemble Fusionaire (1976)	Deer Wan (1978)	Around 6 (1980)

Professional ratings
Review scores
Source	Rating
AllMusic	4.5/5 stars
The Penguin Guide to Jazz Recordings	4/4 stars

Deer Wan is an album by Kenny Wheeler recorded in July 1977 and released on ECM the following year. The lineup features saxophonist Jan Garbarek, guitarist John Abercrombie, bassist Dave Holland and drummer Jack DeJohnette, with guitarist Ralph Towner appearing on one track.

== Reception ==
The AllMusic review by Scott Yanow states "Kenny Wheeler's beautiful sound on trumpet and his wide range are well-displayed on his four compositions, three of which are given performances over ten minutes long... Wheeler emphasizes lyricism and romantic moods on this fine set of original music."

== Track listing ==
All tracks are written by Kenny Wheeler

Side I
No.	Title	Length
1.	"Peace for Five"	16:27
2.	"3/4 in the Afternoon"	5:50
Total length:		22:17

Side II
No.	Title	Length
1.	"Sumother Song"	11:25
2.	"Deer Wan"	10:04
Total length:		21:29 43:46

== Personnel ==
- Kenny Wheeler – trumpet, flugelhorn
- Jan Garbarek – tenor saxophone, soprano saxophone
- John Abercrombie – electric guitar, electric mandolin
- Dave Holland – bass
- Jack DeJohnette – drums
- Ralph Towner – 12-string guitar (track 2)
