= How It Was Then... Never Again =

1995 studio album by Azimuth

Studio album by Azimuth
- Released: 1995
- Recorded: April 1994
- Studio: Rainbow Studio; Oslo, Norway
- Genre: Jazz
- Length: 44:53
- Label: ECM; ECM 1538
- Producer: Manfred Eicher

Azimuth chronology
Azimuth '85 (1985)	How It Was Then... Never Again (1995)

How It Was Then... Never Again is an album by British jazz trio Azimuth, consisting pianist John Taylor, vocalist Norma Winstone and trumpeter Kenny Wheeler, recorded in April 1994 and released on ECM the following year.

== Reception ==
Professional ratings
Review scores
Source	Rating
AllMusic	3/5 stars
The Penguin Guide to Jazz	3.5/4 stars
The Virgin Encyclopedia of Jazz	4/5 stars

Writing for Jazz Times, Jim Ferguson stated that the group's music, "earthy yet ethereal, minimalist yet often complex—is as inventive as their instrumentation is unique." He commented: "Sublimely artful but hardly qualifying as jazz in the conventional sense, Azimuth's music is beyond categorization."

In a review for AllMusic, Scott Yanow wrote: "Taylor sometimes recalls Keith Jarrett, while Wheeler comes across as the most conventional of the three participants, and Winstone's voice keeps the music from getting too comfortable or predictable. Interesting but not essential music from three adventurous spirits."

The authors of the Penguin Guide to Jazz Recordings commented: "the music... is as progressive and empirical as anything the group has done in 20 years... Winstone's voice is as pure and reed-like as ever."

Between Sound and Space's Tyran Grillo stated: "How it was then... is a genealogy of emotions and places, a tale of winter blooms that hook their stamen onto errant sunrays and uproot themselves into weightless life. Though not as essential as earlier work, it waits all the same with bated breath and open arms."

== Track listing ==
1. "How It Was Then" (Wheeler, Winstone) – 7:45
2. "Looking On" (Taylor, Winstone) – 5:33
3. "Whirlpool" (Taylor) – 4:18
4. "Full Circle" (Taylor) – 8:04
5. "How Deep Is the Ocean" (Irving Berlin) – 3:27
6. "Stango" (Taylor) – 4:14
7. "Mindiatyr" (Bobo Stenson) – 6:02
8. "Wintersweet" (Wheeler, Winstone) – 5:30

== Personnel ==
=== Azimuth ===
- Norma Winstone – vocals
- John Taylor – piano
- Kenny Wheeler – trumpet, flugelhorn
