= Kit Downes =

British musician

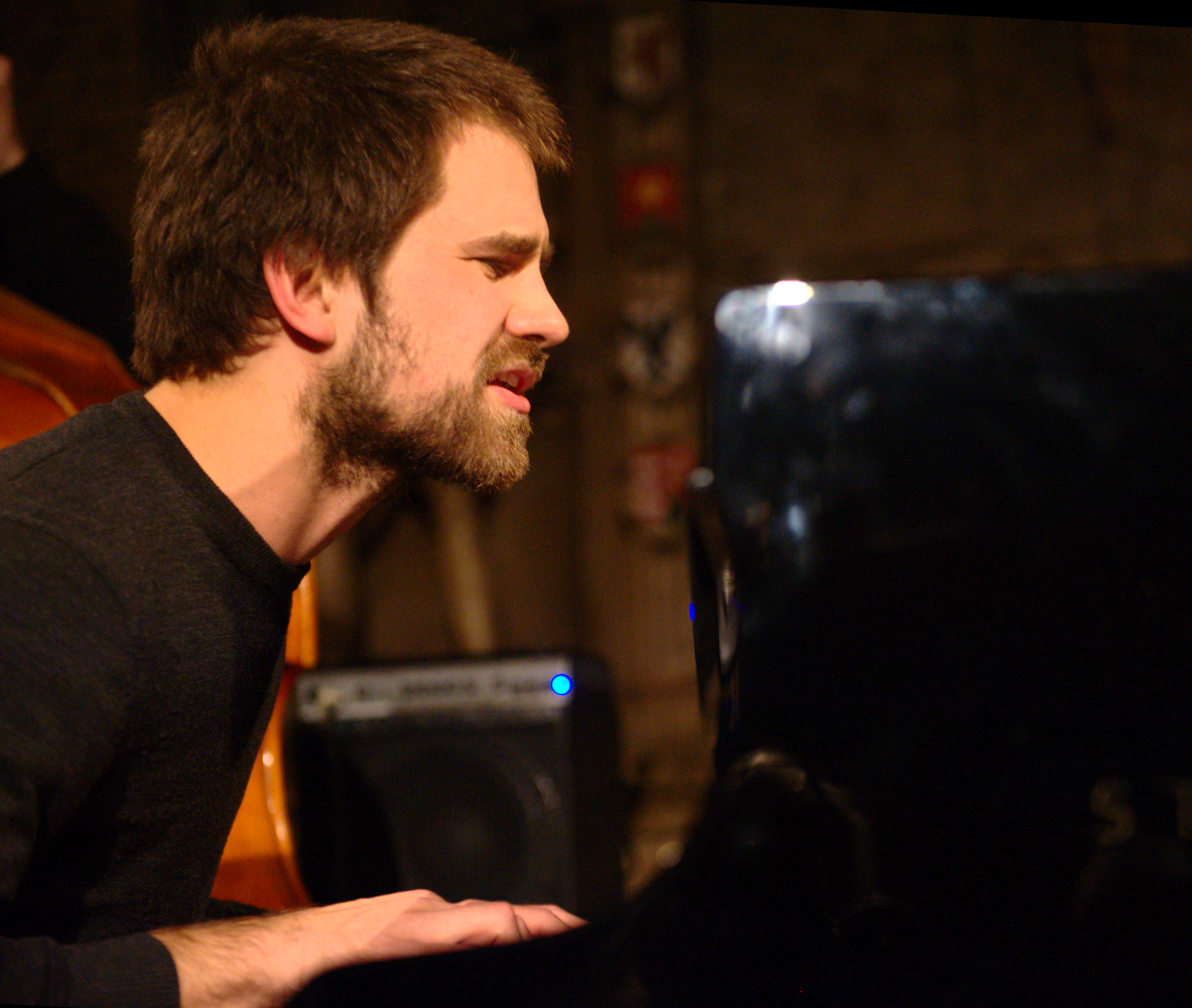
Kit Downes

Kit Downes is a British BBC Jazz Award winning, Mercury Music Award nominated, solo recording artist for ECM Records.

He has toured the world playing piano, church organ and harmonium with his own bands ('ENEMY', 'Troyka', 'Elt' and 'Vyamanikal') as well as artists such as Squarepusher, Thomas Strønen and Django Bates. He has written commissions for Cheltenham Music Festival, London Contemporary Orchestra, Stavanger Konserthus, Rewire Festival, Cologne Philharmonie, BBC Radio 3 and the Wellcome Trust, as well as collaborating with film-makers, video game developers and classical composers.

Downes performs solo pipe organ and solo piano. He also plays in collaborations with saxophonist Tom Challenger, cellist Lucy Railton, composer Shiva Feshareki and with the band 'ENEMY'. He is also currently working with fiddle-player Aidan O'Rourke, composer Max de Wardener, Berlin-based jazz avant-gardist Oliver Steidle's 'Killing Popes' and with singer/photographer Paula Rae Gibson. He teaches piano and composition at the Royal Academy of Music where in 2019 he was awarded a Fellowship. He used to teach at the Purcell School of Music and is also a patron of the ‘Musical Keys’ charity.

== Biography ==
Downes was an organ scholar at St Peter Mancroft in Norwich, before he left to study piano, organ and composition at the Purcell School of Music and later the Royal Academy of Music (where he later became an Associate and Fellow). Whilst at the RAM he studied with Milton Mermikides. He began performing with and composing for the UK band 'Empirical' – with whom he toured North America and Europe (playing at 'Newport Jazz Festival'), whilst also performing with Acoustic Ladyland, Micachu, Lee Konitz and Django Bates.

He received a Mercury Music Award nomination (in 2010), BBC Jazz Award, and a British Jazz Award for his own albums, and later toured with his own group ‘ENEMY’, Troyka, Julian Arguelles' Quartet, Thomas Stronen and Sylvain Darrifourcq – playing all over the world. In 2013 and 2015 he was nominated in the Rising Star category in Downbeat Magazine (US), and in 2014 won the 'Best Album Award' at the Parliamentary Jazz Awards. In 2015, Downes recorded his first album for ECM with Thomas Strønen's ‘Time is a Blind Guide’.

In 2013, he was asked by Django Bates to join his new ensemble ’The TDEs’ to play a new commission for both BBC Radio 3 and Cheltenham Jazz Festival (alongside his Troyka band mates). In 2014 he began touring with world famous clinic drummer Benny Greb – after playing the Meinl Drum Festival and he later went onto co-produce Benny's album ‘Moving Parts’. Also in 2014 he was asked by the Southbank Centre to write a new work for the opening festival of the recently refurbished Royal Festival Hall Organ.

In 2015, he worked with Aldeburgh Music and Tom Challenger on a project called ‘Vyamanikal’ – a series of recordings documenting extended techniques on various local church organs – the project was later performed live at the Aldeburgh Festival. He was asked by the Cologne Philharmonie to write a new work for their organ in 2016, and has performed original commissions by Shiva Feshareki for the Union Chapel Organ. He was also commissioned by the National Youth Jazz Orchestra, the Wellcome Trust, Darmstadt Organ Festival 2015 (with drummer Jonas Burgwinkel), BBC Radio 2, BBC Jazz on 3, Jazzwise Magazine, Cheltenham Jazz Festival, London Contemporary Music Festival and the London Jazz Festival.

Also in 2015, Downes was asked to join Squarepusher’s live band ‘Shobaleader One’ – interpreting works from Squarepusher's back catalogue for a live band. Downes also collaborated (on a range of acoustic and electronic instruments) with composers Matt Rogers and Mica Levi, electronic musician Leafcutter John, drummer Seb Rochford, filmmaker Ashley Pegg, artist Dave McKean, animator Lesley Barnes and geneticist Adam Rutherford (for the Wellcome Trust).

In 2016, Downes was commissioned to compose a work for organ and four cellos for ‘Tre Voci’ to be performed in Oslo in 2016, as well as a new work for ‘Stavanger Organ Day 2016’. He later adapted ‘Vyamanikal’ for Manchester Jazz Festival 2016 and co-curated a music technology installation at Cheltenham Jazz Festival 2016.

52 Studies for Right Hand Downes wrote 52 piano pieces for right-hand only in 2017 (having injured his left hand). He wrote one piece for every day of his recovery.

Between November 2017 and March 2018, Downes was part of the musical ensemble that composed music and appeared on stage for the Royal National Theatre's production of 'Network' starring Bryan Cranston.

In January 2018, Downes released his first solo record with ECM. 'Obsidian' is a collection of solo organ works and is a musical response to volcanicity, slow processes that cause extreme reactions. A mixture of written and semi-scored/semi-improvised pieces, it focuses on the nuances and unique features of both smaller chamber organs local to rural Suffolk as well as larger grander instruments from bigger cities around the UK. It is both a study of extended techniques from instruments sometimes in states of disrepair, and a connection and adaptation of the improvised tradition of the instrument, exploring themes of duration, vibration and mechanics.

Also in 2018, Downes worked with Aidan O'Rourke on his latest project – the mammoth tune-cycle '365'. O'Rourke wrote a tune every day for a year in response to a short story collection by James Robertson. The result is a major new body of 365 tunes which O'Rourke is recording solo and in duos with Downes, guitarist Sorren Maclean and harpist Esther Swift. 365: Vol 1 was released in May 2018. 365: Volume 2 was released in August 2019.

== Awards ==
- Winner of BBC Jazz Award 2008: Rising Star
- Yamaha Jazz Scholarship Award 2009
- Mercury Prize 2010 – shortlisted
- Fellow of Royal Academy of Music 2019
- Downbeat Critics Award 2019 – Rising Star – Organ & Rising Star – Keyboard
- Downbeat Critics Award 2023 – Rising Star – Organ

== Discography ==
An asterisk (*) after the year indicates that it is the year of release.

=== As leader/co-leader ===
Year recorded	Title	Label	Notes
2008–09	Troyka	Edition	As Troyka. Trio, with Chris Montague (guitar), Joshua Blackmore (drums)
2009*	Homely	Impure	Duo, with Tom Cawley (piano)
2009*	Golden	Basho	Trio, with Calum Gourlay (bass), James Maddren (drums)
2010	Catch Me	Edition	As Neon Quartet. Quartet, with Stan Sulzmann (sax), Jim Hart (vibes, marimba), Tim Giles (drums)
2011*	Quiet Tiger	Basho	Most tracks trio, with Calum Gourlay (bass), James Maddren (drums); some tracks quintet, with Adrien Dennefeld (cello), James Allsopp (tenor sax, bass clarinet) added
2012*	Subjekt	Edition	As Neon Quartet. Quartet, with Stan Sulzmann (sax), Jim Hart (vibes), Tim Giles (drums)
2012*	Moxxy	Edition	As Troyka. Trio, with Chris Montague (guitar), Joshua Blackmore (drums)
2013*	Light from Old Stars	Basho	Quintet, with James Allsopp (clarinet, bass clarinet, tenor sax), Lucy Railton (cello), Calum Gourlay (bass), James Maddren (drums)
2013*	Wedding Music	Loop	Duo, with Tom Challenger (tenor sax)
2013*	Little Moon Man		Solo piano. Credited to Chris Hyson as composer. Released as digital EP
2013	Alive with Closed Eyes		Solo piano. Credited to Chris Hyson as composer. Released as digital EP
2013	Live at the 2013 Cheltenham Jazz Festival	Impossible Ark	As Troykestra. Orchestra. With Chris Montague (guitar), Joshua Blackmore (drums), Reuben Fowler (trumpet), Alex Bonney (trumpet), Noel Langley (trumpet), Imogen Hancock (trumpet), Kieran Stickle McLeod (trombone), Patrick Hayes (trombone), Tom Green (trombone), Courtney Brown Bass (trombone), Mike Chillingworth (alto sax), Nadim Teimoori (alto sax), Sam Miles (tenor sax), James Allsop (tenor sax), Sam Rapley (bass clarinet, baritone sax), Louis Van Der Westhuizen (bass), Ralph Hero Wyld (vibes); in concert
2015*	Ornithophobia	Naim	As Troyka. Trio, with Chris Montague (guitar), Joshua Blackmore (drums)
2015	Vyamanikal	Slip	Duo, with Tom Challenger (sax)
2018*	Obsidian	ECM	Most tracks solo church organ; one track duo, with Tom Challenger (tenor sax)
2018*	Enemy	Edition	As Enemy. Trio, with Frans Petter Eldh (bass), James Maddren (drums)
2018*	Emotion Machine	Slowfoot (vinyl only)	Duo, with Paula Rae Gibson
2019*	Dreamlife Of Debris	ECM	Quintet, with Tom Challenger, Lucy Railton, Sebastian Rochford, Stian Westerhus
2021*	Subaerial	SN Variations	Duo, co-led with Lucy Railton
2022*	Vermillion	ECM	Trio, with Frans Petter Eldh, James Maddren
2022*	Multi-Directional	Raw Tonk	Trio, with Andrew Lisl, John Edwards
2022*	Deadeye	Dox	As Deadeye. With Reinier Baas (guitar), Jonas Burgwinkel (drums)
2022	Breaking the Shell	Red Hook	Most tracks trio, co-led with Bill Frisell (guitar), Andrew Cyrille (drums); one track quartet, with Lucy Railton (cello) added
2024	Outpost of Dreams	ECM	Collaborative album with Norma Winstone

=== As sideman ===
Year recorded	Band/Leader	Title	Label	Notes
2007*	Empirical	Empirical	Destin-E	Quintet. With Nathaniel Facey (alto sax), Jay Phelps (trumpet), Neil Charles (bass), Shaney Forbes (drums)
2009*	Clark Tracey	Current Climate	Tentoten	Sextet. With Paul Jordanous (trumpet), Pieres Green (sax), Lewis Wright (vibes), Ryan Trebilcock (bass)
2009*	The Golden Age of Steam	Raspberry Tongue	Babel	Trio. With James Allsopp (reeds), Tim Giles (drums)
2011*	Threads Orchestra	Threads		Orchestra. With Adam Robinson (viola), Julian Gregory (violin), Semay Wu (cello), Chris Montague (guitar), Dai Pritchard (soprano sax), Ralph Wyld (vibes), Rus Pearson (bass), Joost Hendrickx (drums)
2012*	George Crowley	Paper Universe	Whirlwind	Quartet. With Calum Gourlay (bass), James Maddren (drums)
2012*	The Golden Age of Steam	Welcome to Bat Country	Basho	Trio. With James Allsopp (reeds), Tim Giles (drums). Some tracks quartet, quintet, sextet, with Alex Bonney (trumpet), James Widden (violin, viola), Alison Holford (cello), Ruth Goller (electric bass)
2013*	Nostalgia 77	Journey Too Far	Tru Thoughts	
2015	Thomas Strønen	Time Is a Blind Guide	ECM	
2017	Jeff Williams	Lifelike	Whirlwind	Sextet, with Gonçalo Marquez (trumpet), John O'Gallagher (alto sax), Josh Arcoleo (tenor sax), Sam Lasserson (bass)
2022	Lucia Cadotsch	Aki	Heartcore	Most tracks quartet, with Phil Donkin (bass), James Maddren (drums); some tracks quintet, with Kurt Rosenwinkel (guitar) added
