= All the More =

Studio album by Kenny Wheeler
- Released: 1997
- Recorded: October 31 and November 1, 1993
- Studios: Mu Rec Studio, Milano, Italy
- Genre: Jazz
- Length: 63:01
- Labels: Soul Note; 121236-2

Kenny Wheeler chronology
Kayak (1992)	All the More (1997)	Angel Song (1997)

All the More is an album by flugelhornist and composer Kenny Wheeler recorded in 1993 but was not released on the Italian Soul Note label until 1997.

== Reception ==
Professional ratings
Review scores
Source	Rating
AllMusic	4/5 stars

The AllMusic review by Scott Yanow called it "an excellent showcase for trumpeter Kenny Wheeler" and states "Wheeler can sound so peaceful and wistful that it is always a surprise when he displays his wide range and hits some impressive high notes, as he does in spots throughout the set. His originals are complex yet friendly, unpredictable but logical, always seeming to develop gradually until their conclusion. He is also very democratic in allocating solo space. Well worth picking up".

On All About Jazz, Robert Spencer noted "Kenny Wheeler's gorgeous trumpet anchors these tracks, but also attracting attention here is the understated beauty and subtle adventurousness of John Taylor's piano. With that kind of combination in his playing, Taylor is a perfect match for Wheeler, who has straddled a few divides in his time. Much of this disc features the ethereal ECM-ish music Wheeler has made his trademark, but some of it harks back to Wheeler's earlier days as a pillar of the English "free music" scene".

== Track listing ==
All compositions by Kenny Wheeler except where noted.

1. "Phrase One" – 6:33
2. "All the More" – 6:00
3. "Mark Time" – 10:14
4. "Introduction to No Particular Song" – 6:53
5. "The Imminent Immigrant" – 9:36
6. "Nonetheless" (Joe La Barbera) – 6:04
7. "Kind of Bill" – 8:24
8. "Summer Night" (Harry Warren, Al Dubin) – 9:17

== Personnel ==
- Kenny Wheeler – trumpet, flugelhorn
- John Taylor – piano
- Furio Di Castri – bass
- Joe LaBarbera – drums
