= Moon (Kenny Wheeler and John Taylor album) =

Studio album by Kenny Wheeler, John Taylor
- Released: 2001
- Recorded: February 2001; Teatro Comunale di Gubbio, Gubbio
- Genre: Jazz
- Length: 50:35
- Label: Egea Records; SCA 086

Moon is a studio album by Canadian musician Kenny Wheeler and British pianist John Taylor, recorded in 2001 and released on Egea Records. The album also features clarinetist Gabriele Mirabassi on some tracks.

== Reception ==
Professional ratings
Review scores
Source	Rating
The Penguin Guide to Jazz	3/4 stars

The authors of The Penguin Guide to Jazz awarded the album 3 stars, commenting: "many beautiful moments for this long-standing partnership". In a review for All About Jazz, Enzo Vizzone wrote: "Wheeler and Taylor have produced some great music together in the past, but seldom as irresistibly gorgeous as this... The material, six originals by Wheeler, three by Taylor, allow free rein to their imagination and the results are sublime, their beauty enhanced by the sensitively detailed recording".

== Track listing ==
All compositions by Kenny Wheeler unless otherwise noted.

1. "After the Last Time" (John Taylor) - 4:23
2. "Flo" - 4:59
3. "Ambleside" (Taylor) - 6:03
4. "Introduction to No Particular Song" - 7:07
5. "Moon" (Taylor) - 4:46
6. "Sly Eyes" - 7:53
7. "3/4 P.M." - 5:36
8. "Derivation" - 5:55
9. "Medium 30" - 3:53

== Personnel ==
- Kenny Wheeler - flugelhorn
- John Taylor - piano
- Gabriele Mirabassi - clarinet
