= Windmill Tilter =

Studio album by Kenny Wheeler and the John Dankworth Orchestra
- Released: 1969
- Recorded: March 1968
- Genre: Jazz, big band
- Length: 41:20
- Label: Fontana

Kenny Wheeler chronology
Windmill Tilter (1969)	Song for Someone (1973)

Windmill Tilter: The Story of Don Quixote is an album by trumpeter Kenny Wheeler, his first as a leader. It was recorded in March 1968 and was released in 1969 by Fontana Records. On the album, Wheeler, credited as "Ken Wheeler," is joined by the John Dankworth Orchestra. In 2010, the album was reissued by BGO Records in remastered form. In 2021 it was reissued on vinyl as part of Decca's British Jazz Explosion series, remastered and re-cut from the original master tapes by Gearbox Records.

Windmill Tilter came about when Wheeler was unable to play for several months due to dental issues, and Dankworth, with whom Wheeler had toured, suggested that he put together material for an album. The recording, which was inspired by Miguel de Cervantes' Don Quixote, was John McLaughlin's last session before his departure for the United States, and was Dave Holland's first recording.

== Reception ==
Professional ratings
Review scores
Source	Rating
AllMusic	4/5 stars
All About Jazz	5/5 stars
Jazzwise	4/5 stars
Jazz Journal	4/5 stars
The Virgin Encyclopedia of Jazz	4/5 stars

In a review for All About Jazz, John Kelman wrote that the album was "long considered a holy grail of British jazz," and stated: "Singer Norma Winstone once called Wheeler 'the Duke Ellington of our times.' It's hard to dispute the importance of a writer/trumpeter who, as early as this 1968 date, was well on his way to supporting his future collaborator's well-deserved accolade." AAJ's Jack Kenny commented: "For those familiar with Wheeler's subsequent work, there are few surprises here. Those new to his work will find Windmill Tilter a good starting point. Wheeler is a unique voice as both a player and a composer."

John Fordham, writing for Jazzwise, called the recording "a classic album," and commented: "All Wheeler's signature compositional characteristics are already here... Windmill Tilter still sounds like the arrival of the contemporary-jazz gamechanger it was, and this Dankworth band was a world-class outfit."

Jazz Journal's Derek Ansell noted that the album "never sounds like the brooding Gil Evans orchestra of those times but reminds us of it in the instrumentation and the uses made of it," and remarked: "Thoughtfully crafted flugelhorn outings and solos by McLaughlin, Dankworth and Tony Coe all combine to make this a fascinating exercise in modern big-band jazz of the late 1960s."

Writing for Critics At Large, John Corcelli stated: "Wheeler has created a conceptual shape to jazz music that was rarely given a voice in 1968. Fortunately, John Dankworth recognized Wheeler’s talent and gave him a chance. The result is one fine recording: music that swings and tells a story."

== Track list ==
All tracks are written by Kenny Wheeler.

Side one
No.	Title	Length
1.	"Preamble"	0:43
2.	"Don the Dreamer"	6:14
3.	"Sweet Dulcinea Blue"	3:40
4.	"Bachelor Sam"	5:18
5.	"Sancho"	4:47

Side two
No.	Title	Length
1.	"The Cane of Montesinos"	4:43
2.	"Propheticape"	2:26
3.	"Altisidora"	5:22
4.	"Don No More"	8:12

== Personnel ==
- Kenny Wheeler – flugelhorn

=== John Dankworth Orchestra ===
- John Dankworth – leader, saxophone, liner notes
- Ray Swinfield, Tony Robert, Tony Coe – saxophones
- Derek Watkins, Henry Shaw, Henry Lowther, Les Condon – trumpets
- Chris Pyne, Mike Gibbs – trombones
- Alf Reece, Dick Hart – tubas
- John McLaughlin – guitar
- Alan Branscombe, Bob Cornford – pianos
- Dave Holland – double bass
- John Spooner – drums
- Tristan Fry – percussion
