= Song for Someone (album) =

1973 studio album by Kenny Wheeler

Studio album by Kenny Wheeler
- Released: 1973
- Recorded: January 10–11, 1973
- Studio: Olympic Sound Studios, Barnes, London
- Genre: Jazz
- Length: 38:02
- Label: Incus 10
- Producer: Bob Cornford

Kenny Wheeler chronology
| Windmill Tilter (1969) | Song for Someone (1973) | Gnu High (1975) |

Song for Someone is the second album led by trumpeter and composer Kenny Wheeler which was recorded in 1973 and released on the Incus label. The album was rereleased on CD on Psi Records in 2004.

== Reception ==
Professional ratings
Review scores
| Source | Rating |
|---|---|
| Allmusic | 4/5 stars |
| Uncut | 5/5 stars |

The Allmusic review by Steve Loewy noted "This recording has a split personality: much of it comes from a solid, 1970s jazz big band perspective, with occasional emblems of the era (such as electric piano), and consistently solid solos, especially from the leader, trumpeter Kenny Wheeler... often known for his work in ensembles in which free improvisation is the unifying factor... Some might find it disconcerting that two seemingly disparate styles are juxtaposed together. Others will see it as evidencing the breadth of the music". Uncut's review of the 2004 reissue called it "one of the great British orchestral jazz records".

== Track listing ==
All compositions by Kenny Wheeler.

1. "Toot-Toot"- 4:14
2. "Ballad Two" - 8:26
3. "Song for Someone" - 2:40
4. "Causes are Events" - 8:15
5. "The Good Doctor" - 15:15
6. "Nothing Changes" (lyrics by Norma Winstone) - 4:23

== Personnel ==
- Kenny Wheeler - trumpet, flugelhorn
- Greg Bowen, Ian Hamer, Dave Hancock - trumpet
- Keith Christie, David Horler, Bobby Lamb, Chris Pyne - trombone
- Malcolm Griffiths (track 5), Jim Wilson (tracks 1–4 & 6) - bass trombone
- Alfie Reece - tuba
- Mike Osborne - alto saxophone
- Duncan Lamont - tenor saxophone, flute
- Alan Branscombe - piano, electric piano
- John Taylor - electric piano
- Ron Mathewson - bass
- Tony Oxley - percussion
- Norma Winstone - voice
- Derek Bailey - guitar (track 5)
- Evan Parker - soprano saxophone, tenor saxophone (tracks 4 & 5)
