= Paula Rae Gibson =

English photographer and singer-songwriter

Paula Rae Gibson is an English photographer and singer-songwriter.

== Personal life ==
Paula Rae Gibson is a fine art photographer from London. She has distinctive photographic style and is known for experimental analogue photography and darkroom techniques, including bleaching, staining, tearing and layering prints to give her images a raw, tactile, emotional quality.

"Throughout her vividly creative life, Gibson has openly transformed the strength of her experience into her art. And in so doing, she has fashioned unique expressions of herself, and those she cares for, that nevertheless stir others with their authenticity and instinctual force. " Martin Barnes Senior Curator, Photography Victoria and Albert Museum.

At 35, Paula Rae Gibson was widowed by the renowned English film director Brian Gibson[ Blue Remembered Hills, Breaking Glass, What's Love Got To Do With It ] They have one daughter,Raphaella Gibson.

== Publications ==
=== Photography ===
- Books -Diary of a Love Addict. Kehrer, 2005. Edited by Milan Chlumsky and Gibson. ISBN 3936636761.
- I'll Always Walk Away. Kehrer, 2007. ISBN 978-3939583516.
- You Gather My Darkness Like Snow Watch It Melt. Babel, 2011.
- Rae: a Pictorial Love Song. Eyemazing, 2016. ISBN 978-90-822754-2-1
- Remember When I Told You Everything ,Ephemere publishing Tokyo
- SHOWS
- Ph21 Gallery Budapest, Without You I'm Nothing
- 14th Julia Margaret Cameron Awards winner in Women seen by Women 2023
- Rotterdam Photo Festival 2024
- Fitzrovia Chapel, Be Alive With Me, solo exhibition in conversation with Martin Barnes, senior photo curator of the VIctoria and Albert Museum October 2024
- Mia photo fair BNP , Nearest Dearest, curated by Erik Vessels 2026
- Finalist selection , Rencontres de la Photographie 2026
- Royal Academy Summer Exhibition 2026, You Remind Me, curator : Artist Ryan Gander (RA OBE

== Music Discography ==
- No More Tiptoes (33 Jazz, 2007)
- Maybe Too Nude (Babel, 2008) – with Will Gregory and drummer Martyn Barker
- You Gather My Darkness Like Snow Watch It Melt (Babel, 2009) – with pianist Ivo Neame and Jim Hart
- The Pleasure of Ruin (Babel, 2013) by Rae Forest Project – with Mike Flynn, Sophie Alloway and Tom Pilling
- Emotion Machine (Slowfoot, 2019) – with Kit Downes
- The Roles We Play to Disappear (Octoberhouse, 2022) – with Alex Bonney ,Kit Downes, Matthew Bourne, Rob Luft, and Jay Villiers.
- I Found You Eating Colours (Unvaeled, 2023) with Matthew Bourne
- Loving in Real Time (Xtreme33)- with Alex Bonney and Matthew Bourne
- In Another World We Will Live Forever (Xtreme33) with Alex Bonney

== Filmography ==
- What Are You Doing Forever? (Wiggy Woo, 2006)

=== Novella ===
- Hanging onto a Thread to Believe in Rare Things. Indigo Dreams, 2012. ISBN 978-1-907401-54-1. A novella on grief.
