= Golden (Kit Downes Trio album) =

Studio album by Kit Downes Trio
- Released: 2009
- Genre: Jazz
- Label: Basho

Golden is the debut album by the acoustic jazz Kit Downes Trio. It was released in 2009 by Basho Records and was shortlisted for the 2010 Mercury Prize.

== Background and music ==
The trio of pianist Kit Downes, bassist Calum Gourlay and drummer James Maddren had been together since 2005, when they were studying at the Royal Academy of Music. This was their first recording together. Seven of the tracks were written by Downes; Gourlay composed "Roots".

== Release and reception ==
Golden was released in 2009 by Basho Records. The AllAboutJazz reviewer concluded that "The quality of writing and performance on this album so soon after the players' graduation demonstrates their huge potential and ensures that the album itself is one of the finest debut recordings of 2009." Critic John Fordham wrote: "Kit Downes, formerly of Empirical, is beginning to get the kind of enthusiastic attention Gwilym Simcock did on his emergence a few years before. [...] Downes is more of a choosy, patient storyteller, and if one of his distinctive original themes only requires a handful of notes and a lot of spaces, he leaves it like that."

The album was shortlisted for the 2010 Mercury Prize.

== Track listing ==
1. "Jump Minzi Jump"
2. "Golden"
3. "Homely"
4. "Power and Patience (the Bear)"
5. "Madame"
6. "A Dance Took Place"
7. "Roots"
8. "Tom's Tune"

== Personnel ==
- Kit Downes – piano
- Calum Gourlay – bass
- James Maddren – drums
