= Outpost of Dreams =

Studio album by Norma Winstone and Kit Downes
- Released: 5 July 2024
- Recorded: April 2023
- Genre: Jazz
- Length: 41:40
- Label: ECM
- Producer: Manfred Eicher

Norma Winstone chronology
The Soundless Dark (2023)	Outpost of Dreams (2024)

Kit Downes chronology
A Short Diary (2023)	Outpost of Dreams (2024)	Breaking the Shell (2024)

Outpost of Dreams is a collaborative studio album by English jazz singer Norma Winstone and pianist Kit Downes. It was released on 5 July 2024, by ECM Records.

== Background ==
The ten-track album was produced by Winstone's long-time collaborator Manfred Eicher, and recorded by Winstone and Downes in April 2023 in Udine, Italy, as their first collaborative album.

== Reception ==
Professional ratings
Review scores
Source	Rating
AllMusic	4/5 stars
All About Jazz	3.5/5 stars
The Guardian	4/5 stars

Outpost of Dreams was described by AllMusic as a "quiet, gentle, even tenderly poetic masterpiece that represents music-making as an organic yet adventurous hub of meaning." All About Jazz's Chris May stated "The urge to decode the songs is, however, hard to resist and will be an enjoyable aspect of what one anticipates to be multiple returns to the album," and rated the album three and a half stars out of five.

French magazine Télérama's Louis-Julien Nicolaou praised Winstone's vocal performance on the album and described it as "an album with refined melodies of clear, scintillating modernity." The Guardian noted it as "an album of exquisite songs and extraordinary empathy," comparing Winstone's cover of the traditional song "Black Is the Colour" to that of Nina Simone.

== Track listing ==
No.	Title	Length
1.	"El"	5:05
2.	"Fly the Wind"	3:11
3.	"Jesus Maria"	4:29
4.	"Beneath an Evening Sky"	3:25
5.	"Out of the Dancing Sea"	3:34
6.	"The Steppe"	5:06
7.	"Nocturne"	5:08
8.	"Black Is the Colour"	4:34
9.	"In Search of Sleep"	3:06
10.	"Rowing Home"	3:57
Total length:		41:40
