= Départ =

Studio album by Azimuth with Ralph Towner
- Released: 1980
- Recorded: December 1979
- Studio: Talent Studios; Oslo, Norway
- Genre: Jazz
- Length: 52:51
- Label: ECM 1163
- Producer: Manfred Eicher

Azimuth chronology
The Touchstone (1979)	Départ (1980)	Azimuth '85 (1985)

Ralph Towner chronology
Old Friends, New Friends (1979)	Départ (1980)	Solo Concert (1980)

Départ is an album by British jazz trio Azimuth with American jazz guitarist Ralph Towner, recorded in December 1979 and released on ECM the following year. The trio features trumpeter Kenny Wheeler, vocalist Norma Winstone and pianist John Taylor, joined by guitarist Ralph Towner.

== Reception ==
Professional ratings
Review scores
Source	Rating
The Penguin Guide to Jazz	3/4 stars

The authors of the Penguin Guide to Jazz Recordings called Towner "an ideal guest," and wrote: "Much as he does on Weather Report's I Sing the Body Electric, Towner sounds as if he comes from outside the basic conception of the group, but with a genuine understanding and appreciation of what it's all about. His contribution is perhaps most emphatic on 'Arrivée'... linking the whole disc into a continuous suite."

Writing for Between Sound and Space, Tyran Grillo described the album as "Azimuth's most fully realized effort, through which the project honed its sound to an art," and noted: "Winstone's overdubs visualize gossamer veils of more distant storms, while Wheeler's soulful trumpet shines like the sun beyond them... The brief addition of Towner heightens their collective sound, even as it tethers them to the earth."

== Track listing ==
All compositions by John Taylor.

1. "The Longest Day" – 6:32
2. "Autumn" – 11:10
3. "Arrivée" – 7:52
4. "Touching Points: a. From the Window" – 1:14
5. "Touching Points: b. Windfall" – 4:37
6. "Touching Points: c. The Rabbit" – 2:36
7. "Touching Points: d. Charcoal Traces" – 4:37
8. "Départ" – 10:29
9. "The Longest Day (Reprise)" – 3:44

== Personnel ==
=== Azimuth ===
- Kenny Wheeler – trumpet, flugelhorn
- Norma Winstone – vocals
- John Taylor – piano, organ

=== Guest ===
- Ralph Towner – 12-string guitar, classical guitar
