= Azimuth '85 =

Studio album by Azimuth
- Released: 1985
- Recorded: March 1985
- Studios: Rainbow Studios; Oslo, Norway
- Genre: Jazz
- Length: 44:19
- Labels: ECM; ECM 1298
- Producer: Manfred Eicher

Azimuth chronology
Départ (1980)	Azimuth '85 (1985)	How It Was Then... Never Again (1994)

Azimuth '85 is the fourth and penultimate album by British jazz trio Azimuth recorded in March 1985 and released on ECM later that year. The trio features pianist John Taylor, vocalist Norma Winstone, and trumpeter Kenny Wheeler.

== Reception ==
Professional ratings
Review scores
Source	Rating
AllMusic	3/5 stars
The Penguin Guide to Jazz	2/4 stars

The AllMusic review by Michael G. Nastos states, "It's an acquired taste, but if you do, you'll not let go."

The Penguin Guide to Jazz Recordings expressed disappointment, calling Azimuth '85 "an unconfident step back", and stating the band "fell into the trap ... of letting a style become a manner".

Tyran Grillo, writing for ECM blog Between Sound and Space, called the album "Azimuth's zenith and another significant chapter of ECM’s backstory," and commented: "Essential for many reasons, not least of all for Taylor, who plays as if he were holding an inanimate body in his hands, tracing its every contour until it comes back to life."

== Track listing ==
All lyrics are written by Norma Winstone; all music is composed by John Taylor, except as noted.

No.	Title	Lyrics	Music	Length
1.	"Adios Iony"			7:00
2.	"Dream/Lost Song"			5:55
3.	"Who Are You?"	Jane White	Kenny Wheeler	3:42
4.	"Breathtaking"			6:25
5.	"Potion 1"			2:17
6.	"February Daze"			6:20
7.	"Til Bakeblikk"			9:04
8.	"Potion 2"			3:36

== Personnel ==
=== Azimuth ===
- John Taylor – piano, organ
- Kenny Wheeler – trumpet, flugelhorn
- Norma Winstone – vocals
