= Frank Sinatra: Live at Aryamehr Stadium =

1975 concert by Frank Sinatra

Frank Sinatra: Live at Aryamehr Stadium was a concert by Frank Sinatra which was held at Aryamehr Stadium in Tehran, Iran on 24 November 1975, with Bill Miller conducting the orchestra. Prior to the concert, Sinatra and his orchestra, mostly composed of American musicians, apart from the British Vic Ash and the Irish Bobby Lamb, played for the Shah and Empress Farah at their palace.

== Bobby Lamb's account ==
"It was strange to see such a different culture going wild and showing so much appreciation for the music, and what we were doing."

—Bobby Lamb

According to Lamb's interview with the Irish Sunday Independent in April 2001, the musicians arrived at the airport after a "fantastic flight". The palace was "the most sumptuous place ever seen", "charming and elegant" with "a small audience".

Aryamehr Stadium was "a huge sports building, with all modern conveniences, seating about 24,000." The "huge stage" was built in the middle for Sinatra to be able to "move around the four sides of the hall."

== Setlist ==
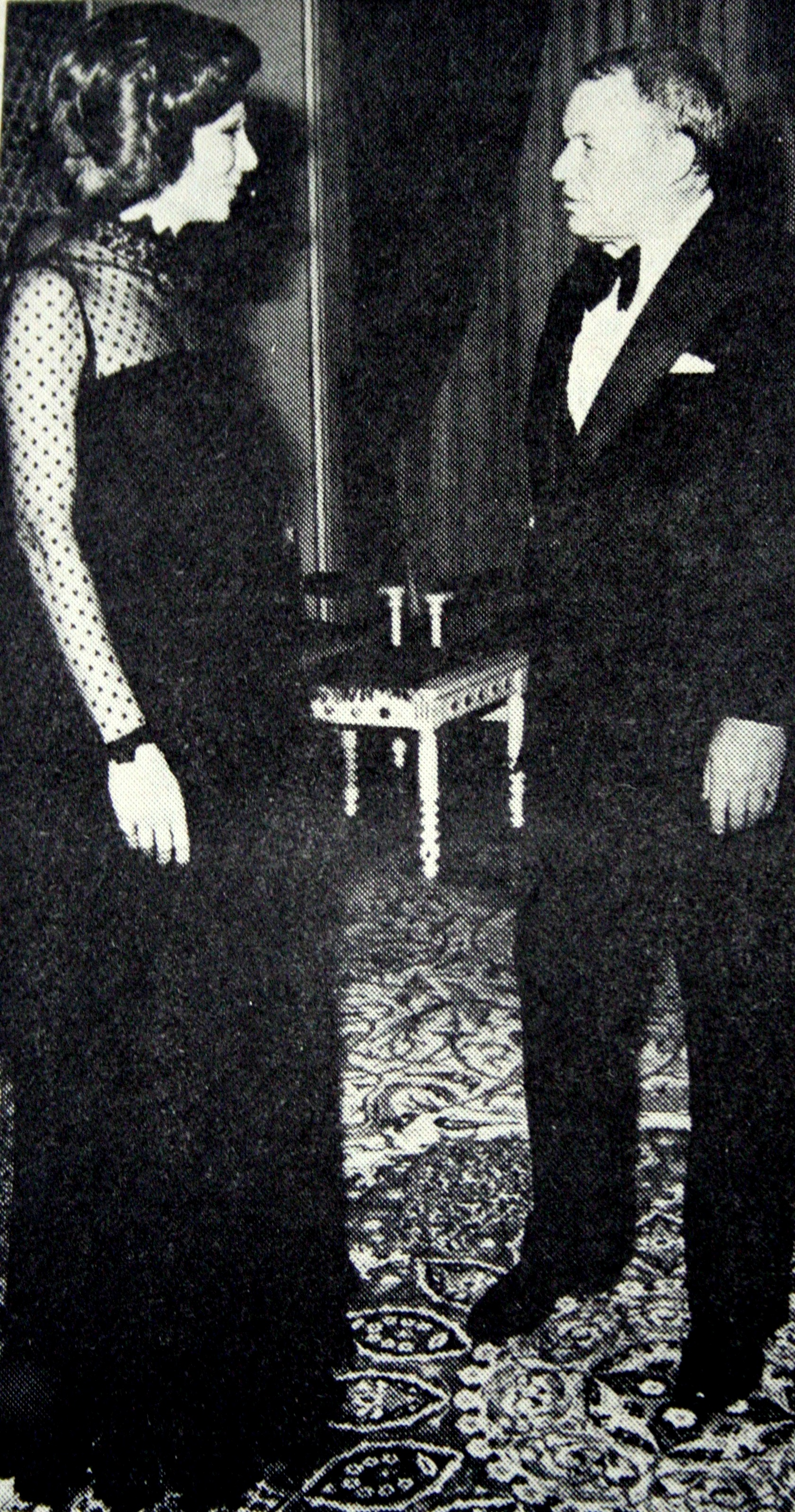
Queen Farah Pahlavi and Frank Sinatra in Tehran in November 1975

The songs that were performed during the concert were:

1. "At Long Last Love"
2. "My Kind of Town"
3. "But Beautiful"
4. "Didn't We"
5. "Something"
6. "They Can't Take That Away From Me"
7. "My Way"
8. "Nancy (with the Laughing Face)"
9. "That's Life"
10. "I've Got You Under My Skin"
11. "Pennies From Heaven"
12. "Fly Me to the Moon"
13. "The Lady Is a Tramp"

== See also ==
- Concerts of Frank Sinatra
