= Flutter By, Butterfly =

Studio album by Kenny Wheeler Quintet
- Released: 1988
- Recorded: May 26 & 27, 1987; Barigozzi Studios, Milano, Italy
- Genre: Jazz
- Length: 48:13
- Label: Soul Note; SN 1146
- Producer: Giovanni Bonandrini

Kenny Wheeler chronology
Double, Double You (1983)	Flutter By, Butterfly (1988)	Visions (1988)

Professional ratings
Review scores
Source	Rating
Allmusic	4/5 stars
The Penguin Guide to Jazz Recordings	3/4 stars

Flutter By, Butterfly is an album by the Kenny Wheeler Quintet recorded in 1987 and released on the Soul Note label.

== Reception ==
The Allmusic review awarded the album 4 stars stating "each of the performances (which feature consistently rewarding solos) are worth hearing".

== Track listing ==
All compositions by Kenny Wheeler

1. "Everybody's Song But My Own" - 9:33
2. "We Salute the Night" - 5:11
3. "Miold Man"' - 9:21
4. "Flutter By, Butterfly" - 8:51
5. "Gigolo" - 8:23
6. "The Little Fella" - 7:13

== Personnel ==
- Kenny Wheeler - flugelhorn, cornet
- Stan Sulzmann - soprano saxophone, tenor saxophone, flute
- John Taylor - piano
- Dave Holland - bass
- Billy Elgart - drums
