= Bobby Lamb (trombonist) =

Irish jazz trombonist, composer, and conductor (born 1931)

- Born: Robert Valentine Lamb; 11 February 1931 (age 95); Cork, Ireland
- Genre: Jazz
- Occupation: Musician
- Instrument: Trombone
- Years active: 1951–2007

Robert Valentine Lamb (born 11 February 1931) is an Irish jazz trombonist, composer, and conductor. A native of Cork, Lamb lived in London for much of his career. In the 1950s, he played trombone for Jack Parnell, Woody Herman, and Geraldo. After playing for the BBC Radio Orchestra for much of the 1960s, Lamb began co-leading an orchestra with Ray Premru and accompanying recording artists such as Frank Sinatra.

Beginning in the 1980s, Lamb taught music at the Trinity College of Music and conducted national level orchestras, including the European Community Youth Orchestra and National Symphony Orchestra of Ireland.

== Early life ==
Born in 1931 in Cork, then in the Irish Free State, Lamb started on euphonium as a teenager before settling on trombone. In 1951, Lamb moved to Dublin to perform with Neil Kearn's band for six months and later Johnny Devlin's Downbeaters group.

== Career ==
In 1952, Lamb moved to London, England, where he played with Teddy Foster. From late-1953 to August 1955, Lamb was a member of Jack Parnell's band. After working with Parnell, Lamb relocated to the U.S., working with Charlie Barnet, Stan Kenton, and Woody Herman. During his three-year stint with Herman, Lamb played in a tour where Herman shared billing with Louis Armstrong's All Stars.

In 1958, Lamb returned to London to join the BBC Show Band with Cyril Stapleton. From 1958 to 1959, Lamb was part of Geraldo's orchestra that regularly performed at the Hippodrome before freelancing with various other theatre orchestras. From 1960 to 1968, Lamb played for the BBC Radio Orchestra.

He and Ray Premru co-led an orchestra starting in the late 1960s, in which they worked with Buddy Rich, Louie Bellson, and Kenny Clare, among others. Lamb made his first recording as a composer in 1970, The Children Of Lir, for which he won an Ivor Novello Award. During the 1970s, Lamb also played in the Top of the Pops orchestra conducted by Johnny Pearson.

He toured with Frank Sinatra on his European tours from the 1970s into the 1980s and the Middle East concerts (Iran and Israel) in 1975. Lamb also toured Europe with Ella Fitzgerald and Peggy Lee. He toured Scandinavia with Buddy Rich late in the 1970s.

Outside of jazz, Lamb wrote several works for orchestra, including an arrangement of Porgy and Bess. He also worked extensively for film and television across Europe. Lamb also conducted orchestras, including the European Community Youth Orchestra, National Symphony Orchestra of Ireland, and NDR Symphony Orchestra of Germany. During his career, Lamb performed in over 6,000 live broadcasts, 200 film soundtracks, and numerous television programmes.

In 1982, Lamb was appointed as director of jazz studies at the Trinity College of Music in London. Lamb became professor of contemporary music studies at Hochschule für Musik Detmold in Germany in 1994. Lamb retired from his position at Trinity in 2007.

== Discography ==
- Trinity Fair (Hep, 1995)

As sideman

- 1957 Live Featuring Bill Harris, Vol. 1, Woody Herman
- 1970 Louie in London, Louie Bellson
- 1970 Movements, Johnny Harris
- 1973 Song for Someone, Kenny Wheeler
- 1986 Eurojazz, European Community Jazz Orchestra
- 1990 Live Featuring Bill Harris, Vol. 2, Woody Herman
- 1996 My Huckleberry Friend, Johnny Mercer
- 1998 Electrician's Hall Miami, Florida, Vol. 2, Woody Herman
- 2004 The Musical Worlds of Laurie Johnson, Laurie Johnson
- 2005 Chitinous, Chitinous Ensemble
- 2005 Moon River, Johnny Mercer
- 2006 Jazz Guitarist Sacha Distel
- 2007 Spiral, Harry Roche Constellation
- 2007 The Little Giant, Tubby Hayes
