= The Touchstone (album) =

Studio album by Azimuth
- Released: 1979
- Recorded: June 1978
- Studio: Talent Studio; Oslo, Norway
- Genre: Jazz
- Length: 45:11
- Label: ECM; ECT 1130 ST
- Producer: Manfred Eicher

Azimuth chronology
Azimuth (1977)	The Touchstone (1979)	Départ (1980)

The Touchstone is the second album by British jazz trio Azimuth, recorded in June 1978 and released on ECM the following year. The trio features trumpeter Kenny Wheeler, vocalist Norma Winstone, and pianist John Taylor.

== Reception ==
Professional ratings
Review scores
Source	Rating
AllMusic	3/5 stars
The Penguin Guide to Jazz	3/4 stars

The AllMusic review by Michael G. Nastos describes The Touchstone as an "atmospheric recording".

The Penguin Guide to Jazz Recordings calls the album "perhaps the group's masterpiece, combining jazz, classical and contemporary composition, and sheer sound in a mix that is as invigorating as it is thought-provoking", singling out "See" as "glorious."

Tyran Grillo, writing for ECM blog Between Sound and Space, called the album "the group’s most enigmatic", commenting: "This is an elusive set... filled with quiet, seething power, but also one that builds its nests comfortably over our heads. It can only fly, because it knows no other way to travel."

== Track listing ==
All tracks are written by John Taylor

Side I
No.	Title	Length
1.	"Eulogy"	10:26
2.	"Silver"	6:30
3.	"Mayday"	5:31

Side II
No.	Title	Length
1.	"Jero"	6:21
2.	"Prelude"	5:37
3.	"See"	10:46

== Personnel ==
=== Azimuth ===
- John Taylor – piano, organ
- Kenny Wheeler – trumpet, flugelhorn
- Norma Winstone – vocals
