= What Now? (Kenny Wheeler album) =

Studio album by Kenny Wheeler
- Released: January 20, 2006
- Recorded: June 1 & 2, 2004
- Studio: Sear Sound, New York City
- Genre: Jazz
- Length: 64:48
- Label: CAM Jazz; CAMJ 7768-2
- Producer: Ermanno Basso

Kenny Wheeler chronology
Where Do We Go from Here? (2004)	What Now? (2006)	It Takes Two! (2005)

What Now? is an album by flugelhornist and composer Kenny Wheeler recorded in 2004 and released on the CAM Jazz label in early 2006.

== Reception ==
Professional ratings
Review scores
Source	Rating
AllMusic	4/5 stars
All About Jazz	4.5/5 stars

The AllMusic review by Scott Yanow states "This music generally takes its time yet never becomes sleepy or overly predictable, because the players listen closely to each other and often think as one. Although the program would have benefited from the inclusion of a barnburner for variety, What Now? succeeds as both background mood music and a thoughtful set of inventive jazz".

On All About Jazz, John Kelman noted "One can only be in awe of Wheeler, who at 75 continues to create new music that is distinctive in its somewhat bittersweet texture, consistently harmonically rewarding but also wholly accessible. ... With Wheeler heard only on flugelhorn, there's a richer warmth and smoother blend between his instrument and Potter's tenor. And while the overall approach is lyrical, that doesn't mean there isn't plenty of excitement".

In JazzTimes, Mike Shanley wrote "Wheeler's writing contains some graceful harmonic tricks that the band devours, but the languid mood might require several listens to make sure the subtleties don't simply float into the open air"

== Track listing ==
All compositions by Kenny Wheeler.

1. "Iowa City" – 9:59
2. "One Two Three" – 8:13
3. "March Mist" – 6:17
4. "The Lover Mourns" – 7:40
5. "The Sweet Yakity Waltz" – 8:46
6. "What Now?" – 7:45
7. "For Tracy" – 6:17
8. "Verona" – 9:34

== Personnel ==
- Kenny Wheeler – flugelhorn
- Chris Potter – tenor saxophone
- John Taylor – piano
- Dave Holland – bass
