= Sweet Things (Georgie Fame album) =

Studio album by Georgie Fame and the Blue Flames
- Released: May 1966
- Recorded: 1965–1966
- Genre: R&B; soul
- Length: 39:05
- Label: Columbia
- Producer: Denny Cordell

Georgie Fame UK chronology
Fame at Last! (1964)	Sweet Things (1966)	Sound Venture (1966)

"Last Night"
Sample of "Last Night", written by Bob Laine

Professional ratings
Review scores
Source	Rating
Record Mirror	4/5 stars

Sweet Things is the 1966 third album with the Blue Flames by Georgie Fame which reached No.6 in the album Top Ten in the UK. Following this album, his band the Blue Flames was replaced with the Tornados.

The album, issued on the Columbia label (SX 6043), has been described as "one of the finest British R&B albums of the mid-'60s."

== Style and content ==
Reviewing the album for AllMusic, Dave Thompson says that it ".. follows in the footsteps of its predecessors, a punchy R&B stomper that could (even should) have been recorded live, so high is the energy, and so abandoned the backing of the Blue Flames."

== Track listing ==
Side one
No.	Title	Writer(s)	Length
1.	"Sweet Thing"	William "Mickey" Stevenson	2:35
2.	"See Saw"	Don Covay	2:46
3.	"Ride Your Pony"	Naomi Neville	2:42
4.	"Funny How Time Slips Away"	Willie Nelson	3:17
5.	"Sitting In The Park"	Billy Stewart	3:26
6.	"Dr. Kitch"	Chris Blackwell, Lord Kitchener	4:00

Side two
No.	Title	Writer(s)	Length
7.	"My Girl"	Ronald White, Smokey Robinson	2:58
8.	"Music Talk"	Clarence Paul, Stevie Wonder, Ted Hull	3:22
9.	"The 'In' Crowd"	Billy Page	2:59
10.	"The World Is Round"	Rufus Thomas	2:41
11.	"The Whole World's Shaking"	Sam Cooke	3:12
12.	"Last Night"	Bob Laine	5:07

== Personnel ==
- Georgie Fame – Hammond organ, vocals
- Colin Green – guitar
- Glenn Hughes – baritone saxophone
- Peter Coe – alto saxophone
- Eddie "Tan Tan" Thornton – trumpet
- Cliff Barton – bass
- John "Mitch" Mitchell – drums
- Neemoi "Speedy" Acquaye – "African" percussion
