= Gnu High =

Studio album by Kenny Wheeler
- Released: 1976
- Recorded: June 1975
- Studio: Generation Sound; New York City
- Genre: Jazz
- Length: 40:36
- Label: ECM 1069 ST
- Producer: Manfred Eicher

Kenny Wheeler chronology
Song for Someone (1973)	Gnu High (1976)	Ensemble Fusionaire (1976)

Gnu High is an album by Canadian trumpeter and composer Kenny Wheeler recorded in June 1975 and released on ECM the following year. The quartet features rhythm section Keith Jarrett, Dave Holland and Jack DeJohnette.

== Reception ==
Professional ratings
Review scores
Source	Rating
AllMusic	4/5 stars
The Penguin Guide to Jazz Recordings	3.5/4 stars
DownBeat	4/5 stars

The AllMusic review by Michael G. Nastos calls the album "an auspicious starting point, albeit long winded, for a magical performer whose sound and smarts captured the imagination of so many fellow musicians and listeners from this point onward."

The DownBeat review by Mikal Gilmore assigned four stars and praised Wheeler's "purity of sound", finding his tone reminiscent of 1960s Miles Davis and his accuracy reminiscent of Dizzy Gillespie. But Gilmore wrote, "Wheeler’s attack and dynamics are monotonously dispassionate, his coloring and sonority undilutedly dull", and reserved his highest praise for Jarrett's accompaniment.

== Track listing ==
All tracks are written by Kenny Wheeler.

Side I
No.	Title	Length
1.	"Heyoke"	21:56

Side II
No.	Title	Length
1.	"Smatter"	6:01
2.	"Gnu Suite"	12:49

== Personnel ==
- Kenny Wheeler – flugelhorn
- Keith Jarrett – piano
- Dave Holland – bass
- Jack DeJohnette – drums
