= Angel Song (album) =

Studio album by Kenny Wheeler
- Released: February 11, 1997
- Recorded: February 1996
- Studios: Avatar (New York, New York)
- Genre: Jazz
- Length: 70:00
- Labels: ECM; ECM 1607
- Producer: Manfred Eicher

Kenny Wheeler chronology
All the More (1997)	Angel Song (1997)	A Long Time Ago (1999)

Professional ratings
Review scores
Source	Rating
AllMusic	2/5 stars
The Penguin Guide to Jazz Recordings	4/4 stars

Angel Song is a studio album by Kenny Wheeler, featuring Lee Konitz, Dave Holland and Bill Frisell, recorded in February 1996 and released on ECM the following year. The ensemble is notable for not including a drummer.

== Track listing ==
All tracks are written by Kenny Wheeler.

No.	Title	Length
1.	"Nicolette"	8:36
2.	"Present Past"	12:08
3.	"Kind Folk"	8:38
4.	"Unti"	9:55
5.	"Angel Song"	7:36
6.	"Onmo"	5:51
7.	"Nonetheless"	5:29
8.	"Past Present"	7:05
9.	"Kind of Gentle"	4:42

== Personnel ==
- Kenny Wheeler – flugelhorn, trumpet
- Lee Konitz – alto saxophone
- Dave Holland – bass
- Bill Frisell – guitar
