= Nightfall (Charlie Haden album) =

Studio album by Charlie Haden and John Taylor
- Released: March 1, 2004
- Recorded: October 8–9, 2003
- Studio: Roy O Disney Music Hall, California Institute of the Arts
- Genre: Jazz, Post-Bop
- Length: 57:58
- Label: Naim
- Producer: Charlie Haden, Ken Christianson, Ruth Cameron

Charlie Haden chronology
American Dreams (2002)	Nightfall (2004)	Land of the Sun (2004)

John Taylor chronology
Where Do We Go from Here? (2004)	Nightfall (2004)	Songs and Variations (2005)

Nightfall is a 2004 studio album by American jazz bassist Charlie Haden and British jazz pianist John Taylor. The record was released via the Naim label on March 1, 2004.

== Reception ==
Professional ratings
Review scores
Source	Rating
The Penguin Guide to Jazz Recordings	4/4 stars

John Kelman of All About Jazz wrote, "Taylor's touch is deft as always. Haden's sound is characteristically visceral, resonating deep in the body. Spartan yet strangely elegant, one can almost feel him choose the absolutely right note for the moment. On this introspective programme, Haden and Taylor create moments of unadulterated beauty. The almost painful poignancy of 'Touch Her Soft Lips' is a benchmark for the rest of the recording, as is the melancholy 'My Love and I'. Impeccably recorded, live with no editing, Nightfall puts two players with different approaches together; the result is both hauntingly beautiful and a lesson in simplicity."

Ian Latham of BBC stated, "Nightfall is an album of deeply introspective ballads. The partnership of these two experimental but extraordinarily melodic and expressive players is ideal. One senses that this is music for musicians... It is a real pleasure to listen to the quiet power of these master musicians who treat jazz as high art. Let's hope that this transatlantic collaboration is developed further."

== Track listing ==
No.	Title	Writer(s)	Length
1.	"Chairman Mao"	Haden	4:26
2.	"Nightfall"	Haden	6:08
3.	"My Love and I"	David Raksin, Johnny Mercer	7:33
4.	"Au Contraire"	Taylor	4:23
5.	"Windfall"	Taylor	6:07
6.	"Touch Her Soft Lips"	William Walton	6:15
7.	"Song for the Whales"	Haden	9:13
8.	"Bittersweet"	Don Sebesky	5:48
9.	"Silence"	Haden	8:04
Total length:			57:58

== Personnel ==
Musicians

- Charlie Haden – bass
- John Taylor – piano

Production

- Charlie Haden – producer
- Ken Christianson – producer, engineer, photography (cover)
- Ruth Cameron – assistant producer
- Evan Conway – assistant engineer
- Anna Tooth (Naim) – photography
- Alan Eder – piano technician
