= The Widow in the Window =

Studio album by Kenny Wheeler Quintet
- Released: Mid 1990
- Recorded: February 14–16, 1990
- Studio: Rainbow Studio; Oslo, Norway
- Genre: Jazz
- Length: 61:14
- Label: ECM; ECM 1417
- Producer: Manfred Eicher

Kenny Wheeler chronology
Music for Large & Small Ensembles (1990)	The Widow in the Window (1990)	Kayak (1992)

The Widow in the Window is a studio album by Canadian jazz trumpeter Kenny Wheeler recorded over three days in February 1990 and released on ECM later that year. The quintet features rhythm section John Abercrombie, John Taylor, Dave Holland and Peter Erskine.

== Writing and composition ==
"Ana", the longest piece on the album, was originally written for Alexander von Schlippenbach's Berlin Contemporary Jazz Orchestra (1990), recorded May the previous year. "Ma Belle Hélène" is a calembour which refers to Wheeler's two sisters, Mabel and Helen.

== Reception ==
The AllMusic review by Scott Yanow awarded the album 4 stars stating " Kenny Wheeler's music occupies its own unique area between post bop and free jazz and virtually all of his recordings are recommended to adventurous listeners, including this one."

Professional ratings
Review scores
Source	Rating
AllMusic	4/5 stars
The Penguin Guide to Jazz Recordings	4/4 stars

== Track listing ==
All tracks are written by Kenny Wheeler

No.	Title	Length
1.	"Aspire"	12:28
2.	"Ma belle Hélène"	8:45
3.	"The Widow in the Window"	10:27
4.	"Ana"	14:52
5.	"Hotel le hot"	8:31
6.	"Now, and Now Again"	6:11

== Personnel ==
- Kenny Wheeler – trumpet, flugelhorn
- John Abercrombie – guitar
- John Taylor – piano
- Dave Holland – bass
- Peter Erskine – drums
