= Double, Double You =

Studio album by Kenny Wheeler
- Released: 1984
- Recorded: May 1983
- Studio: Power Station, New York City
- Genre: Jazz
- Length: 49:04
- Label: ECM 1262
- Producer: Manfred Eicher

Kenny Wheeler chronology
Around 6 (1980)	Double, Double You (1984)	Visions (1985)

Professional ratings
Review scores
Source	Rating
AllMusic	4.5/5 stars
Los Angeles Times	4/5 stars
The Penguin Guide to Jazz Recordings	3.5/4 stars

Double, Double You is an album by Kenny Wheeler recorded in May 1983 and released on ECM on LP, CD and cassette the following year. The quintet features saxophonist Mike Brecker and rhythm section John Taylor, Dave Holland and Jack DeJohnette.

== Reception ==
The AllMusic review by Scott Yanow states "Kenny Wheeler's string of ECM recordings are all quite rewarding, generally avoiding the ECM stereotype of introspective long tones and silence... A generally memorable outing."

In a contemporary review for the Los Angeles Times, Leonard Feather writes:

With Michael Brecker on tenor sax and a rhythm section that is powerful both individually and collectively, he has produced a provocative and often stimulating set of six original works. The horns' interplay on "Three for D'reen," Holland's phenomenal solo on "Blue for Lou" and all five men on the 14-minute "Foxy Trot" share the credit. This could have been a five-star set, but lapses into one of those inevitable closing drum solos. Why? Why? 4 stars.

== Track listing ==
All tracks are written by Kenny Wheeler

Side one
No.	Title	Length
1.	"Foxy Trot"	14:08
2.	"Ma Bel"	3:54
3.	"W.W."	7:51

Side two
No.	Title	Length
1.	"Three for D'reen/Blue for Lou/Mark Time"	23:26

== Personnel ==
- Kenny Wheeler – trumpet, flugelhorn
- Mike Brecker – tenor saxophone
- John Taylor – piano
- Dave Holland – bass
- Jack DeJohnette – drums
