= Azimuth Systems =

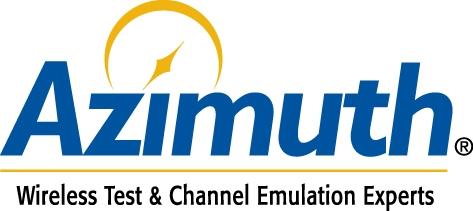
- Type: Private
- Industry: Wireless Test Equipment
- Founded: 2002
- Headquarters: Acton, Massachusetts
- Key people: Jim Iuliano (President and CEO) Chris Gollihur (Vice President of Finance and Administration); John Griesing (Vice President of R&D) Peter M. Paglia (Vice President of Sales and Business Development)
- Website: www.azimuthsystems.com

Azimuth Systems was a privately held company located near Boston, Massachusetts and in 2016, the company was acquired by Anritsu. The company's primary products include Wireless channel emulators and wireless test equipment for LTE, WiMAX, 2G/3G cellular, and Wi-Fi networks.

In 2009 Azimuth Systems wrote a White paper entitled Improving 4G Wireless Broadband Product Design through Effective Channel Emulation Testing.

In April 2010, Azimuth Systems was awarded the Best in Test award from Test & Measurement World Magazine.

In September 2016, Test solutions major Anritsu Corporation acquired Azimuth Systems.
