= Norma Winstone =

English jazz singer and lyricist (born 1941)

Norma Winstone MBE
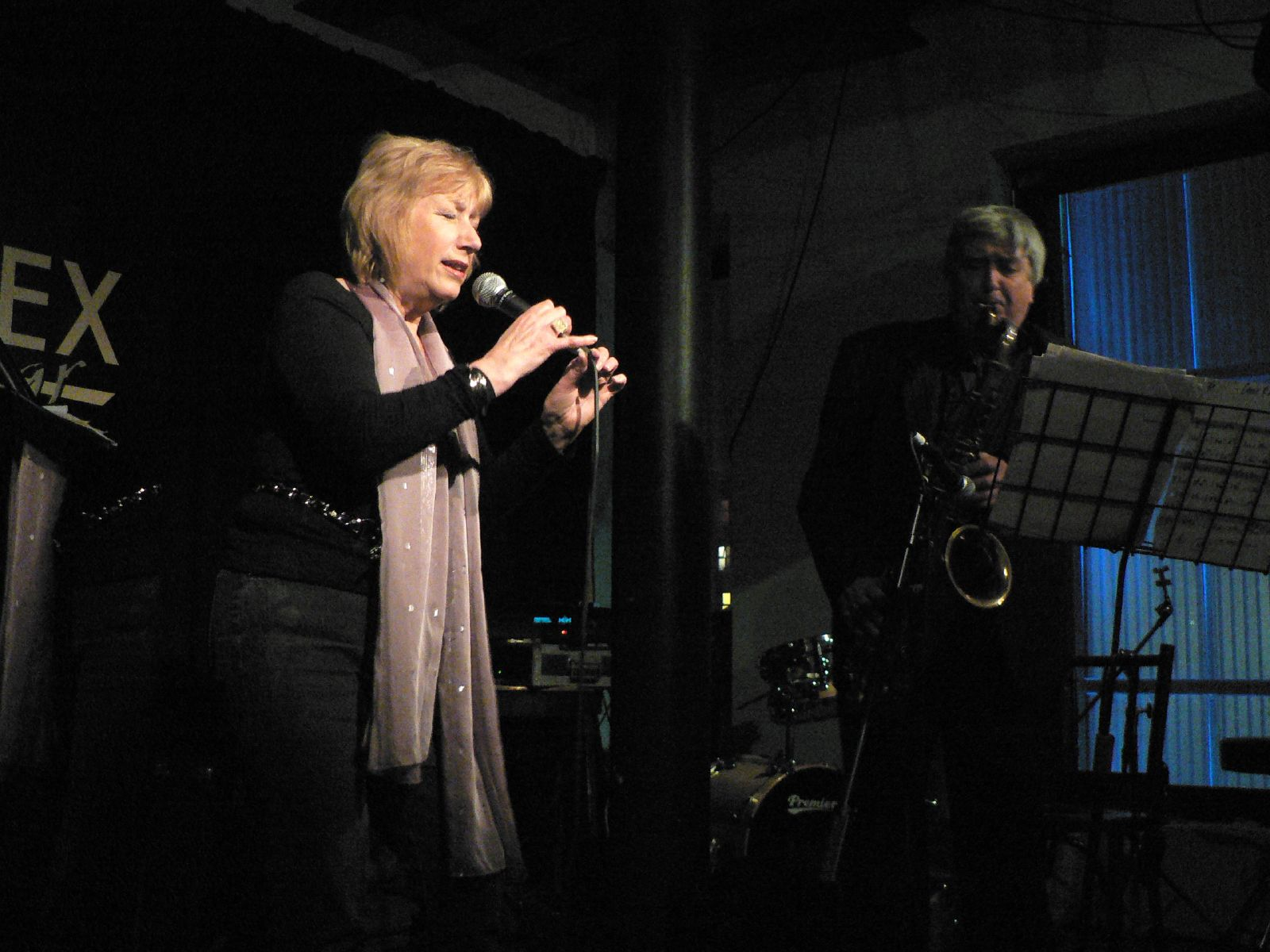
- Winstone in 2007

Background information
- Born: Norma Ann Short; 23 September 1941 (age 85); Bow, East London, England
- Genre: Jazz
- Occupations: Singer and lyricist
- Years active: 1960s–present
- Website: normawinstone.com

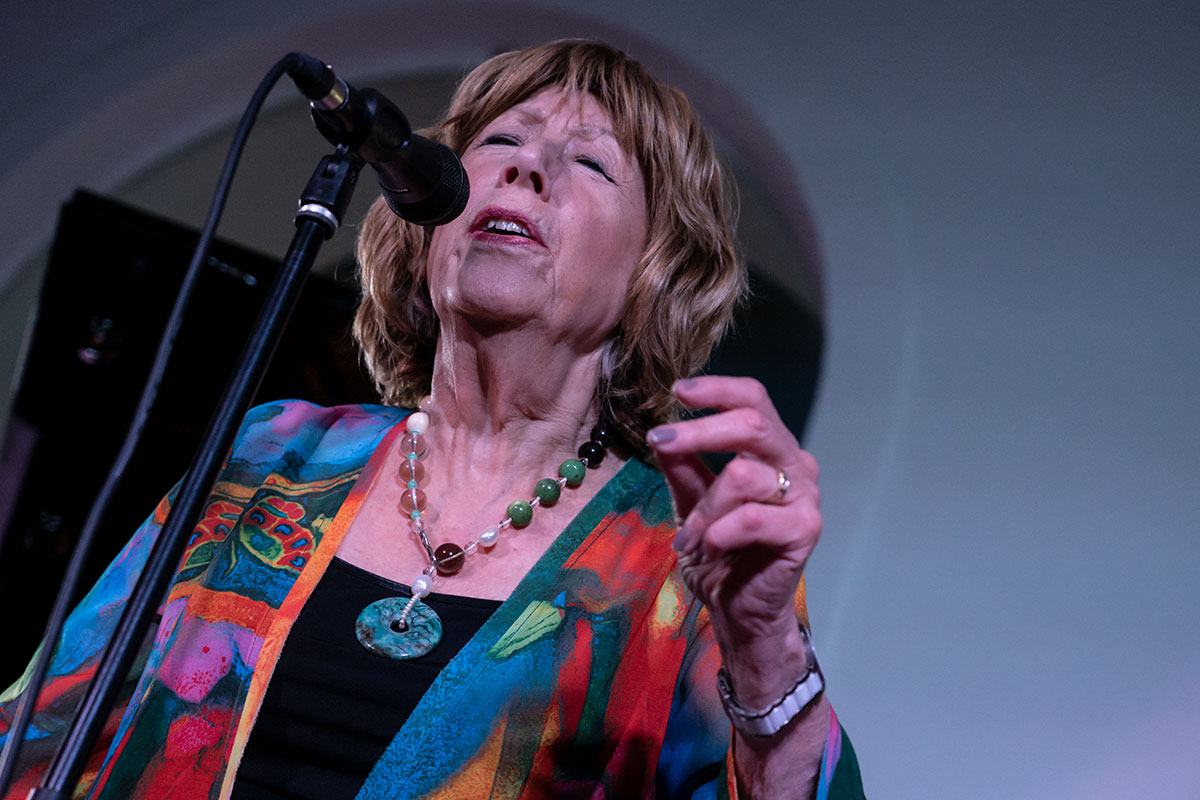
Aarhus (Denmark 2022) Photo Hreinn Gudlaugsson

Norma Ann Winstone MBE (born 23 September 1941) is an English jazz singer and lyricist. With a career spanning more than 50 years, she is best known for her contributions to improvised vocal music. Musicians with whom she has worked include Michael Garrick, John Surman, Michael Gibbs, Mike Westbrook, as well as pianist John Taylor, who was her former husband.

== Biography ==
=== Early years and education ===
Born as Norma Ann Short in Bow, East London, England, she was 10 years old when her family moved to Dagenham, Essex. Encouraged by her primary school teacher, she applied for and won a scholarship to attend Saturday-school at Trinity Music College, and after passing her 11-plus exams, she went to Dagenham County High School (where Dudley Moore was then a senior pupil). Like Moore, her music teacher there was Peter Cork (1926–2012). At the age of 17, she discovered jazz, listening to Ella Fitzgerald and Oscar Peterson being played on Radio Luxembourg.

=== Career ===
Winstone began singing in bands around Dagenham in the early 1960s, and has said of her early experiences: "I've always been on the edge, always felt like I was swimming against the tide and somehow couldn't stop. I met a pianist called Chris Goody and we'd get together and play things. He knew Margaret Busby who was in a publishing company called Alison and Busby. She also wrote lyrics for tunes like 'Naima'. I was inspired by her, though I didn't write words myself at that time, I didn't think I could."

Winstone first attracted attention when in the late 1960s she appeared at Ronnie Scott's Jazz Club sharing the bill with Roland Kirk. Interviewed in 2020, she said: "I went along to a gig at the Charlie Chester Club and I sat in with a drummer called John Stevens and he was incredibly enthusiastic and jumped up and said, 'I'm going to tell Ronnie Scott about you, he should give you an audition!' ... Eventually, I went to the club, and after reminding Ronnie that eight months before he promised to invite me for an audition, we got it and he gave me four weeks there opposite Roland Kirk. I think I was on cloud nine...." This led to her first radio BBC broadcast, which by chance was heard by singer Carmen McRae on a visit from the US, who met Winstone and was interviewed for a jazz magazine with her.

Winstone joined Michael Garrick's band in 1968. Her first recording came the following year, with Joe Harriott and Amancio D'Silva, on Hum-Dono (reissued in 2015). In 1971, she was voted top singer in the Melody Maker Jazz Poll, and she recorded the album Edge of Time, the first under her own name, in 1972. Interviewed in 2023, she recalled: "I decided that I would include as many of my friends as possible! So the tracks went from trio to 10 piece groups. There was no real musical concept behind it; just the opportunity to record in different settings. I guess it was a very unusual recording for the time and gave me the opportunity to explore different settings. Also it gave me the chance to get some arrangements by John Taylor, John Surman and John Warren."

Winstone contributed vocals to Ian Carr's Nucleus on that band's 1973 release Labyrinth, a jazz-rock concept album based on the Greek myth about the Minotaur.

Winstone has worked with many major European musicians and visiting Americans, as well as with most of her peers in British jazz, including Garrick, John Surman, Michael Gibbs, Mike Westbrook and her former husband, the pianist John Taylor. With Taylor and trumpeter Kenny Wheeler she performed and recorded three albums for ECM as a member of the trio Azimuth between 1977 and 1980; their fifth and last album How It Was Then… Never Again (1995) was given four stars by DownBeat magazine.

Her own 1987 album Somewhere Called Home, also released on the ECM label, has often been called "a classic". The review by AllMusic said: "It's not only a watermark of Winstone's career but, in the long line of modern vocal outings released since the romantic vocal tradition of Fitzgerald and Vaughan ended with free jazz and fusion, the disc stands out as one most original yet idyllic of vocal jazz recordings. ... A must for fans looking for something as cozy as a golden age chanteuse, but without all the gymnastic scatting and carbon copy ways of many a contemporary jazz singer."

In addition, she made albums with the American pianists Jimmy Rowles – Well Kept Secret, recorded in 1993 – and Fred Hersch. On Well Kept Secret Winstone sang lyrics she had written to Rowles' composition "The Peacocks", which she had heard on the Bill Evans album You Must Believe in Spring (1981). With the title "A Timeless Place", Winstone's lyrics were subsequently recorded by others, including Mark Murphy. Well respected as a lyricist, she has also written words to tunes by Ralph Towner, Egberto Gismonti, Ivan Lins, Steve Swallow, and other musicians. Her vocal style includes singing lyric-less passages, about which she has said: "I feel that there are some pieces that do not benefit from adding lyrics.... Adding words tells the listener what the piece is about, and sometimes it's good to leave interpretation of a piece to the listeners to make what they like of it. I have always heard the voice as an instrument, the most personal instrument, which has the added dimension of being able to deliver a lyric."

In 2001, Winstone was honoured as "Best Vocalist" in the BBC Jazz Awards, also being nominated in 2007 and 2008.

In February 2018, Winstone released Descansado: Songs for Films, a collection that AllMusic described as "an unusual and provocative album".

In 2019, Enodoc Records released the CD In Concert, a remastered recording of an August 1988 performance by Winstone and her ex-husband John Taylor at London's Guildhall School of Music and Drama, including music by Leonard Bernstein, Steve Swallow, Egberto Gismonti, Ralph Towner and Dave Brubeck, among others, with lyrics by Winstone herself, Johnny Mercer and Margaret Busby. Awarding four stars to this collaboration between Winstone and Taylor, Roger Farbey of All About Jazz wrote: "What In Concert demonstrates above all else is the extraordinarily synergistic relationship that this virtuosic pair shared."

In 2023, Winstone's vocal from Azimuth's 1977 album track "The Tunnel" was sampled by rapper Drake in his song "IDGAF" on his album For All The Dogs.

== Personal life ==
In 1972, Winstone married pianist John Taylor, whom she had met in 1966; they divorced after some years, although they later continued their musical partnership. Their two sons, Alex and Leo, are both musicians.

== Awards and honours ==
- 1971: voted top singer in the Melody Maker Jazz Poll
- 2001: "Best Vocalist" in BBC Jazz Awards
- 2007: MBE in the Queen's Birthday Honours
- 2009: Skoda Jazz Ahead Award in Bremen for contribution to European Jazz
- 2010: London Awards for Art and Performance
- 2010: Lifetime Achievement Jazz Medal from the Worshipful Company of Musicians
- 2010: Honorary Fellow at Trinity Laban Conservatoire
- 2013: Honorary Member of the Royal Academy of Music
- 2015: Jazz Vocalist of the Year, Parliamentary Jazz Awards
- 2015: BASCA Gold Badge Award
- 2017: Jazz FM Award for Vocalist of the year

== Discography ==
=== As leader ===
- Edge of Time (Argo, 1972)
- Live at Roncella Jonica, with Kenny Wheeler (Izemz/Polis, 1985)
- Somewhere Called Home (ECM, 1987)
- M.A.P., with John Wolfe Brennan (L+R, 1990)
- Far to Go (Grappa, 1993)
- Well Kept Secret (Hot House, 1995)
- Siren's Song, with Kenny Wheeler (Justin Time, 1997)
- Manhattan in the Rain (Sunnyside, 1998)
- Like Song, Like Weather, with John Taylor (Koch, 1999)
- Songs & Lullabies, with Fred Hersch (Sunnyside, 2003)
- Chamber Music (EmArcy, 2003)
- It's Later Than You Think with the NDR Big Band (Provocateur, 2006)
- Children of Time, with Michael Garrick (Jazz Academy, 2006)
- Amoroso... ..Only More So, with Stan Tracey (Trio, 2007)
- Distances (ECM, 2008)
- Yet Another Spring, with Michael Garrick (Jazz Academy, 2009)
- Stories Yet to Tell (ECM, 2010)
- Mirrors with Kenny Wheeler (Edition, 2013)
- Dance Without Answer (ECM, 2014)
- Westerly with The Printmakers including Nikki Iles & Mark Lockheart (Basho, 2015)
- Descansado: Songs for Films (ECM, 2018)
- In Concert, with John Taylor, 1988 (Enodoc Records, 2019)
- Outpost of Dreams, with Kit Downes (ECM, 2024)

With Azimuth

- Azimuth (ECM, 1977)
- The Touchstone (ECM, 1978)
- Départ (with Ralph Towner) (ECM, 1979)
- Azimuth '85 (ECM, 1985)
- How It Was Then... Never Again (ECM, 1995)

=== As guest ===
With Neil Ardley

- Harmony of the Spheres (Decca, 1979)

With Joe Harriott and Amancio D'Silva

- Hum-Dono (Columbia UK, 1969)

With Nucleus

- Labyrinth (Vertigo, 1973)

With Paul Rutherford and Iskra 1912

- Sequences 72 & 73 (Emanem, 1997)

With Eberhard Weber

- Fluid Rustle (ECM, 1979)

With Kenny Wheeler

- Song for Someone (Incus, 1973)
- Music for Large and Small Ensembles (ECM, 1990)

With Atlantic Jazz Collective

- Seascape (Alma Records, 2025)
