= Decipher (John Taylor album) =

Studio album by John Taylor
- Released: 1973
- Recorded: 1972–1973
- Studio: MPS Studio, Villingen, Schwarzwald-Baar, Germany
- Genre: Jazz
- Length: 36:41
- Label: MPS; MPS 21290

John Taylor chronology
Pause, and Think Again (1972)	Decipher (1973)

Decipher is the second album by jazz pianist John Taylor, featuring recently late Tony Levin on drums. It was recorded in 1972 and '73, and released on the MPS label. The album is rather obscure and the only recent CD reprint is a Japanese issue (2006), now out of print, which features an astounding 24-bit remastering.

== Track listing ==
All tracks composed by John Taylor

1. "Cipher/Waiting for Me" - 11:38
2. "Leaping" - 6:56
3. "Speak to Me" - 8:53
4. "Song for a Child " - 3:46
5. "White Magic" - 5:28

== Personnel ==
- John Taylor - piano
- Chris Laurence - bass
- Tony Levin - drums
