= Azimuth (album) =

Studio album by Azimuth
- Released: 1977
- Recorded: March 1977
- Studios: Talent Studio; Oslo, Norway
- Genre: Jazz
- Length: 43:29
- Labels: ECM; ECM 1099 ST
- Producer: Manfred Eicher

Azimuth chronology
Azimuth (1977)	The Touchstone (1978)

Azimuth is the debut album by British jazz trio Azimuth recorded in March 1977 and released on ECM later that year. The trio consists of pianist John Taylor, vocalist Norma Winstone, and trumpeter Kenny Wheeler.

== Reception ==
Professional ratings
Review scores
Source	Rating
AllMusic	4.5/5 stars
The Penguin Guide to Jazz	3/4 stars

The AllMusic review by Michael G. Nastos calls the compositions "deep improvisations, communicative and spiritual."

The Penguin Guide to Jazz Recordings says Winstone's voice "floats with a characteristic balance between freedom and control over Taylor's minimalistic piano figures. Any doubts that these are jazz-trained and jazz-centred performers are immediately dispelled." They described the title track as "a grand acoustic edifice that constantly reveals new areas of interest."

A reviewer for Aquarium Drunkard wrote, "Taylor's arpeggiated synthesizers provide the pulsing backdrop for the majority of these tracks with Winstone and Wheeler floating and weaving through the space above with improvisational interplay akin to a dance. 'The Tunnel', one of two tracks with actual poetry, has Winstone singing of the 'darkness into blackness, flying along on the rhythm track', perhaps describing the dark, reflective space the trio beautifully explore and inhabit on this ambient jazz classic."

Tyran Grillo, writing for ECM blog Between Sound and Space, called the album "an altogether fascinating mosaic of atmospheres."

== Track listing ==
All lyrics are written by Norma Winstone; all music is composed by John Taylor.

Side I
No.	Title	Length
1.	"Sirens' Song"	4:13
2.	"O"	6:49
3.	"Azimuth"	12:18
Total length:		23:20

Side II
No.	Title	Length
1.	"The Tunnel"	9:17
2.	"Greek Triangle"	2:05
3.	"Jacob"	8:47
Total length:		20:09 43:29

== Personnel ==
=== Azimuth ===
- John Taylor – piano, synthesizer
- Norma Winstone – vocals
- Kenny Wheeler – trumpet, flugelhorn

=== Technical personnel ===
- Manfred Eicher – producer
- Jan Erik Kongshaug – recording engineer
- Bob Ludwig – mastering engineer
- Barbara Wojirsch – layout
- Otl Aicher – cover photography
