= Azimuth (band) =

British jazz trio

Azimuth was a British jazz trio, active from 1977 through the early 2000s.

Azimuth began as a duo composed of vocalist Norma Winstone and her husband, pianist John Taylor. In the mid-1970s, Taylor contacted several record companies with the goal of recording a duo album, but during his appointment with ECM Records founder Manfred Eicher, the latter suggested that they form a trio with trumpeter Kenny Wheeler, and Azimuth was born. The group's first release was a 1977 ECM album; two further albums quickly followed, with later albums coming in 1985 and 1995.

Wheeler died in 2014, and Taylor died the following year.

Critic John Fordham wrote that the group conjured "a unique chemistry of low-key free improvisation, sometimes wordless vocals, jazz and classical music, and Taylor compositions that often sounded becalmed yet simmering with urgent implications." Richard Williams of The Times described them as "one of the most imaginatively conceived and delicately balanced of all contemporary chamber jazz groups."

== Discography ==
- Azimuth (ECM, 1977)
- The Touchstone (ECM, 1979)
- Départ (with Ralph Towner) (ECM, 1980)

(above three titles reissued as a 3 CD-set in 1994)

- Azimuth '85 (ECM, 1985)
- How It Was Then... Never Again (ECM, 1995)

== In popular culture ==
Drake's song "IDGAF" from his 2023 album For All The Dogs samples Azimuth's song The Tunnel from their 1977 debut album Azimuth.
