= Kenny Wheeler =

Canadian composer and musician (1930–2014)

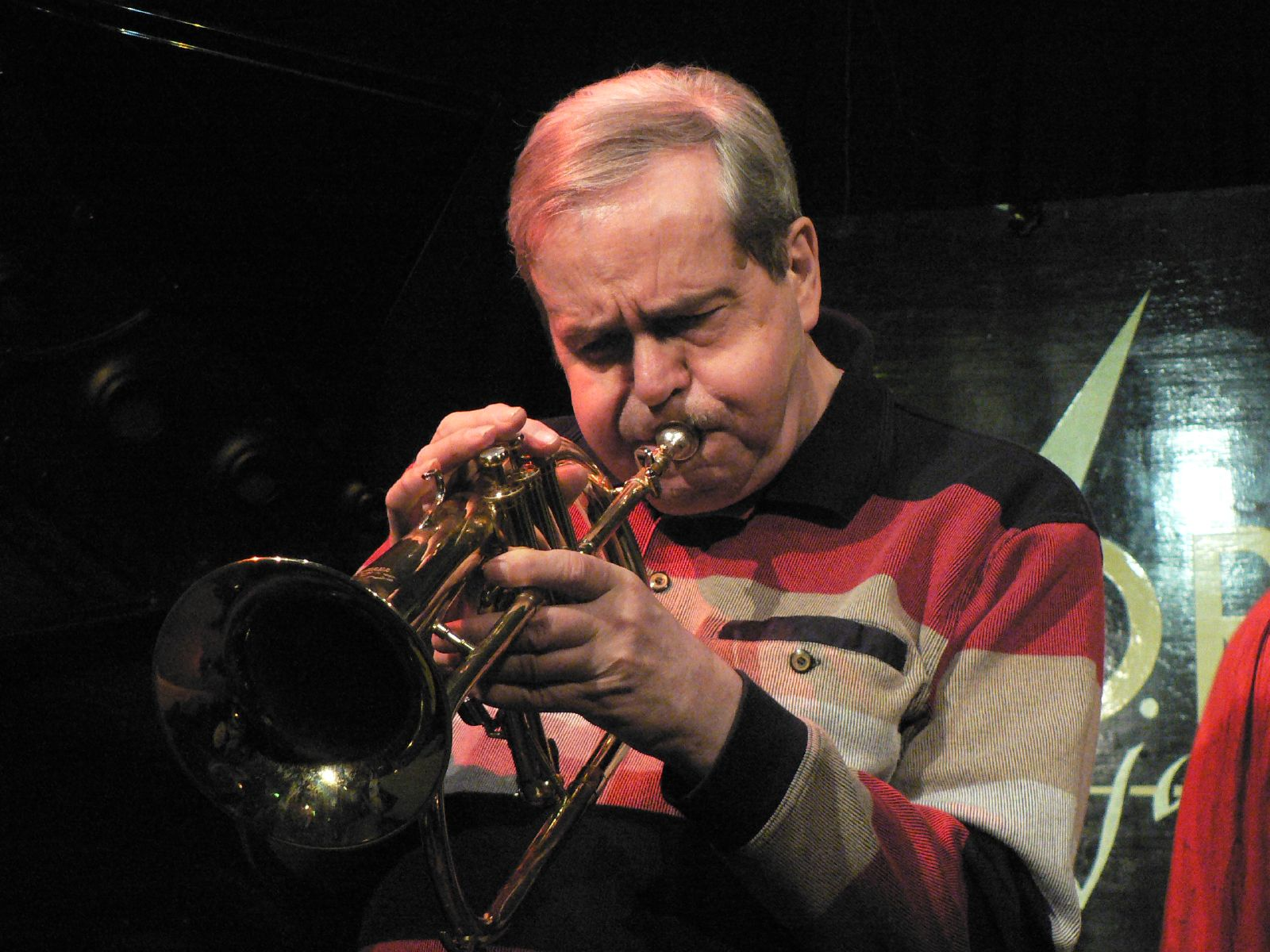
- Wheeler in 2007

Background information
- Born: Kenneth Vincent John Wheeler; 14 January 1930; Toronto, Ontario, Canada
- Died: 18 September 2014 (aged 84) London, England
- Genres: Jazz, avant-garde jazz, chamber jazz
- Occupation: Musician
- Instruments: Trumpet, flugelhorn
- Years active: 1950–2014
- Labels: ECM, Fontana, FMP, Soul Note, PSI, CAM Jazz

Kenneth Vincent John Wheeler, OC (14 January 1930 – 18 September 2014) was a Canadian composer and trumpet and flugelhorn player, based in the U.K. from the 1950s onwards.

Most of his performances were rooted in jazz, but he was also active in free improvisation and occasionally contributed to rock music recordings. Wheeler wrote more than one hundred compositions and was a skilled arranger for small groups and large ensembles.

Wheeler was the patron of the Royal Academy Junior Jazz course.

== Early life ==
Wheeler was born in Toronto, Ontario, on 14 January 1930. Growing up in Toronto, he began playing the cornet at age 12 and became interested in jazz in his mid-teens. Wheeler spent a year studying composition at The Royal Conservatory of Music in 1950. In 1952 he moved to Britain. He found his way into the London jazz scene of the time, playing in groups led by Tommy Whittle, Tubby Hayes, and Ronnie Scott.

== Career ==
In the late 1950s, he was a member of Buddy Featherstonhaugh's quintet together with Bobby Wellins. From 1959 until 1965 he was a member of John Dankworth's orchestra, during which time he also studied composition with Richard Rodney Bennett (1962-3) and Bill Russo (1963-4). In a 1961 interview with Kitty Grime, his fellow trumpeter and Dankworth band-member Dickie Hawdon exalted his Canadian colleague thus: "You name any British musician who doesn't copy records, and I'll name you one - Kenny Wheeler." He was also with (Eric Burdon and) the Animals' Big Band that made its only public appearance at the 5th Annual British Jazz & Blues Festival in Richmond (1965) with tenors Stan Robinson, Dick Morrissey and Al Gay, baritone sax Paul Carroll, and fellow trumpets Ian Carr and Greg Brown. In 1968, Wheeler appeared on guitarist Terry Smith's first solo album, Fall Out.

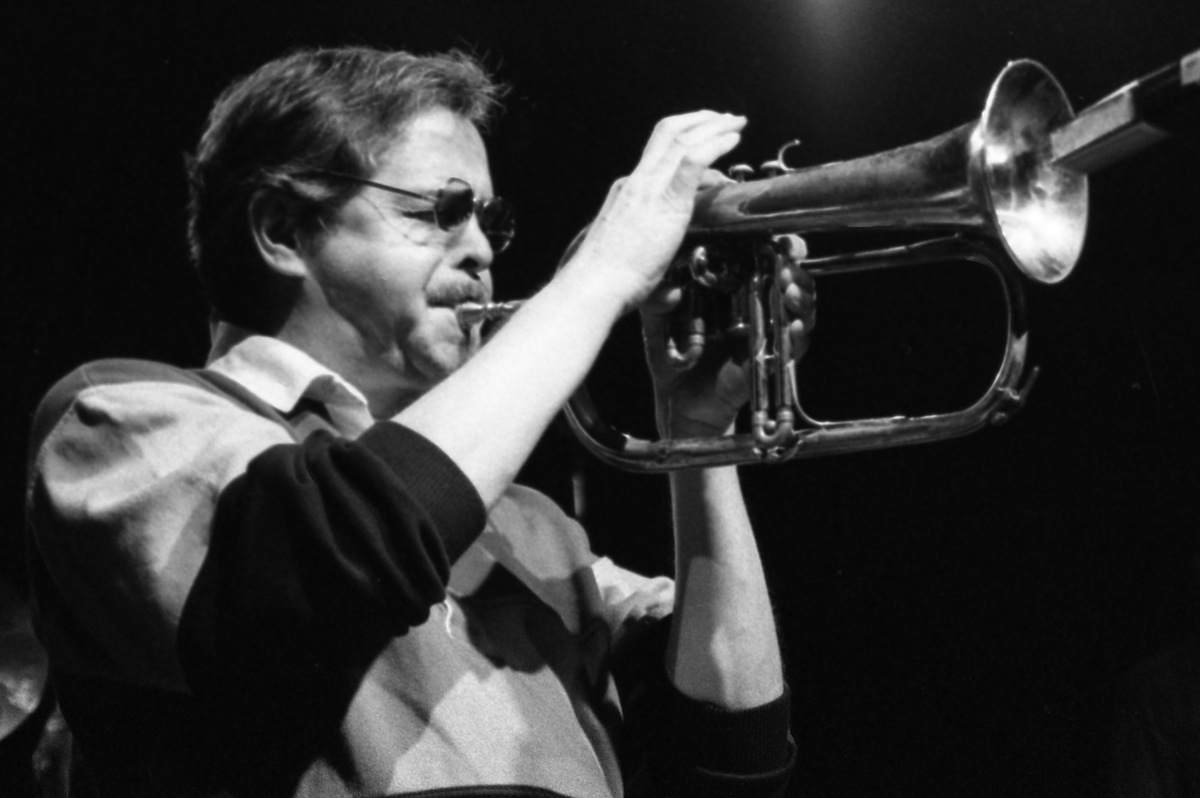
Wheeler performing with the United Jazz + Rock Ensemble, 1992

Wheeler performed and recorded his own compositions with large jazz ensembles throughout his career, beginning with the first album under his own name, Windmill Tilter (1969), recorded with the John Dankworth band. BGO Records released a CD in September 2010. The big band album Song for Someone (1973) fused Wheeler's characteristic orchestral writing with passages of free improvisation provided by musicians such as Evan Parker and Derek Bailey, and was also named Album of the Year by Melody Maker magazine in 1975. It has subsequently been reissued on CD by Parker's Psi label.

In the mid-1960s, Wheeler became a close participant in the nascent free improvisation movement in London, playing with Parker, John Stevens, the Spontaneous Music Ensemble and the Globe Unity Orchestra. Despite the above-noted accomplishments, much of his reputation rests on his work with smaller jazz groups. Wheeler's first small group recordings to gain significant critical attention were Gnu High (1975) and Deer Wan (1977), both for the ECM label (Gnu High is one of the few albums to feature Keith Jarrett as a sideman since his tenure with Charles Lloyd). One exception from the ongoing collaboration with ECM was his rare album on CBC called Ensemble Fusionaire in 1976. This had three other Canadian musicians and was recorded in St. Mary's Church in Toronto for a different character to the sound than on the ECM recordings.

Wheeler was the trumpeter in the Anthony Braxton Quartet from 1971 to 1976. He was also a member of the chamber jazz trio Azimuth with John Taylor and Norma Winstone from 1977 to 2000. Their first release under this name was a 1977 album issued by ECM; two albums followed, with later albums coming in 1985 and 1995. He was featured in a profile on composer Graham Collier in the 1985 Channel 4 documentary Hoarded Dreams.

== Later life ==
Music for Large & Small Ensembles (1990) included the Wheeler compositions "Sea Lady" and "The Sweet Time Suite", the latter his most ambitious extended work for big band since Windmill Tilter. In 1997 Wheeler received widespread critical praise for his album Angel Song, which featured an unusual drummer-less quartet of Bill Frisell (guitar), Dave Holland (bass) and Lee Konitz (alto sax). Wheeler recorded seven albums with CAM Jazz from 2005 to 2008 but returned to ECM to record his final album, Songs for Quintet, in 2013.

Wheeler died after a short period of frail health at a nursing home in London on 18 September 2014. He was 84 years old. He was survived by his wife, Doreen, and his children, Mark and Louanne.

== Discography ==
=== As leader/co-leader ===
- 1968: Windmill Tilter (Fontana) with The John Dankworth Orchestra
- 1973: Song for Someone (Incus)
- 1975: Gnu High (ECM)
- 1976: Ensemble Fusionaire (CBC)
- 1977: Deer Wan (ECM)
- 1980: Around 6 (ECM)
- 1984: Double, Double You (ECM)
- 1988: Flutter By, Butterfly (Soul Note)
- 1988: Visions (Justin Time)
- 1990: Music for Large & Small Ensembles (ECM)
- 1990: The Widow in the Window (ECM)
- 1991: Spanish Rhapsody (with Creative Art Ensemble Hungary by György Vukán)
- 1992: Kayak (Ah Um)
- 1997: All the More (Soul Note) recorded 1993
- 1997: Angel Song (ECM)
- 1999: A Long Time Ago (ECM)
- 2003: Island (Artists House) with Bob Brookmeyer
- 2003: Dream Sequence (Psi, 1995–2003 [2003])
- 2004: Where Do We Go from Here? (CAM Jazz) with John Taylor
- 2005: What Now? (CAM Jazz)
- 2006: It Takes Two! (CAM Jazz)
- 2008: Other People (CAM Jazz) with Hugo Wolf String Quartet featuring John Taylor
- 2011: One of Many (CAM Jazz) with John Taylor and Steve Swallow
- 2012: The Long Waiting (CAM Jazz)
- 2013: Mirrors (Edition Records) London Vocal Project with Norma Winstone
- 2013: Six for Six (CAM Jazz, recorded 2008)
- 2015: Songs for Quintet (ECM, recorded 2013)
- 2015: On the Way to Two (CAM Jazz, recorded 2005)
- 2026: What Was (False Walls, recorded 1995)

=== Collaborations with John Taylor ===
- with Norma Winstone, Paolo Fresu, Paolo Damiani, Tony Oxley: Live at Roccella Jonica (Ismez Polis, 1985)
- featuring Gabriele Mirabassi: Moon (Egea, 2001)
- with Riccardo Del Fra: Overnight (Sketch, 2002)
- Pause, and Think Again (Turtle, 1971)

==== As Azimuth ====
- Azimuth (ECM, 1977)
- The Touchstone (ECM, 1978)
- Départ, with Ralph Towner (ECM, 1979)
- Azimuth '85 (ECM, 1985)
- How It Was Then... Never Again (ECM, 1994)
- Siren's Song, with The Maritime Jazz Orchestra (Justin Time, 1997)

=== Other collaborations ===
- wrote/arranged "Ballad to Max" on Maynard Ferguson's album M.F. Horn (Columbia, 1970)
- arranged "Fire and Rain", "My Sweet Lord", and "Your Song" on Maynard Ferguson's album Alive & Well in London (Columbia, 1971)
- arranged "Theme from Summer of '42" and wrote/arranged "Free Wheeler" and "Country Road" on Maynard Ferguson's album M.F. Horn Two (Columbia, 1972)
- with Elton Dean and Joe Gallivan: The Cheque Is in the Mail (Ogun, 1977)
- with Günter Christmann, Gerd Dudek, Albert Mangelsdorff, Paul Rutherford, Manfred Schoof: Horns (FMP, 1979)
- with Gordon Beck, Tony Oxley, Stan Sulzmann, Ron Mathewson: Seven Steps to Evans (MPS, 1980)
- with Tiziana Simona: Gigolo (ITM, 1986)
- with Claudio Fasoli, Jean-François Jenny Clark, Daniel Humair: Welcome (Soul Note, 1987)
- with Claudio Fasoli and Jean-François Jenny Clark: Land (Innowo/New Sound Planet, 1989)
- with Gordon Beck, Tony Oxley, Stan Sulzmann, Dieter Ilg: A Tribute to Bill Evans (Image Entertainment DVD, filmed 1991, released 1999)
- with Jeff Gardner, Hein van de Geyn, André Ceccarelli: California Daydream (Musidisc, 1992)
- with David Friedman, Jasper van't Hof: Greenhouse Fables (Sentemo, 1992)
- with Paolino Dalla Porta, Stefano Battaglia, Bill Elgart: Tales (Soul Note, 1993)
- with Claudio Fasoli, Mick Goodrick, Henri Texier - double bass, Billy Elgart - drums: "Ten tributes" (Ram records, 1994)
- with Rabih Abou Khalil - Sultan's Picnic, Enja Records, 1994)
- with Vandoorn (Ineke Vandoorn & Marc van Vugt) - The Question is me, Riff/Baixim records 1994
- with Paul Bley: Touché (Justin Time, 1996)
- with Sonny Greenwich: Live at the Montreal Bistro (Justin Time, 1998)
- with Brian Dickinson: Still Waters [Hornblower, 1999)
- with Lee Konitz: Live at Birdland Neuberg (Double Moon, 1999)
- with Fred Hersch, Norma Winstone, Paul Clarvis: 4 in Perspective (Village Life, 2000)
- with Marc Copland and John Abercrombie: That's for Sure (Challenge, 2001)
- with Stan Sulzmann and John Parricelli: Ordesa (Symbol, 2002)
- with Enrico Pieranunzi, Chris Potter, Charlie Haden & Paul Motian: Fellini Jazz (CAM Jazz, 2003)
- with Marc Copland and John Abercrombie: Brand New (Challenge, 2004)
- with Tony Coe, John Edwards, Alan Hacker, Sylvia Hallett, Marcio Mattos, Evan Parker, Philipp Wachsmann: Free Zone Appleby 2003 (PSI, 2004)
- with Gerd Dudek, Paul Dunmall, John Edwards, Tony Levin, Tony Marsh, Evan Parker, Paul Rogers, Philipp Wachsmann: Free Zone Appleby 2005 (PSI, 2006)
- with Evan Parker, Paul Dunmall, Tony Levin, John Edwards: Live at the Vortex, London (Rare Music, 2011)
- with Evan Parker, Steve Beresford, John Edwards, Louis Moholo-Moholo: Foxes Fox: Live at the Vortex (PSI, 2012)

=== Featured ===
- Robert 'Bob' Cornford, Tony Coe, Kenny Wheeler and the NDR 'Pops' Orchestra: Long Shadows (Chapter One, 2007; recorded 1979)
- The Guildhall Jazz Band: Walk Softly (Wave, 1998; recorded 1987)
- The Jürgen Friedrich Quartet Featuring Kenny Wheeler: Summerflood (CTI, 1998; reissued 2003)
- Tim Brady: Visions (Justin Time, 1988) with L'orchestre de Chambre de Montréal
- Dezső "Ablakos" Lakatos (sax.), Kenny Wheeler (tr.), György Vukán (piano), Balázs Berkes (bass), Imre Kőszegi (drums), Creative Art Ensemble Brass & Rhythm, in "Spanish Rapsody" of György Vukán (CAE LP 002 Hungaroton, ARTISJUS 1991)
- The Upper Austrian Jazzorchestra: Plays the Music of Kenny Wheeler (West Wind, 1996)
- The Maritime Jazz Orchestra: Now and Now-Again (Justin Time, 2002; recorded 1998) with Norma Winstone and John Taylor
- UMO Jazz Orchestra: One More Time (A-Records, 2000) with Norma Winstone
- Munich Jazz Orchestra: Sometime Suite (Bassic Sound, 2001)
- Colours Jazz Orchestra: Nineteen Plus One (Astarte/Egea, 2009)

=== As sideman ===
With Duncan Hopkins

"Le Rouge" (Counterpoint Records, 1994)

With John Abercrombie

- Open Land (ECM, 1998)

With Rabih Abou-Khalil

- Blue Camel (Enja, 1992)
- The Sultan's Picnic (Enja, 1994)

With George Adams

- Sound Suggestions (ECM, 1979)

With Pepper Adams

- Conjuration: Fat Tuesday's Session (Reservoir, 1983 [1990})

With the Berlin Contemporary Jazz Orchestra

- Berlin Contemporary Jazz Orchestra (Conducted by Alexander von Schlippenbach) (ECM, 1990)

With Jane Ira Bloom

- Art and Aviation (Arabesque, 1992)
- The Nearness (Arabesque, 1995)

With Anthony Braxton

- The Complete Braxton (Freedom, 1971 [1973])
- News from the 70s (Musica Jazz/Felmay, 1971–1976 [1998])
- Quartet: Live at Moers Festival (Ring, 1974 [1976])
- New York, Fall 1974 (Arista, 1974)
- Five Pieces 1975 (Arista, 1975)
- The Montreux/Berlin Concerts (Arista, 1975-6)
- Creative Orchestra Music 1976 (Arista, 1976)
- Creative Orchestra (Köln) 1978 (hatART, 1978 [1995])

With Jakob Bro

- 2011: Bro/Knak (Loveland)

With Bill Bruford

- Feels Good to Me (EG, 1978)

With Rainer Brüninghaus

- Freigeweht (ECM, 1980)

With Don Cherry

- Actions (Philips, 1971)

With Steve Coleman

- Rhythm in Mind (Novus, 1991)

With CCS

- C.C.S. (RAK, 1970)

With Graham Collier

- Deep Dark Blue Centre (Deram, 1967)
- Hoarded Dreams (Cuneiform, 1983 [2007])

With Paolino Dalla Porta

- Tales (Soul Note, 1993)

With John Dankworth With Pierre Favre

- Window Steps (ECM, 1995)
- What the Dickens! (Fontana, 1963)

With Claudio Fasoil

- Welcome (Soul Note, 1987)
- Guest (Soul Note, 1994)
- Ten Tributes (1995)

With Bill Frisell

- Rambler (ECM, 1985)

With Globe Unity Orchestra

- Globe Unity 67 & 70 (Atavistic, 2001), 1970 recording only
- Live in Wuppertal (FMP, 1973)
- Hamburg '74 with the NDR Chor (FMP, 1979)
- Evidence Vol. 1 (FMP, 1976; reissued on Rumbling, 1991)
- Into the Valley Vol. 2 (FMP, 1976; reissued on Rumbling, 1991)
- FMP S 6...Plus (FMP, digital download, 2012)
- Jahrmarkt/Local Fair (Po Torch, 1977)
- Improvisations (JAPO/ECM, 1977)
- Compositions (JAPO/ECM, 1979)
- Intergalactic Blow (JAPO, 1983)
- 20th Anniversary (recorded 1986, FMP, 1993)
- 40 Years (Intakt, 2007)

With Paul Gonsalves

- Humming Bird (Deram, 1970)

With Dave Holland Quintet

- Jumpin' In (ECM, 1984)
- Seeds of Time (ECM, 1985)
- The Razor's Edge (ECM, 1987)

With Mark Isaacs

- Elders Suite (Grace Recordings, 1999)

With Philly Joe Jones

- Trailways Express (Black Lion, 1968 [1971])

With Chris Kase

- A Song We Once Knew (Satchmo Jazz, 2000)

With Andy Middleton

- Reinventing the World (2003)

With Joni Mitchell

- Travelogue (Nonesuch, 2002)

With Roscoe Mitchell

- Sketches from Bamboo (Moers Music, 1979)

With Louis Moholo-Moholo

- Spirits Rejoice! (Ogun, 1978)

With Tony Oxley

- Ichnos (RCA Victor, 1971)

With Enrico Pieranunzi

- As Never Before (2008)

With Paul Rutherford and Iskra 1912

- Sequences 72 & 73 (Emanem, 1997)

With Tommy Smith

- Azure (Linn, 1995)

With Wadada Leo Smith

- Divine Love (ECM, 1978)

With Thomas Stabenow

- What’s New (2010)

With David Sylvian

- Brilliant Trees (Virgin, 1984)
- Alchemy: An Index of Possibilities (Virgin, 1985)
- Gone to Earth (Virgin, 1986)
- Dead Bees on a Cake (Virgin, 1999)

With John Surman

- John Surman (Deram, 1969)
- Tales of the Algonquin (Deram, 1971)

With Ralph Towner

- Old Friends, New Friends (ECM, 1979)

With Glauco Venier Trio

- Gorizia (Artesuono, 2013)

With Ernst Vranckx

- A Child’s Blessing (1998)

With Fabio Zeppetella

- Moving Lines (1995)
