= Both Sides Now (Joni Mitchell album) =

Studio album by Joni Mitchell
- Released: February 8, 2000
- Recorded: 1999
- Studios: AIR Lyndhurst Hall, London; Ocean Way, Los Angeles
- Genres: Pop; rock; jazz
- Length: 51:35
- Label: Reprise
- Producers: Joni Mitchell, Larry Klein

Joni Mitchell chronology
Taming the Tiger (1998)	Both Sides Now (2000)	Travelogue (2002)

Professional ratings
Review scores
Source	Rating
AllMusic	3/5 stars
Encyclopedia of Popular Music	4/5 stars
Robert Christgau	A−
Rolling Stone	3/5 stars
Stereophile	4.5/5 stars

Both Sides Now is a concept album and the seventeenth studio album by Canadian singer-songwriter Joni Mitchell that was released in 2000. The album won two Grammy Awards in 2001 for Best Traditional Pop Vocal Album and Best Instrumental Arrangement Accompanying Vocalist(s) for the song "Both Sides Now" and a Juno Award for Vocal Jazz Album of the Year.

== Background and release ==
The album traces the progress of the modern relationship through Mitchell's orchestral renditions of classic jazz songs. Two of her own songs are included: "A Case of You" (1971) and "Both Sides Now" (1969). The orchestra was arranged and conducted by Vince Mendoza.

In the liner notes, co-producer Larry Klein describes the album as "a programmatic suite documenting a relationship from initial flirtation through optimistic consummation, metamorphosing into disillusionment, ironic despair, and finally resolving in the philosophical overview of acceptance and the probability of the cycle repeating itself".

A limited run of copies was released on February 8, 2000, in chocolate box packaging for Valentine's Day with several lithographs of Mitchell paintings. A jewel case edition was released on March 20, 2000.

On tour, Mitchell performed the songs in the same sequence as the album, but she opened with the overture "Nuages", the first movement from Nocturnes, an orchestral suite composed by Claude Debussy. "Nuages" is the French word for "clouds". Clouds is the name of the album on which Joni's version of the song "Both Sides Now" made its appearance, following Judy Collins 1967 version.

== Reception ==
Stereophile reviewer Richard Lehnert assigned the album 4.5 stars for both performance and sound. The album was featured as the "Recording of the Month". Lehnert wrote,

"Mitchell's voice seems ever more complexly faceted even as age and tobacco increasingly roughen its cut. Her high notes remain, however weakened, but her low register has grown more textured and expressive with each record. Her interpretive strengths here are less the scat coloratura of Ella Fitzgerald and Sarah Vaughan, more the intimate musical monologues of Betty Carter and Shirley Horn, with a good helping (especially on "You've changed") of Billie Holiday's rhythmic coyness. But Mitchell's vocal style is entirely her own — the pure folk roots of her early albums are as evident here as are the flavors of the jazz singers she's studied in the 30 years since".

AllMusic reviewer William Ruhlmann assigned the album 3 stars. He called Mitchell "a master of phrasing and tone. Mitchell often sounds like an alternate Billie Holiday, with the breathiness and note decay characteristic of later Holiday, if none of her delayed timing".

JazzTimes reviewer Sean Daly wrote that Mitchell, "gives somber, soulful readings" and that she "retains much of her lonely storyteller’s charm, keeping her denim-clad readings honest and heartfelt while the myriad instruments swoon behind her. These songs obviously mean something more to Mitchell than mere chances to slow dance, and the fusion of the vastly different worlds is enlightening".

Colin Larkin assigned 4 stars to the album in the Encyclopedia of Popular Music. Larkin wrote, "Both Sides Now was essentially an album of covers, one of which was an excellent cover version of Etta James' 'At Last'. Other highlights included a string-laden recording of 'Both Sides Now'."

The New Rolling Stone Album Guide assigned the release 3 stars. The review states, "Mitchell's mature voice, darkened to an elegiac timbre through decades of smoking, brings added poignancy to the standards she personalizes on Both Sides Now".

== Track listing ==
No.	Title	Writer(s)	Length
1.	"You're My Thrill"	lyrics: Sidney Clare; music: Jay Gorney	3:52
2.	"At Last"	Mack Gordon, Harry Warren	4:28
3.	"Comes Love"	Lew Brown, Sam H. Stept, Charles Tobias	4:29
4.	"You've Changed"	Bill Carey, Carl Fischer	5:00
5.	"Answer Me, My Love"	Fred Rauch, Gerhard Winkler; English lyrics: Carl Sigman	3:23
6.	"A Case of You"	Joni Mitchell	5:52
7.	"Don't Go to Strangers"	Redd Evans, Arthur Kent, David Mann	4:10
8.	"Sometimes I'm Happy"	Irving Caesar, Clifford Grey, Vincent Youmans	3:58
9.	"Don't Worry 'bout Me"	Rube Bloom, Ted Koehler	3:49
10.	"Stormy Weather"	Harold Arlen, Ted Koehler	3:07
11.	"I Wish I Were in Love Again"	Lorenz Hart, Richard Rodgers	3:36
12.	"Both Sides Now"	Joni Mitchell	5:45

== Personnel ==
- Joni Mitchell – vocals
- Mark Isham – trumpet
- Richard Henry – bass trombone
- Dave Stewart – bass trombone
- Owen Slade – tuba
- Wayne Shorter – soprano and tenor saxophone
- Skaila Kanga – harp
- Herbie Hancock – piano
- David Arch – piano
- Chuck Berghofer – bass guitar
- Mike Brittain – bass guitar
- Mary Scully – bass guitar
- Chris Laurence – double bass
- Peter Erskine – drums
- Frank Ricotti – percussion
- Andrew Findon – flute
- Helen Keen – flute
- Jamie Talbot – flute, alto flute, clarinet, alto saxophone
- Philip Todd – flute, alto flute, clarinet
- Stan Sulzmann – flute, clarinet
- Nicholas Bucknall – clarinet
- John Anderson – oboe
- Sue Bohling – oboe, cor Anglais
- Anthony Pike – clarinet, bass clarinet
- Iain Dixon – clarinet, bass clarinet
- Julie Andrews – bassoon
- Gavin McNaughton – bassoon
- Richard Skinner – contrabassoon
- Andy Crowley, Derek Watkins, Gerard Presencer, John Barclay, Steve Sidwell – trumpet
- Hugh Seenan, John Pigneguy, Michael Thompson, Nigel Black, Paul Gardham, Philip Eastop, Richard Watkins – French horn
- Neil Sidwell, Pete Beachill, Peter Davies, Richard Edwards – trombone
- Antonia Fuchs, Ben Cruft, Boguslaw Kostecki, Cathy Thompson, Chris Tombling, David Woodcock, Dermot Crehan, Everton Nelson, Godfrey Salmon, Jackie Shave, Jim McLeod, Jonathan Strange, Julian Leaper, Katherine Shave, Maciej Rakowski, Matthew Scrivener, Michael McMenemy, Patrick Kiernan, Perry Montague-Mason, Peter Oxer, Rebecca Hirsch, Rita Manning, Roger Garland, Simon Fischer, Vaughn Armon, Warren Zielinski, Wilf Gibson – violin
- Bill Benham, Bruce White, Catherine Bradshaw, Donald McVay, Ivo Van Der Werff, Katie Wilkinson, Peter Lale, Rachel Bolt – viola
- Anthony Pleeth, Davd Daniels, Frank Schaefer, Helen Liebmann, Martin Loveday, Paul Kegg, Tony Lewis – cello
- Gavyn Wright – concertmaster, violin
- Vince Mendoza – arranger, conductor
- Gordon Jenkins – co-arranger on "Stormy Weather"

== Charts ==
Chart performance for Both Sides Now
Chart (2000)	Peak position
Canada Top Albums/CDs (RPM)	19
German Albums (Offizielle Top 100)	63
Norwegian Albums (VG-lista)	20
Scottish Albums (Official Charts)	70
UK Albums (Official Charts)	50
US Billboard 200	66
European Albums (Eurotipsheet)	91

== Certifications ==
Region	Certification	Certified units/sales
United Kingdom (BPI)	Gold	100,000^{‡}
^{‡} Sales+streaming figures based on certification alone.
