= Derek Watkins (trumpeter) =

- Birth name: Derek Roy Watkins
- Born: 2 March 1945 Reading, Berkshire, England
- Died: 22 March 2013 (aged 68) Claygate, Surrey, England
- Genres: Jazz, pop, classical, production
- Occupation(s): Musician, composer
- Instrument: Trumpet
- Years active: 1950s–2013
- Website: derekwatkins.co.uk

Derek Roy Watkins (2 March 1945 – 22 March 2013) was an English jazz, pop, and classical trumpeter. Best known for his lead trumpet work on the soundtracks of James Bond films, Watkins recorded with British jazz bandleaders as well as the Royal Philharmonic Orchestra, the London Symphony Orchestra, and The Beatles. Dizzy Gillespie called him "Mr. Lead".

== Life and career ==
Derek Watkins was born on 2 March 1945, in Reading, Berkshire, England. His great-grandfather had been a brass player in Wales with the Salvation Army. His grandfather taught brass at Reading University and was a founding member of the Reading Spring Gardens Brass Band, which he conducted until he was succeeded by Watkins' father. Watkins learned to play the cornet when he was four years old. He played in the brass band and with his father's dance band at Reading's Majestic Ballroom until he became a professional musician at age 17.

Beginning his professional career in London, Watkins was a member of Jack Dorsey's band at the Astoria Ballroom for two years (1963–65), and then joined Billy Ternent's orchestra at the London Palladium. He then became a freelance musician.

Watkins played in dance bands and big bands led by Ted Heath and John Dankworth, and in 1969 he toured and recorded with Benny Goodman. From 1970 to 1974 he worked as a studio musician in Los Angeles and recorded with The Beatles, Eric Clapton, Elton John, Frank Sinatra, and Barbra Streisand. He often performed at Dante's jazz club with Louie Bellson and Don Menza, and he played with Count Basie, Oscar Peterson and Dizzy Gillespie, who nicknamed Watkins "Mr. Lead". He was a longtime member of the James Last Orchestra.

In classical music he recorded with the Royal Philharmonic Orchestra and the London Symphony Orchestra and accompanied opera singers, including José Carreras, Plácido Domingo, and Kiri Te Kanawa.

His discography included the 1988 solo album, Increased Demand.

=== Film and television scores ===
Watkins is most notable for his soundtrack performances on James Bond films beginning with Dr. No and ending with Skyfall just before he died. In addition to the Bond film soundtracks, he played on the soundtracks Bridget Jones's Diary, Basic Instinct, Johnny English, Gladiator, Made in Dagenham, Superman and Superman II. His solo opens Chicago, the Academy Award-winning Best Picture of 2002.

Together with Colin Sheen and Jamie Talbot, Watkins composed incidental music for the TV series Midsomer Murders, and production music for KPM Music Ltd. He co-wrote and performs the music heard in the title sequence for "Murder Is Corny", a 2002 episode of the A&E TV series A Nero Wolfe Mystery.

=== Teaching and scholarship ===
Watkins was a professor of trumpet and commercial brass consultant at the Royal Academy of Music. He also began working on instrument development in 1975, consulting with Richard Smith of Boosey & Hawkes on the design of the Sovereign Studio trumpet. In 1985 they set up their own manufacturing company, Smith-Watkins Brass Instruments, which supplies handmade instruments to studio musicians, brass bands and the military.

=== Death ===
Derek Watkins died on 22 March 2013, from cancer, at the age of 68.

== Awards and honors ==
In April 2013, the Royal Academy of Music announced the creation of the Derek Watkins Chair of Trumpet.

== Discography ==
=== As leader ===
- Increased Demand (MA Music, 1988)
- Over the Rainbow (Zephyr, 1995)

=== As sideman ===
With Georgie Fame

- The Two Faces of Fame (CBS, 1967)
- The Third Face of Fame (CBS, 1967)
- Seventh Son (CBS, 1969)

With Peter Herbolzheimer

- Hip Walk (Polydor, 1976)
- Touchdown (Polydor, 1977)
- I Hear Voices (Polydor, 1978)
- Rhythm Combination and Brass (PolJazz, 1979)
- Fatman 2 (Koala, 1983)
- Latin Groove (Koala, 1987)
- More Bebop (Koala, 1989)

With James Last

- Non Stop Dancing 1976/2 (Polydor, 1976)
- Non Stop Dancing '77 (Polydor, 1976)
- New Non Stop Dancing 79 (Polydor, 1978)
- Live in London (Polydor, 1978)
- Seduction (Polydor, 1980)
- Hansimania (Polydor, 1981)
- Plus (Polydor, 1986)
- Berlin Concert (Polydor, 1987)
- Pop Symphonies (Polystar, 1991)
- Die Grossen Musical-Erfolge Von Andrew Lloyd Webber (Polydor, 1993)
- Pop Symphonies 2 (Polydor, 1997)
- New Party Classics (Polydor, 2002)
- They Call Me Hansi (Polydor, 2004)

With Jimmy Nail

- Take It or Leave It (Virgin, 1986)
- Crocodile Shoes II (EastWest, 1996)
- Ten Great Songs and an OK Voice (Papillon, 2001)

With Stan Tracey

- The Latin-American Caper (Columbia, 1969)
- We Love You Madly (Columbia, 1969)
- Live at the QEH (Blue Note, 1994)
- The Durham Connection (33 Jazz, 1999)

With Colin Towns

- Mask Orchestra (Jazz Label, 1993)
- Bolt from the Blue (Provocateur, 1997)
- Another Think Coming (Provocateur, 2001)

With Kenny Wheeler

- Windmill Tilter (Fontana, 1969)
- Music for Large & Small Ensembles (ECM, 1990)
- A Long Time Ago (ECM, 1999)
- The Long Waiting (CAM Jazz, 2012)

With Robbie Williams

- Life Thru a Lens (Chrysalis, 1997)
- Live at the Alber (Chrysalis, 2001)
- Swing When You're Winning (Chrysalis, 2001)

With Bill Wyman

- Struttin' Our Stuff (RCA Victor, 1997)
- Anyway the Wind Blows (RCA, 1998)
- Double Bill (Disky, 2001)
- The Kings of Rhythm Volume 1 (Edsel, 2016)

With others

- Neil Ardley, A Symphony of Amaranths (Regal Zonophone, 1972)
- Tina Arena, Songs of Love & Loss 2 (EMI, 2008)
- Brian Auger, Definitely What! (Disconforme, 1968)
- Kenny Baker, Tribute to the Great Trumpeters (Horatio Nelson, 1993)
- Lucio Battisti, La Sposa Occidentale (CBS, 1990)
- Ana Belén, Veneno Para El Corazon (Ariola, 1993)
- Madeline Bell, This Is One Girl (Pye, 1976)
- Belle and Sebastian, Dear Catastrophe Waitress (Rough Trade, 2003)
- Belle and Sebastian, I'm a Cuckoo (Rough Trade, 2004)
- Tony Bennett, Listen Easy (MGM, 1973)
- Matt Bianco, Matt Bianco (WEA, 1986)
- Terence Blanchard, She Hate Me (Milan, 2004)
- Bloc Party, Intimacy (Wichita, 2008)
- Blue Mink, A Time of Change (Regal Zonophone, 1972)
- Chris Botti, When I Fall in Love (Columbia, 2004)
- Cerrone, Cerrone IV The Golden Touch (Malligator, 1978)
- Judy Cheeks, No Outsiders (Polydor, 1988)
- Kenny Clarke/Francy Boland Big Band, The Second Greatest Jazz Big Band in the World (Black Lion, 1971)
- Kenny Clarke/Francy Boland Big Band, Clarke Boland Big Band en Concert avec Europe 1 (Tréma, 1992)
- Tony Coe, Zeitgeist (EMI, 1977)
- Freddy Cole, Sings (Black Horse, 1976)
- Elvis Costello, The Juliet Letters (Rhino, 2006)
- Joseph Curiale, Awakening (Black Box, 2002)
- John Dankworth, The $1,000,000 Collection (Fontana, 1967)
- Ray Davies, Red Hot Latin (JW Music, 1996)
- Delegation, Delegation II (Ariola, 1981)
- Barbara Dennerlein, Tribute to Charlie (Koala, 1987)
- Anne Dudley, A Different Light (Angel, 2001)
- Matt Dusk, Two Shots (Decca, 2004)
- Everything but the Girl, Baby the Stars Shine Bright (Blanco y Negro, 1986)
- Paloma Faith, Fall to Grace (Epic, 2012)
- Tim Garland, Libra (Global Mix, 2009)
- Michael Gibbs, Directs the Only Chrome-Waterfall Orchestra (Bronze, 1975)
- Benny Goodman, Benny Goodman in Concert (Decca, 1971)
- Ron Goodwin, Cinema Classics (KPM Music, 1997)
- Gitte Hænning, Gitte Haenning Meets the Francy Boland Kenny Clarke Big Band (Bureau B 1988)
- John Harle, The Shadow of the Duke (EMI, 1992)
- Alex Harvey, Roman Wall Blues (Fontana, 1969)
- Chaz Jankel, Looking at You (A&M, 1985)
- Salena Jones, Platinum (CBS, 1971)
- Tom Jones, At This Moment (Jive 1989)
- Grace Kennedy, Desire (DJM, 1979)
- Level 42, Forever Now (RCA/BMG, 1994)
- London Symphony Orchestra, 007 Classics (Edelton, 1989)
- Michel Legrand, The Concert Legrand (RCA Victor, 1975)
- David Lindup, When the Saints Go (Aristocrat, 1970)
- Henry Mancini, As Time Goes by and Other Classic Movie Love Songs (RCA Victor, 1992)
- The Manhattan Transfer, Live (Atlantic, 1978)
- Paul McCartney, Give My Regards to Broad Street (Parlophone, 1984)
- Frank McComb, The Truth Vol. 2 (Expansion, 2006)
- Jane McDonald, Love at the Movies (Universal, 2001)
- Melanie C, Stages (Red Girl, 2012)
- Anita Meyer, Past, Present and Future (Ariola, 1982)
- Joni Mitchell, Both Sides Now (Reprise, 2000)
- Alison Moyet, Voice (Sanctuary, 2004)
- New Jazz Orchestra, Le Dejeuner Sur L'Herbe (Verve, 1969)
- Oasis, Wonderwall (Creation, 1995)
- Billy Ocean, Inner Feelings (Epic, 1982)
- Sally Oldfield, Playing in the Flame (Bronze, 1981)
- Jack Parnell, Plays Music of the Giants (Music for Pleasure, 1975)
- Gilles Peterson, Impressed 2 with Gilles Peterson (Universal, 2004)
- Alan Price, Performing Price (Polydor, 1975)
- Cliff Richard, Cliff Richard (EMI, 1991)
- Ray Russell, Centennial Park (MMC, 1985)
- Seal, Seal II (ZTT, 1994)
- Jack Sharpe, Catalyst (Frog, 1987)
- Terry Smith, Fall Out (Philips, 1969)
- Stereophonics, Graffiti On the Train (Stylus, 2013)
- Amii Stewart, Time for Fantasy (RCA, 1988)
- Stan Sulzmann, Birthdays, Birthdays (Village Life, 1999)
- Take That, The Circus (Polydor, 2008)
- Ten Tenors, Here's to the Heroes (Warner, Bros. 2006)
- Clark Terry, Clark After Dark (MPS, 1978)
- Danny Thompson, Elemental (Island/Antilles, 1990)
- Lee Towers, Absolutelee (Ariola, 1981)
- Ultravox, U-Vox (Chrysalis, 1986)
- Butch Walker, Sycamore Meadows (Power Ballad, 2008)
- Scott Walker, The Drift (4AD, 2006)
- Westlife, Allow Us to Be Frank (RCA, 2004)
- Phil Woods, Images (RCA Victor, 1975)
- Workshy, The Golden Mile (WEA, 1989)
