= St. Nicholas' Church, Esbjerg =

Catholic church in Esbjerg, Denmark

Coordinates: 55°28′14″N 8°27′00″E

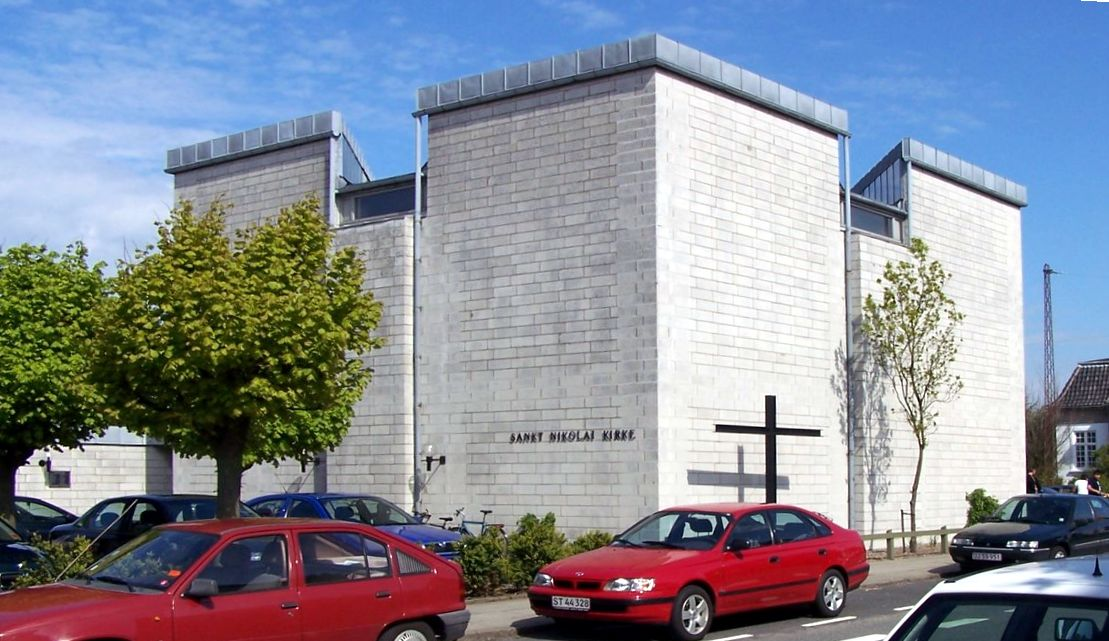
Sankt Nikolaj Church, Esbjerg

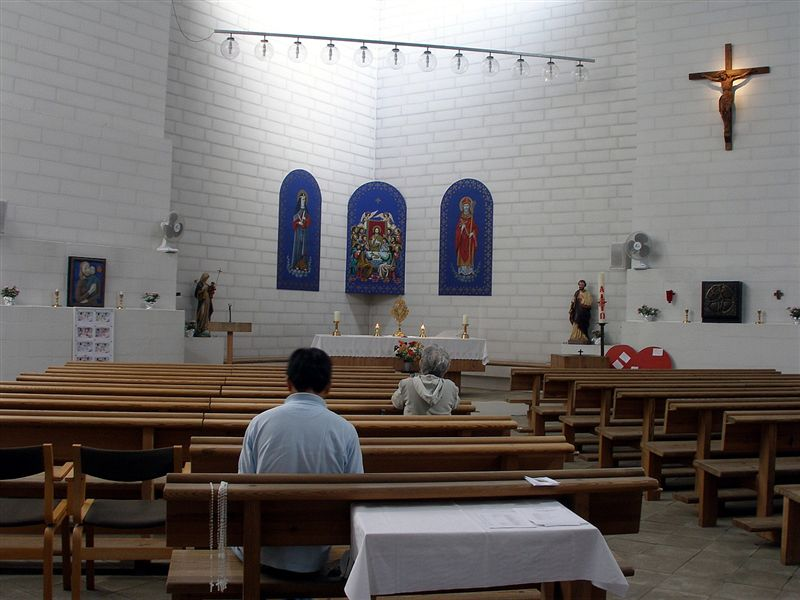
Interior

St Nikolaj Church (Danish: Skt. Nikolaj Kirke) is a Roman Catholic parish church in Esbjerg in the southwest of Jutland, Denmark. Designed by Johan Otto von Spreckelsen, the rectangular building of aerated concrete was completed and consecrated in 1969.

== Architecture ==
St Nikolaj Church was von Spreckelsen's first cube and square design which he developed around New Year 1968. As a result, it became known as kubekirken (the cube church). He was later to use the same approach in designing the Grande Arche in Paris, completed in 1989. The dimensions of the inner cube of St Nikolaj Church are very close to those of the "holy of holies" in Solomon's Temple as described in Ezekiel 40:5.

The use of aerated concrete was unusual at the time. It was considered to be a creative, aesthetically new solution chosen by the architect who was working on a tight budget. As with von Spreckelsen's other churches, the walls are topped by a horizontal belt, in this case made of zinc. They are broken by slightly lower projecting sections with windows at the top, bringing light down into the interior. The recessed roof rests on these projections while the cube's four tower-like corners also allow light to penetrate into the church. The simple square-shaped structure is unusual for a religious building.

Although small and modest, the church has a very expressive design. The geometric, crystalline form of the interior gives a spatial effect, allowing the room to grow beyond its boundaries. Lighting from above gives the white concrete walls a receding look. The woodwork is pine while the flooring is of cement tiles and pine. The altar, which stands on a low podium, stands opposite the entrance and the organ. There is a bench behind the altar for the priest while the congregation sits on pews which fan out forming a semi-circle around the altar. The complex also consists of a rectory as well as a wing with meeting rooms. The glazed passageway joining these to the church acts as an entrance to both the church and the other facilities. The church has seating for 100.

== Literature ==
- Den danske arkitektur. Gyldendal A/S. 2009. pp. 448–. ISBN 978-87-02-05401-9.
