= Symbolic Globe =

Structure outside UNESCO in Paris

Coordinates: 48°50′57.8″N 2°18′17.4″E

The Symbolic Globe is a monument, since November 1995 situated on the piazza of UNESCO in Paris, France, surrounded by the flags of all nations, pointing out that this is the headquarters of the international organization. The Symbolic Globe was originally conceived for the United Nations Summit on Social Development, March 1995. During the Summit, it was built in the centre of Copenhagen by the delegates, who had come from every corner of the earth.

Transferred to the piazza of UNESCO in Paris, the Symbolic Globe was inaugurated on 7 November 1995 by Federico Mayor.

== Appearance ==
It is inspired by the logo of the United Nations and formed as a minimal structure, fifteen meters in diameter. The idea was conceived by Erik Reitzel, and the Danish Ministry of Culture financed its realization.

The word "symbol" comes from the old Greek symbolon, which actually means sign or token. In ancient Greece, when friends separated, the host would break an object and give a piece of it to each guest. When they met again, each one would bring his/her fragment and put the object back together again. By recreating the object, they demonstrated their links of friendship as guests. This idea of sharing and friendship would then be perpetuated during the United Nations Summit in Copenhagen. The 10.000 delegates, originating from all the countries of the world, would each receive a symbolon enabling them to put together a lasting structure: the Symbolic Globe. It is probably the first time that the people of the world have worked together to erect a bearing structure and to experience the joy of constructing.

Erik Reitzel's experience with minimal structures was utilized, in particular his experience from building the external lift tower of la Grande Arche in Paris. A completely new building system had to be developed based on the use of special joints, rods, and bracing wires which are easy to mount, demount and transport. The development of the building system was a result of interaction between his research, education, and practice.

The greater part of the Symbolic Globe was made from a special sort of aluminium (type 7075) by contractor Emil Nielsen Smithy.

== Publications ==
- The Symbolic Globe, UNESCO Publishing, Paris 2006. ISBN 92-3-104028-6 and ISBN 978-92-3-104028-3
- The Society seen through a Civil Engineer’s Glasses, Danish Civil and Structural Science and Engineering. 2003. ISBN 8798988700
- Les forces dont resultent quelques monuments Parisiens de la Fin du XXe siècle, LE POUVOIR ET LA VILLE À L’ÉPOQUE MODERNE ET CONTEMPORAINE, Sorbonne 2001. ISBN 2747526100
- De la rupture à la structure, Colloque Franco-danois sur Représentation de l'espace, répartition dans l'espace - sur différentes manières d'habiter, 2000. ISBN 8798781707

== Film ==
- The Invisible Forces, (55 min) producer: JJ – Film. Premiere in Paris 2002, arte 2006
- La Sonate de la Rupture, (7 min) producer: JJ-Film, 2000
