= La Traversée de Paris (album) =

Studio album by Michael Nyman
- Released: 1989
- Genre: Contemporary classical music

Michael Nyman chronology
| Drowning by Numbers (1989) | La Traversée de Paris (1989) | The Cook The Thief His Wife & Her Lover (1989) |

La Traversée de Paris (The Crossing of Paris) is an album by the Michael Nyman Band featuring music composed by Michael Nyman for an audio-visual exhibition of the same name which took place at the Grande Arche de la Défense from July to December 1989 to celebrate the bicentennial of the French Revolution.

== Track listing ==
The album consists of 17 pieces, each referring to a specific or generic location, historical incident, or cultural development in Paris since the time of the Revolution. There is a geographical emphasis to the first six pieces which describe the city itself without historical context. The subsequent pieces proceed in chronological order by namesake, as a musical timeline charting the city's rich and often violent history from 1789 to 1989.

1. L'entrée.
2. La nef de Paris ("The Nave of Paris").
3. Débarcadère ("Docks").
4. Le Labyrinthe.
5. Le Palais Royal.
6. Le jardin ("Garden").
7. Le théâtre d'ombres chinoises ("Shadow Theatre").
8. L'émeute de la faim ("Hunger Riots").
9. Du faubourg à l'Assemblée ("From the suburbs to the Assembly").
10. "Ah ça ira" ("It will succeed!"). Refers to a bloodthirsty execution-chant from the Revolution. With the London Voices.
11. Passage de l'Égalité ("The Egalitarian Movement").
12. Les murs des fédérés ("The Communards' Wall"). A setting of Rimbaud's poem L'orgie parisienne. With Sarah Leonard.
13. De l'Hôtel de Ville à la Concorde ("From City Hall to the Concorde").
14. Cinéma d'actualités ("Newsreel").
15. Champs Elysées.
16. Les manifestations ("Protests").
17. L'Arche de la Défense. Refers to the contemporary setting of the exhibition.

== Musicians ==
- The Michael Nyman Band
  - Alexander Balanescu
  - Elisabeth Perry
  - Clare Connors
  - Jonathan Carney
  - Tony Hinnigan
  - Justin Pearson
  - Paul Morgan
  - Robin McGee
  - David Rix
  - David Fuest
  - John Harle
  - Jamie Talbot
  - Simon Haram
  - Andrew Findon
  - Graham Ashton
  - Richard Clews
  - Huw Jenkins
  - Steve Saunders
- Sarah Leonard
- London Voices directed by Terry Edwards

== Prospero's Books ==
Seven pieces from La Traversée de Paris were repurposed or revised by Nyman to form the bulk of his score for Peter Greenaway's film Prospero's Books.

Four of these pieces did not undergo any changes, and were simply retitled for their use in the film and for the score's album release:

- Débarcadère (retitled "Reconciliation").
- Du faubourg à l'Assemblée (retitled "Prospero's Curse").
- Passage de l'Égalité (retitled "Cornfield").
- Cinéma d'actualités (retitled "History of Sycorax").

The other three pieces were revised to varying degrees:

- L'entrée, in an extended form, became "Prospero's Magic".
- Le Labyrinthe, with the addition of a vocal line, became "Come Unto These Yellow Sands".
- Le théâtre d'ombres chinoises, in a much shorter form, became "Miranda".

Two other pieces were used in the film but were not included on the soundtrack CD:

- De L'Hôtel de Ville à la Concorde, used at a low level under the scene in which Prospero summons the harpies.
- Les Murs des Fédérés, with the Rimbaud text removed but Sarah Leonard's higher register melody intact for the scene in which Prospero 'drowns' his books.

== Other performances and recordings ==
- An Eye For a Difference, London Saxophonic's album of Nyman pieces arranged for saxophone ensemble, contains arrangements of both Le Palais Royal and De l'Hôtel de Ville à la Concorde.
- Nyman's opera-ballet Noises, Sounds & Sweet Airs (adapted from William Shakespeare's The Tempest) utilizes a number of melodies from La Traversée de Paris, including De l'Hôtel de Ville à la Concorde in "There's nothing ill can dwell" and Le théâtre d'ombres chinoises in "Ye Elves".
- The Michael Nyman Songbook, a concert film and album featuring Ute Lemper singing with the Michael Nyman Band, contains a different performance of Les murs des fédérés (L'orgie parisienne).
- The Very Best of Michael Nyman: Film Music 1980-2001, a double-disc compilation album, contains Le théâtre d'ombres chinoises under the title "Miranda Previsited".
