= La Traversée de Paris =

La Traversée de Paris may refer to:

- La Traversée de Paris (album), a 1989 album by the Michael Nyman Band
- La Traversée de Paris (film), a 1956 French film by Claude Autant-Lara
