= Paul Andreu =

French architect (1938–2018)

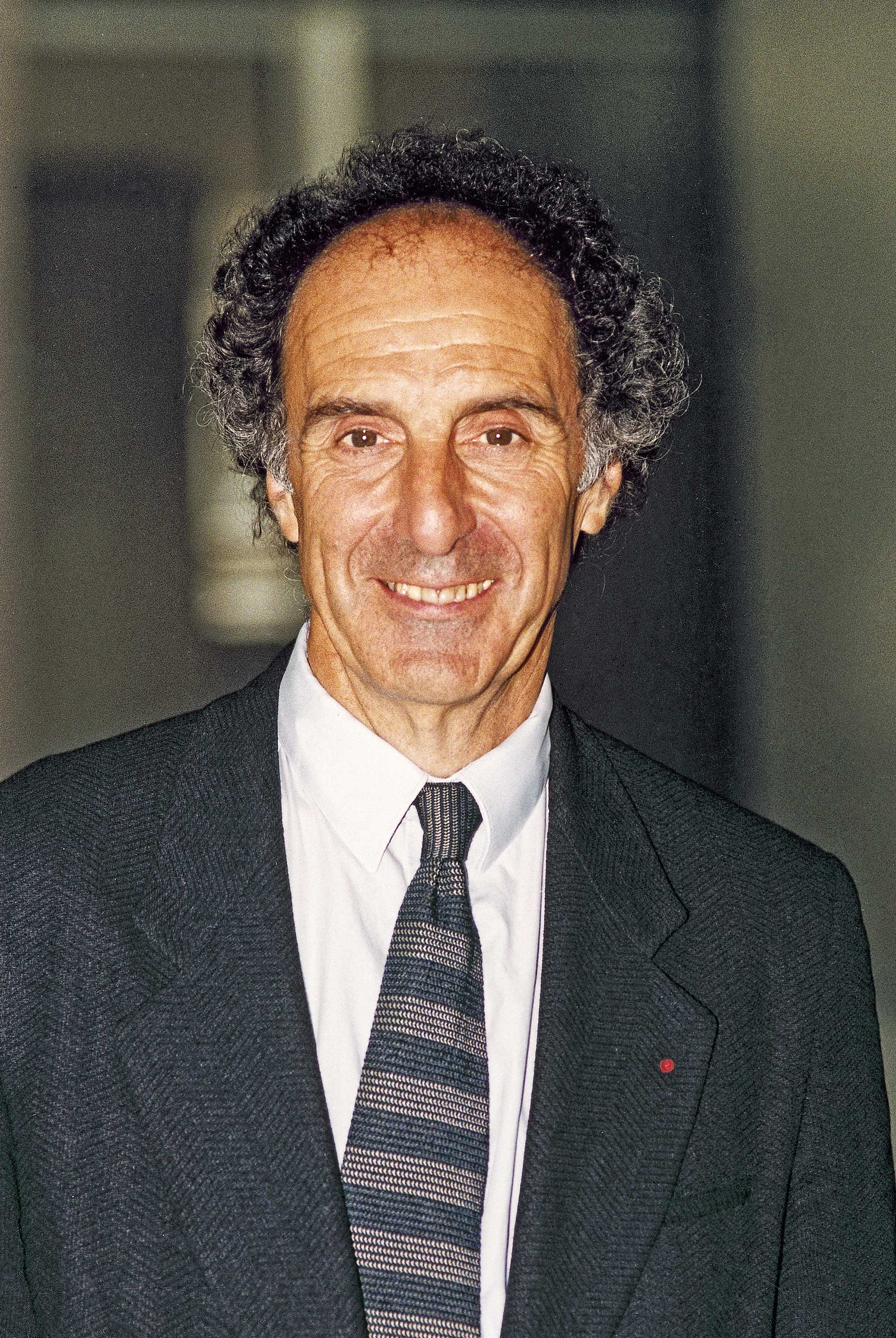
- Born: 10 July 1938; Bordeaux, France
- Died: 11 October 2018 (aged 80); Paris, France
- Education: Lycée Louis-le-Grand; École Polytechnique; École des ponts ParisTech
- Occupations: Architect; Civil engineer

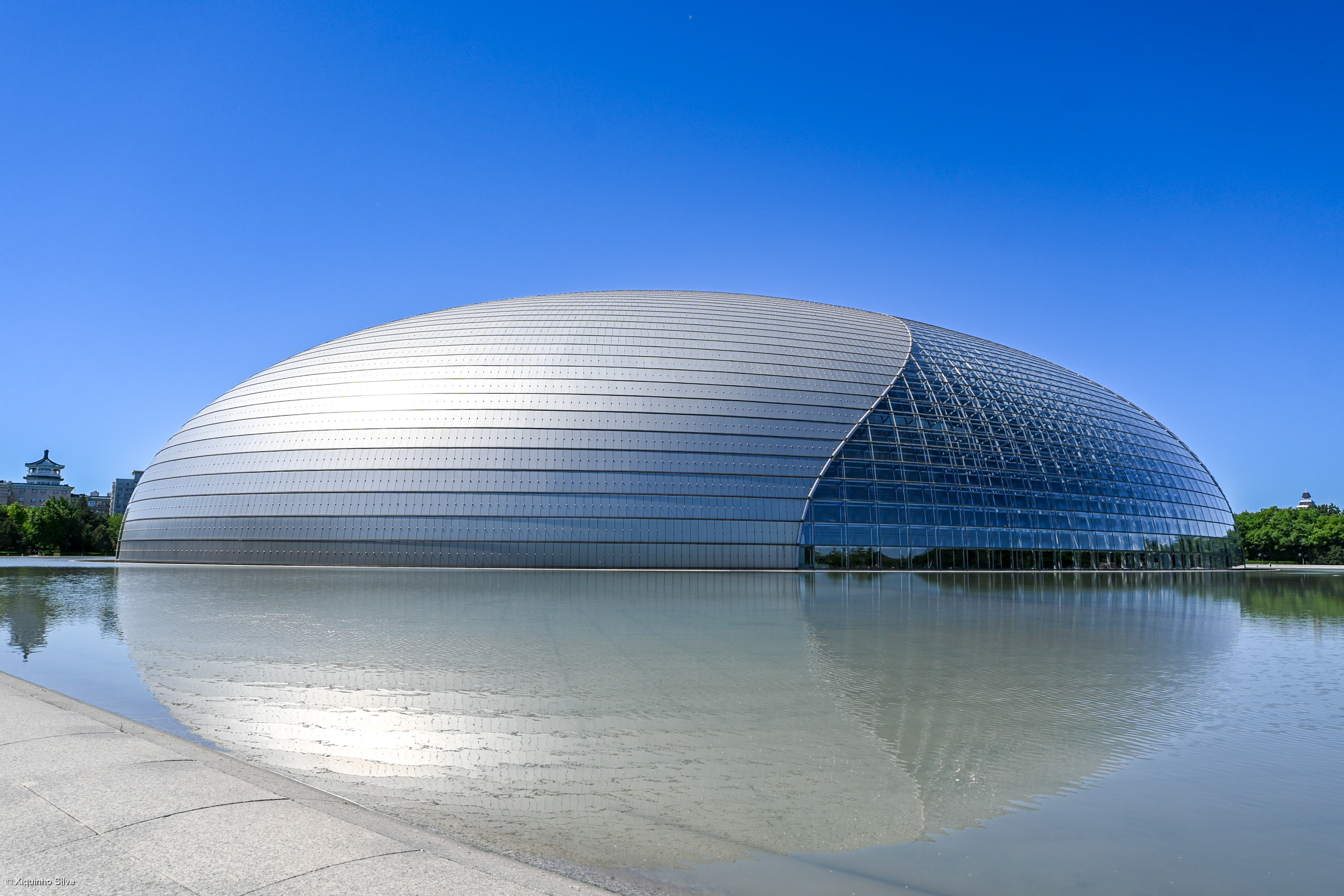
National Grand Theatre, Beijing

Paul Andreu (10 July 1938 – 11 October 2018) was a French architect, known for his designs of multiple airports such as Charles de Gaulle Airport in Paris, and multiple prestigious projects in China, including the National Centre for the Performing Arts in Beijing.

== Early life and education ==
Andreu was born at Caudéran (Gironde), in southwest France. He graduated in 1958 from the École Polytechnique and continued his studies at the École des ponts ParisTech, graduating in 1961. He next studied under architect Paul Lamarche in the École des Beaux-Arts, graduating in 1968.

== Projects ==
Andreu was responsible for the design of numerous airports, including Ninoy Aquino International Airport (Manila), Soekarno-Hatta International Airport (Jakarta), Shanghai Pudong International Airport in China, Abu Dhabi International Airport, Dubai International Airport, Tehran Imam Khomeini International Airport, Cairo International Airport, Brunei International Airport, and the Charles de Gaulle Airport, and Orly Airport in Paris.

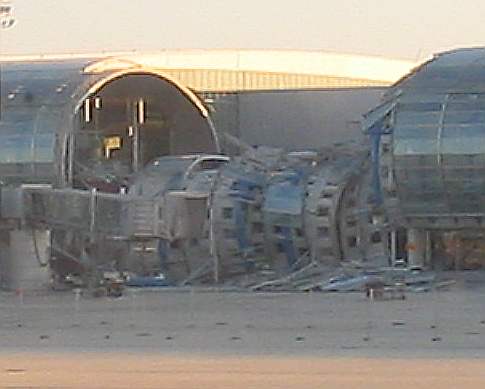
Collapsed Terminal 2E, June 2004

He was in charge of planning and constructing Charles de Gaulle Airport (Roissy) in Paris from 1967 on. On 23 May 2004 a portion of Terminal 2E collapsed, killing four people. Terminal 2E, inaugurated in 2003, is the seventh terminal at Roissy by Andreu, and has been described as one of Andreu's boldest designs. The collapse was attributed by the ad hoc administrative enquiry commission to a variety of technical causes and the lack of margins of safety in the design. Andreu blamed the collapse on poor execution by the building companies.

Andreu's other projects included the Grande Arche at La Défense in Paris (as associate of Johann Otto von Spreckelsen), Shandong Grand Theater in Jinan and the National Grand Theater of China enclosed in a titanium and glass shell near Beijing's Tiananmen Square which was inaugurated on 22 December 2007.

In 2008, Andreu was hired to design a cultural centre and ticket office in Montreal's new Quartier des Spectacles entertainment district.

== Other activities ==
In 2011, Andreu became dean emeritus and chair professor of the Architecture Department at Zhejiang University in Hangzhou, China, where he taught three months per year. In 2015 and 2016, he was a member of the Prix Versailles judges panel.
