= A Long Time Ago (album) =

Studio album by Kenny Wheeler
- Released: October 19, 1999
- Recorded: September 1997, January 1998
- Studios: Gateway Studio; Kingston, England
- Genre: Jazz
- Length: 63:50
- Labels: ECM; ECM 1691
- Producer: Manfred Eicher

Kenny Wheeler chronology
Angel Song (1997)	A Long Time Ago (1999)	Island (2003)

Professional ratings
Review scores
Source	Rating
AllMusic	3/5 stars

A Long Time Ago is an album by Canadian jazz trumpeter Kenny Wheeler recorded in September 1997 and January 1998 and released on ECM October the following year. The trio features pianist John Taylor and guitarist John Parricelli backed by a brass octet conducted by Tony Faulkner.

== Track listing ==
All compositions by Kenny Wheeler.

1. "The Long Time Ago Suite" – 31:56
2. "One Plus Three (Version 1)" – 2:20
3. "Ballad for a Dead Child" – 5:58
4. "Eight Plus Three / Alice My Dear" – 8:30
5. "Going for Baroque" – 3:21
6. "Gnu Suite" – 9:23
7. "One Plus Three (Version 2)" – 2:22

== Personnel ==
- Kenny Wheeler – flugelhorn
- John Taylor – piano
- John Parricelli – guitar
- Tony Faulkner – conductor
  - Derek Watkins, John Barclay, Henry Lowther, Ian Hamer – trumpet
  - Mark Nightingale, Pete Beachill (tracks 2–7), Richard Edwards (track 1) – trombone
  - Sarah Williams, Dave Stewart – bass trombone
