= Boom-Jackie-Boom-Chick =

Studio album by Paul Gonsalves
- Released: 1964
- Recorded: February 27, 1963
- Genre: Jazz
- Length: 35:15
- Label: Vocalion (UK)
- Producer: ?

Paul Gonsalves chronology
Rare Paul Gonsalves Sextet in Europe (1963)	Boom-Jackie-Boom-Chick (1964)	Just Friends (1965)

Professional ratings
Review scores
Source	Rating
The Penguin Guide to Jazz Recordings	3/4 stars

Boom-Jackie-Boom-Chick is a jazz album recorded in 1963 by Paul Gonsalves.

The album's liner notes claim that it was recorded in the "winter of 1962-63" in Switzerland after an impromptu meeting between Gonsalves and the British rhythm section. The album was recorded Feb 27, 1963. At the time, Gonsalves was in Paris with the Duke Ellington orchestra, and it is speculated that the session was organized by British musician Jackie Sharpe (Jack Sharpe) and actually recorded at Lansdowne Studios in London, with the Switzerland story concocted for the liner notes to avoid problems with US and UK music union regulations. Sharpe is credited in the liner notes as "Paul's pal, club-owner, musician and fight-fan" and the inspiration for the title song.

The original LP was pressed in small quantities, allegedly around 500, making it a rare collector's item. The title song was included on the compilation Impressed 2 with Gilles Peterson in 2004, and the full album was reissued in 2006.

"Poor Butterfly" had been previously recorded by Gonsalves on the album Duke Ellington at the Bal Masque and was reprised here, according to the liner notes, to allow Gonsalves a longer solo.

== Track listing ==
1. "Boom-Jackie-Boom-Chick" (Gonsalves)
2. "I Should Care" (Stordahl, Weston, Cahn)
3. "Village Blues" (John Coltrane)
4. "If I Should Lose You" (Robin, Rainger)
5. "Poor Butterfly" (Golden, Burnside, Hubbell)
6. "Blue P.G." (Gonsalves)
7. "You Are Too Beautiful" (Rodgers, Hart)
8. "Taboo" (Stillman, Russell, Lecuona)

== Performers ==
- Paul Gonsalves – tenor saxophone
- Jack Sharpe – tenor saxophone (tracks 4,7)
- Pat Smythe – piano
- Kenny Napper – bass
- Ronnie Stevenson – drums

A second tenor saxophonist joins on the melody of Village Blues and final bars of You Are Too Beautiful. The liner notes credit the second saxophonist only as "a bystander who happened to be in the studio was used, no one knew his name -- but all the boys agreed that he was indeed a real 'sharp cat,' if they ever heard one." It is speculated that this is Jackie Sharpe.
