= Dream Sequence (album) =

Studio album by Kenny Wheeler
- Released: 2003
- Recorded: September 29, 1995, January 6, 1996, January 16, 1999 and January 4, 2003
- Studio: Gateway Studios, London, England
- Genre: Jazz
- Length: 66:29
- Label: Psi psi 03.04
- Producer: Evan Parker

Kenny Wheeler chronology
Island (2003)	Dream Sequence (2003)	Where Do We Go from Here? (2004)

Dream Sequence is an album by flugelhornist and composer Kenny Wheeler recorded between 1995 and 2003 and released on Evan Parker's Psi label.

== Reception ==
Professional ratings
Review scores
Source	Rating
AllMusic	4/5 stars
All About Jazz	4.5/5 stars
The Guardian	5/5 stars
The Penguin Guide to Jazz Recordings	3.6/4 stars

The AllMusic review by Rick Anderson states, "These recordings were made over a period of seven years with a shifting group of sidemen; one track, the lovely 'Hearken,' is a solo piece, and another, the even better 'Drum Sequence,' is a duo for flügelhorn and drums. The most impressive performances, though, are those that incorporate at least a quartet into the dreamy ambience of Wheeler's musical vision. Very highly recommended".

On All About Jazz, Glenn Astarita noted, "In sum, the musicians project a velvety soundscape supplanted by warmly stated choruses and keenly articulated soloing spots. (Highly recommended...)".

The Guardian's John Fordham noted, "Kenny Wheeler, a bold trumpet player who avoids standard songs or familiar licks, is an acquired taste for some. But it doesn't take much close listening to detect a shy exuberance under his melancholy music, and a sophistication that imparts a haunting ambiguity to his themes and liberates improvisers ... As ever with Wheeler, the music is the polar opposite of in-your-face, and most of the tempos are slow to middling. But the gentle harmonies are captivating".

== Track listing ==
All compositions by Kenny Wheeler except where noted.

1. "Unti" – 13:45
2. "Drum Sequence" – 6:29
3. "Dream Sequence" – 5:11
4. "Cousin Marie" – 9:35
5. "Nonetheless" – 7:05
6. "A Flower Is a Lovesome Thing" (Billy Strayhorn) – 7:46
7. "Hearken" – 4:52
8. "Kind Folks" – 11:46

== Personnel ==
- Kenny Wheeler – flugelhorn
- Ray Warleigh – alto saxophone, flute
- Stan Sulzmann – tenor saxophone
- John Parricelli – guitar
- Chris Laurence – bass
- Tony Levin (drummer) – drums
