= Rare Paul Gonsalves Sextet in Europe =

Studio album by Paul Gonsalves
- Released: 1978
- Recorded: 1963
- Genre: Jazz
- Length: 39:24
- Label: Jazz Connoisseur

Paul Gonsalves chronology
Salt and Pepper (1963)	Rare Paul Gonsalves Sextet in Europe (1978)	Boom-Jackie-Boom-Chick (1964)

Rare Paul Gonsalves Sextet in Europe is an album recorded in 1963 by Paul Gonsalves.

== Track listing ==
1. Robins Nest
2. Angel Eyes
3. Blues
4. Blue and Sentimental
5. Mr. Gentle and Mr. Cool
6. I Can't Get Started
7. Just Friends

== Performers ==
- Paul Gonsalves - Tenor Saxophone
- Ray Nance - Trumpet / Violin / Vocal
- Rolf Ericson - Trumpet
- Otto Francker - Piano / Organ
- Jimmy Woode - Bass
- Sam Woodyard - drums
