= Island (Bob Brookmeyer and Kenny Wheeler album) =

Studio album by Kenny Wheeler, Bob Brookmeyer
- Released: August 19, 2003
- Recorded: September 27–29, 2002
- Studio: Mix One Studios, Boston, MA
- Genre: Jazz
- Length: 55:41
- Label: Artists House AH 006
- Producer: John Snyder

Kenny Wheeler chronology
A Long Time Ago (1998)	Island (2003)	Dream Sequence (2003)

Bob Brookmeyer chronology
Get Well Soon (2002)	Island (2003)	Spirit Music (2006)

Island is a studio album by Canadian musician Kenny Wheeler and trombonist Bob Brookmeyer, recorded in 2002 and released on Artist House Records in 2003.

== Reception ==
Professional ratings
Review scores
Source	Rating
Allmusic	4.5/5 stars
The Penguin Guide to Jazz Recordings	4/4 stars

The Allmusic review by Thom Jurek awarded the album 4 1/2 stars, stating: "the quintet creates a series of expansive yet pastoral jazz settings for the exploration at the margins without the edges. Make no mistake; aesthetically this is 'beautiful' and deeply moving music. The level of composition here is the highest, and the articulation of these tonal and harmonic architectures is flawless ... That this music is played with such grace, elegance, and aplomb makes it a gift to be cherished and studied".

All About Jazz correspondent Rex Butters commented: "Although they’ve not recorded together before, they set each other up and finish each other’s thoughts like a long married couple. The island in question seems more north Atlantic than Caribbean. While the program tends toward moody mid-tempo tunes, the high level of playing keeps monotony at bay ... The Brookmeyer/Wheeler collaboration shows two long time players apparently still in ascent".

== Track listing ==
All compositions by Kenny Wheeler unless otherwise noted

1. "Before the First Time" - 7:56
2. "114" - 7:29
3. "Where Do We Go From Here?" - 7:45
4. "Song for Kenny" (Brookmeyer) - 9:43
5. "Upstairs with Beatrice" (Brookmeyer) - 7:22
6. "Island" (Brookmeyer) - 9:46
7. "Strange One" - 5:40

== Personnel ==
- Kenny Wheeler - trumpet, flugelhorn
- Bob Brookmeyer - trombone
- Frank Carlberg - piano
- Jeremy Allen - bass
- John Hollenbeck - drums
