= Erik Reitzel =

Danish civil engineer (1941–2012)

Erik Reitzel (10 May 1941 – 6 February 2012) was a Danish civil engineer who started work in 1964 and was for many years a professor at the Royal Danish Academy of Fine Arts and the Technical University of Denmark, in the disciplines of bearing structures and structural design.

His research enabled him to discover the fundamental correlation between fracture, minimal structures and growth. This discovery makes it possible to obtain considerable savings in construction materials. Erik Reitzel is the author of books and articles on the outcomes of his research and their practical application.

Several prizes have been awarded to Erik Reitzel in Denmark and abroad for his research and work on architectural minimal structures, as well as for interesting and original solutions to major engineering projects. It was for this reason that he was awarded the Légion d’honneur at the request of French President François Mitterrand. In 1988 he was awarded the Nykredit Architecture Prize.

Since 1971, Erik Reitzel, in partnership with his wife Inge Reitzel, has been a consultant engineer.

== First prize projects ==
With various architects, he has participated in competitions and won several prizes, for example:

- The New Parliament (Riksdag) in Stockholm, 1972
- Grande Arche in Paris, 1983; originally planned as an International Communications Centre
- The urban plan for Husarviken, in Stockholm, 1988
- The Danish Pavilion at Expo 92 in Seville, 1989
- Copenhagen Business School, Frederiksberg, Denmark
- Västra City in Stockholm, 1997

== Realised projects ==
He has designed constructions in collaboration with various companies, cf. for example:

- Grande Arche in Paris
- The lift tower for Grande Arche
- An exhibition platform in the Louvre, Paris
- The lattice dome for Cambridge Crystallographic Data Centre
- Church at Gammel Holte (Denmark)
- The glass pyramid for the House of Industry in Copenhagen
- A spiral-shaped bridge in the Sophienholm Park, at Kongens Lyngby (Denmark)
- A greenhouse built like a meccano system at Virum (Denmark)
- The quasi crystal structure for the Technical University of Denmark
- The Symbolic Globe at UNESCO, Paris
- The royal bridge on Esrum Lake (Denmark)
- The transport over 2 kilometres of the Terminal VL 39 building from Copenhagen Airport to Maglebylille (Denmark)

== Publications ==
- The Symbolic Globe UNESCO Publishing, Paris 2006. ISBN 92-3-104028-6 and ISBN 978-92-3-104028-3
- Structural Design of tall Buildings with a minimal Risk of Collapse CIB-CTBUH Proceedings to the international conference on Tall Buildings 2003, Kuala Lumpur, Publication 290, 2003. ISBN 9834128304
- The Society seen through a Civil Engineer’s Glasses Danish Civil and Structural Science and Engineering. 2003. ISBN 8798988700
- Fra sæbebobler til store bygninger (from soap bubbles to great buildings) chapter in VIDENSKABERFREMTIDEN, Villum Kann Rasmussen Fonden og Experimentarium 2003. ISBN 8798928503
- Hur Nya Former Kan Uppstå (on designing new structures) Arkitekttidningen nr. 9, Stockholm 2001
- Les forces dont resultent quelques monuments Parisiens de la Fin du XXe siècle LE POUVOIR ET LA VILLE À L’ÉPOQUE MODERNE ET CONTEMPORAINE, Sorbonne 2001. ISBN 2747526100
- De la rupture à la structure Colloque franco-danois sur Représentation de l'espace, répartition dans l'espace - sur différentes manières d'habiter, 2000. ISBN 8798781707
- Grundtræk af Bærende Konstruktioner i Arkitekturen (Bearing structures in Architecture) together with the architect Hans Friis Mathiasen, Kunstakademiets Arkitektskoles Forlag, 1999. ISBN 8787136260
- Tectonics in Practice Communication at the European conference, Association of Collegiate Schools of Architecture, 1996
- Musikk og Konstruktjoner (Music and Structures) Article in the book: Tversnit av et Øjeblik, Oslo 1992. ISBN 8254701032
- Rupture - Structure Conférence internationale sur l'Ingénieur et l'Art, Aix-en-Provence, France, 1991
- Konkurrence om Tête Défense, Paris, og projektets videre bearbejdning (the competition on Tête Défense) Arkitekten no 23, 1984
- Le Cube ouvert. Structures and foundations International conference on tall buildings. Singapore, 1984. ISBN 9971840421
- Spild og ressourcer (waste and resources) The National Museum of Denmark, 1980. ISBN 8748002763
- Fra brud til form (From Fracture to Form) Polyteknisk Forlag, 1979. ISBN 8750204939
- Tusindårig tradition (about the church of Gammel Holte) Ingeniøren no 49,1978
- Energi, boliger, byggeri together with the architect Hans Friis Mathiasen, Fremad 1975. ISBN 8755705995
- Om materialeøkonomiske konstruktioner og brudlinier (minimal structures and fracture lines) Bygningsstatiske meddelelser no 2, 1975
- Materialeøkonomiske Konstruktioner (Minimal Structures), Arkitekten no 21, 1971

== Film ==
- The Invisible Forces (55 minutes) producer: JJ – Film. Premiere in Paris 2002, arte 2006
- La Sonate de la Rupture (7 minutes) producer: JJ-Film, 2000
