= The Cook, the Thief, His Wife & Her Lover (soundtrack) =

The Cook The Thief His Wife & Her Lover

Soundtrack album from The Cook The Thief His Wife & Her Lover by Michael Nyman
- Released: 30 October 1989
- Genre: Contemporary classical music, film score, minimalist music
- Length: 40:26
- Language: English
- Label: Virgin Venture, Caroline
- Producer: David Cunningham

Michael Nyman chronology
La Traversée de Paris (1989)	The Cook The Thief His Wife & Her Lover (1989)	Out of the Ruins (1989)

Professional ratings
Review scores
Source	Rating
Allmusic	4.5/5 stars

The Cook The Thief His Wife & Her Lover is the twelfth album release by Michael Nyman and the ninth to feature the Michael Nyman Band. It is the soundtrack to the eponymous film by Peter Greenaway. The album includes the first commercially released recording of Memorial (Greenaway heard a radio recording of the original performance that has not been commercially released), and this is the only piece discussed in the liner notes, to the point that the lyric sheet for "Miserere" (based on Psalm 51), the song which Pup the kitchen boy sings, is misidentified "Memorial." "Book Depository" is one of Nyman's many waltzes.

== Composition ==
Nyman does not here identify the origin of Memorial as a bass ground from Henry Purcell's King Arthur, but he does so elsewhere, including on After Extra Time. The liner notes primarily note the 1985 Heysel Stadium disaster that occurred during the work's composition and became what the work was about and a discussion of the premiere of the work in a disused nuclear power plant in Yainville before Paul Richards's painting, The Kiss, and its ultimate "dismantling," preventing it from being used to commemorate the 1989 Hillsborough disaster.

There is some music in the film that is not included on the soundtrack album: the love theme for Michael and Georgina, which is "Fish Beach" from Drowning by Numbers, the song ("Something Sometime Soon") performed as a show in the restaurant, and sung by singer and actress Flavia Brilli, or a doubly pulsed variation of Memorial that occurs about halfway through the film. Edits of "Memorial" appear throughout the film, with the entire twelve-minute movement accompanying the final scene and end credits, but one variation is uniquely created for the film.

== Track listing ==
1. "Memorial" – 12:07
2. "Miserere Paraphrase" – 5:44
3. "Book Depository" – 5:41
4. "Coupling" – 5:17
5. "Miserere" – 11:32

== Personnel ==
Memorial, "Book Depository," and "Coupling" performed by the Michael Nyman Band:

- Alexander Balanescu, violin
- Elisabeth Perry, violin
- Jonathan Carney, violin/viola
- Tony Hinnigan, cello
- Chris Laurence (misspelled "Lawrence"), double bass
- David Fuest, clarinet/bass clarinet
- John Harle, soprano/alto sax
- David Roach, alto sax
- Andrew Findon, tenor/baritone sax/flute
- Graham Ashton, trumpet
- David Stewart, trombone
- Michael Nyman, piano, conductor
- Sarah Leonard, soprano

"Miserere Paraphrase" performed by Alexander Balanescu (violin) and Michael Nyman (piano)

"Miserere" performed by London Voices, director Terry Edwards

- Paul Chapman: boy soprano
- Elisabeth Harrison
- Judith Rees
- Sue Anderson
- Sarah Leonard
- Lesley Reid
- Doreen Walker
- Gareth Roberts
- Terry Edwards
- Simon Davies
- Gordon Jones
- Geoffrey Shaw
- Produced by David Cunningham
- Recorded and Mixed at PRT Studios
- Engineer: Michael J. Dutton
- Assistant Engineer: Dillon Gallagher
- "Miserere" recorded at Marcus Studio
- Engineer: Tim Hunt
- Mixed at Lansdowne Studios
- Engineer: Michael J. Dutton
- Assistant Engineer: Marsten Bailey
- Representative to Michael Nyman: Tony Simons
