= Chris Laurence =

English double bassist

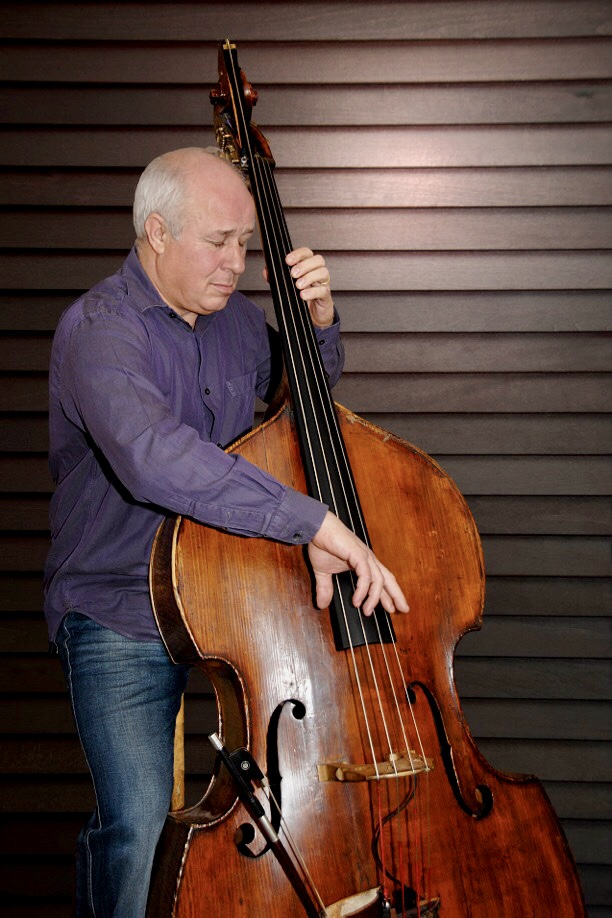
- Chris Laurence

Background information
- Born: 6 January 1949 (age 77); London, England
- Genres: Jazz; classical
- Occupation: Musician
- Instrument: Double bass

Chris Laurence (born 6 January 1949) is an English musician. Born in London, he studied at the Guildhall School of Music and Drama, and primarily works with jazz and classical music. In the classical world he was principal double bass with the Academy of St Martin in the Fields orchestra until 1995, playing on many of their recordings ranging from the film Amadeus to Benjamin Britten's Curlew River. He has recorded with many jazz artists, including trombonist J. J. Johnson, Tony Coe, Joe Williams, Sarah Vaughan, Clark Terry, Johnny Mathis, and Lena Horne. His most recent recordings include John Surman's The Spaces in Between (2007), Kenny Wheeler's The Long Waiting (2012) and Songs for Quintet on ECM Records, and Norma Winstone's Manhattan in the Rain (1998). He has also recorded music for television, film, and albums, most notably Leaving Las Vegas (1995), Ken Loach's Looking for Eric (2009), The Constant Gardener (2005), Howard Shore's score for Hugo (2011), and most recently was featured on the soundtrack of Mike Leigh's Mr. Turner (2014). In 2007, he recorded a CD with his own jazz quartet titled New View, released on the Basho label along with Frank Ricotti (vibes), John Parricelli (guitar), Martin France (drums), and featuring Norma Winstone (vocals).

As well as jazz and classical music, Laurence has also featured on albums with many stars including Elton John, Sting, Peter Gabriel, Mary Chapin Carpenter, Joni Mitchell, David Gilmour, Michel Legrand, and guitarist John Williams.

== Select discography ==
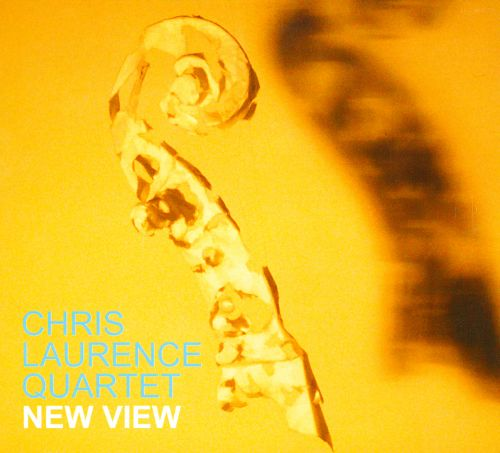
Chris Laurence Quartet, New View, 2007

Chris Laurence Quartet (As leader)

- New View (Basho) (2007)
- Some Gnu Ones, Jazzin Britain (2021)

With David Gilmour

- On an Island (Columbia)
- Rattle That Lock (Columbia)

With Barry Guy/The London Jazz Composers' Orchestra

- Ode (Incus, 1972)

With Michael Nyman

- The Cook The Thief His Wife & Her Lover (Virgin Venture)
- The End of the Affair (Sony Classical)
- Six Celan Songs/The Ballad of Kastriot Rexhepi (MN)
- Love Counts (MN)
- À la folie (Virgin Venture)

With Emily Rose Laurence

- Relativity (2022)

With Alan Skidmore

- T.C.B. (Philips)
- El Skid w/ Elton Dean

With John Surman

- Morning Glory
- The Brass Project (ECM, 1992)
- Stranger than Fiction (ECM, 1995)
- Coruscating (ECM, 1999)
- The Spaces in Between (ECM, 2006)

With John Taylor

- Pause, and Think Again (Turtle)
- Decipher (MPS)

With Kenny Wheeler

- Kayak (Ah Um, Ah Um )
- Dream Sequence (Psi, 1995-2003 [2003])
- Songs for Quintet (ECM, 2013 [2015])
- Six for Six (Cam Jazz)
- The Long Waiting

With Brian Miller

- Whatever Next? (2015)

With John Horler

- Not A Cloud In The Sky (2010)

With David Forman

- Like A Rainbow (2022)

Fiachra Trench

- Essential Classics (1989)

With Gareth Williams

- Short Stories (2022)

With Stan Sultzman

- On Loan With Gratitude (2023)

With Frank Ricotti Quartet

- Our Point of View (CBS)
- Frank Ricotti Stars (Beiderbecke Collection, 1988)

With Gordon Beck

- Once Is Never Enough (FMR)

With John Williams

- The Magic Box (Sony Classical)

With Elton Dean

- They All Be on This Old Road (Ogun)

With the Academy of St. Martin in the Fields

- Curlew River
- Amadeus
- Messiah, (Live In Dublin)

With Tony Coe

- Nutty on Wilisa
- Les Sources Bleues Camomil
- Mainly Mancini

With Lena Horne

- A New Album

With Sarah Vaughn

- The Gold Collection: Sings the Poetry of Pope John Paul II

With Harry Beckett

- Warm Smiles
- Flare Up

With Maurice Andrea/ Michel Legrand

- Windmills

With Geoff Eales

- Master of the Game
- Transience

With Debbie Wiseman, Locrian Ensemble

- Wolf Hall

With Johnnie Mathis

- In a Sentimental Mood

With Norma Winstone

- Manhattan in the Rain
- Edge of Time

With Mike de Albuquerque

- We May Be Castle but We All Have Names
- First Wind

With Peter Gabriel

- Scratch My Back (New Blood Orchestra)
- New Blood (New Blood Orchestra)
- Live Blood (New Blood Orchestra)
- i/o (New Blood Orchestra)
- o\i (New Blood Orchestra)

With Gil Evans

- Absolute Beginners
- Having It All
- Va Va Voom
- Insignificance

With John Warren

- Travellers Tale

With Mike Figgis

- Leaving Las Vegas

With Anja Garbarek

- Smiling and Waving

With Brigitte Baraha

- Babelfish
- Chasing Rainbows
- Once Upon A Tide

With Helen Jane Long

- Intervention

With Michel Legrand

- Radio Days

With Robert Farnon

- Carol Kidd, A Place in My Heart
- Jose Careres, Love Is (1984)
- Jane Pickles, Hey There (Vocalion)
- JJ Johnson, Tangence
- Joe Williams, Here's To Life
- Eileen Farrell, Love Is Letting Go

With Elton John

- Madman Across The Water
- Tumbleweed Connection

With Joni Mitchell

- Both Sides Now
- Travelogue

With Clark Terry

- Clark After Dark

With Guy Barker

- Holly

With Joe Douglas Trio

- Visage (Spotlight Records, 1979)

With Michael Garrick/ Don Weller

- You've Changed (1978)

With The Mike Westbrook Concert Band

- Metropolis (Citadel 315)

With Neil Ardley

- Symphony of Amarantis

With Andy Sheppard

- Dancing Man & Woman
- Learning to Wave

With Alan Davie

- Bird Through The Wall

With Alison Moyet

- Voice

With Elvis Costello

- Il Sogno (Ballet)

With Mark Hollis

- Mark Hollis (Polydor)

With Zizi Possi

- Per Amore

With Dick Walter

- Capricorn Rising

With the London Trombone Quartet

- Some of Our Best Friends

With Michael Civisca

- Love is Like a Breeze

With Beryl Cook

- Live From London

With Morrissey

- He Knows I'd Love to See Him (His Master's Voice, 1990)

With Gerd Dudek

- 'Smatter (Psi, 1998 [2002])

== Soundtracks ==
- Amadeus – Peter Shaffer
- Mr. Turner – Gary Yershon
- Leaving Las Vegas – Anthony Marinelli and Mike Figgis
- Hugo – Howard Shore
- Looking for Eric – George Fenton
- The Constant Gardener – Alberto Iglesias and Robert Church
- Shaun the Sheep Movie – Ilan Eshkeri
- The Man Who Cried – Kronos Quartet
- Tim's Vermeer – Conrad Pope
- The Duke- George Fenton
