= Shandong Grand Theater =

Opera house in Jinan, Shandong Province

Coordinates: 36.6680°N 116.9028°E

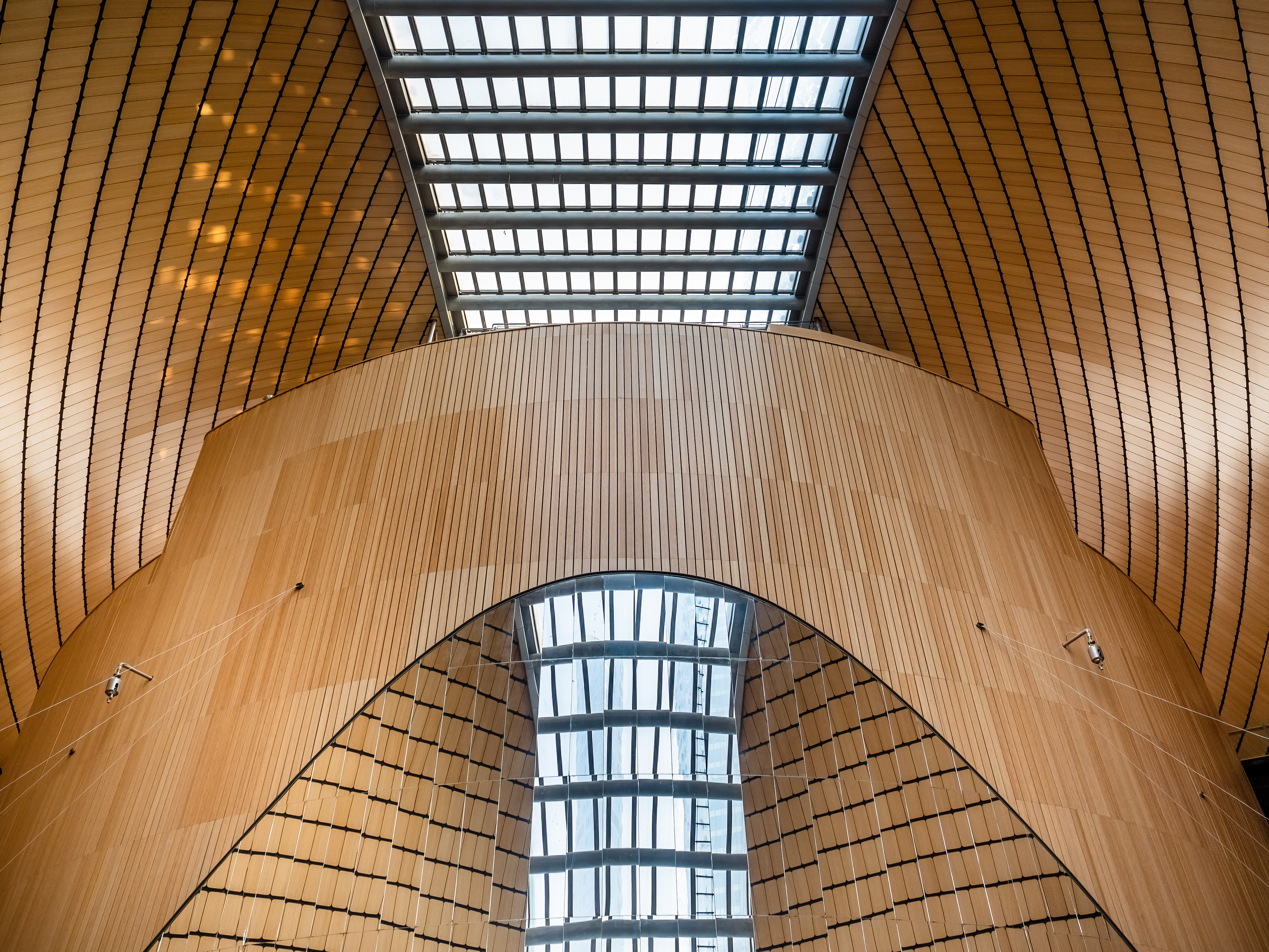
Interior of the theater

The Shandong Grand Theater, also known as Jinan Opera, is a opera house located in Jinan, Shandong Province, People's Republic of China. Designed by Paul Andreu, its construction began on October 22, 2010, and it commenced operations on October 9, 2013. The venue includes an opera hall, a concert hall, and a multifunctional hall with a total area of 75,000 square meters.
