= Songs for Quintet =

Studio album by Kenny Wheeler
- Released: January 13, 2015
- Recorded: December 2013
- Studios: Abbey Road Studios; London, England
- Genre: Jazz
- Length: 52:10
- Label: ECM 2388
- Producers: Manfred Eicher and Steve Lake

Kenny Wheeler chronology
| Six for Six (2013) | Songs for Quintet (2015) |

Songs for Quintet is the final studio album by flugelhornist and composer Kenny Wheeler recorded at Abbey Road Studios in 2013 and released on the ECM label in early 2015 shortly after his death. The quintet features saxophonist Stan Sulzmann, guitarist John Parricelli, and rhythm section Chris Laurence and Martin France.

== Reception ==
Professional ratings
Review scores
| Source | Rating |
|---|---|
| AllMusic | 4/5 stars |
| PopMatters | 8/10 stars |
| All About Jazz | 4/5 stars |
| The Guardian | 4/5 stars |

The AllMusic review by Matt Collar states "Ultimately, Songs for Quintet is a beautiful and poignantly subtle farewell from one of the quiet giants of jazz."

PopMatters's John Garratt said "Wheeler’s final album shows the 84-year-old legend making music the same way he always had—with class, mood and spontaneity. And if Wheeler’s declining health at the time impacted his playing in any way, Songs for Quintet show it to be a remarkable non-factor. If someone can pull off an album like this while they’re dying, then there’s hope for us all."

All About Jazz reviewers said, "Songs for Quintet is a poignant closing statement from the great, highly influential Kenny Wheeler. His playing, though somewhat reduced, still captivates but like all his vehicles he led over forty five years the music's strength lies in the writing for the ensemble. A grower, Songs for Quintet marks a dignified and soulful final chapter in the stellar career of a unique figure" and "It's impossible to know if Wheeler knew his days on earth were truly numbered, but with Songs for Quintet another legend may now have passed, but not before delivering an album that's not just as good a swan song as anyone could hope for, but a recording that stands amongst the rest of his discography as one of his absolute finest."

The Guardian's John Fordham said "Following the widespread tributes to Wheeler’s freethinking virtuosity, it would be all too easy to cheer his swansong—but his sound does retain much of its old melancholy tenderness here, and in the context of this set’s beautiful pieces and elegant improvisation, some hesitant flugelhorn moments mostly just reinforce the hypnotic humanity of the music."

== Track listing ==
All compositions by Kenny Wheeler.

1. "Seventy-Six" - 5:02
2. "Jigsaw" - 8:44
3. "The Long Waiting" - 5:10
4. "Canter No. 1" - 6:40
5. "Sly Eyes" - 8:07
6. "1076" - 2:40
7. "Old Time" - 6:12
8. "Pretty Liddle Waltz" - 6:49
9. "Nonetheless" - 4:52

== Personnel ==
- Kenny Wheeler – flugelhorn
- Stan Sulzmann – tenor saxophone
- John Parricelli – guitar
- Chris Laurence – bass
- Martin France – drums
