= John Parricelli =

English jazz guitarist

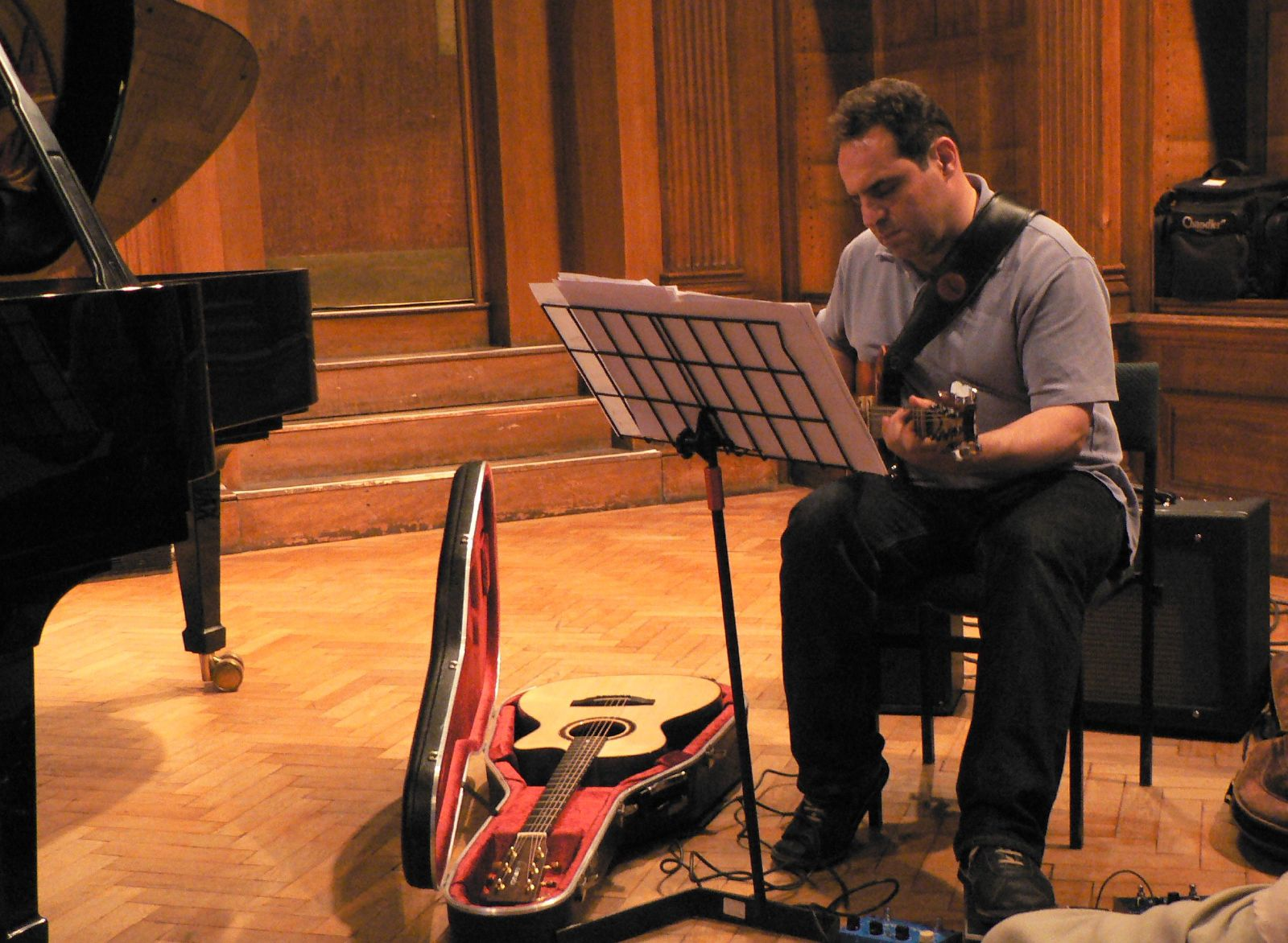
Parricelli in 2007

John Parricelli (born 5 April 1959 in Evesham, Wychavon, Worcestershire, England) is a jazz guitarist who has worked mainly in the United Kingdom.

Parricelli began his career as a guitarist in 1982. He was one of the founding members of the British big band Loose Tubes, with whom he recorded three albums. He has worked with Annie Whitehead, Kenny Wheeler, Norma Winstone, Lee Konitz, Paul Motian, Chris Laurence, Peter Erskine, Vince Mendoza, Julian Argüelles, Iain Ballamy, Mark Lockheart, Andy Sheppard, Gerard Presencer, Colin Towns, and Stacey Kent.

In 2011, he appeared on stage with Peter Erskine and John Paul Jones at the Royal Opera House, London, in the opera Anna Nicole.

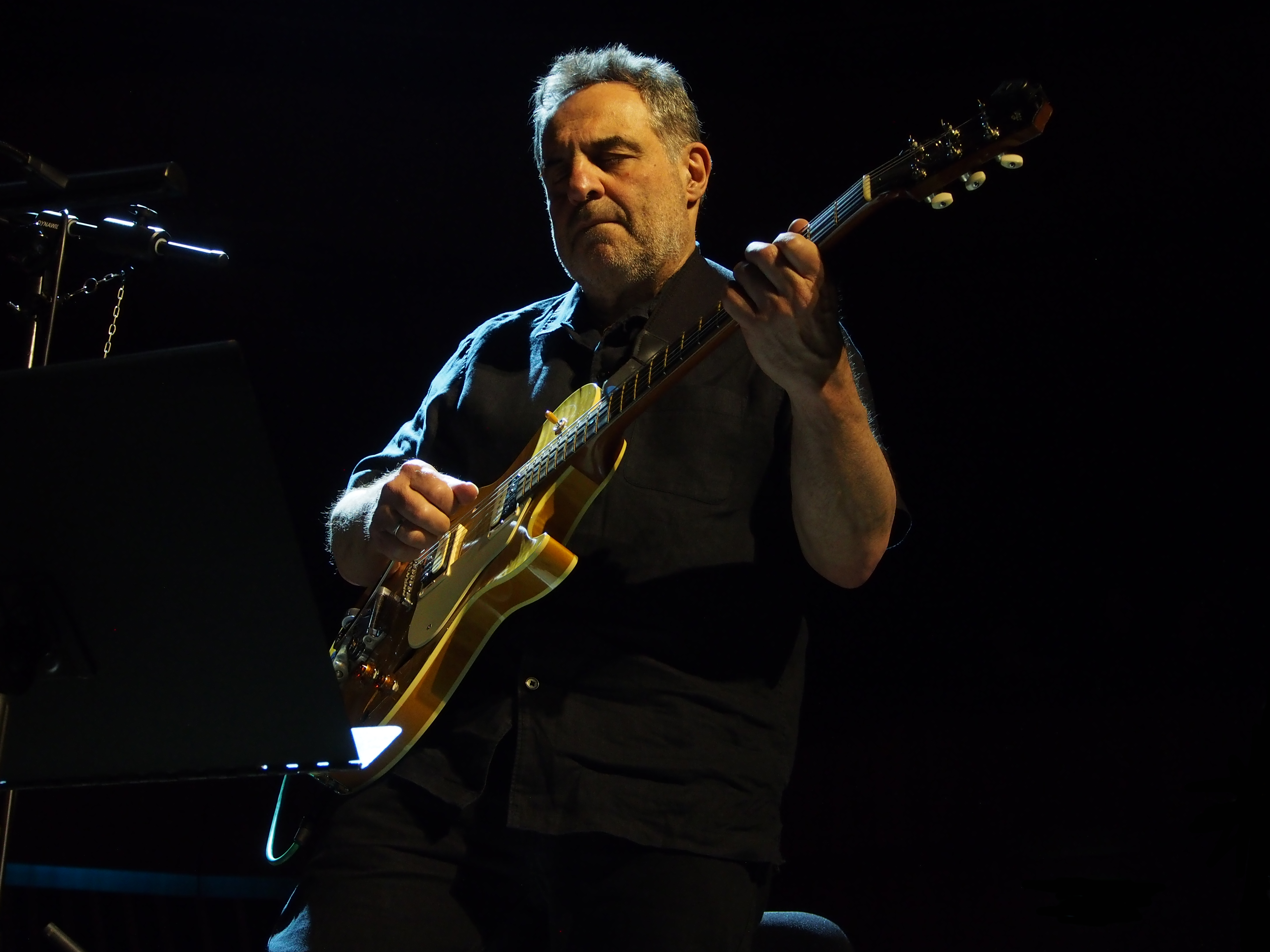
Photo of Parricelli in 2026 at Bielska Zadymka Jazzowa

== Discography ==
With Gary Barlow

- Since I Saw You Last (Polydor, 2013)

With Emma Bunton

- Free Me (19, 2004)

With Toni Braxton

- Pulse (Atlantic, 2010)

With Charlotte Church

- Enchantment (Columbia, 2001)

With Jamie Cullum

- Twentysomething (Verve, 2003)

With Lars Danielsson

- Tarantella (ACT, 2009)
- Liberetto (ACT, 2012)
- Liberetto II (ACT, 2014)
- Liberetto III (ACT, 2017)
- Cloudland (ACT, 2021)
- Trio (ACT, 2024)

With Gerd Dudek

- 'Smatter (Psi, 2002)

With Duffy

- Endlessly (Mercury, 2010)

With David Gilmour

- Rattle That Lock (Columbia, 2015)

With Ronan Keating

- Winter Songs (Polydor, 2009)

With Leona Lewis

- Spirit (J, 2007)

With Katie Melua

- Pictures (Dramatico, 2007)
- Secret Symphony (Dramatico, 2012)
- Ketevan (Dramatico, 2013)

With Rumer

- Boys Don't Cry (Atlantic, 2012)

With Seal

- Standards (Decca, 2017)

With Andy Sheppard

- Learning to Wave (Provocateur, 1998)
- Dancing Man and Woman (Provocateur, 2000)
- P.S. (Provocateur, 2003)
- Movements in Colour (ECM, 2009)

With Colin Towns

- Still Life (Provocateur, 1998)
- Another Think Coming (Provocateur, 2001)
- The Orpheus Suite (Provocateur, 2004)

With Mark Lockheart

- Days on Earth (Edition, 2019)
- Smiling (Edition, 2024)

With Judie Tzuke

- Wonderland (Essential, 1992)

With Russell Watson

- Encore (Decca, 2001)

With Kenny Wheeler

- A Long Time Ago (ECM, 1997)
- Dream Sequence (Psi, 2003)
- It Takes Two! (CAM Jazz, 2006)
- Songs for Quintet (ECM, 2015)

With Robbie Williams

- Swings Both Ways (Island, 2013)
