= Johan Otto von Spreckelsen =

Danish architect (1929–1987)

The Grande Arche in Puteaux - his best-known design.

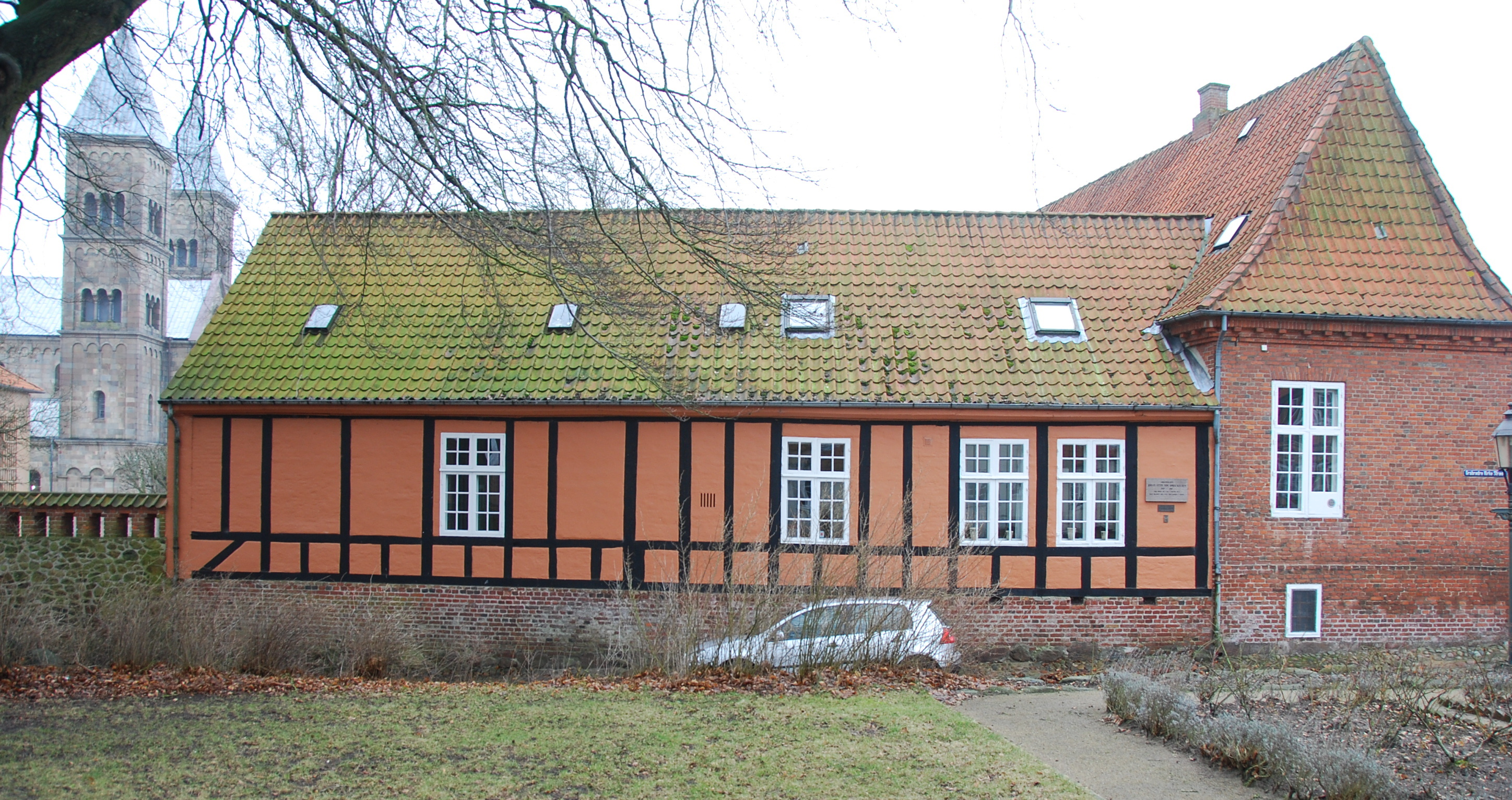
Spreckelsen's childhood home in Viborg

Johan Otto von Spreckelsen (4 May 1929 – 16 March 1987) was a Danish architect, best known for designing the Grande Arche of La Défense in Puteaux, near Paris. He directed the creation of several modern churches in Denmark.

== Life ==
He was born in Viborg and studied at the Viborg Katedralskole and Royal Academy of Arts in Copenhagen. He later became associate professor at the Academy and from 1978 he was professor at the Academy of Fine Arts, School of Architecture. He later served as director up to the time of his death.

== Churches ==
He directed the creation of several modern churches in Denmark: Vangede Kirke near Copenhagen (1974), Stavnsholt Kirke at the city of Farum (1981) and two Roman Catholic churches including one in Esbjerg (1969), St Nikolaj Church, and Hvidovre (1960), also consecrated to Saint Nicholas.

He was modest about his accomplishments. Once in an interview, he declared that he was an architect who built three churches and a house. He relied heavily on simple geometrical figures, especially the quadrant, which can be seen in his churches, in the interior decorations even of church organs.

== La Défense ==
His design won the international competition of the Grande Arche in Puteaux, France, as the French President François Mitterrand felt it was the best because of its 'purity and strength'. This work of 110 meters of height, which was inaugurated in 1989, two years after his death, used with remarkable ability the technology of its time, and was inspired by the nearby Arc de Triomphe. The monument, located in the heart of the financial district of La Défense, is built of granite and of Carrara marble. From its terrace, it is possible to admire a panoramic view all along the Axe historique with the Arc de Triomphe, the Champs-Élysées, the Luxor Obelisk at the Place de la Concorde and the gardens of the Tuileries and the Louvre beyond.

== Personal life ==
In 1955, he was married to Karen Gerda Gustavsen. Johan Otto von Spreckelsen died in 1987 of cancer and was buried at Hørsholm Kirkegård.

== Legacy ==
He was portrayed by Claes Bang in the 2025 film The Great Arch (L'inconnu de la Grande Arche).

== Gallery ==
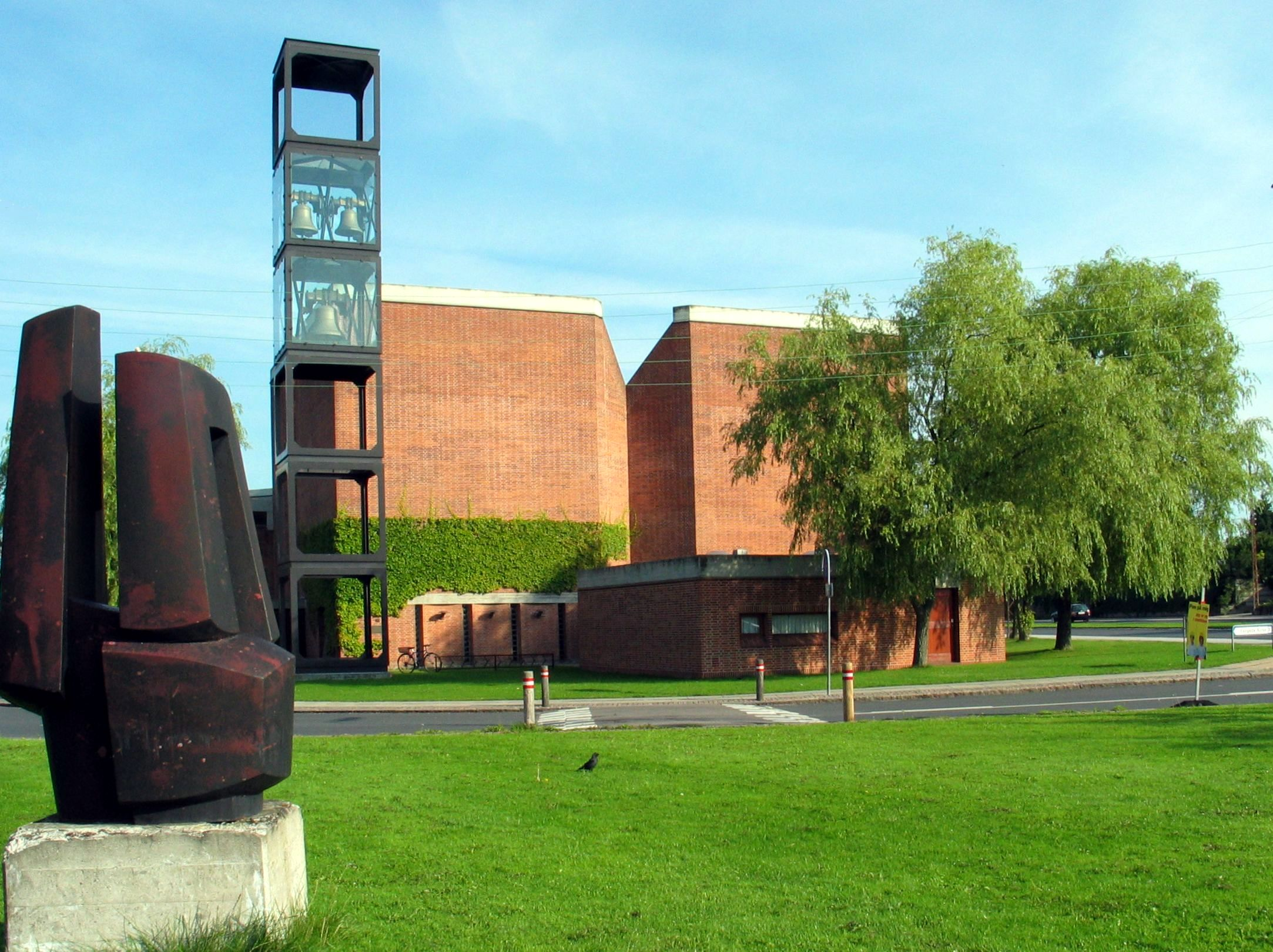
Vangede Kirke

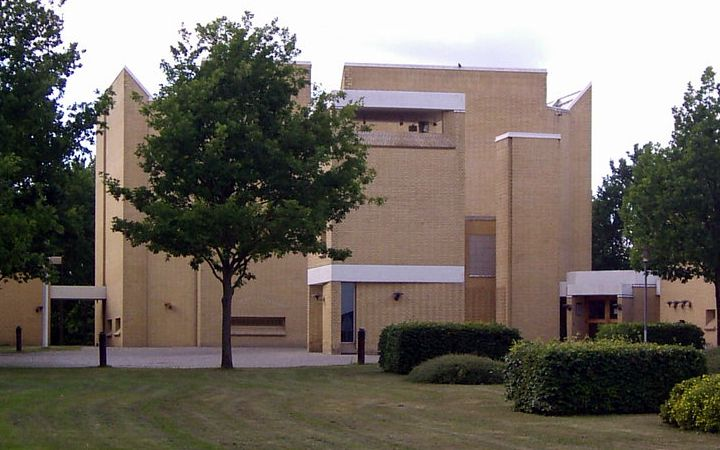
Stavnsholt Kirke

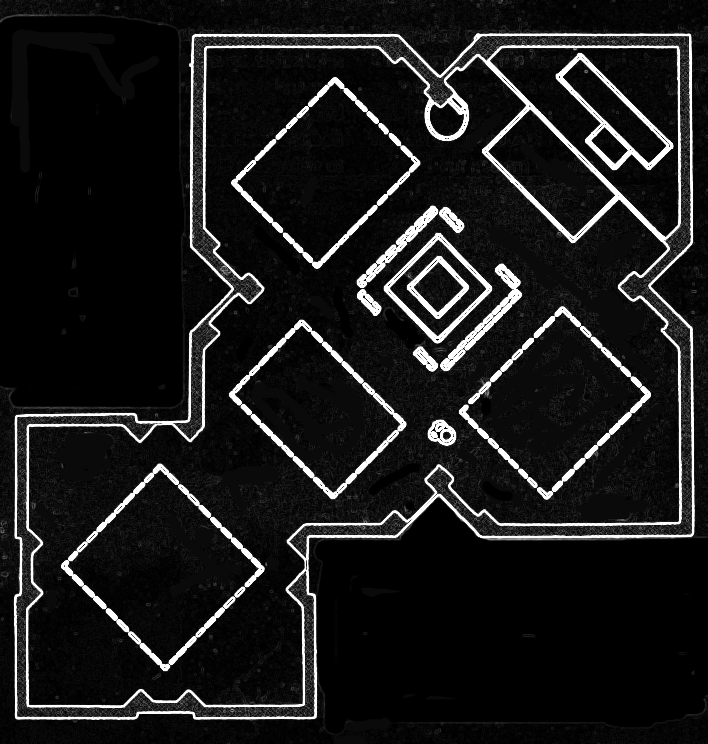
Vangede plan

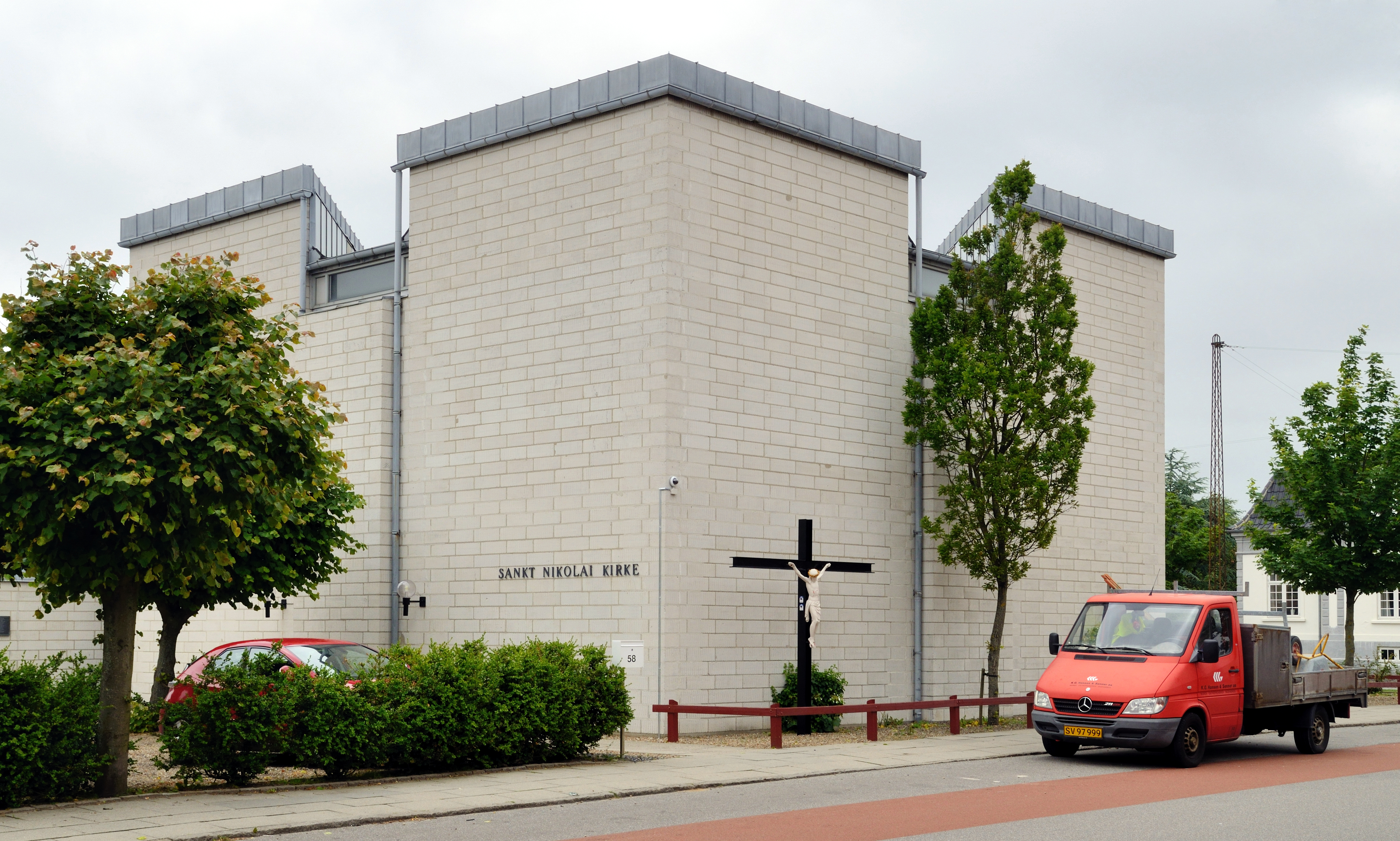
St Nikolaj, Esbjerg

== Other sources ==
- Torben Weirup (ed.) (2003) Det Åbne Vindue, et essay om arkitekten Johan Otto von Spreckelsen (Charlottenlund: Luga) ISBN 87-985316-3-8
