= Stan Sulzmann =

- Born: Stanley Ernest Sulzmann; 30 November 1948 (age 77); London, England
- Genres: Jazz
- Occupation: Musician
- Instrument: Saxophone
- Years active: 1964–present

Stanley Ernest Sulzmann (born 30 November 1948) is an English jazz saxophonist.

== Biography ==
He was born in London, England.

Sulzmann began playing the saxophone aged 13 and played in 1964 Bill Ashton's London Youth Jazz Orchestra, later the National Youth Jazz Orchestra. He studied at the Royal Academy of Music from 1969 to 1972. In the 1970s, he played with the Clarke-Boland Big Band (1971), Mike Gibbs (1971), John Taylor and Kenny Wheeler, Volker Kriegel, Eberhard Weber, Zbigniew Seifert (1973), Phil Woods (1978), Clark Terry (1978), and Gordon Beck. In the 1980s, he worked with Gil Evans (1983), Paul McCartney (1987), the European Jazz Ensemble (1983), the James Last Orchestra, the Hilversum Radio Orchestra, the Hamburg-based NDR Big Band, and the London Jazz Orchestra. Collaborations in the 1990s include with Allan Botschinsky, David Murray (1997), Paul Clarvis (1998), and Bruno Castellucci (1998). Television audiences around the world have heard him as the saxophone soloist in "The Belgian Detective", the theme music to ITV's Poirot, composed by Christopher Gunning.

Sulzmann has held teaching positions at the Guildhall School of Music, the Royal Academy of Music, and Trinity College of Music.

== Discography ==
=== As leader ===
- On Loan with Gratitude (Mosaic, 1977)
- Krark with Tony Hymas, (Mosaic, 1979)
- Illusions with Winds of Change (EMI, 1979)
- Everybody's Song but My Own with John Taylor (Loose Tubes, 1987)
- Aspects of Paragonne with Aspects of Paragonne (MMC, 1987)
- Feudal Rabbits (Ah Um, 1991)
- Never at All with Marc Copland (FMR, 1992)
- Creative Sound Pictures (KPM Music, 1994)
- Treasure Trove with Nikki Iles (Asc, 1996)
- Bubbling Under with Sonia Slany, Tony Hymas (Village Life, 1998)
- Birthdays, Birthdays (Village Life, 1999)
- Ordesa with John Parricelli, Kenny Wheeler (Symbol, 2002)
- Jigsaw (Basho, 2004)
- Catch Me with Neon Quartet (Edition, 2010)
- Subjekt with Neon Quartet (Edition, 2012)
- Star Dust with Nikki Iles (Jellymould, 2015)
- Double Exposure with John Taylor (InVersion 2016)

=== As sideman ===
With Gordon Beck

- Seven Steps to Evans (MPS, 1980)
- Celebration (JMS, 1985)
- A Tribute to Bill Evans (VideoArts, 1991)
- Once Is Never Enough (FMR, 1996)
- November Song (JMS, 1999)

With Chet Baker

- Legacy (Enja, 1995)

With European Jazz Ensemble

- At the Philharmonic Cologne (MA Music, 1989)
- Meets the Khan Family (MA Music, 1992)
- 20th Anniversary Tour (Konnex, 1997)
- 25th Anniversary (Konnex, 2002)
- 30th Anniversary Tour 2006 (Konnex, 2009)
- 35th Anniversary Tour 2011 (Konnex, 2011)

With James Last

- Hansimania (Polydor, 1981)
- Plus (Polydor, 1986)
- Berlin Concert (Polydor, 1987)

With Michael Gibbs

- Tanglewood 63 (Deram, 1971)
- Just Ahead (Polydor, 1972)
- Directs the Only Chrome-Waterfall Orchestra (Bronze, 1975)

With Tony Hymas

- Insight (KPM Music, 1986)
- Flying Fortress (nato, 1988)
- Oyate (nato, 1990)

With Kenny Wheeler

- Flutter By, Butterfly (Soul Note, 1988)
- Music for Large and Small Ensembles (ECM, 1990)
- Kayak (Ah Um, 1992)
- Dream Sequence (Psi, 2003)
- Dream Sequence (Psi, 2003)
- The Long Waiting (CAM Jazz, 2012)
- Six for Six (CAM Jazz, 2013)
- Songs for Quintet (ECM, 2015)

With others

- Neil Ardley, Kaleidoscope of Rainbows (Gull, 1976)
- Neil Ardley, Mike Taylor Remembered (Trunk, 2007)
- Julian Arguelles, As Above So Below (Provocateur, 2003)
- Alan Barnes, The Sherlock Holmes Suite (Rough Trade, 2003)
- Belle and Sebastian, Dear Catastrophe Waitress (Rough Trade, 2003)
- Belle and Sebastian, I'm a Cuckoo (Rough Trade, 2004)
- John Cervantes, Live at The Forge (Emmanuel Records, 2010) - featured guest soloist
- Richard Rodney Bennett, Way Ahead of the Game/Lyrics of Johnny Mercer (Black Box 2003)
- Matt Bianco, Matt Bianco (WEA, 1986)
- Matt Bianco, Samba in Your Casa (EastWest, 1991)
- Chris Botti, When I Fall in Love (Columbia, 2004)
- Gavin Bryars, After the Requiem (ECM, 1991)
- Cerrone, Cerrone IV (Malligator, 1978)
- Cerrone, Love Ritual: Glamorous Lounge Selection (Malligator, 2008)
- Karen Cheryl, Karen Cheryl (Ibach, 1978)
- Paul Clarvis, Stan Sulzmann, Tony Hymas, For All the Saints (Village Life, 1997)
- Rosemary Clooney, Nice to Be Around (United Artists, 1977)
- Graham Collier, Down Another Road (Fontana, 1969)
- Dominique Dalcan, Ostinato (Island, 1998)
- Jacqui Dankworth, First Cry
- John Dankworth, Full Circle (Philips, 1972)
- John Dankworth, Lifeline (Philips, 1973)
- Delegation, Eau De Vie (Arabella, 1979)
- Delegation, Delegation (Ariola, 1981)
- Design, Time Out (GBW, 2003)
- Gil Evans, The British Orchestra (Mole Jazz, 1983)
- Georgie Fame, Seventh Son (CBS, 1969)
- Martyn Ford, Smoovin (Vertigo, 1976)
- Mo Foster, Southern Reunion (In-Akustik, 1991)
- Stan Getz & Francy Boland/Kenny Clarke, Change of Scenes (Verve, 1998)
- God Help the Girl, God Help the Girl (Matador, 2009)
- Gordon Giltrap, Perilous Journey (Electric Record Co., 1977)
- Christopher Gunning, Agatha Christie's Poirot (Virgin, 1992)
- Christopher Gunning, Wild Africa (BBC, 2001)
- Engelbert Humperdinck, A Lovely Way to Spend an Evening (High Grade, 1987)
- Nikki Iles, Veils (Symbol, 2003)
- Grace Jones, Slave to the Rhythm (Island, 1985)
- Grace Jones, Private Life (Island, 1998)
- Tom Jones, At This Moment (Jive 1989)
- Grace Kennedy, Desire (DJM, 1979)
- Tony Kinsey, Jazz Scenes (Chappell 1993)
- Volker Kriegel, Lift! (MPS, 1973)
- London Symphony Orchestra, Classic Rock The Living Years (CBS, 1989)
- The Manhattan Transfer, Live (Atlantic, 1978)
- Tina May, A Wing and a Prayer (33 Jazz 2006)
- Paul McCartney, Give My Regards to Broad Street (Parlophone 1984)
- Memphis Slim, Blue Memphis (Warner Bros., 1970)
- Mezzoforte, Forward Motion (BHM, 2004)
- Dominic Miller, November (Q-Rious, 2010)
- Joni Mitchell, Both Sides Now (Reprise, 2000)
- Van Morrison, Avalon Sunset (Polydor, 1989)
- The Movies, Double (AGTO 1977)
- Jim Mullen, Smokescreen (Diving Duck, 2006)
- Jimmy Nail, Crocodile Shoes II (EastWest, 1996)
- National Youth Jazz Orchestra, National Youth Jazz Orchestra (Philips, 1971)
- Liam Noble, In the Meantime (Basho,)
- Barbara Pennington, Out of the Darkest Night (Record Shack, 1985)
- John Parricelli, Sixties Groove Jazz (West One Music 2008)
- Jean-François Pauvros, Hamster Attack (nato 1987)
- Ph.D., Ph.D. (WEA, 1981)
- Royal Philharmonic Orchestra, Passing Open Windows (Sony, 1996)
- Gwilym Simcock, Perception (Basho, 2007)
- Skank, Velocia (Sony, 2014)
- Spirogyra, Bells Boots and Shambles (Brain/Metronome 1973)
- John Surman, Tales of the Algonquin (Deram, 1971)
- John Taylor, Pause and Think Again (Turtle, 1971)
- John Taylor, Piano Expressions (KPM Music, 1991)
- Clark Terry, Clark After Dark Terry (MPS, 1978)
- Evelyn Thomas, Have a Little Faith in Me (AVI, 1979)
- Evelyn Thomas, Standing at the Crossroads (Record Shack, 1986)
- Piet Veerman, Back to You (Trent 1980)
- Wet Wet Wet, 10 (Mercury 1997)
- Jaki Whitren, Raw But Tender (Epic, 1973)
- Andy Williams, Close Enough for Love (Atco, 1986)
- Robbie Williams, Swing When You're Winning (Chrysalis, 2001)
- Phil Woods, I Remember (Gryphon 1979)
- Phil Woods, Floresta Canto (BMG/RCA 2006)
- Momoe Yamaguchi, Golden Flight (CBS/Sony, 1977)

== Other sources ==
- Mark Gilbert, "Stan Sulzmann". Grove Jazz online.
- Glasser, Brain (April 2008). "Don't look back in anger". Jazzwise (118). London: Jazzwise Publication Ltd: 40–41.
