= Dave Stewart (trombonist) =

Freelance bass trombonist

- Born: David Stewart; Glasgow, Scotland
- Genres: Classical
- Instruments: Bass trombone

David Stewart is a British freelance bass trombonist, and music teacher based in London.

== Early life ==
Stewart was born in Glasgow, Scotland, and studied with Peter Gane at the Guildhall School of Music and Drama in London. He was also a member of the National Youth Orchestra.

== Career ==
Stewart was the winner of the 1983 Shell/LSO brass competition and has been a member of the Academy of St Martin in the Fields and London Philharmonic Orchestra (1998–2005). He also performs with London Brass.

Often seen in the commercial and recording world, Stewart has worked with Quincy Jones, Kenny Wheeler, Mike Gibbs, John Surman and Natalie Cole. His film credits include Lord of the Rings (complete), the last five James Bond films, The Golden Compass, and The Chronicles of Narnia: Prince Caspian.

Stewart has played in The Sound of Music in London's West End since it opened in November 2006. He has also played for many others including Robbie Williams, Elton John, Annie Lennox, Joni Mitchell, S Club 7 and S Club Juniors.

Stewart played in the 25th anniversary The Phantom of the Opera performance at the Royal Albert Hall.

He also teaches bass trombone at the Royal College of Music and the Guildhall School of Music and Drama, London.
