= Jamie Talbot =

British saxophonist (born 1960)

James Robert Talbot (born 23 April 1960 in London) is an English jazz alto saxophonist.

Talbot played with the London Schools Symphony Orchestra and then with the National Youth Jazz Orchestra. He attended the Royal College of Music during 1978–79, then recorded throughout the decades of the 1980s and 1990s with Clark Tracey, Stan Tracey, Jack Sharpe, John Dankworth, Colin Towns, Guy Barker, Richard Niles, Shorty Rogers, Michael Nyman, and Bud Shank. He also performed with singers Ella Fitzgerald, Frank Sinatra, George Michael, and Mel Tormé, as well as for the arrangers Nelson Riddle, Gil Evans, and Quincy Jones. He has worked extensively as a session musician in commercial studios.

In addition to saxophone, Talbot also occasionally plays clarinet, both in jazz and classical settings.

== Discography as leader ==
- Altitude, 1986 LP
