= Jack Sharpe (musician) =

Jack Sharpe (19 August 1930 – 4 November 1994) was an English jazz saxophonist and bandleader, chiefly active on the London jazz scene.

Sharpe began playing tenor sax at age eighteen. He played with Vic Lewis and Teddy Foster in the early 1950s and freelanced in the London area. He worked as a taxi driver in 1953, played with Dizzy Reece in 1954, then in Tubby Hayes's band in 1955–56. He played with Mike Senn in the Downbeaters after 1957, worked further with Hayes, and led his own sextet in 1958. Additionally, he found work promoting and booking other musicians.

In the early 1970s Sharpe managed a night club where he led the house band on week ends. Around 1975, he left music intermittently to drive a cab. He returned to jazz in 1985, playing with Alan Branscombe and leading a Tubby Hayes tribute band.

== Discography ==
- Catalyst:A Tribute to Tubby Hayes (1987)
- Roarin' (1989)
- Sharpe as a Knife

== Sources ==
- Mark Gilbert, "Jack Sharpe". Grove Jazz online.
