= Grande Arche =

Monument to humanity in Greater Paris

Grande Arche de la Défense

General information
- Type: office
- Location: La Défense, Île-de-France, France
- Coordinates: 48°53′34″N 2°14′09″E
- Construction started: 1985
- Completed: 1989
- Inaugurated: 14 July 1989

Height
- Height: 110 m (360 ft)

Design and construction
- Architects: Johan Otto von Spreckelsen; Erik Reitzel

La Grande Arche de la Défense (French: [la ɡʁɑ̃d aʁʃ d(ə) la defɑ̃s]; "The Great Arch of the Defense"), originally called La Grande Arche de la Fraternité (French: [fʁatɛʁnite]; "Fraternity"), is a monument and building in the business district of La Défense and in the commune of Puteaux, to the west of Paris, France. It is usually known as the Arche de la Défense or simply as La Grande Arche.

A 110-metre-high (360 ft) cube, La Grande Arche is part of the perspective from the Louvre to Arc de Triomphe, and was one of the Grands Projets of François Mitterrand. The distance from La Grande Arche to Arc de Triomphe is 4 km (2 1/2 miles).

== Design and construction ==
The Grande Arche at night

In 1982, a great national design competition was launched as an initiative of French president François Mitterrand. Danish architect Johan Otto von Spreckelsen (1929–1987) and Danish engineer Erik Reitzel (1941–2012) designed the winning entry to be a late-20th-century version of the Arc de Triomphe: a monument to humanity and humanitarian ideals rather than military victories. The construction of the monument began in 1985, with most of the work being carried out by French civil engineering company Bouygues.

Spreckelsen resigned in July 1986 and ratified the transfer of all his architectural responsibilities to his associate, French architect Paul Andreu. Reitzel continued his work until the monument was completed in 1989. The Grande Arche is in the approximate shape of a cube with a width, height, and depth of 110 m (360 ft). According to Reitzel it was designed to resemble a three-dimensional projection of a tesseract, the four-dimensional analogue of the cube. It has a prestressed concrete frame covered with glass and is covered in Bethel Granite.

La Grande Arche was inaugurated in July 1989, with grand military parades that marked the bicentennial of the French Revolution. It completed the line of monuments that forms the axe historique running through Paris. The Grande Arche is turned at an angle of 6.33° about the vertical axis. The most important reason for this turn was technical: with a Paris Metro and RER station, and a motorway all situated directly underneath the Arche, the angle was the only way to accommodate the structure's giant foundations.

From an architectural point of view, the turn emphasises the depth of the monument and is similar to the turn of the Louvre at the other end of the axe historique. The Arche is placed so that it forms a secondary axis with two of the highest buildings in Paris at the time, the Tour Eiffel and the Tour Montparnasse.

The two sides of the Arche house government offices. The roof section was closed in 2010 following an accident without injury and the marble tiles, which had begun to peel off, were replaced with granite ones. It opened again in 2017 after seven years of renovation work. It features panoramic views of Paris and includes a restaurant and an exhibition area dedicated to photojournalism.

The void contains skeletal shafts for panoramic lifts and a PTFE-and-fibreglass tensile-membrane sunshade known as the "Cloud" (Le nuage).

The Danish architect, von Spreckelsen, chose Italian Carrara marble for the tile cladding of the façade, for the marble's gleaming, milky white exterior. This caused structural problems, as marble is porous, rainwater got into its pores, and when the temperature froze, the ice in its pores cracked the marble, and tiles began buckling and falling down, luckily without hitting, injuring or killing anyone. The monument had to be closed for a few years while French engineers (von Spreckelsen had retired from the project before it was completed and was dead by the time of the collapsing tiles) had the marble tiles removed and replaced with granite quarried in Vermont, which has proved durable, at a cost of some €200M.

== Gallery ==
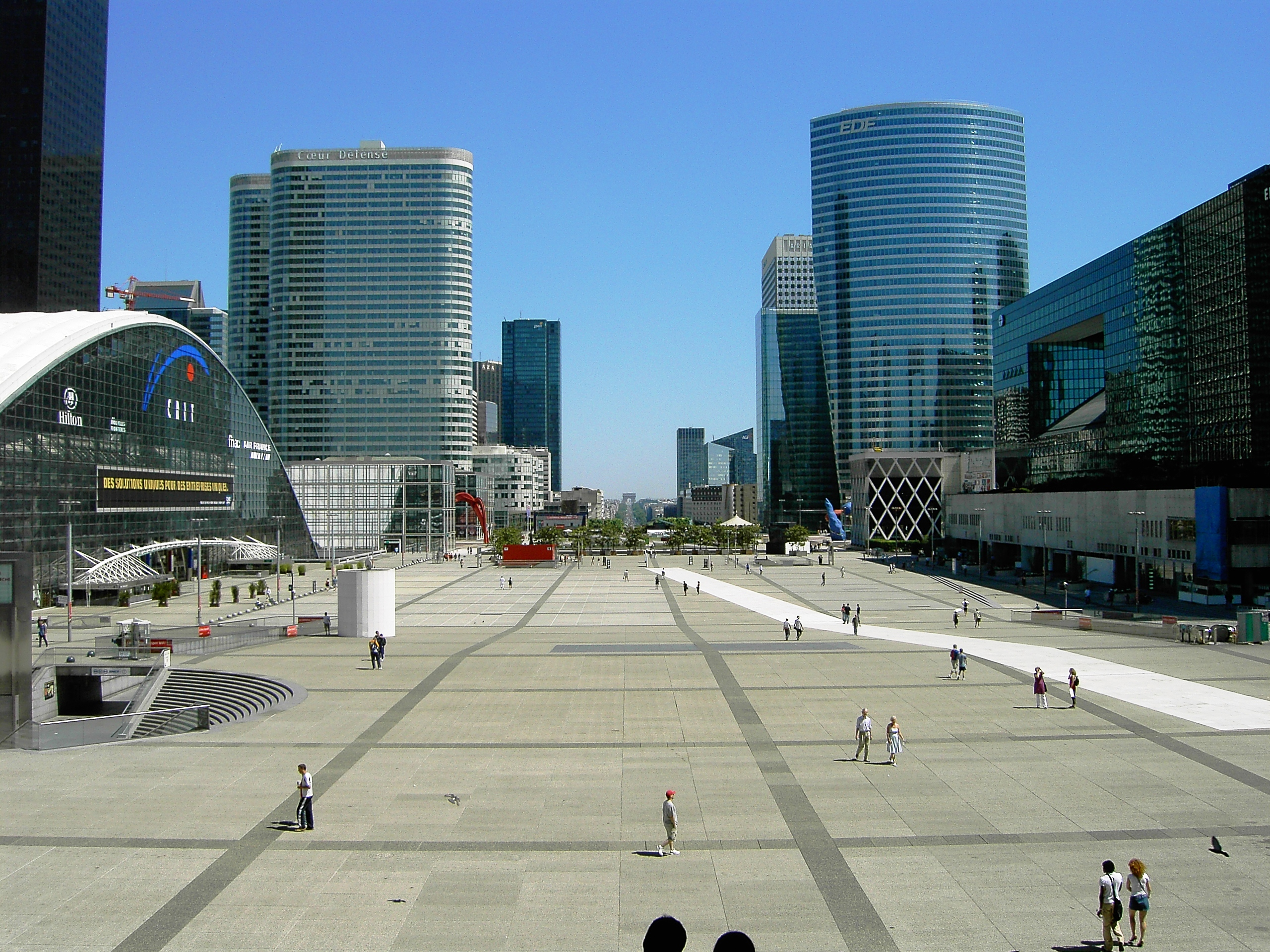
The Arc de Triomphe from the Grande Arche

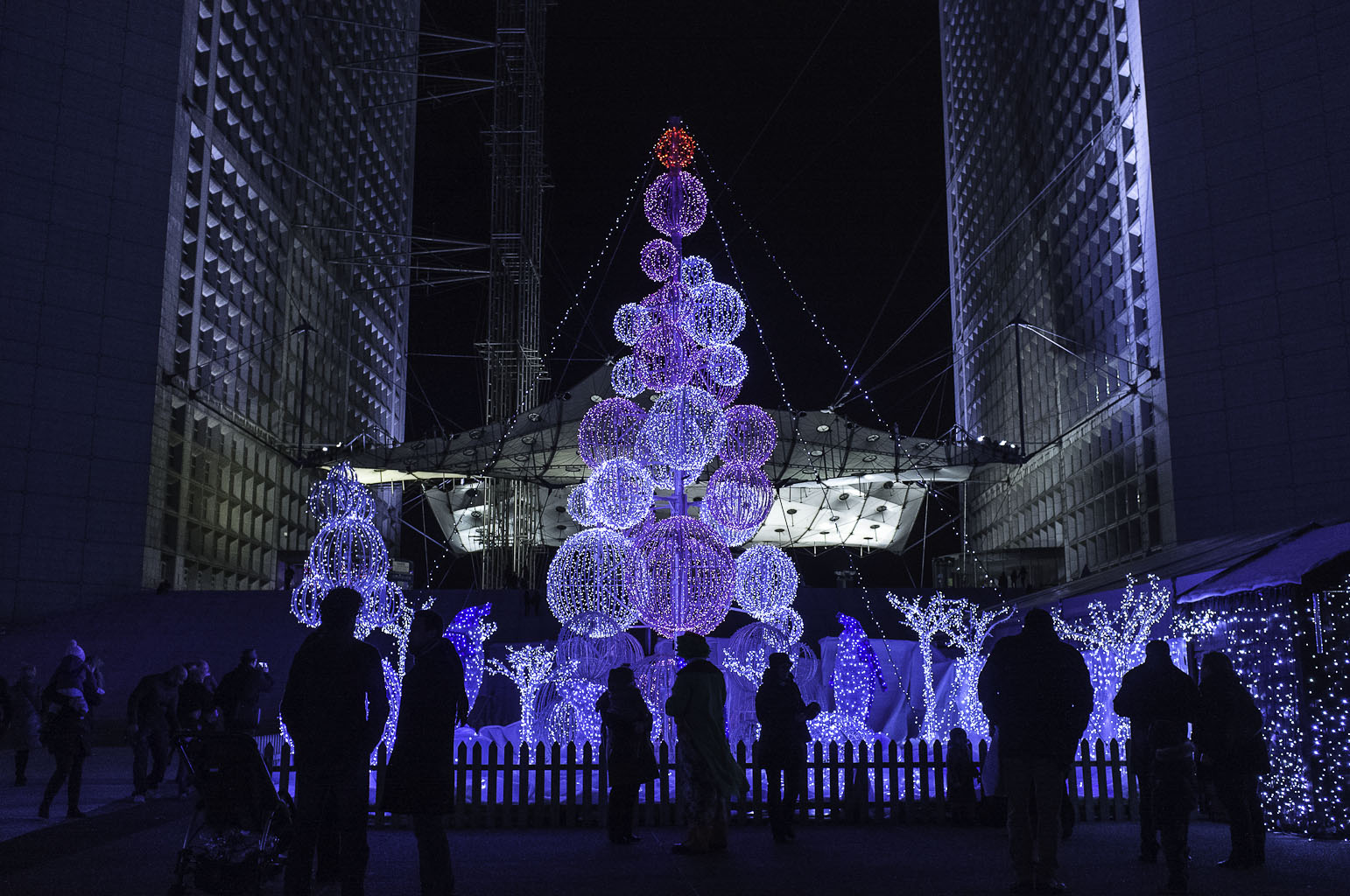
Christmas decoration at the Grand Arche

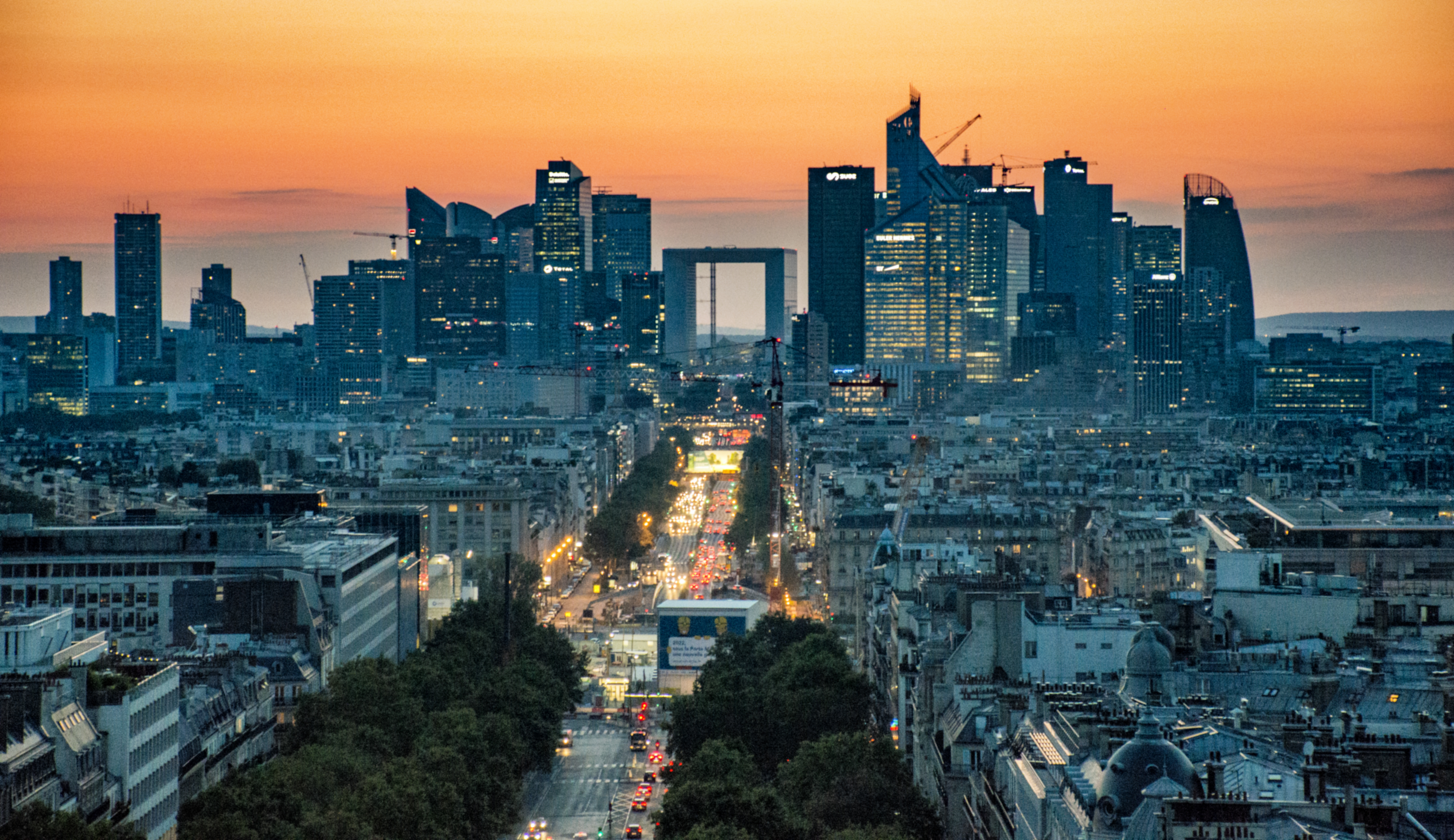
The Grande Arche seen from the Arc de Triomphe on the Axe historique

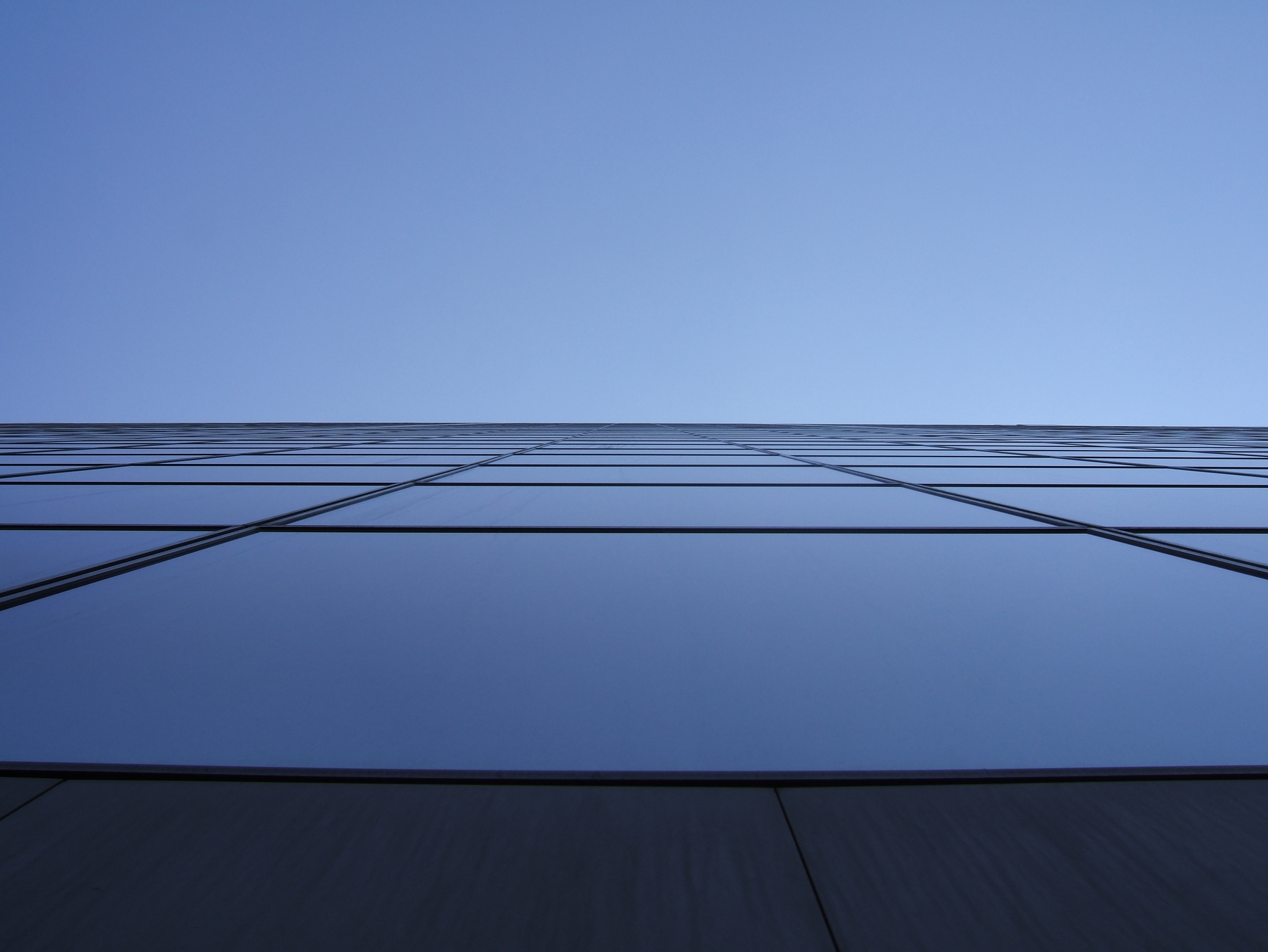
The north façade of the Grande Arche de la Défense

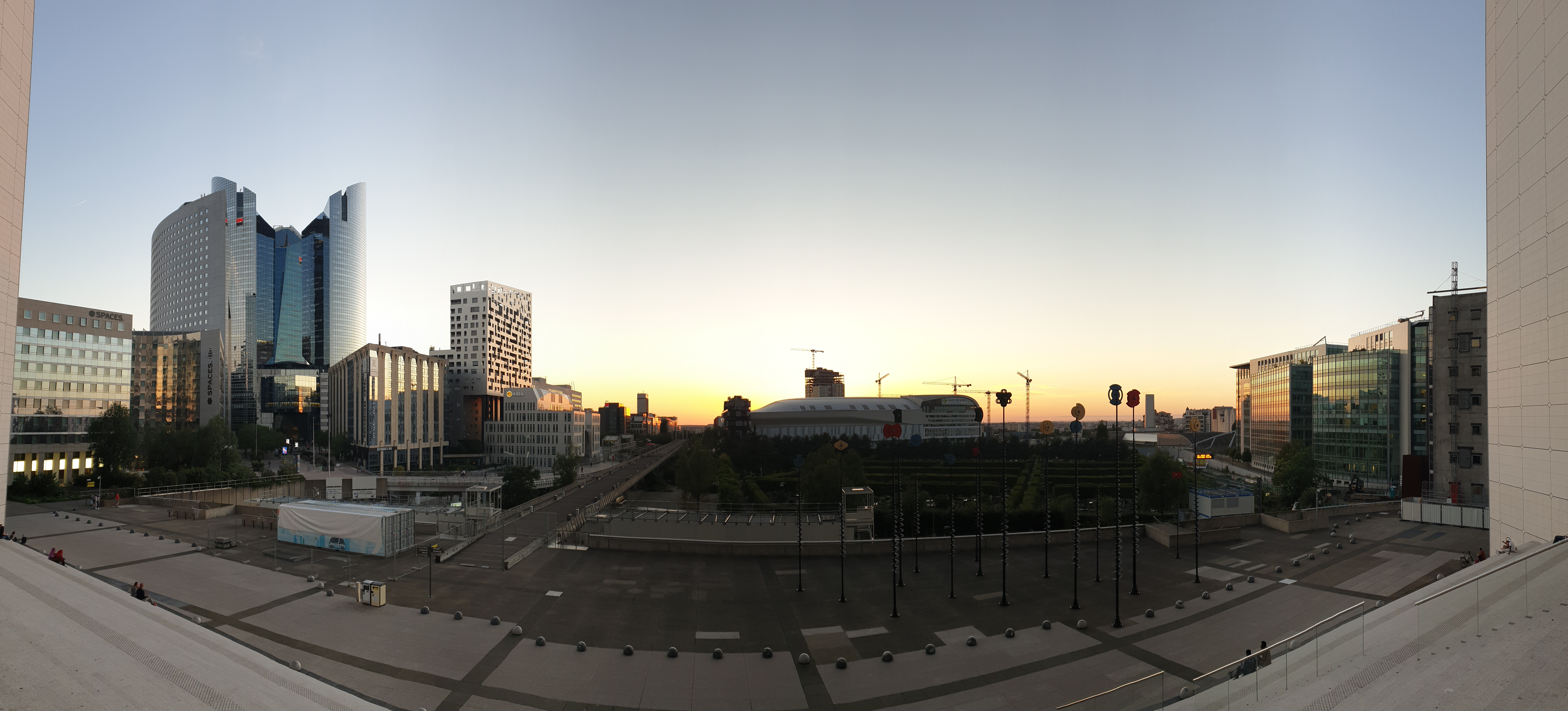
The western part of La Défense as seen from the Grande Arche

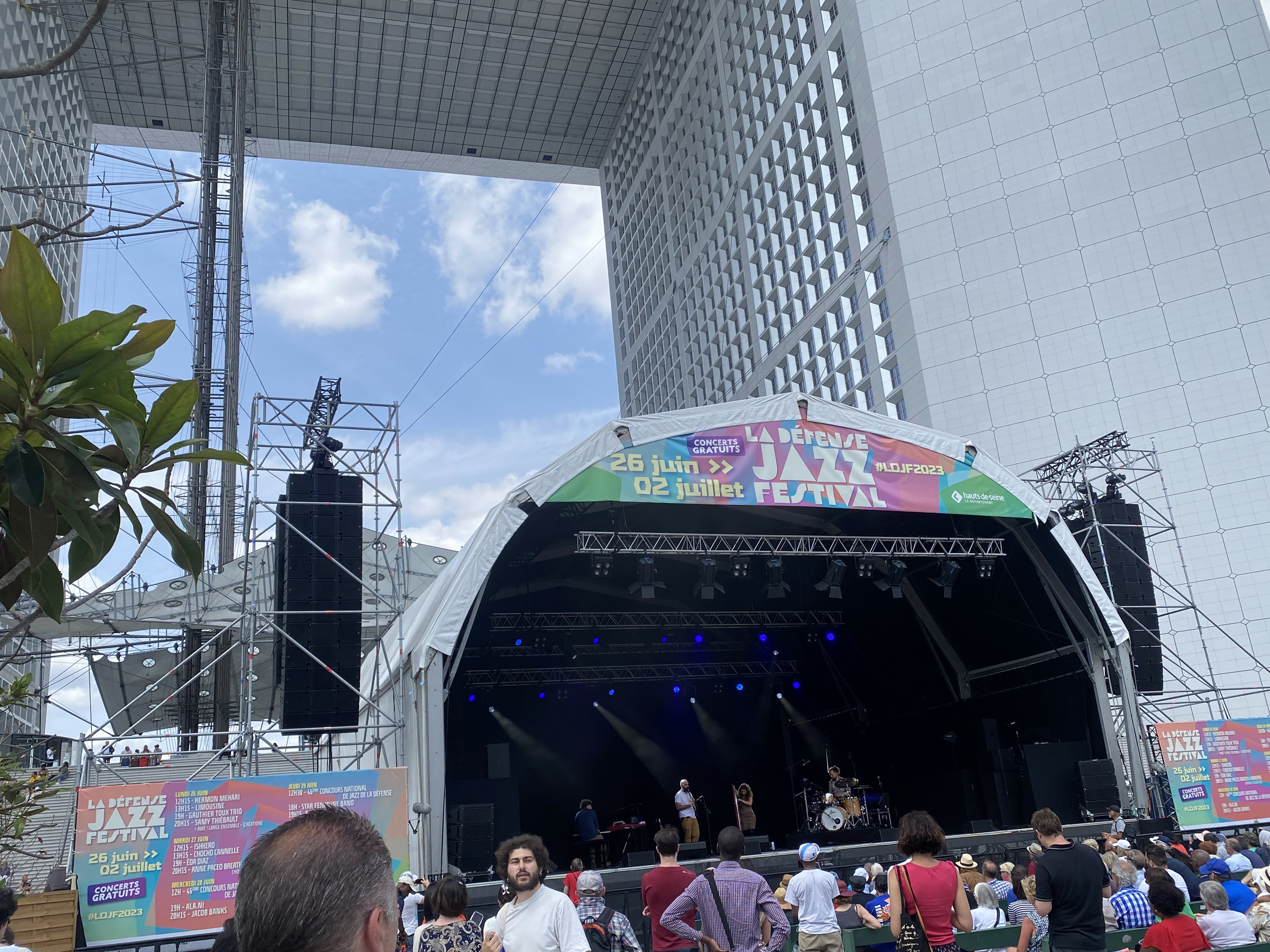
The 2023 La Défense Jazz Festival takes place under the Grande Arche

== Tenants ==
Organisations headquartered in the Grande Arche include the Bureau d'Enquêtes sur les Événements de Mer (BEAmer), the French marine accident investigation agency; and the French Land Transport Accident Investigation Bureau, in the southern portion.

== Cultural representations ==
In 2016 Laurence Cossé published in a novelistic form an account of Spreckelsen's work. The book was used as a script for Stéphane Demoustier's 2025 film The Great Arch (L'Inconnu de la Grande Arche) which dramatized the architect's efforts to realize the project.

== See also ==
- List of tallest buildings and structures in the Paris region
- Paris La Défense – Une Ville En Concert
