= 1972 in jazz =

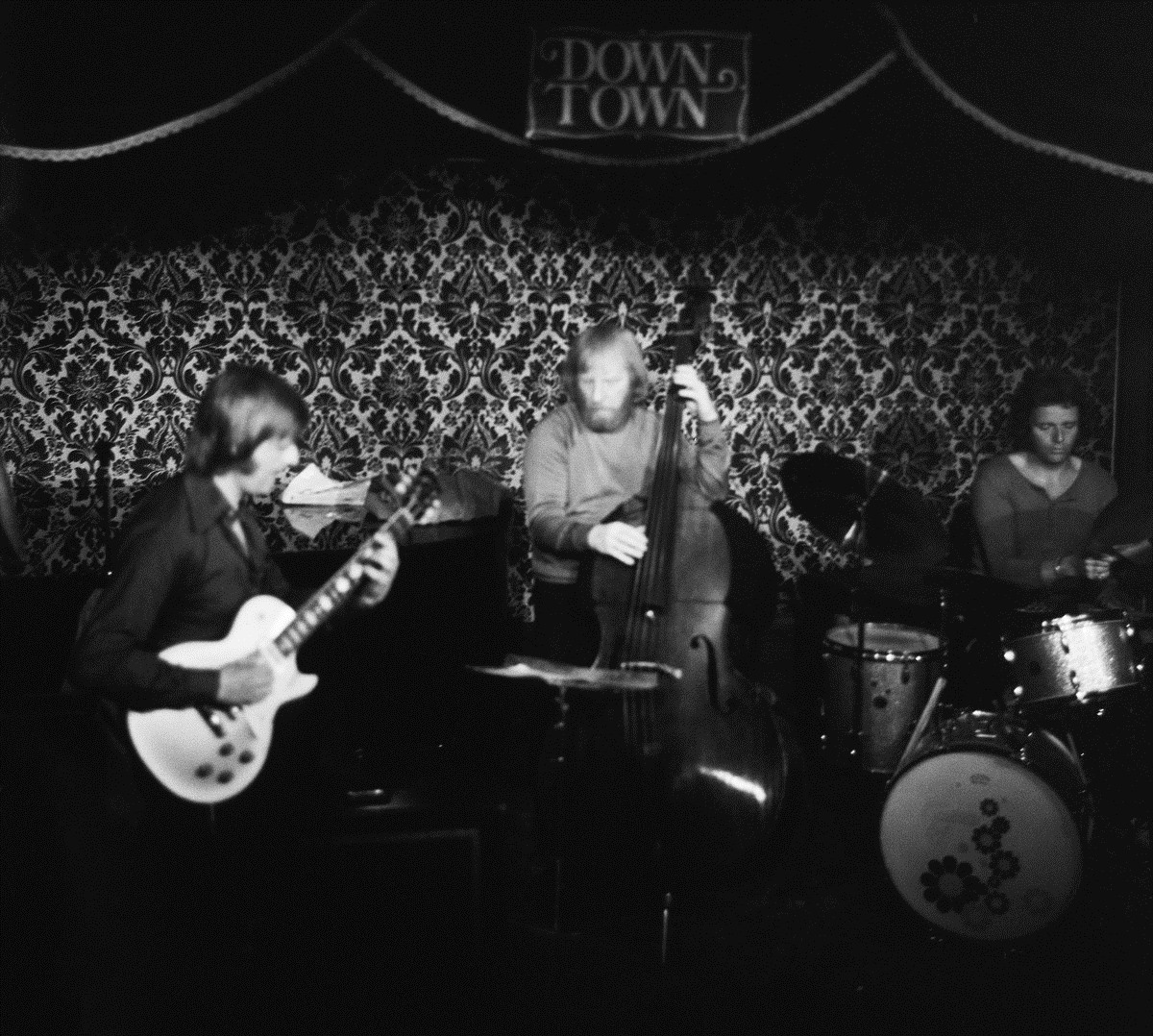
- Rune Gustafsson, Red Mitchell and Egil "Bop" Johansen, 1972.
- Decade: 1970s in jazz
- Music: 1972 in music
- Standards: List of post-1950 jazz standards
- See also: 1971 in jazz – 1973 in jazz

This is a timeline documenting events of Jazz in the year 1972.

== Events ==
=== April ===
- 21
  - Grant Green records Live at the Lighthouse at the Lighthouse Café in Hermosa Beach, California.

=== June ===
- 10 – The very first Moers Festival started in Moers, Germany (June 10 – 11).
- 16 – The 6th Montreux Jazz Festival started in Montreux, Switzerland (June 16 – August 20).
- 29 – The 19th Newport Jazz Festival started in Newport, Rhode Island (June 29 – July 8).

=== September ===
- 15 – The 15th Monterey Jazz Festival started in Monterey, California (September 15 – 17).

== Album releases ==
- Neil Ardley: Symphony of Amaranths
- Gato Barbieri: Bolivia (album)
- Paul Bley: Open, to Love
- Anthony Braxton
  - Donna Lee
  - Saxophone Improvisations
  - Town Hall 1972
- Gary Burton: Alone at Last
- Ornette Coleman: Skies of America
- Chick Corea: Return To Forever
- Miles Davis: On The Corner
- Bill Evans: Living Time (with George Russell)
- Gunter Hampel
  - Angel (Gunter Hampel album)
  - Broadway
  - Familie (album)
  - Waltz For 11 Universes In A Corridor
- Herbie Hancock: Crossings (album)
- Julius Hemphill: Dogon AD
- Joe Henderson: Black Is The Color
- Keith Jarrett
  - Expectations (Keith Jarrett album)
  - Facing You
- Eric Kloss: One, Two, Free
- David Liebman: Open Sky (album)
- London Jazz Composers Orchestra: Ode (album)
- Albert Mangelsdorff: Trombirds
- Nucleus: Belladonna (album)
- Oregon: Music Of Another Present Era
- Annette Peacock: I'm the One
- Jean-Luc Ponty: Sonata Erotica
- John Surman: Westering Home
- McCoy Tyner
  - Echoes of a Friend
  - Sahara (album)
- Weather Report: I Sing the Body Electric
- Randy Weston: Blue Moses
- Stanley Cowell – Illusion Suite
- Stanley Clarke – Children of Forever
- Gary Bartz – Juju Street Songs
- Airto Moreira – Free
- Charles Earland – Charles III
- Stanley Turrentine – Cherry
- Bucky Pizzarelli – Green Guitar Blues

== Deaths ==
January

- 27 – Mahalia Jackson, American singer (born 1911).

February

- 19 – Lee Morgan, American trumpeter, shot dead (born 1938).

March

- 13 – Clancy Hayes, American vocalist, banjoist and guitarist (born 1908).
- 27 – Sharkey Bonano, American trumpeter, band leader, and vocalist (born 1904).

April

- 3 – Ferde Grofé, American composer, arranger, and pianist (born 1892).

May

- 5 – Reverend Gary Davis, American singer, banjoist, guitarist, and harmonica player (born 1896).

June

- 8 – Jimmy Rushing, American blues shouter, balladeer, singer, and pianist (born 1901).

July

- 3 – Marty Flax, American saxophonist (born 1924).
- 10 – Lovie Austin, 84, American pianist, composer, and bandleader (born 1887).

August

- 5 – Mezz Mezzrow, American clarinetist and saxophonist (born 1899).
- 9 – André Ekyan, French reedist (born 1907).
- 20 – Mike Bryan, American guitarist (born 1916).
- 24 – Don Byas, American tenor saxophonist (born 1912).
- 31
  - Hideo Shiraki, Japanese drummer and bandleader (born 1933).
  - Dalva de Oliveira, Brazilian singer (internal bleeding) (born 1917).

October

- 13 – Phil Seamen, English drummer (born 1926).
- 25 – Cal Massey, American trumpeter and composer (born 1928).

November

- 24 – Hall Overton, American composer and pianist (born 1920).

December

- 3 – Bill Johnson, African-American upright bassist (born 1872).
- 5 – Kenny Dorham, American trumpeter, singer, and composer (born 1924).
- 25 – Dud Bascomb, American trumpeter (born 1916).
- 29 – Hayes Alvis, American upright bassist and tubist (born 1907).

== Births ==
January

- 6 – Mina Agossi, French singer-songwriter.

February

- 1 – Siri Gjære, Norwegian singer.
- 14 – Daniela Schaechter, Italian singer and pianist.

March

- 7 – Katrine Madsen, Danish singer.
- 12 – Lisa Werlinder, Swedish actress and singer.
- 14 – Noriko Ueda, Japanese upright bassist, pianist, singer, composer, and arranger.
- 21 – Jesse van Ruller, Dutch guitarist and composer.
- 25 – Mimi Jones, American bassist, vocalist, composer, bandleader, and label director.

April

- 9 – Christos Rafalides, Greek vibraphonist, composer, and educator.
- 15 – Christer Fredriksen, Norwegian guitarist.
- 16 – Øyvind Nypan, Norwegian guitarist.

May

- 31 – Christian McBride, American bassist.

July

- 1 – Alex Machacek, Austrian guitarist.
- 4 – Ketil Gutvik, Norwegian guitarist.
- 29 – Roger Johansen, Norwegian drummer.

August

- 13 – Oscar Peñas, Catalan-American guitarist and composer.
- 21 – Nino Katamadze, Georgian singer.

September

- 12 – Gerard Presencer, English trumpeter.
- 27 – Lindha Kallerdahl, Swedish singer, multi-instrumentalist, and composer.

October

- 2 – John Daversa, American trumpeter and composer.
- 11 – Federico Ughi, Italian drummer and composer.
- 12 – Eugene Ball, Australian composer and trumpeter.
- 22 – Doug Wamble, American guitarist and vocalist.

November

- 5 – Neil Cowley, English pianist.

December

- 2 – Pasquale Stafano, Italian pianist, composer, and arranger.
- 5 – Stefano Bollani, Italian composer, pianist, and singer.
- 7 – Thomas Strønen, Norwegian drummer.
- 28 – Terreon Gully, American drummer.

Unknown date

- Anders Christensen, Danish upright bassist.
- Ari Poutiainen, Finnish violinist, violist, composer, and researcher.
- Jay Soto, American guitarist.
- Meriç Yurdatapan, Turkish singer.
- Morten Lund, Danish drummer.

== See also ==
- 1970s in jazz
- List of years in jazz
- 1972 in music
