= Canadian jazz =

Regional scene of jazz

Canadian jazz refers to the jazz and jazz-related music performed by jazz bands and performers in Canada. There are hundreds of local and regionally based Canadian jazz bands and performers. A number of Canadian jazz artists have achieved international prominence, including Oscar Peterson, Maynard Ferguson, and Gil Evans.

== History ==
=== Early history ===
The first jazz concert in Canada was by the touring Creole Orchestra and Ragtime Band, led by Bill Johnson and featuring cornetist Freddie Keppard at the Pantages Playhouse Theatre in Winnipeg, Manitoba on September 21, 1914. A few days later the band performed at Edmonton. The Winnipeg concert was the first jazz performance outside the United States and the beginning of jazz as an international movement.

Since then, given its proximity to the United States, Canada quickly became the first country beyond the USA to have its own jazz scene, with artists popping up in cities across the country, notably in Montreal, Quebec in the 1910s. In part this was due to U.S. black jazz musicians finding escape in Canada from the racism rampant in the U.S.

In Vancouver George Paris organized a jazz band for the Patricia Hotel in 1917. He is regarded by some as Canada's first true jazz musician. Others give that status to pianist Harry Thomas who recorded improvisational-accented ragtime music in 1916. Other groups soon sprung up, among them the Clar-Ra Ladies Jazz Orchestra. The Jazz Baby Vaudeville (AKA the Original Winnipeg Jazz Babies) was composed of Winnipeg teens, each playing two or more instruments. These bands performed in dance clubs across the Prairies in the 1920s. In 1926 pianist Shirley Oliver, with a background playing "hot-dance" tunes, opened a jazz music studio in Edmonton.

The first successful Black Canadian Jazz artists to record were Shelton Brooks (1886-1975) and Tiny Parham (1900-1943). Brooks, a vaudeville performer, pianist and songwriter who had been active since the 1900's who would write "At the Darktown Strutters' Ball" which would be a recorded by several Jazz artists and "Some Of These Days" for Sophie Tucker. He himself would record some singles in the 1920's and 30's and play piano for Ethel Waters and Sara Martin. Parham was a pianist and bandleader who recorded several sides in the 1920's and 30's as well as accompanying Johnny Dodds, Punch Miller, banjoist Papa Charlie Jackson, saxophone player Junie Cobb and bassist Milt Hinton. It's notable that both men had moved to America to establish their careers as there was as of yet no real domestic record industry in Canada at the time.

Guy Lombardo formed the big band called the Royal Canadians in 1924 with his brothers and sold between 100 and 300 million records during their lifetimes.

In 1930 an American Big Band called the Orange Blossoms started an extended run in Toronto at the Casa Loma, then being run as a luxury hotel where they would become so popular they would later change their name to the Casa Loma Orchestra. Their success would include a coast-to-coast radio show which became one of the first Swing bands to gain nation-wide attention in both Canada and America where they would score several hits into the 1940's. The leadership of the band would remain with American Glen Gray but frequent residencies and member turnover in Toronto would lead to several Canadian musicians being added. Also in the 30's in Alberta Mart Kenny would lead a band that would become popular in Western Canada and record some singles for Bluebird Records.

=== 1950s and 60s ===
By the 1950s, jazz was popular across Canada, and a number of Canadian jazz artists became well known beyond their home country, most notably pianist Oscar Peterson, known as a virtuoso pianist and recording artist. During this decade, Canadian Gil Evans was noted for his collaborations with Miles Davis as well as his own recordings, many of which are important early examples of a fusion of jazz and classical music known as third stream.

Montreal's Maynard Ferguson was a notable trumpet player in the 1950s and 60s, who was known for playing in a high register. He toured and recorded with his own band as well as with Stan Kenton. Popular big bands of this era were led by Fraser MacPherson and Moe Koffman. In the mid-60s, Canadian Bassist Don Thompson and drummer Terry Clarke toured with American sax player John Handy and recorded on his seminal live album Recorded Live at the Monterey Jazz Festival. In 1965, Oscar Peterson composed his Canadiana Suite, an important recording and composition in Canadian jazz history.

=== 1970s ===
Maynard Ferguson achieved mainstream success and recorded a number of popular albums in the 1970s, including a pop hit cover of "Gonna Fly Now" from the movie Rocky, earning him a gold album.

During the 1970s, innovative Canadian guitarists, Lenny Breau and Ed Bickert, were among the most highly-regarded jazz guitarists of their time. Breau was known for finger picking style, his use of seven-string guitar, and his ability to play bass, chords and melody simultaneously. Bickert was known for popularizing the use of solid-body guitars, rare among jazz artists at that time, which produced a distinct and signature tone.

In the 1970s, CBC records released a number of important Canadian jazz albums including guitarist Sonny Greenwich's 1974 album Son Song, among the most highly regarded albums in Canadian jazz. Canadian trumpeter Kenny Wheeler, who moved to the UK in the 1950s, released a number of albums on ECM Records in the 70s and 80s. Also recorded by ECM was Canadian jazz pianist Paul Bley. John Warren released Tales of the Algonquin with British saxophonist John Surman in 1971.

During the mid-70s, American saxophonist Paul Desmond relocated to Toronto where he performed with his Toronto Quartet, including Ed Bickert, Jerry Fuller, and bassist Don Thompson.

=== 1980s and 90s ===
In 1980 the Montreal International Jazz Festival began, a festival that eventually became the largest jazz festival in the world. Several important live albums have been recorded at the festival including those by Miles Davis and Ahmad Jamal. Pianist Oliver Jones returned to Montreal in the 1980s, where he performed and recorded a number of albums.

Jazz fusion band Uzeb featuring virtuoso bassist Alain Caron and guitarist Michel Cusson sold hundreds of thousands of albums in the 1980s.

During the 1990s, pianist Renee Rosnes released a number of albums for Blue Note. Other notable Canadian jazz recordings of the 1990s include Kenny Wheeler's Angel Song.

=== 21st century ===
In the 21st century, a number of Canadian jazz vocalists, such as Diana Krall and Michael Buble became popular. Younger Canadian jazz artists include the band BadBadNotGood, singers Nikki Yanofsky, Dominique Fils-Aimé, Emilie-Claire Barlow, and Caity Gyorgy, trumpeter Ingrid Jensen, and guitarist Jocelyn Gould.

== Nationally or internationally prominent artists ==
As of 2021, three Canadians artists have been inducted into the DownBeat Jazz Hall of Fame: Oscar Peterson, Maynard Ferguson, and Gil Evans. In addition to these three, six other jazz artists have been inducted into the Canadian Music Hall of Fame: Oliver Jones, Lenny Breau, Moe Koffman, Guy Lombardo, Rob McConnell, and Kenny Wheeler.

Other important Canadian jazz musicians include singers Judi Singh, Michael Bublé, Molly Johnson, Diana Krall, Carol Welsman and Eleanor Collins, called “The Canadian First Lady of Jazz”, as well as bandleaders Fraser MacPherson and Mynie Sutton, renowned free jazz pianist Paul Bley, pianist Renee Rosnes, bassists Don Thompson and Alain Caron, and guitarists Ed Bickert, Sonny Greenwich, and Lorne Lofsky.

== Jazz festivals in Canada ==
Many Canadian cities host one or more jazz festivals. The Montreal International Jazz Festival, for instance, is the largest in the world. Other prominent Canadian jazz festivals include the Winnipeg International Jazz Festival, the Vancouver International Jazz Festival, the Ottawa Jazz Festival, and the Toronto Jazz Festival.
