= Richard Edwards (musician) =

British musician

Richard Edwards is a London-based classical and jazz trombone player as well as composer/arranger.

== Discography ==
=== As sideman ===
With Jamiroquai

- Blow Your Mind (Sony Soho Square, 1993)
- Emergency on Planet Earth (Sony Soho Square,1993)
- Too Young to Die (Sony Soho Square, 1993)
- Half the Man (Sony Soho Square, 1994)
- The Return of the Space Cowboy (Sony Soho Square, 1994)

With Colin Towns

- Mask Orchestra (Jazz Label 1993)
- Nowhere & Heaven (Provocateur, 1996)
- Bolt from the Blue (Provocateur, 1997)
- Another Think Coming (Provocateur, 2001)

With Working Week

- I Thought I'd Never See You Again (Virgin, 1985)
- Companeros (Virgin, 1986)
- Fire in the Mountain (10 Records, 1989)
- May 1985 (Promising Music 2015)

With others

- Kim Appleby, Breakaway (Parlophone, 1993)
- Kim Appleby, Kim Appleby (Parlophone, 1990)
- Lorne Balfe, Penguins of Madagascar (Sony Classical, 2015)
- Gilbert Becaud, Ensemble (RCA, 1996)
- Belle and Sebastian, Dear Catastrophe (Rough Trade, 2003)
- Belle and Sebastian, I'm a Cuckoo (Rough Trade, 2004)
- Carla Bley, The Very Big Carla Bley Band (WATT/ECM, 1991)
- Carla Bley, Big Band Theory (WATT, 1993)
- Blur, Parklife (Food, 1994)
- Miguel Bosé, Por Vos Muero (WEA, 2004)
- Chris Botti, When I Fall in Love (Columbia, 2004)
- Paul Carrack, Soul Shadows (Carrack-UK 2016)
- Cocoon, Where the Oceans End (Barclay, 2010)
- The Cure, Wild Mood Swings (Fiction, 1996)
- Dominique Dalcan, Cannibale (Crammed Discs 1994)
- Aura Dione, Can't Steal the Music (Island, 2017)
- The Divine Comedy, Foreverland (Divine Comedy 2016)
- Sheena Easton, Fabulous (Universal, 2000)
- Caro Emerald, The Shocking Miss Emerald (Grandmono, 2013)
- Paloma Faith, The Architect (RCA Sony 2017)
- Florence and the Machine, How Big, How Blue, How Beautiful (Island, 2015)
- The Mike Flowers Pops, A Groovy Place (London, 1996)
- Peter Gabriel, Scratch My Back (Real World, 2010)
- Peter Gabriel, New Blood (Real World, 2011)
- Beth Gibbons & Rustin Man, Out of Season (Go! Beat, 2002)
- God Help the Girl, God Help the Girl (Matador, 2009)
- Hal, Hal (Rough Trade, 2004)
- Geri Halliwell, Schizophonic (EMI, 1999)
- Nick Heyward, From Monday to Sunday (Epic, 1993)
- Tuomas Holopainen, Music Inspired by the Life and Times of Scrooge (Nuclear Blast 2014)
- The Horrors, Skying (XL 2011)
- Hue & Cry, Showtime! (Permanent 1994)
- Hurts, Exile (Major Label 2013)
- Julio Iglesias, Noche De Cuatro Lunas (Columbia/Sony Discos 2000)
- Incognito, 100 Degrees and Rising (Talkin' Loud, 1995)
- Halo James, Witness (Epic, 1990)
- Katrina and the Waves, Waves (Capitol, 1986)
- Level 42, Forever Now (RCA/BMG 1994)
- Baaba Maal, Firin' in Fouta (Mango, 1994)
- Paul McCartney, Flaming Pie (Parlophone MPL 1997)
- Joni Mitchell, Both Sides Now (Reprise, 2000)
- Moondog, Moondog Big Band (Trimba Music 1995)
- Michael Nyman, Time Will Pronounce (Argo, 1993)
- Mark Owen, Green Man (RCA/BMG 1996)
- Renaud, Marchand De Cailloux (Virgin, 1991)
- Don Rendell, If I Should Lose You (Spotlite, 1992)
- Shorty Rogers, Bud Shank With Vic Lewis, Back Again (Choice, 1984)
- Rumer, Boys Don't Cry (Atlantic, 2012)
- John Surman, The Brass Project (ECM, 1993)
- John Surman, Free and Equal (ECM, 2003)
- Shriekback, Big Night Music (Island, 1986)
- Skank, Velocia (Sony 2014)
- Sting, Ten Summoner's Tales (A&M, 1993)
- Sting, The Last Ship (Cherrytree, 2013)
- Stonephace, Stonephace (Tru Thoughts 2009)
- Suede, Dog Man Star (Nude, 1994)
- Swing Out Sister, It's Better to Travel (Mercury, 1987)
- Swing Out Sister, The Living Return (Mercury, 1994)
- The Ten Tenors, Here's to the Heroes (Warner Bros., 2006)
- Tracey Ullman, You Caught Me Out (Stiff, 1984)
- John Warren, The Traveller's Tale (Fledg'ling, 2017)
- When in Rome, When in Rome (10 1988)
- Kenny Wheeler, A Long Time Ago (ECM, 1999)
- Tam White, Keep It Under Your Hat (Ronnie Scott's Jazz House 1991)
- Robbie Williams, Swing When You're Winning (Chrysalis, 2001)
- Amy Winehouse, Back to Black (Island/Universal 2006)
- Amy Winehouse, Love Is a Losing Game (Island/Universal 2007)

Soundtracks

- Marco Beltrami, World War Z (Warner Bros., 2013)
- Daft Punk, TRON: Legacy (Walt Disney, 2010)
- Anne Dudley, Gentlemen Don't Eat Poets (Pangaea, 1997)
- Michael Giacchino, Jurassic World: Fallen Kingdom (Back Lot Music 2018)
- Bernard Herrmann, The Day the Earth Stood Still (Varèse Sarabande, 2003)
- James Newton Howard, Fantastic Beasts and Where to Find Them (Music on Vinyl, 2016)
- James Newton Howard, Fantastic Beasts: the Crimes of Grindelwald (WaterTower Music 2018)
- James Newton Howard, Red Sparrow (Sony Classical, 2018)
- John Powell, Pan (Sony Classical, 2015)
- John Powell, The Bourne Ultimatum (Decca, 2007)
- Nick Urata, Paddington (Decca/Universal, 2014)
- Hans Zimmer, Inception (Reprise/WaterTower Music, 2010)
- Hans Zimmer, The Dark Knight Rises (WaterTower Music, 2012)
- Hans Zimmer, Kung Fu Panda 3 (Sony Classical, 2016)
