= Coruscating =

Studio album by John Surman
- Released: September 21, 2000
- Recorded: January 1999
- Studio: CTS Studios; London, England
- Genre: Jazz
- Length: 53:57
- Label: ECM; ECM 1702
- Producer: Manfred Eicher

John Surman chronology
Proverbs and Songs (1997)	Coruscating (2000)	Invisible Nature (2000)

Coruscating is an album by English saxophonist John Surman recorded in January 1999 and released by ECM September the following year. Surman is backed by bassist Chris Laurence and string quartet Trans4mation, consisting violinists Rita Manning and Keith Pascoe, violist Bill Hawkes, and cellist Nick Cooper.

== Reception ==
The AllMusic review by Thom Jurek awarded the album 4½ stars, stating, "Coruscating is one of the finer moments in an already stellar career. Coruscating's mood and timbre is delicate, mysterious, and gentle, but its musical reach is muscular and wide."

Professional ratings
Review scores
Source	Rating
AllMusic	4.5/5 stars
The Penguin Guide to Jazz Recordings	3.5/4 stars

== Track listing ==
All compositions by John Surman.

1. "At Dusk" – 2:20
2. "Dark Corners" – 5:01
3. "Stone Flower" – 5:53
4. "Moonless Midnight" – 7:37
5. "Winding Passages" – 6:49
6. "An Illusive Shadow" – 9:28
7. "Crystal Walls" – 9:53
8. "For the Moment" – 6:56

== Personnel ==
=== Musicians ===
- John Surman – soprano and baritone saxophones, bass and contrabass clarinets
- Chris Laurence – double bass
- Trans4mation
  - Rita Manning, Keith Pascoe – violins
  - Bill Hawkes – viola
  - Nick Cooper – cello

=== Technical personnel ===
- Manfred Eicher – producer
- Markus Heiland – engineer
- Sandro Kancheli – layout
- Dieter Rehm – cover photos
- Roberto Masotti – liner photo
- John Surman – liner notes
