= Free and Equal (album) =

Live album by John Surman
- Released: 2003
- Recorded: June 2001
- Venue: Queen Elizabeth Hall; London, England
- Genre: Jazz
- Length: 67:03
- Label: ECM; ECM 1802
- Producer: Manfred Eicher

John Surman chronology
Invisible Nature (1999)	Free and Equal (2003)	Rain on the Window (2006)

Free and Equal is a live album by English saxophonist John Surman featuring American drummer Jack DeJohnette and the London Brass recorded in Queen Elizabeth Hall in London in June 2001 and released on ECM in 2003.

== Reception ==
The AllMusic review by Alain Drouot awarded the album 3½ stars, stating, "Free and Equal finds its place somewhere between John Surman's past collaborations with Jack DeJohnette and his Brass Project with composer Peter Warren. Less atmospheric than the duos with the drummer and less jazzy than the latter, it still bears the inimitable stamp of the British reed player. It harks back to his pastoral and even medieval leanings and his arranging skills certainly capture the spotlight, his lyrical and often fragile compositions soaring with incredible grace."

Professional ratings
Review scores
Source	Rating
Allmusic	3.5/5 stars
The Penguin Guide to Jazz Recordings	3.5/4 stars

== Track listing ==
All compositions by John Surman.

1. "Preamble" – 4:11
2. "Groundwork" – 9:33
3. "Sea Change" – 10:14
4. "Back and Forth" – 11:51
5. "Fire" – 6:47
6. "Debased Line" – 5:02
7. "In the Shadow" – 6:56
8. "Free and Equal" – 8:47
9. "Epilogue" – 3:42

== Personnel ==
- John Surman – soprano saxophone, baritone saxophone, bass clarinet
- Jack DeJohnette – drums, piano
- London Brass – trumpet, flugelhorn, horn, trombone, euphonium, tuba
