= Adventure Playground (album) =

Studio album by John Surman
- Released: 1992
- Recorded: September 1991
- Studio: Rainbow Studio; Oslo, Norway
- Genre: Avant-garde jazz, free jazz
- Length: 63:50
- Label: ECM; ECM 1463
- Producer: Manfred Eicher

John Surman chronology
Road to Saint Ives (1990)	Adventure Playground (1992)	The Brass Project (1992)

Adventure Playground is an album by English saxophonist John Surman recorded in September 1991 and released on ECM the following year. The quartet features rhythm section Paul Bley, Gary Peacock and Tony Oxley.

== Reception ==
The AllMusic review awarded the album 4 stars.

Professional ratings
Review scores
Source	Rating
AllMusic	4/5 stars
The Penguin Guide to Jazz Recordings	4/4 stars

== Track listing ==
All compositions by John Surman except where noted.

1. "Only Yesterday" (Gary Peacock) – 8:40
2. "Fig Foot" (Paul Bley) – 4:30
3. "Quadraphonic Question" – 14:14
4. "Twice Said Once" (Bley) – 5:51
5. "Just for Now" (Tony Oxley) – 3:45
6. "As If We Knew" – 7:25
7. "Twisted Roots" – 10:16
8. "Duet for One" – 3:27
9. "Seven" (Carla Bley) – 5:42

== Personnel ==
- John Surman – soprano saxophone, baritone saxophone, bass clarinet
- Paul Bley – piano
- Gary Peacock – bass
- Tony Oxley – drums
