= Together Alone (Anthony Braxton and Joseph Jarman album) =

Studio album by Anthony Braxton and Joseph Jarman
- Released: 1974
- Recorded: December 29, 1971
- Genre: Jazz
- Length: 42:46
- Label: Delmark
- Producer: Robert G. Koester

Anthony Braxton chronology
Paris Concert (1971)	Together Alone (1974)	Donna Lee (1972)

Joseph Jarman chronology
As If It Were the Seasons (1968)	Together Alone (1971)	Egwu-Anwu (1977)

Together Alone is an album by American jazz saxophonists Joseph Jarman and Anthony Braxton, recorded in 1971 and released on the Delmark label.

== Reception ==
Professional ratings
Review scores
Source	Rating
AllMusic	3/5 stars
The Penguin Guide to Jazz Recordings	3/4 stars
The Rolling Stone Jazz Record Guide	3/5 stars
DownBeat	3/5 stars

Scott Yanow, in his review for AllMusic, calls the album a "disappointment considering the talents involved". He states "not a lot of magic or close communication occurs, and the improvisations tend to ramble."

== Track listing ==
1. "Together Alone" (Joseph Jarman) – 5:39
2. "Dawn Dance One" (Jarman) – 13:46
3. "Morning [Including Circles]" (Jarman) – 2:18
4. "Ck7 (GN) 436" – (Anthony Braxton) – 6:10
5. "SBN-A-1 66k" (Braxton) – 14:53

== Personnel ==
- Anthony Braxton – alto saxophone, contrabass clarinet, flute, piano, vocals
- Joseph Jarman – sopranino saxophone, soprano saxophone, alto saxophone, flute, synthesiser, bells, vocals
