= The Spaces in Between =

Studio album by John Surman
- Released: 2007
- Recorded: February 2006
- Studio: Propstei Sankt Gerold; Sankt Gerold, Austria
- Genre: Jazz
- Length: 61:35
- Label: ECM; ECM 1956
- Producer: Manfred Eicher

John Surman chronology
Rain on the Window (2006)	The Spaces in Between (2007)	Brewster's Rooster (2007)

The Spaces in Between is an album by English saxophonist John Surman recorded in February 2006 and released on ECM the following year.

== Reception ==
The AllMusic review by Thom Jurek awarded the album 4 stars, stating, "Surman may not record quite so regularly as he once did, but given how rich, varied, and thoroughly engaging and sumptuous this work is, we should perhaps celebrate the fact that we can savor his records rather than consume them."

Professional ratings
Review scores
Source	Rating
Allmusic	4/5 stars
The Penguin Guide to Jazz Recordings	4/4 stars

== Track listing ==
All compositions by John Surman

1. "Moonlighter" - 6:19
2. "You Never Know" - 5:24
3. "Wayfarers All" - 5:56
4. "Now and Again" - 7:25
5. "Winter Wish" - 4:27
6. "The Spaces in Between" – 8:13
7. "Now See!" - 3:06
8. "Mimosa" - 4:36
9. "Hubbub" - 3:52
10. "Where Fortune Smiles" - 4:34
11. "Leaving the Harrow" - 6:48

== Personnel ==
- John Surman – soprano saxophone, baritone saxophone, bass clarinet
- Chris Laurence – bass

=== Trans4mation ===
- Rita Manning, Patrick Kiernan – violins
- Bill Hawkes – viola
- Nick Cooper – cello
