= Brewster's Rooster =

Studio album by John Surman
- Released: June 19, 2009
- Recorded: September 2007
- Studio: Avatar, New York City
- Genre: Avant-garde jazz, post-bop
- Label: ECM; ECM 2046
- Producer: Manfred Eicher

John Surman chronology
The Spaces in Between (2006)	Brewster's Rooster (2009)	Saltash Bells (2012)

Brewster's Rooster is an album by English saxophonist John Surman with guitarist John Abercrombie, bassist Drew Gress, and drummer Jack DeJohnette, recorded in September 2007 and released on ECM in 2009.

== Reception ==
The AllMusic review by Thom Jurek awarded the album 4 stars, stating, "Brewster's Rooster is another high point in Surman's career. This studio band is as sympathetic as his working road unit, and his willingness to place the tradition in the context of his more contemporary, sometimes ambiguous harmonic explorations reveals the roots, shoots, and branches of his art and discipline."

Professional ratings
Review scores
Source	Rating
AllMusic	4/5 stars

== Track listing ==
All tracks are written by John Surman except as indicated.

No.	Title	Writer(s)	Length
1.	"Slanted Sky"	John Warren	6:33
2.	"Hilltop Dancer"		7:26
3.	"No Finesse"		6:51
4.	"Kickback"		7:24
5.	"Chelsea Bridge"	Billy Strayhorn	5:48
6.	"Haywain"		6:18
7.	"Counter Measures"		10:43
8.	"Brewster's Rooster"		6:36
9.	"Going for a Burton"		6:47

== Personnel ==
- John Surman – soprano saxophone, baritone saxophone
- John Abercrombie – guitar
- Drew Gress – double bass
- Jack DeJohnette – drums
