= Upon Reflection =

Studio album by John Surman
- Released: 1979
- Recorded: May 1979
- Studio: Talent Studio; Oslo, Norway
- Genre: Jazz
- Length: 45:04
- Label: ECM 1148
- Producer: Manfred Eicher

John Surman chronology
Sonatinas (1978)	Upon Reflection (1979)	The Amazing Adventures of Simon Simon (1981)

Upon Reflection is a solo album by English reed player and composer John Surman, recorded in May 1979 and released on ECM later that same year.

== Reception ==
The AllMusic review by Scott Yanow called the album "an atmospheric solo set that utilizes overdubbing (although leaving space for unaccompanied solo sections)... Fortunately there is enough variety in this generally quiet music to hold one's interest."

Professional ratings
Review scores
Source	Rating
AllMusic	4.5/5 stars
The Penguin Guide to Jazz	3/4 stars

== Track listing ==
All tracks are written by John Surman

Side one
No.	Title	Length
1.	"Edges of Illusion"	10:10
2.	"Filigree"	3:41
3.	"Caithness to Kerry"	3:51
4.	"Beyond a Shadow"	6:40
Total length:		24:22

Side two
No.	Title	Length
1.	"Prelude and Rustic Dance"	5:14
2.	"The Lamplighter"	6:19
3.	"Following Behind"	1:24
4.	"Constellation"	8:16
Total length:		21:13 45:35

== Personnel ==
- John Surman – soprano saxophone, baritone saxophone, bass clarinet, synthesizer
