= Saltash Bells =

Studio album by John Surman
- Released: May 25, 2012
- Recorded: June 2009
- Studio: Rainbow Studio; Oslo, Norway
- Genre: Jazz
- Length: 59:13
- Label: ECM; ECM 2266
- Producer: Manfred Eicher and John Surman

John Surman chronology
Brewster's Rooster (2009)	Saltash Bells (2012)	Songs about This and That (2013)

Saltash Bells is a solo album by the English saxophonist John Surman, recorded in June 2009 and released on ECM in 2012. After winning the Jazz FM Awards 2013 for Album of the Year, it was announced in May 2013 that the record has also won the Parliamentary Jazz Awards for Jazz Album of the Year by pointing out that on this "extraordinary solo recording" Surman's "beautiful blend of reeds and electronics summons the mists, moors and mysteries in hauntingly evocative style."

== Track listing ==
All tracks are written by John Surman

No.	Title	Length
1.	"Whistman's Wood"	6:32
2.	"Glass Flower"	3:13
3.	"On Staddon Heights"	7:32
4.	"Triadichorum"	3:36
5.	"Winter Elegy"	8:17
6.	"Ælfwin"	2:17
7.	"Saltash Bells"	10:40
8.	"Dark Reflections"	3:27
9.	"The Crooked Inn"	2:41
10.	"Sailing Westwards"	10:37

== Personnel ==
1. John Surman – soprano, tenor, and baritone saxophones; alto, bass, and contrabass clarinets; harmonica, synthesizer
