= Rain on the Window =

Studio album by John Surman and Howard Moody
- Released: 2008
- Recorded: January 2006
- Studio: Ullern Church; Oslo, Norway
- Genre: Jazz
- Length: 49:29
- Label: ECM; ECM 1986
- Producer: Manfred Eicher

John Surman chronology
Free and Equal (2001)	Rain on the Window (2008)	The Spaces in Between (2006)

Rain on the Window is an album by English saxophonist John Surman with organist Howard Moody recorded in January 2006 and released on ECM in 2008.

== Reception ==
The AllMusic review by Michael G. Nastos awarded the album 3½ stars, stating, "If the listener enjoys a variety of folk forms turned into modern music, Rain on the Window may be appropriate, used here and there for any precipitous, or sunny day."

Professional ratings
Review scores
Source	Rating
AllMusic	3.5/5 stars

== Track listing ==
All compositions by John Surman except as indicated

1. "Circum I" - 3:58
2. "Stained Glass" - 3:49
3. "The Old Dutch" - 3:30
4. "Dancing in the Loft" (Howard Moody, John Surman) - 1:53
5. "Step Lively!" (Moody, Surman) - 3:06
6. "Stone Ground" - 4:19
7. "Tierce" (Moody) - 2:59
8. "Circum II" - 2:03
9. "Rain on the Window" - 4:06
10. "Dark Reeds" (Moody, Surman) - 2:50
11. "O Waly Waly" (Traditional) - 2:43
12. "A Spring Wedding" - 3:07
13. "I'm Troubled in Mind" (Traditional) - 2:47
14. "On the Go" - 3:59
15. "Pax Vobiscum" - 4:12

== Personnel ==
- John Surman – soprano saxophone, baritone saxophone, bass clarinet
- Howard Moody – church organ
