= Music from Two Basses =

Studio album by David Holland / Barre Phillips
- Released: 1971
- Recorded: 15 February 1971
- Studio: Tonstudio Bauer; Ludwigsburg, W. Germany
- Genre: Jazz
- Length: 37:39
- Label: ECM; ECM 1011 ST
- Producer: Manfred Eicher

David Holland chronology
A.R.C. (1971)	Music from Two Basses (1971)	Improvisations for Cello and Guitar (1971)

Music from Two Basses is an album by jazz bassists Dave Holland and Barre Phillips recorded on 15 February 1971 and released on ECM later that year—Holland's second project, and Phillips' first, for the label.

== Reception ==
Professional ratings
Review scores
Source	Rating
AllMusic	5/5 stars
Tom Hull	B+
The Penguin Guide to Jazz Recordings	3/4 stars

The AllMusic review by Thom Jurek states:

This historic date features the two British [sic] bassists engaged while at the top of their powers, exploring not only tonality and the dynamic and harmonic possibilities that exist between two double basses, but also the expanded notions of how the different players' styles and musical intuitions dovetail, rather than work in opposition... There is simply no bass recording like this one, and over 30 years after its release, it is still a classic, an astonishing look at how intimate and instinctive musical communication can really be.

== Track listing ==
All tracks are written by Dave Holland except as indicated.

Side I
No.	Title	Writer(s)	Length
1.	"Improvised Piece I"		10:32
2.	"Improvised Piece II"	Holland; Phillips	7:50
Total length:			18:22

Side II
No.	Title	Writer(s)	Length
1.	"Beans"	Phillips	3:05
2.	"Raindrops"		4:10
3.	"May Be I Can Sing It for You"	Phillips	1:44
4.	"Just a Whisper"		4:54
5.	"Song for Clare"		4:54
Total length:			18:47 37:09

== Personnel ==
=== Musicians ===
- David Holland – bass, cello
- Barre Phillips – bass

=== Technical personnel ===
- Manfred Eicher – producer
- Kurt Rapp, Martin Wieland – engineer
- B. & B. Wojirsch – layout
- Vinny Golia – cover drawing
- Jörg Becker – photography
