= Such Winters of Memory =

Studio album by John Surman
- Released: 1983
- Recorded: December 1982
- Studio: Talent Studio; Oslo, Norway
- Genre: Jazz
- Length: 45:41
- Label: ECM 1254
- Producer: Manfred Eicher

John Surman chronology
The Amazing Adventures of Simon Simon (1981)	Such Winters of Memory (1983)	Withholding Pattern (1984)

Such Winters of Memory is an album by English saxophonist John Surman recorded in December 1982 and released on ECM the following year. The trio features singer Karin Krog and drummer Pierre Favre.

== Reception ==
Professional ratings
Review scores
Source	Rating
Allmusic	3/5 stars
The Penguin Guide to Jazz	3.5/4 stars

The AllMusic review by Michael G. Nastos awarded the album 3 stars.

== Track listing ==
All compositions by John Surman except where noted.

1. "Saturday Night" (Pierre Favre, Karin Krog, John Surman) – 6:12
2. "Sunday Morning" – 7:45
3. "My Friend" (Surman, Krog, Paul Rowlands) – 5:13
4. "Seaside Postcard 1951" – 6:21
5. "On the Wing Again" – 10:54
6. "Expressions" (John Coltrane) – 2:11
7. "Mother of Light/Persepolis" (Surman, Krog, Sri Aurobindo/Surman) – 7:05

== Personnel ==
- John Surman – soprano saxophone, baritone saxophone, bass clarinet, recorder, synthesizer, voice
- Karin Krog – voice, Oberheim ring modulator, tamboura
- Pierre Favre – drums
