= Private City (album) =

Studio album by John Surman
- Released: 1988
- Recorded: December 1987
- Studio: Rainbow Studio; Oslo, Norway
- Genre: Jazz
- Length: 39:57
- Label: ECM; ECM 1366
- Producer: Manfred Eicher

John Surman chronology
Withholding Pattern (1985)	Private City (1988)	Road to Saint Ives (1990)

Private City is a solo album by English saxophonist John Surman, recorded in December 1987 and released on ECM the following year.

== Reception ==
Professional ratings
Review scores
Source	Rating
AllMusic	4/5 stars
The Penguin Guide to Jazz	2.5/4 stars

AllMusic awarded the album four stars, with reviewer Michael G. Nastos stating: "This album, a fully realized project, has Surman exploiting all of the timbres and tones available to him in a manner he could not accomplish with other musicians in real time. It's a full exploration of his soul, from land, sea, and outer atmospheric galaxies, on wings of supersonic fancy and fantasy."

== Track listing ==
All compositions by John Surman.

1. "Portrait of a Romantic" – 7:03
2. "On Hubbard's Hill" – 4:33
3. "Not Love Perhaps" – 5:20
4. "Levitation" – 4:06
5. "Undernote" – 2:44
6. "The Wanderer" – 5:46
7. "Roundelay" – 5:15
8. "The Wizard's Song" – 8:51

== Personnel ==
- John Surman – baritone and soprano saxophones, bass clarinet, recorder, piano, synthesizer
