= 68 Million Shades... =

Studio album by Spring Heel Jack
- Released: 1996
- Genres: Jungle, drum and bass
- Label: Trade2/Island
- Producers: John Coxon, Ashley Wales

Spring Heel Jack chronology
| There are Strings (1995) | 68 Million Shades... (1996) | Versions (1996) |

68 Million Shades... is the second album by the English musical duo Spring Heel Jack, released in 1996. It was released in the United States in February 1997. The duo supported the album with a North American tour that included shows opening for Orbital. "Midwest" was released as a single.

== Production ==
The album was produced by the duo, John Coxon and Ashley Wales. They recorded from Monday to Friday, mostly from 11 in the morning until 6 in the evening. The duo felt that they complemented each other in the studio, with Wales the more easygoing of the two. They strove to create an album interesting enough to be enjoyed at home, divorced from nightlife and stimulants; they found that they kept adding musical elements to any attempt at a "regular" dance track. Coxon and Wales considered Ennio Morricone and Brian Eno to be among their primary influences. The duo produced a disc of remixes of the album, Versions.

== Critical reception ==
Professional ratings
Review scores
| Source | Rating |
|---|---|
| AllMusic | 4/5 stars |
| The Atlanta Journal-Constitution | 3/4 stars |
| Robert Christgau | A |
| Los Angeles Times | 2.5/4 stars |

The Guardian noted that "Spring Heel Jack are routinely described in the music press as studio geniuses, but this sleekly produced masterwork suggests that a state-of-the-art studio has booted out the mere humans and set its own controls for the heart of the sun." Robert Christgau called the album "prog jungle," writing that Wales and Coxon "recontextualize drum 'n' bass's redolent lingo—its triple-time superdrum pitta-pat, its impossible deep tremblors that modulate whole power plants in repose—by subsuming densely frenetic techno cum dancehall in a witting synthesis of electronic composition and another of Wales's passions, On the Corner-era Miles Davis." The New York Times said that the duo "merges strings and horns that sound as if they come from movie soundtracks with a beat that can fluidly change from a rapid-fire drum-machine roll to a conga rhythm."

Entertainment Weekly concluded that "the record has moments of airy, disquieting tranquility... But it could double as Muzak for a department store’s Gen-X section." The Atlanta Journal-Constitution determined that Spring Heel Jack "is equally an inheritor of punk's do-it-yourself aesthetic and 1950s 'exotica' auteur Les Baxter's distinctly mondo notions about mood music." Rolling Stone stated: "Surrounding their break beats with a reverberating drone, Spring Heel sample sweeping strings, elastic saxophone, sitar, car horns, steel guitar, piano and trumpet, as well as cryptic, treated sounds, into a reverberating clamor that is equally tuneful and enigmatic." Spin included 68 Million Shades... on its list of "The 10 Best Albums You Didn't Hear in '96".

AllMusic wrote that the album "continues the duo's dense, dub-inspired take on jungle."

== Track listing ==
| No. | Title | Length |
|---|---|---|
| 1. | "Take 1" |
| 2. | "Midwest" |
| 3. | "60 Seconds" |
| 4. | "Plan" |
| 5. | "Plates" |
| 6. | "Bar" |
| 7. | "Eesti" |
| 8. | "Roger Tessier" |
| 9. | "Island" |
| 10. | "Suspensions" |
| 11. | "Take 2" |
| 12. | "Take 3" |
