= Road to Saint Ives =

Studio album by John Surman
- Released: 1990
- Recorded: April 1990
- Studio: Rainbow Studio; Oslo, Norway
- Genre: Jazz
- Length: 53:14
- Label: ECM; ECM 1418
- Producer: Manfred Eicher

John Surman chronology
Private City (1986)	Road to Saint Ives (1990)	Adventure Playground (1991)

Road to Saint Ives is a solo album by the English saxophonist John Surman, recorded in April 1990 and released on ECM the following year.

== Reception ==
The AllMusic review by Stacia Proefrock called the album "a gentle, introspective, yet adventurous solo work... The entire album is a one-man effort, from the composition to all of the instrumentation, with Surman building strata of sound over keyboard and percussion structures using bass clarinet and the soprano and bass saxophones he is known for. The resulting work communicates a unique vision and mood, unsullied by the conflicting interpretations of other performers."

Professional ratings
Review scores
Source	Rating
AllMusic	4/5 stars
The Encyclopedia of Popular Music	5/5 stars
The Penguin Guide to Jazz	3.5/4 stars

== Track listing ==
All compositions by John Surman.

1. "Polperro" – 2:06
2. "Tintagel" – 12:10
3. "Trethevy Quoit" – 0:53
4. "Rame Head" – 4:39
5. "Mevagissey" – 6:50
6. "Lostwithiel" – 1:25
7. "Perranporth" – 1:58
8. "Bodmin Moor" – 6:40
9. "Kelly Bray" – 1:22
10. "Piperspool" – 5:08
11. "Marazion" – 2:35
12. "Bedruthan Steps" – 7:28

== Personnel ==
- John Surman – soprano saxophone, baritone saxophone, bass clarinet, keyboards, percussion
