= Tales of the Algonquin =

Studio album by John Surman, John Warren
- Released: 1971
- Genre: Jazz
- Length: 47:34
- Label: Deram
- Producer: Peter Eden

John Surman chronology
Conflagration (1970)	Tales of the Algonquin (1971)	By Contact (1971)

Tales of the Algonquin is an album by jazz saxophonists John Surman and John Warren recorded in 1971 and released on the Deram label.

== Reception ==
Professional ratings
Review scores
Source	Rating
Allmusic	3/5 stars
All About Jazz	(not rated)
Penguin Guide to Jazz	👑

John Kelman in his All About Jazz review states: "The music ranges from brashly swinging full-section charts like 'With Terry's Help,' where Surman's powerful soprano solo demonstrates just how quickly he'd evolved into a singular voice, to the more delicately balladic and Gil Evans-inflected 'The Dandelion'. Despite the scripting inherent in this kind of large ensemble work, there's a refreshing looseness and sense of unfettered exploration throughout."

== Track listing ==
All tracks are written by John Warren.

Side one
No.	Title	Length
1.	"With Terry's Help"
2.	"The Dandelion"
3.	"We'll Make It"
4.	"The Picture Tree"

All tracks are written by John Warren.

Side two
No.	Title	Length
5.	"Tales of the Algonquin": i. "The Purple Swan"; ii. "Shingebis and the North Wind"; iii. "The Adventures of Manabrush"; iv. "The White Water Lily"; v. "Wihio the Wanderer"

== Personnel ==
Musicians

- Martin Drover – trumpet, flugelhorn
- Kenny Wheeler – trumpet, flugelhorn
- Harry Beckett – trumpet, flugelhorn
- Malcolm Griffiths – trombone
- Ed Harvey – trombone
- Danny Almark – trombone
- Mike Osborne – alto saxophone, clarinet
- Stan Sulzmann – alto saxophone, soprano saxophone, flute
- Alan Skidmore – tenor saxophone, flute, alto flute
- John Surman – baritone saxophone, soprano saxophone
- John Warren – baritone saxophone, flute, soprano saxophone
- John Taylor – piano
- Harry Miller – bass
- Barre Phillips – bass
- Alan Jackson – drums
- Stu Martin – drums
