= Proverbs and Songs =

Live album by John Surman
- Released: 1997
- Recorded: 1 June 1996
- Genre: Jazz
- Length: 49:28
- Label: ECM; ECM 1639
- Producer: Derek Drescher

John Surman chronology
A Biography of the Rev. Absalom Dawe (1995)	Proverbs and Songs (1997)	Coruscating (1999)

Proverbs and Songs is a live album by the English saxophonist John Surman recorded at Salisbury Cathedral on June 1, 1996 with organist John Taylor and the 75-strong Salisbury Festival Chorus and released on ECM the following year, consisting a suite of choral settings of Old Testament texts.

== Background ==
It was nominated for the Mercury Music Prize in 1998. Surman performed the suite several times after the 1996 performance.

== Reception ==
Professional ratings
Review scores
Source	Rating
AllMusic	2.5/5 stars
The Penguin Guide to Jazz Recordings	3/4 stars

The AllMusic review awarded the album 2.5 stars. Alyn Shipton wrote that Surman's "unaccompanied choral writing was rich and unusual and elsewhere the sense of jazz rhythm and forward motion came almost exclusively from his saxophone, creating rich ostinatos, or swirling aggressively among the choral parts."

== Track listing ==
All lyrics are from Old Testament; all music is composed by John Surman.

No.	Title	Length
1.	"Prelude"	3:11
2.	"The Sons"	4:55
3.	"The Kings"	6:41
4.	"Wisdom"	7:39
5.	"Job"	4:50
6.	"No Twilight"	7:42
7.	"Pride"	5:00
8.	"The Proverbs"	4:06
9.	"Abraham Arise!"	5:24
Total length:		49:28

== Personnel ==
- John Surman – soprano and baritone saxophones, bass clarinet
- John Taylor – organ
- Howard Moody – conductor
  - Salisbury Festival Chorus
