= The Amazing Adventures of Simon Simon =

Studio album by John Surman
- Released: October 26, 1981
- Recorded: January 1981
- Studio: Talent Studio; Oslo, Norway
- Genre: Jazz
- Length: 44:35
- Label: ECM 1193
- Producer: Manfred Eicher

John Surman chronology
Upon Reflection (1979)	The Amazing Adventures of Simon Simon (1981)	Such Winters of Memory (1983)

Professional ratings
Review scores
Source	Rating
AllMusic	3/5 stars
The Encyclopedia of Popular Music	5/5 stars
The Penguin Guide to Jazz	4/4 stars

The Amazing Adventures of Simon Simon is an album by British saxophonist John Surman—featuring drummer Jack DeJohnette—recorded in January 1981 and released on ECM later that year.

== Reception ==
The album cover was chosen by designer Storm Thorgerson as one of 100 best album covers.

== Track list ==
All tracks are written by John Surman except as noted.

No.	Title	Writer(s)	Length
1.	"Part I: Nestor's Saga (The Tale of the Ancient)"		10:51
2.	"Part II: The Buccaneers"		4:03
3.	"Part III: Kentish Hunting (Lady Margaret's Air)"	Traditional; John Surman (arr.)	3:01
4.	"Part IV: The Pilgrim's Way (To the Seventeen Walls)"	Surman; Jack DeJohnette	5:49
5.	"Part V: Within the Halls of Neptune"		4:00
6.	"Part VI: Phoenix and the Fire"	Surman; DeJohnette	6:18
7.	"Part VII: Fide et Amore (By Faith and Love)"	Surman; DeJohnette	4:50
8.	"Part VIII: Merry Pranks (The Jester's Song)"		2:56
9.	"Part IX: A Fitting Epitaph"		3:22
Total length:			44:35

== Personnel ==
- John Surman – baritone saxophone, soprano saxophone, bass clarinet, synthesizer
- Jack DeJohnette – drums, congas, electric piano

=== Production ===
- Manfred Eicher – producer
- Jan Erik Kongshaug – engineer
- Susan Nash – design
- Christian Vogt – cover photo
- Gérard Amsellem – liner photo
