= Pantages Playhouse Theatre =

Theatre in Winnipeg, Manitoba, Canada

Coordinates: 49.8989°N 97.1379°W

- Théâtre Pantages Playhouse
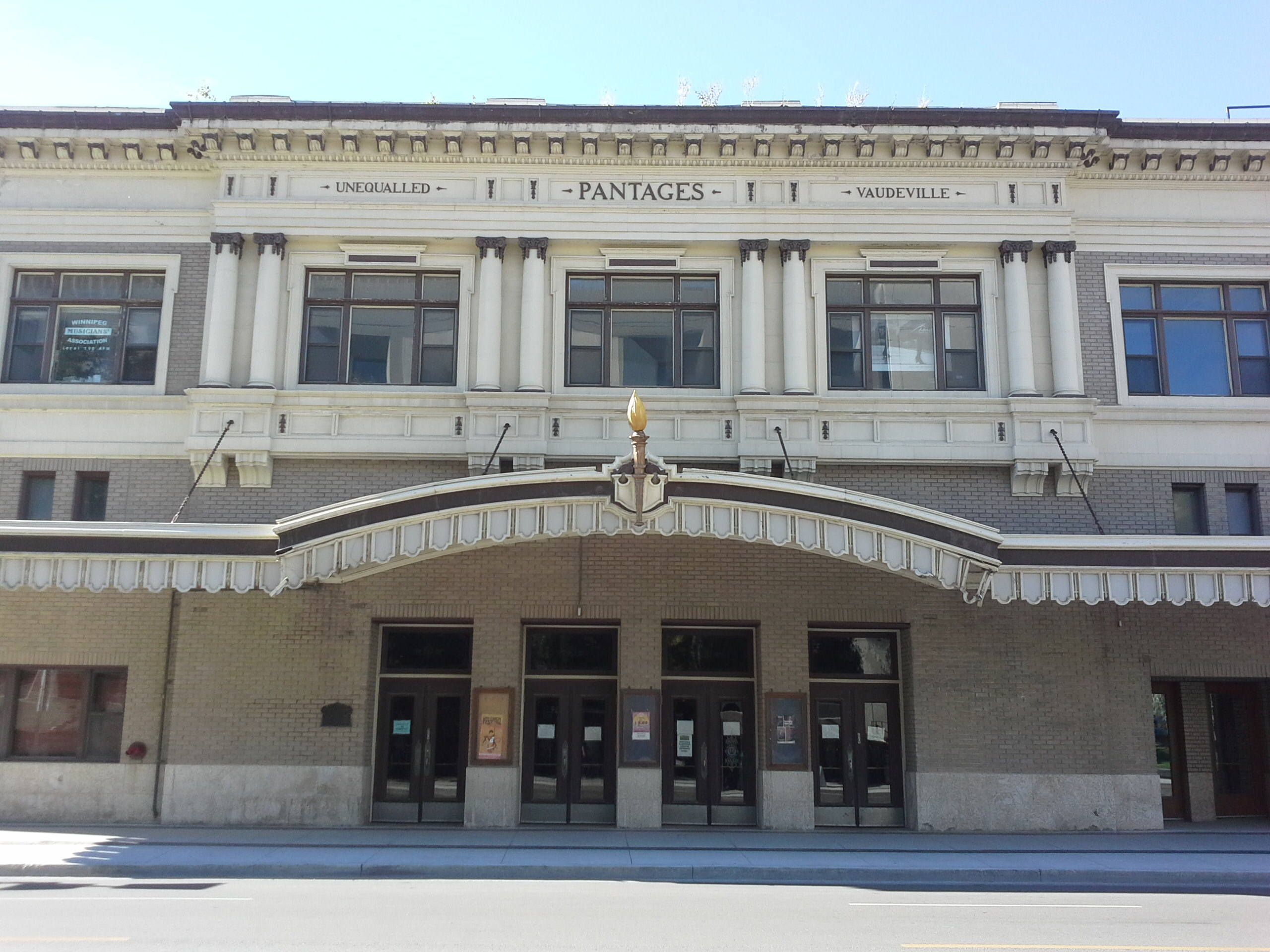
- Interactive map of Pantages Playhouse Theatre
- Location: 180 Market Avenue East; Winnipeg, Manitoba, Canada; R3B 0P7
- Owner: City of Winnipeg
- Capacity: 1,475
- Designation

National Historic Site of Canada
- Official name: Pantages Playhouse Theatre National Historic Site of Canada
- Designated: 15 November 1985

Municipally Designated Site
- Designation: Winnipeg Landmark Heritage Structure
- Recognized: October 1, 2004
- CRHP listing: May 18, 2007
- Recognition authority: City of Winnipeg
- ID: 7367
- Public transit: Winnipeg Transit; FX2 FX3 F8 D16 43

Construction
- Opened: 9 February 1914
- Architects: George W. Northwood and B. Marcus Priteca

The Pantages Playhouse Theatre (French: Théâtre Pantages Playhouse) is a former vaudeville theatre in downtown Winnipeg, Manitoba, Canada.

The two-storey building features a decorative façade with a lit marquee across the front, as well as classical decorative elements such as columns, brackets, frieze and cornice. The building continues to feature original interior layout and original lobby decor such as marble sheathing and decorative plaster ceiling.

Of the 75 theatres once found in Pantages' chain, the theatre in Winnipeg is one of the few that have survived.

== History ==
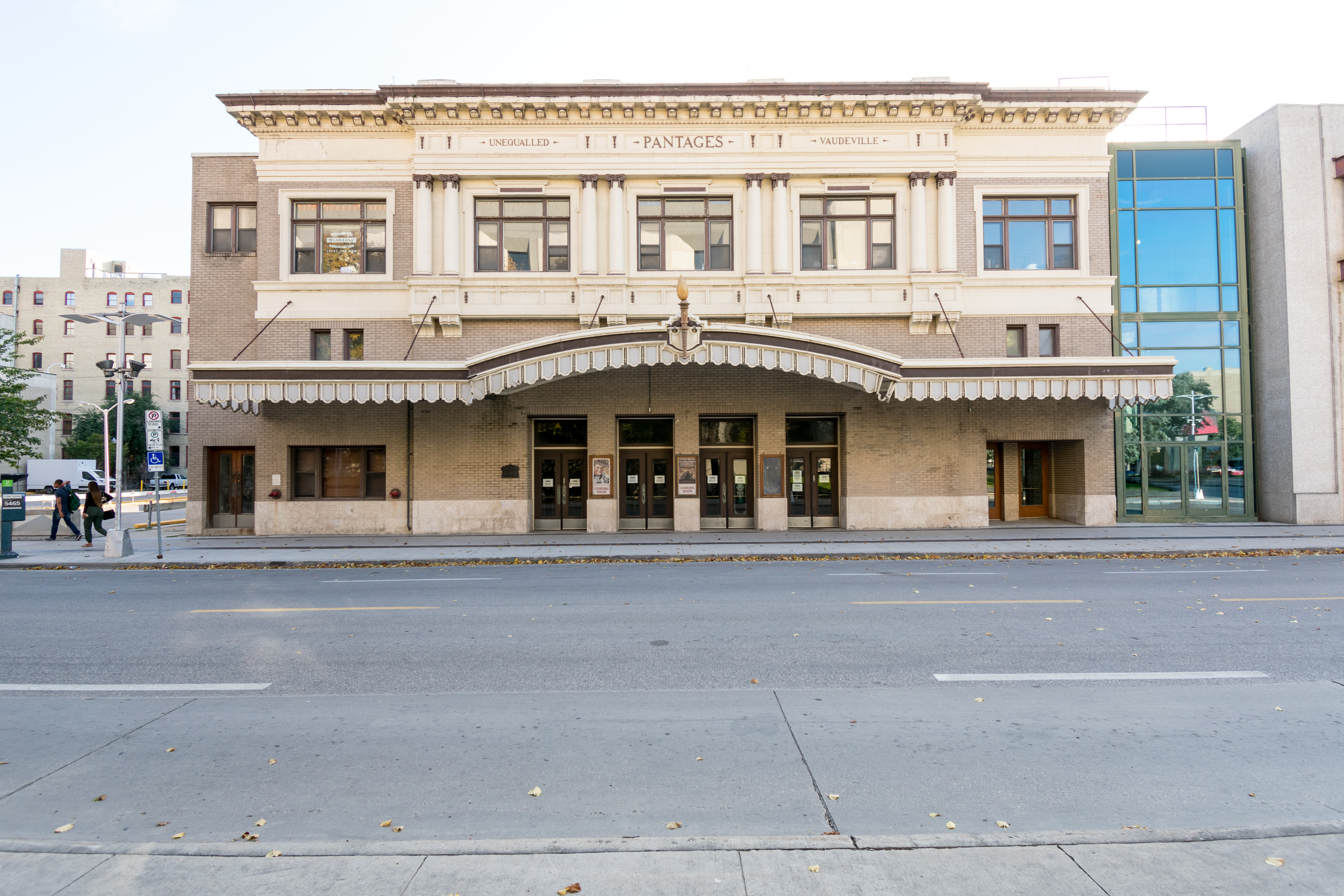
Pantages Playhouse Theatre in downtown Winnipeg

Built in 1913–1914 and opened on 9 February 1914 as the Pantages Theatre, the building is located in Winnipeg's Exchange District. It was the ninth to be built among that company's eighty-six theatres, and was designed by architects George W. Northwood and B. Marcus Priteca. The Pantages company, a major American vaudeville chain, built the facility to present live theatrical, musical and vaudeville performances, including live performances by Buster Keaton, Ella Fitzgerald, Stan Laurel and many others. Winnipeg was a proving ground for performers. Alexander Pantages was quoted as saying, "all my acts originate in Winnipeg and move around the circuit."

The theatre was host to the first ever jazz concert in Canada when the Creole Band performed here in 1914. The performance was the first ever jazz concert outside the United States and the beginnings of jazz as an international movement.

In 1923, the theatre company moved to the Capitol Theatre, and the city of Winnipeg acquired the building, renaming it Playhouse Theatre and using it as a venue for live theatre. The last vaudeville show in the Pantages Theatre was 23 June 1923. The conversion to live theatre was not successful, and it eventually reverted to a format of vaudeville, tabloid musicals and motion pictures.

The Royal Winnipeg Ballet made its premier performance on the building's stage in June 1940 and continued there until the Manitoba Centennial Concert Hall was constructed in 1967.

The City Finance Committee sold the building in 1943 to a new owner intent on using it for vaudeville and motion pictures, but the city seized it for taxes in 1945. In 1948, the theatre began to feature amateur performers and spawned the Manitoba Theatre Centre in 1956.

In the 1980s, the theatre's auditorium was repainted, and the seating and draperies were replaced by salvage from a cinema. In 1993, under a tripartite agreement with the Provincial and Federal Governments, the City of Winnipeg acquired the Main Street frontage and added a new entrance and lobby to the theatre, as well as adding improvements to the backstage.

The Performing Arts Consortium of Winnipeg, Inc. assumed responsibility for the management of the theatre in February 1998.

The City of Winnipeg agreed to sell the theatre to Alex Boersma and Lars Nicholson in 2019 for $530,000, although the sale was held up on account of negotiations for easements to retain a monument to the 1919 Winnipeg general strike on the corner of Main Street and Market Avenue. In July 2020, the theatre was then sold to the Performing Arts Coalition (PAC) for $1, with Boersma's company retaining a slice of land alongside the theatre for housing development. PAC intends to raise between $10 million and $15 million to restore the historic venue and install a management team to operate it.
