= Withholding Pattern =

Studio album by John Surman
- Released: 1985
- Recorded: December 1984
- Studio: Rainbow Studio; Oslo, Norway
- Genre: Jazz
- Length: 42:36
- Label: ECM 1295
- Producer: Manfred Eicher

John Surman chronology
Such Winters of Memory (1982)	Withholding Pattern (1985)	Private City (1987)

Professional ratings
Review scores
Source	Rating
Allmusic	4/5 stars
The Penguin Guide to Jazz	3/4 stars

Withholding Pattern is a solo album by English jazz musician John Surman recorded in December 1984 and released on ECM the following year.

== Reception ==
AllMusic awarded the album 4 stars and its review by Ron Wynn states: "Saxophone workout from '85 by outstanding British player John Surman. While solo sax can be extremely tiring, Surman mixes enough elements of rock, free, blues, and hard bop to keep the songs varied. His aggressive style, especially on baritone, keeps the energy level high."

== Track listing ==
All compositions by John Surman.

1. "Doxology" – 6:02
2. "Changes of Season" – 9:30
3. "All Cat's Whiskers and Bee's Knees" – 2:59
4. "Holding Pattern I" – 5:02
5. "Skating on Thin Ice" – 4:53
6. "The Snooper" – 1:59
7. "Wildcat Blues" – 3:48
8. "Holding Pattern II" – 8:17

== Personnel ==
- John Surman – baritone and soprano saxophones, bass clarinet, recorder, piano, synthesizer
