= A Biography of the Rev. Absalom Dawe =

Studio album by John Surman
- Released: 1995
- Recorded: October 1994
- Genre: Jazz
- Length: 49:45
- Label: ECM; ECM 1528
- Producer: Manfred Eicher

John Surman chronology
Nordic Quartet (1994)	A Biography of the Rev. Absalom Dawe (1995)	Proverbs and Songs (1997)

A Biography of the Rev. Absalom Dawe is a solo album by English saxophonist John Surman, recorded in October 1994 and released on ECM the following year.

== Reception ==
The Penguin Guide to Jazz Recordings included the album in its suggested “core collection” of essential recordings.

The AllMusic review by Stacia Proefrock stated: "John Surman is an artist with an amazing range and depth of style, from contemporary classical to jazz to electronic music. In few places is this more evident than on A Biography of the Rev. Absalom Dawe, on which Surman acts as a sort of one-man wind chamber ensemble... Elements of modern composition, jazz, and European folk can be heard throughout and the mood is one of reflection and wintry quiet. Overall, this is one of Surman's most daring and yet most successful projects to date."

Professional ratings
Review scores
Source	Rating
AllMusic	4.5/5 stars
The Penguin Guide to Jazz Recordings	3.5/4 stars

== Track listing ==
All tracks are written by John Surman.

No.	Title	Length
1.	"First Light"	2:41
2.	"Countless Journeys"	7:31
3.	"A Monastic Calling"	5:53
4.	"Druid's Circle"	2:44
5.	"'Twas But Piety"	7:21
6.	"Three Aspects"	2:50
7.	"The Long Narrow Road"	2:46
8.	"Wayfarer"	9:28
9.	"The Far Corners"	6:34
10.	"An Image"	1:25
Total length:		49:45

== Personnel ==
- John Surman – soprano and baritone saxophone, alto and bass clarinets, keyboards
