= Journal Violone II =

Studio album by Barre Phillips
- Released: 1980
- Recorded: June 1979
- Studio: Tonstudio Bauer; Ludwigsburg West Germany
- Genre: Jazz
- Length: 39:45
- Label: ECM 1149
- Producer: Manfred Eicher

Barre Phillips chronology
Three Day Moon (1979)	Journal Violone II (1980)	Music by... (1980)

Journal Violone II is an album by bassist Barre Phillips recorded in June 1979 and released on ECM the following year. The trio features reed player John Surman and singer Aina Kemanis.

== Reception ==
Allmusic review awarded the album 3 stars.

Professional ratings
Review scores
Source	Rating
Allmusic	3/5 stars
The Penguin Guide to Jazz Recordings	3/4 stars

== Track listing ==
All compositions by Barre Phillips

1. "Part I" - 7:10
2. "Part II" - 6:19
3. "Part III" - 5:02
4. "Part IV (To Aquirix Aida)" - 6:45
5. "Part V" - 3:26
6. "Part VI" - 11:03

== Personnel ==
- Barre Phillips – bass
- John Surman – soprano saxophone. baritone saxophone, bass clarinet, synthesizer
- Aina Kemanis – voice
