= Disappeared (album) =

Studio album by Spring Heel Jack
- Released: 22 August 2000
- Label: Thirsty Ear
- Producer: Spring Heel Jack

Spring Heel Jack chronology
Treader (1999)	Disappeared (2000)	Masses (2001)

Professional ratings
Aggregate scores
Source	Rating
Metacritic	71/100
Review scores
Source	Rating
AllMusic	4.5/5 stars
NME	(7/10)
Pitchfork	7.7/10
Robert Christgau	(2-star Honorable Mention)

Disappeared is an album by English electronic duo Spring Heel Jack. The album was released by Thirsty Ear on 22 August 2000.

== Critical reception ==
Disappeared was met with "generally favorable" reviews from critics. At Metacritic, which assigns a weighted average rating out of 100 to reviews from mainstream publications, this release received an average score of 71, based on 11 reviews.

Keyboard wrote that Spring Heel Jack "slams together big beats and distorted industrial sampies in an all-instrumental collage that's both fresh and unpretentious." The Times called the album "an inventive exercise which sees [the band] vaulting across a dozen different genres," writing that "[Ashley] Wales's elastic trumpet talents are a constant, occasionally complemented by guest clarinet, but it's the clatter of breakbeats that dominates."

== Track listing ==
1. "Rachel Point" (John Coxon, Ashley Wales) – 6:31
2. "Mit Wut" (Coxon, Wales) – 7:06
3. "Disappeared 1" (Coxon, John Surman, Wales) – 6:14
4. "Bane" (Coxon, Wales) – 4:34
5. "Galina" (Coxon, Wales) – 7:14
6. "Trouble and Luck" (Coxon, Wales) – 5:49
7. "I Undid Myself" (Coxon, Wales) – 4:25
8. "Lester" (Coxon, Wales) – 1:30
9. "To Die a Little" (Coxon, Wales) – 3:14
10. "Disappeared 2" (Coxon, Surman, Wales) – 4:59
11. "Wolfing" (Coxon, Wales) – 5:30
