= Improvisations for Cello and Guitar =

Live album by David Holland / Derek Bailey
- Released: October 15, 1971
- Recorded: January 1971
- Venue: Little Theatre Club; London, England
- Genre: Jazz, free improvisation
- Length: 38:28
- Label: ECM ECM 1013 ST
- Producer: Manfred Eicher

David Holland chronology
Music from Two Basses (1971)	Improvisations for Cello and Guitar (1971)	Conference of the Birds (1973)

Derek Bailey chronology
The Music Improvisation Company (1970)	Improvisations for Cello and Guitar (1971)	Solo Guitar (1971)

Improvisations for Cello and Guitar is an album of free improvisation by bassist Dave Holland on cello and guitarist Derek Bailey recorded at the Little Theatre Club in London in January 1971 and released on ECM October later that year—Holland’s third release for the label.

== Reception ==
Professional ratings
Review scores
Source	Rating
AllMusic	3/5 stars

AllMusic awarded the album 3 stars.

Todd S. Jenkins called the album "a dark resonant masterwork."

== Track listing ==
All tracks are written by Dave Holland & Derek Bailey.

Side I
No.	Title	Length
1.	"Improvised Piece III"	20:04
Total length:		20:04

Side II
No.	Title	Length
1.	"Improvised Piece IV"	8:16
2.	"Improvised Piece V"	10:08
Total length:		18:24 38:28

== Personnel ==
=== Musicians ===
- David Holland – cello
- Derek Bailey – guitar

=== Technical personnel ===
- B & B Wojirsch – layout
- David Holland – cover design
