= Mountainscapes =

Studio album by Barre Phillips
- Released: 1976
- Recorded: March 1976
- Studio: Tonstudio Bauer; Ludwigsburg, W. Germany
- Genre: Jazz
- Length: 37:21
- Label: ECM; ECM 1076 ST
- Producer: Manfred Eicher

Barre Phillips chronology
For All It Is (1973)	Mountainscapes (1976)	Three Day Moon (1979)

Mountainscapes is an album by American jazz bassist Barre Phillips recorded in March 1976 and released on ECM later that year. Phillips's quartet features reed player John Surman, Dieter Feichtner on synthesizer, and drummer Stu Martin, with a guest appearance from guitarist John Abercrombie.

== Reception ==
Professional ratings
Review scores
Source	Rating
AllMusic	3/5 stars
The Rolling Stone Jazz Record Guide	4/5 stars
The Penguin Guide to Jazz Recordings	4/4 stars

The AllMusic review awarded the album 3 stars.

== Track listing ==
All tracks are written by Barre Phillips, Dieter Feichtner, John Surman and Stu Martin.

Side I
No.	Title	Length
1.	"Mountainscape I"	5:54
2.	"Mountainscape II"	2:45
3.	"Mountainscape III"	4:21
4.	"Mountainscape IV"	4:25
Total length:		17:25

Side II
No.	Title	Length
1.	"Mountainscape V"	4:50
2.	"Mountainscape VI"	4:33
3.	"Mountainscape VII"	3:21
4.	"Mountainscape VIII"	7:12
Total length:		19:56 37:21

== Personnel ==
=== Musicians ===
- Barre Phillips – bass
- John Surman – soprano and baritone saxophones, bass clarinet, synthesizer
- Dieter Feichtner – synthesizer
- Stu Martin – drums, synthesizer

==== Additional musician(s) ====
- John Abercrombie – guitar (track 8)

=== Technical personnel ===
- Manfred Eicher – producer
- Martin Wieland – recording engineer
- Frieder Grindler – cover design
