= Aquarian Rain =

Studio album by Barre Phillips
- Released: 1992
- Recorded: May 1991
- Studio: Rainbow Studio; Oslo, Norway
- Genre: Jazz
- Length: 53:01
- Label: ECM; ECM 1451
- Producer: Manfred Eicher

Barre Phillips chronology
Arcus (1989)	Aquarian Rain (1992)	No Pieces (1992)

Aquarian Rain is an album by bassist Barre Phillips recorded in May 1991 and released on ECM the following year. The quartet features James Giroudon and Jean-François Estager on tape manipulation and percussionist Alain Joule.

== Reception ==
AllMusic review awarded the album 2 stars.

Professional ratings
Review scores
Source	Rating
AllMusic	2/5 stars
The Penguin Guide to Jazz Recordings	3/4 stars

== Track listing ==
All compositions by Jean-François Estagér, James Giroudon, Alain Joule and Barre Phillips except as indicated

1. "Bridging" (Alain Joule, Barre Phillips) - 5:21
2. "The Flow" - 4:04
3. "Ripples Edge" (Joule, Phillips) - 5:37
4. "Inbetween I and E" - 9:28
5. "Ebb" (Phillips) - 1:54
6. "Promenade de Memoire" (Joule) - 8:02
7. "Eddies" (Joule, Phillips) - 2:48
8. "Early Tide" - 7:09
9. "Water Shed" (Phillips) - 3:05
10. "Aquarian Rain" - 6:05

== Personnel ==
- Barre Phillips – bass
- James Giroudon, Jean-François Estager – tape
- Alain Joule – percussion
