= Music by... =

Studio album by Barre Phillips
- Released: 1980
- Recorded: May 1980
- Studio: Tonstudio Bauer; Ludwigsburg, West Germany
- Genre: Jazz
- Label: ECM 1178
- Producer: Manfred Eicher

Barre Phillips chronology
Journal Violone II (1979)	Music by... (1980)	Call Me When You Get There (1983)

Music by... is an album by American jazz bassist Barre Phillips recorded in May 1980 and released on ECM Records later that year. The sextet features singers Aina Kemanis and Claudia Phillips, saxophonists John Surman and Hervé Bourde, and drummer Pierre Favre.

== Track listing ==
All compositions by Barre Phillips except as indicated

1. "Twitter" - 6:18
2. "Angleswaite" - 8:49
3. "Pirthrite" - 5:29
4. "Longview" - 7:35
5. "Entai" - 3:00
6. "Double Treble" (Barre Phillips, Hervé Bourde) - 3:02
7. "Elvid Kursong" - 6:47

== Personnel ==
- Barre Phillips – bass
- Aina Kemanis, Claudia Phillips – voice
- John Surman – soprano saxophone, baritone saxophone, bass clarinet
- Hervé Bourde – alto saxophone, tenor saxophone, flutes
- Pierre Favre – drums, percussion
