= Spring Heel Jack =

English electronic music duo

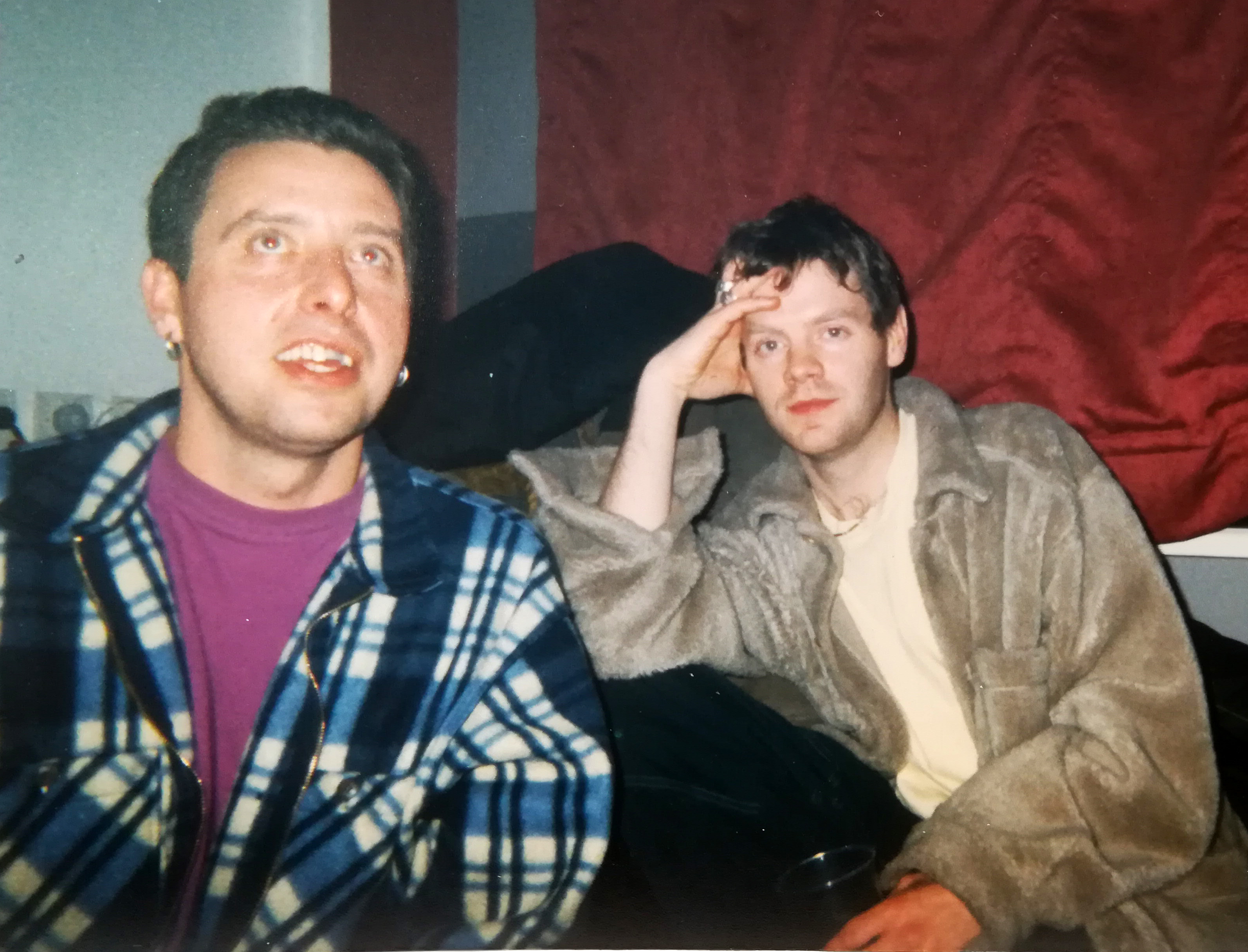
- Spring Heel Jack (Ashley Wales and John Coxon), 25 January 1996, Tartu, Estonia (Club Illusioon)

Background information
- Origin: London, England
- Genres: Drum and bass; free jazz; electronic
- Years active: 1994–present
- Labels: Treader
- Members: Ashley Wales; John Coxon

Spring Heel Jack is an English electronic music duo, consisting of John Coxon and Ashley Wales.

Formed in 1993 in London, England, Spring Heel Jack began their career exploring drum and bass and jungle, but have since branched out into free improvisation and jazz, collaborating with many musicians from Europe and the United States.

== History ==
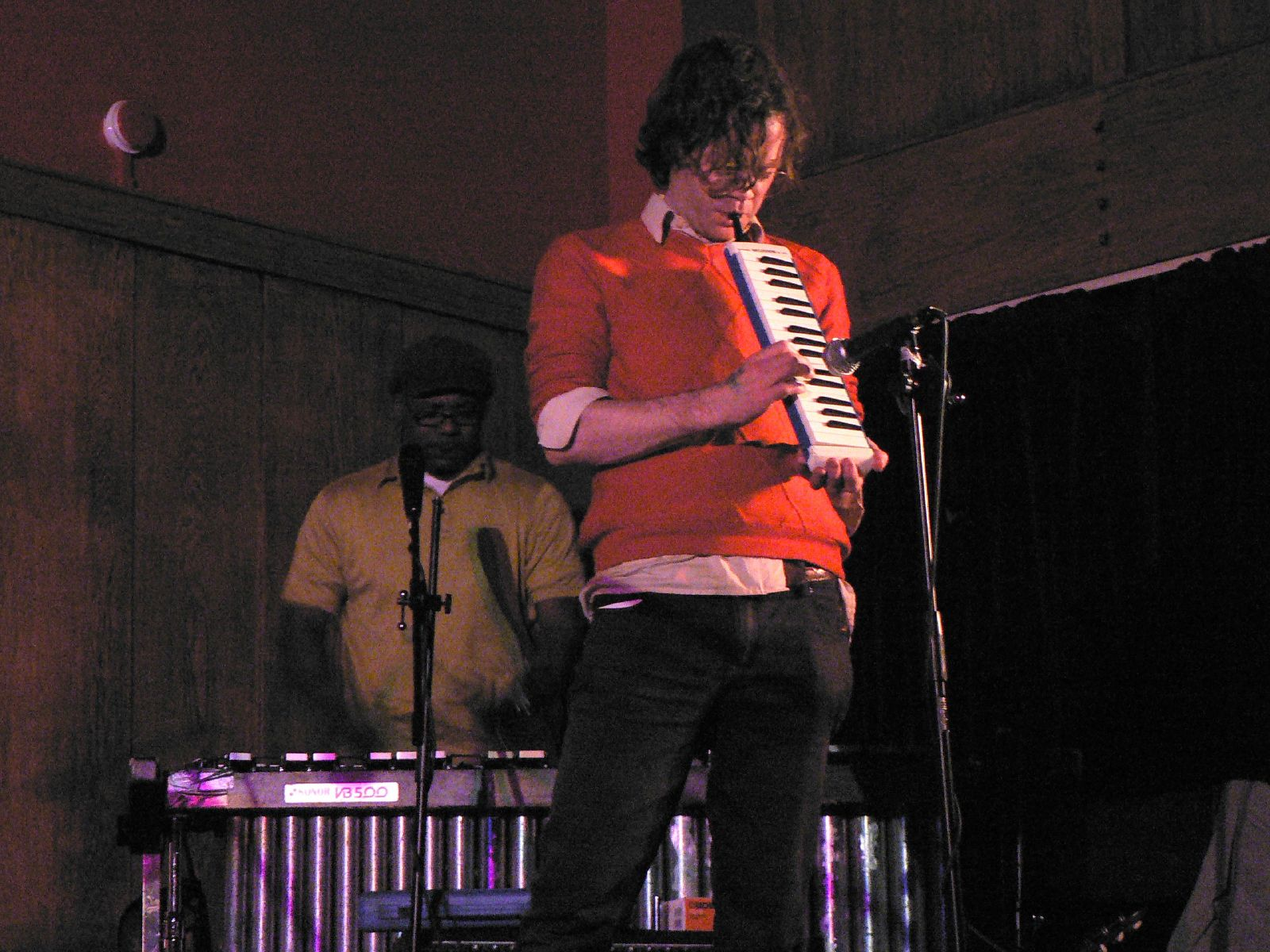
John Coxon (2007)

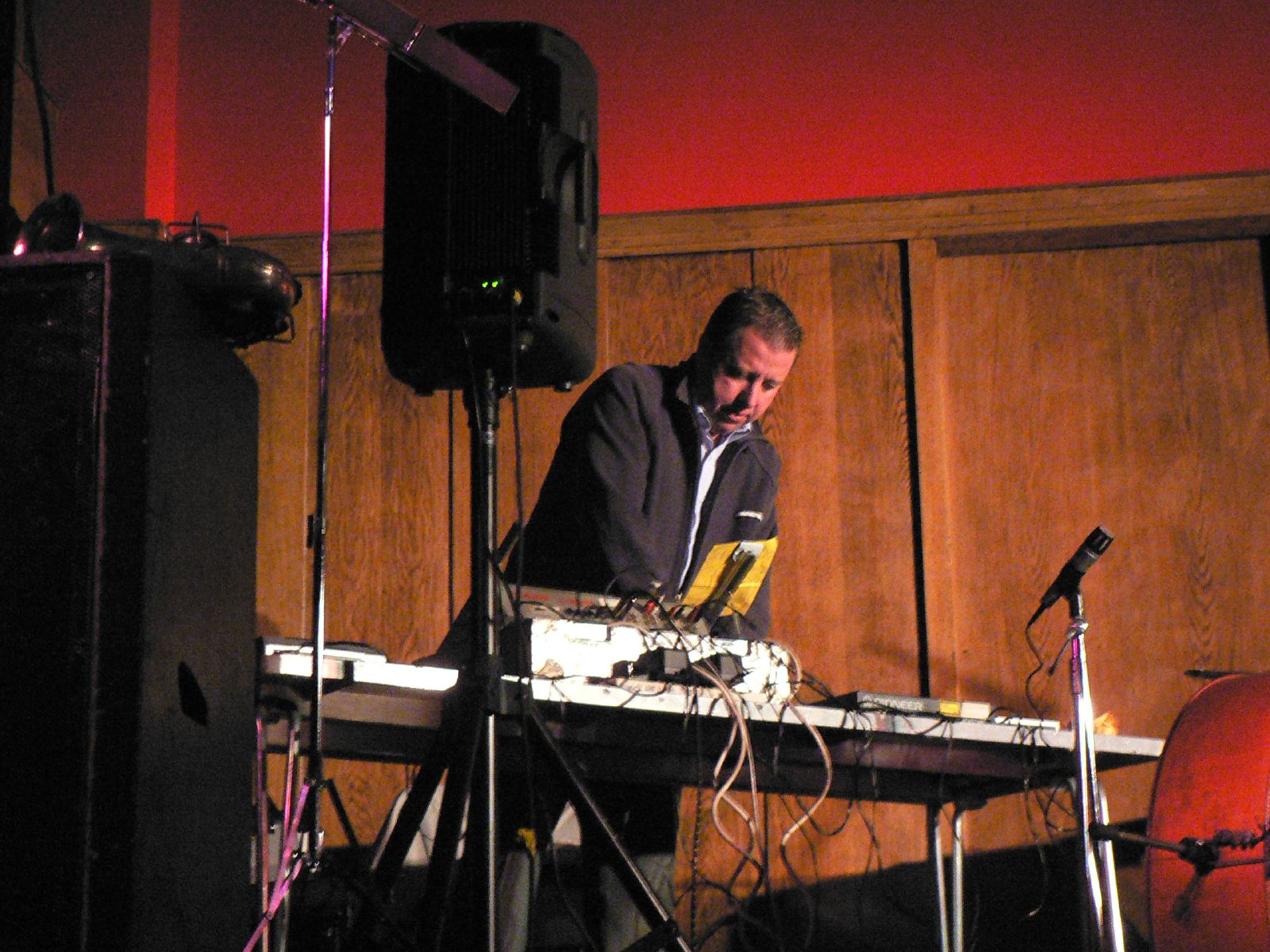
Ashley Wales (2007)

Wales was formerly a composer of contemporary classical music and leader of the band Crazy About Love, while Coxon was a successful remixer and producer (most notably for Betty Boo) prior to their joining forces.

Their first three drum and bass albums released during the 1990s earned positive reviews for their innovative take on the genre. They also co-wrote and produced the 1996 track "Walking Wounded", a major UK hit for Everything But The Girl featuring Ben Watt who had earlier been sacked from Crazy About Love.

The cinematic Disappeared (2000) marked a transition for Wales and Coxon, and featured the British saxophonist John Surman, whose appearance was a harbinger of later changes.

Masses (2001), the first of several albums for the cross-genre Blue Series on Thirsty Ear, was an even more radical departure. Collaborators included saxophonists Evan Parker, John Tchicai and Tim Berne; bassist William Parker; trumpeters Roy Campbell, Kenny Wheeler and Wadada Leo Smith; trombonist Paul Rutherford; drummer Han Bennink; pianist Matthew Shipp; and guitarist Jason Pierce.

In 2006 Coxon and Wales began to operate a record label, Treader, releasing CDs by themselves and other associated artists, including some of their recent collaborators.

== Selected discography ==
Albums

- There are Strings (1995)
- 68 Million Shades... (1996)
- Versions (1996)
- Busy, Curious, Thirsty (1997)
- Treader (1999)
- Oddities (2000)
- Disappeared (2000)
- Masses (2001)
- Amassed (2002)
- The Sweetness of the Water (2004)
- Songs and Themes (2008)
- Hackney Road (2018) SHJ and Wadada Leo Smith with Pat Thomas and Steve Noble

Live albums

- Live (2003)
- Live in Antwerp (2014) with Pat Thomas, Alex Ward, Paul Lytton

EPs

- Bombscare (Tugboat, 2000) with Low

With Han Bennink

- Amplified Trio (Treader, 2007)
