= Three Day Moon =

Studio album by Barre Phillips
- Released: 1978
- Recorded: March 1978
- Studio: Talent Studio; Oslo, Norway
- Genre: Jazz
- Label: ECM 1124 ST
- Producer: Manfred Eicher

Barre Phillips chronology
Mountainscapes (1976)	Three Day Moon (1978)	Journal Violone II (1979)

Professional ratings
Review scores
Source	Rating
The Penguin Guide to Jazz Recordings	4/4 stars
The Rolling Stone Jazz Record Guide	3/5 stars

Three Day Moon is an album by American jazz bassist Barre Phillips recorded in March 1978 and released on ECM later that year. The quartet features guitarist Terje Rypdal, Dieter Feichtner on synthesizer and percussionist Trilok Gurtu.

== Track listing ==
All tracks are written by Barre Phillips.

Side I
No.	Title	Length
1.	"A-i-a"	9:41
2.	"Ms. P."	4:59
3.	"La folle"	5:18

Side II
No.	Title	Length
1.	"Brd"	8:38
2.	"Ingul-Buz"	3:58
3.	"S.C.&W."	9:27

== Personnel ==
- Barre Phillips – bass
- Terje Rypdal – guitar, guitar synthesizer
- Dieter Feichtner – synthesizer
- Trilok Gurtu – tabla, percussion
