= Call Me When You Get There =

Studio album by Barre Phillips
- Released: 1984
- Recorded: February, 1983
- Studio: Tonstudio Bauer; Ludwigsburg, West Germany
- Genre: Jazz
- Label: ECM; ECM 1257
- Producer: Manfred Eicher

Barre Phillips chronology
Music by... (1980)	Call Me When You Get There (1984)	Naxos (1990)

Call Me When You Get There is a solo album by bassist Barre Phillips recorded in February 1983 and released on ECM the following year.

== Reception ==
Professional ratings
Review scores
Source	Rating
AllMusic	4/5 stars
The Rolling Stone Jazz Record Guide	3/5 stars

AllMusic awarded the album 4 stars.

== Track listing ==
All compositions by Barre Phillips

1. "Grant's Pass" - 8:08
2. "Craggy Slope" - 4:57
3. "Amos Crown's Barn" - 4:00
4. "Pittman's Rock" - 4:59
5. "Highway 37" - 3:37
6. "Winslow Cavern" - 4:25
7. "Riverbend" - 4:13
8. "Brewstertown 2" - 5:28

== Personnel ==
- Barre Phillips – bass
