= Town Hall 1972 =

Live album by Anthony Braxton
- Released: 1972
- Recorded: May 22, 1972
- Venue: The Town Hall, New York City
- Genre: Jazz
- Length: 67:43
- Label: Trio
- Producer: Kuniya Inaoka, Takafumi Ohkuma

Anthony Braxton chronology
Saxophone Improvisations Series F (1972)	Town Hall 1972 (1972)	Four Compositions (1973) (1973)

Town Hall 1972 is a live album by American jazz saxophonist Anthony Braxton recorded in 1972 at The Town Hall in New York City and originally released on the Japanese Trio label and rereleased on the hatART label as Town Hall (Trio & Quintet) 1972 in 1992.

== Reception ==
The Allmusic review by Thom Jurek awarded the album 4 stars stating "The playing here is soulful and engaging throughout it features some crack improvisation".

Professional ratings
Review scores
Source	Rating
Allmusic	4/5 stars

== Track listing ==
All compositions by Anthony Braxton except where noted.

1. "Composition 6 N / Composition 6 (O)" – 18:18
2. "All The Things You Are" (Jerome Kern, Oscar Hammerstein II) – 14:12
3. "Composition 6 P I" – 13:46
4. "Composition 6 P II" – 21:25

== Personnel ==
- Anthony Braxton – soprano saxophone, alto saxophone, soprano clarinet, clarinet, contrabass clarinet, flute, percussion
- Dave Holland – bass
- Phillip Wilson – drums (tracks 1 & 2)
- John Stubblefield – tenor saxophone, flute, bass clarinet, gong, percussion (tracks 3 & 4)
- Jeanne Lee – vocals (tracks 3 & 4)
- Barry Altschul – percussion, marimba (tracks 3 & 4)
