= The Brass Project =

Studio album by John Surman / John Warren
- Released: 1993
- Recorded: April 1992
- Genre: Jazz
- Length: 72:51
- Label: ECM; ECM 1478
- Producer: Steve Lake

John Surman chronology
Adventure Playground (1991)	The Brass Project (1993)	Stranger than Fiction (1994)

CD Reissue Cover

The Brass Project is an album by English jazz saxophonist John Surman and Canadian conductor and composer John Warren, recorded in April 1992 and released on ECM the following year. Warren's brass nonet consists trumpeters Henry Lowther, Stephen Waterman, and Stuart Brooks, trombonists Malcolm Griffiths and Chris Pyne, bass trombonists David Stewart and Richard Edwards, and rhythm section Chris Laurence and John Marshall.

== Reception ==
The AllMusic review by Scott Yanow awarded the album 4½ stars, stating, "This episodic set has its share of sound explorations but also contains swinging sections and an impressive amount of excitement. The colorful solos (mostly by Surman) and the unpredictable writing make this a highly recommended disc."

Professional ratings
Review scores
Source	Rating
AllMusic	4.5/5 stars
The Penguin Guide to Jazz Recordings	3.5/4 stars

== Track listing ==
All compositions by John Warren except where noted.

1. "The Returning Exile" – 7:46
2. "Coastline" (Surman)– 3:38
3. "The New One Two Part 1" – 6:38
4. "The New One Two Part 2" – 7:33
5. "Spacial Motive" – 4:56
6. "Wider Vision" (Surman) – 8:33
7. "Silent Lake" – 6:01
8. "Mellstock Quire / Tantrum Clangley" – 11:19
9. "All for a Shadow" (Surman, Warren) 5:35

== Personnel ==
- John Surman – soprano saxophone, baritone saxophone, bass clarinet, alto clarinet, piano
- John Warren – conductor
  - Henry Lowther, Stephen Waterman, Stuart Brooks – trumpet
  - Malcolm Griffiths, Chris Pyne – trombone
  - David Stewart, Richard Edwards – bass trombone
  - Chris Laurence – bass
  - John Marshall – drums, percussion
