= Westering Home (album) =

Studio album by John Surman
- Released: 1972
- Genre: Jazz
- Length: 47:03
- Label: Island
- Producer: Peter Eden, John Surman, Robin Sylvester

John Surman chronology
By Contact (1971)	Westering Home (1972)	Morning Glory (1973)

Westering Home is the ninth album by English saxophonist John Surman recorded in 1972 and released on the Island label. This is the first album where he used the possibilities of overdubbing and composing on the fly.

== Reception ==
Professional ratings
Review scores
Source	Rating
Allmusic	4.5/5 stars
The Penguin Guide to Jazz Recordings	3/4 stars

Jason Ankeny awards this album in his allmusic review four and a half stars and classifies it as Surman´s most melodic and soulful recording. He further states, "The album is vividly experimental yet deeply intimate – while previous LPs like How Many Clouds Can You See? seemed fascinated with the reaches of sound, here Surman turns inward to explore the heart and mind. At the same time, his playing boasts its signature physical prowess, but with a new economy of scale – his solos are honed to a razor's edge, and not a single note is superfluous."

== Track listing ==
All compositions by John Surman.

=== Side one ===
1. "Mock Orange" – 4:31
2. "Whirligig" – 3:43
3. "Jynjyg" – 5:42
4. "The Druid" – 7:38
5. "Outside The Scorpion" – 2:46

=== Side two ===
1. "Walrus" – 4:00
2. "Hornpipe" – 5:52
3. "Watershed" – 6:05
4. "Rill-A-Ree" – 6:46

== Personnel ==
- John Surman – bass clarinet, euphonium, organ, percussion, piano, baritone sax, soprano sax, trumpet
- Robin Sylvester – engineering, recording, mixing
- Kenny Foster – photography
