= Barre Phillips =

American jazz bassist (1934–2024)

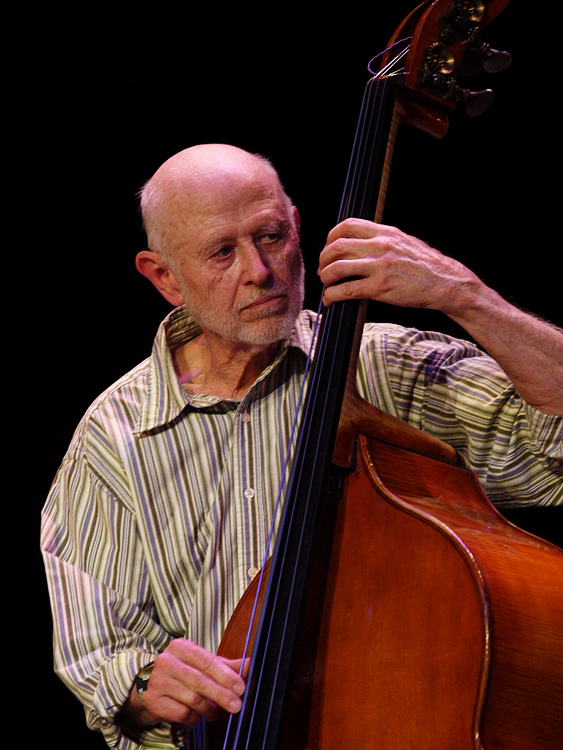
- Phillips in 2008

Background information
- Born: October 27, 1934; San Francisco, California, U.S.
- Died: December 28, 2024 (aged 90) Las Cruces, New Mexico, U.S.
- Genre: Jazz
- Occupation: Musician
- Instrument: Double bass
- Years active: 1960–2024
- Website: barrephillips.com

Barre Phillips (October 27, 1934 – December 28, 2024) was an American jazz bassist. A professional musician since 1960, he moved to New York City in 1962, then to Europe in 1967. From 1972 he was based in southern France, where in 2014 he founded the European Improvisation Center.

== Life and career ==
Phillips was born in San Francisco, California on October 27, 1934. He studied briefly in 1959 with S. Charles Siani, Assistant Principal Bassist with the San Francisco Symphony. During the 1960s, he recorded with (among others) Eric Dolphy, Jimmy Giuffre, Archie Shepp, Peter Nero, Attila Zoller, Lee Konitz, Marion Brown, Gong, Nino Ferrer, and Colette Magny.

Phillips' 1968 recording of solo bass improvisations, issued as Journal Violone in the US, Unaccompanied Barre in England, and Basse Barre in France on Futura Records, is generally credited as the first solo bass record. A 1971 record with Dave Holland, Music from Two Basses, was probably the first record of improvised double bass duets.

In the 1970s, he was a member of the well-regarded and influential group "The Trio", with saxophonist John Surman and drummer Stu Martin. In the 1980s and 1990s, he played regularly with the London Jazz Composers Orchestra, led by fellow bassist Barry Guy.

He had also worked with bassists Peter Kowald, William Parker, and Joëlle Léandre; guitarists Derek Bailey, Terje Rypdal, and Keiji Haino; clarinetists Theo Jörgensmann, Vinny Golia, and Aurélien Besnard; saxophonists Peter Brötzmann, Lol Coxhill, Evan Parker, John Butcher, Manu Dibango, and Joe Maneri; pianists Bob James, Paul Bley, Joachim Kühn, Mal Waldron, and Jacques Demierre; violinists Malcom Goldstein and Takehisa Kosugi; drummers Tony Buck and Limpe Fuchs; trumpetist Manfred Schoof; singer and guitarist Robin Williamson; singers Jeanne Lee, Jay Clayton, and Bobby McFerrin; trombonist Albert Mangelsdorff; and oud player Munir Bachir.

He was also responsible for the soundtracks of several films, including Robert Kramer's Route One/Usa (with Michel Petrucciani, Pierre Favre, and John Surman), Jacques Rivette's Merry-Go Round (with John Surman), and David Cronenberg's Naked Lunch (with Ornette Coleman).

Barre is the father of the rock guitarist Jay Crawford from the band Bomb; of the bassist Dave Phillips; and of singer Claudia Phillips, who was a one-hit wonder in France in 1987 with "Quel souci La Boétie".

Phillips died on December 28, 2024, at the age of 90.

== Discography ==
=== As leader ===
- Basse Barre (Futura, 1969)
- Alors (Futura, 1970)
- Music from Two Basses (ECM, 1971)
- For All It Is (JAPO, 1973) (recorded in 1971)
- Mountainscapes (ECM, 1976)
- Three Day Moon (ECM, 1978)
- Die Jungen: Random Generators (FMP, 1979)
- Journal Violone II (ECM, 1979)
- Music by... (ECM, 1980)
- Call Me When You Get There, (ECM, 1984)
- Camouflage (Victo, 1989)
- Naxos (CELP, 1990)
- Aquarian Rain (ECM, 1991)
- Etchings in the Air (PSF, 1996)
- No Pieces (Emouvance, 1996)
- Uzu (PSF, 1997)
- Jazzd'aià, (Bleu Regard, 1998)
- Play 'em as They Fall (Eyewill, 1999)
- Trignition (Nine Winds, 1999)
- Journal Violone 9 (Emouvance, 2001)
- October Base Trilouge (3D, 2001)
- After You've Gone (Victo, 2004)
- Angles of Repose (ECM, 2004)
- LDP (PSI, 2005)
- The Iron Stone (ECM, 2006)
- L' Improviste (CD Baby, 2008)
- While You Were Out (CD Baby/Kadima Collective, 2009)
- Everybody Else But Me (Foghorn, 2011)
- End to End (ECM, 2018)
- Face à Face (ECM, 2022)

=== As sideman ===
- Attila Zoller Quartet: The Horizon Beyond (1965)
- Archie Shepp Quartet: New Thing at Newport (1965)
- Bob James Trio: Explosions (1965)
- Gong: Magick Brother (1969)
- Chris McGregor Septet: Up to Earth, (Fledg'ling, 1969; 2008)
- Chris McGregor Trio: Our Prayer (Fledg'ling, 1969; 2008)
- The Trio: The Trio (Dawn, 1970)
- The Trio: Conflagration (Dawn, 1971)
- Terje Rypdal: What Comes After (ECM, 1973)
- Mumps: A Matter Of Taste (Albert Mangelsdorff, John Surman, Stu Martin) (MPS, 1977)
- Alfred Harth: This Earth! (ECM, 1983) with Paul Bley, Trilok Gurtu & Maggie Nicols
- Barry Guy and the London Jazz Composers' Orchestra: Zurich Concerts (Intakt, 1988)
- Barry Guy and the London Jazz Composers' Orchestra: Harmos (Intakt, 1989)
- Barry Guy and the London Jazz Composers' Orchestra: Double Trouble (Intakt, 1990)
- Barry Guy and the London Jazz Composers' Orchestra with Irène Schweizer: Theoria (Intakt, 1992)
- Time Will Tell with Paul Bley and Evan Parker (ECM, 1994)
- Joe Maneri: Tales of Rohnlief (ECM, 1998)
- The Space Between with Philip Gelb, Pauline Oliveros, and Dana Reason (482 Music, 2001)
- Barry Guy and the London Jazz Composers' Orchestra: Double Trouble Two (Intakt, 1998)
- Sankt Gerold with Paul Bley and Evan Parker (ECM, 2000)
- Musique Primale with Philippe Festou, ensemble contemporain Yin (sornettes, 2009)
- Barry Guy and the London Jazz Composers' Orchestra with Irène Schweizer: Radio Rondo/Schaffhausen Concert (Intakt, 2009)
- The Rock on the Hill with Lol Coxhill and JT Bates (nato, 2011)
- No Meat Inside (Facing You / IMR, 2013) quartet with François Cotinaud, Henri Roger, and Emmanuelle Somer
- The Trio: The Trio: Incantation, The Dawn Recordings 1970 - 1971 (Esoteric Recordings, 2018)
