= Donna Lee (album) =

Studio album by Anthony Braxton
- Released: 1972
- Recorded: February 18, 1972
- Genre: Jazz
- Length: 43:11
- Label: America
- Producer: Pierre Berjot; Bruno Guermonprez and Daniel Richard (Reissue)

Anthony Braxton chronology
| Together Alone (1971) | Donna Lee (1972) | Saxophone Improvisations Series F (1972) |

Donna Lee is an album by American saxophonist and composer Anthony Braxton recorded in 1972 and originally released on the French America label.

== Reception ==
The Allmusic review awarded the album 4 stars.

Professional ratings
Review scores
| Source | Rating |
|---|---|
| Allmusic | 4/5 stars |
| The Penguin Guide to Jazz Recordings | 3/4 stars |

== Track listing ==
All compositions by Anthony Braxton except where noted.

1. "Donna Lee" (Miles Davis) - 9:14
2. "H-204 3=HF G Composition No - 23L" - 12:03
3. "You Go to My Head Part 1" (J. Fred Coots, Haven Gillespie) - 6:21
4. "You Go to My Head Part 2" (Coots, Gillespie) - 10:18
5. "60666 C -66M Composition 23K" - 5:15
- Recorded at Studio Decca in Paris, France, on February 18, 1972

== Personnel ==
- Anthony Braxton – alto saxophone
- Michael Smith - piano
- Peter Warren - bass
- Oliver Johnson - drums
