= Meriç Yurdatapan =

Turkish jazz singer (born 1972)

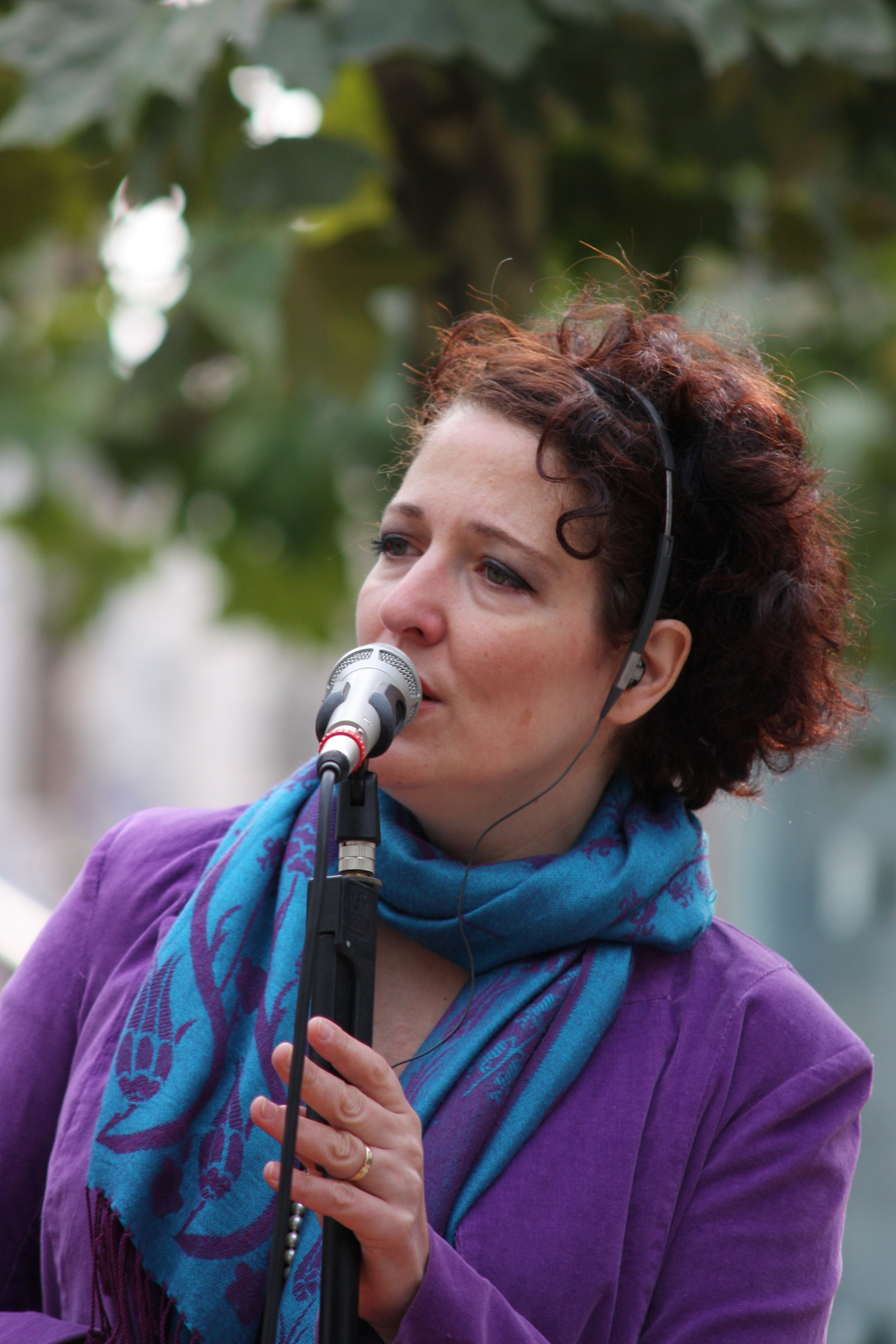
Meriç Yurdatapan (2013)

Meriç Yurdatapan (born 1972) is a Turkish woman jazz singer resident in Germany. Yurdatapan moved to Germany at 18 to study architecture, but switched to singing at the University of Mainz. She became well known in Germany following her concert Live in Mainz, which was her first commercial record release.

== Discography ==
- Meriç Yurdatapan Oriental Jazz Live in Mainz 2007
- Meriç Yurdatapan The Great Turkish Songbook
