= Saxophone Improvisations Series F =

Studio album by Anthony Braxton
- Released: 1972
- Recorded: February 25, 1972
- Studio: Studio Decca in Paris, France
- Genre: Jazz
- Length: 80:09
- Label: America
- Producer: Pierre Berjot; Bruno Guermonprez and Daniel Richard (Reissue)

Anthony Braxton chronology
Donna Lee (1972)	Saxophone Improvisations Series F (1972)	Town Hall 1972 (1972)

Saxophone Improvisations Series F is a solo album by American saxophonist and composer Anthony Braxton, recorded in 1972 and originally released on the French America label.

== Reception ==
The AllMusic review by Eugene Chadbourne stated that "although the early recordings of Braxton seem to be marked by frustration and failure, this is a suitable follow-up to For Alto as well as an improvement, a great accomplishment in itself".

Professional ratings
Review scores
Source	Rating
AllMusic	4/5 stars
The Penguin Guide to Jazz Recordings	3.5/4 stars
The Rolling Stone Jazz Record Guide	4/5 stars

== Track listing ==
All compositions by Anthony Braxton.

Disc one

1. "BWC-12 N-48" - 5:00
2. "Nr-12-C (33M)" - 9:09
3. "Rfo-M° F (32)" - 6:54
4. "JMK-80 CFN-7" - 17:57

Disc two

1. "178-F4 312" - 2:20
2. "NBH-7C K7" - 5:26
3. "MMKF-6 (CN-72)" - 6:59
4. "(348-R) C-233" - 7:23
5. "104°-Kelvin M-12" - 19:01

== Personnel ==
- Anthony Braxton – alto saxophone
