= John Warren (musician) =

Canadian jazz musician and composer (born 1938)

- Born: September 23, 1938 (age 87); Montreal, Quebec, Canada
- Genres: Jazz
- Occupations: Musician, composer, jazz musician
- Instrument: Baritone saxophone

John Warren (born September 23, 1938) is a composer and musician known for his contributions to the jazz genre.

== Career ==
Warren studied saxophone and flute during his university years, and his initial forays into composition were encouraged by the celebrated Canadian trumpet player, Herbie Spanier, leading to early performances of his work on CBC radio and TV.

In 1962, Warren relocated to England, where he made connections with notable musicians like Kenny Wheeler, Art Ellefson, and John Surman.

By 1968, Warren had formed his own big band, featuring talents like Surman, John Taylor, Wheeler, and Alan Skidmore. The band gained recognition through performances on the BBC Jazz Club and Jazz in Britain programmes, alongside appearances at various London clubs.

The 1970s marked a productive period for Warren, with the recording of his suite Tales of the Algonquin and compositions for the John Surman Octet, the Alan Skidmore Quintet, and vocalists Norma Winstone and Karin Krog. He also received commissions from ensembles like the Kurt Edelhagen Big Band and the Danish Radio Big Band. The John Warren Band continued with tours in Germany, Switzerland, and the UK throughout the mid-70s.

The 1980s saw Warren collaborating with John Surman on The Brass Project, an ensemble featuring a brass choir and Surman’s trio. The Brass Project toured extensively and recorded for ECM Records in 1992. During this decade, Warren also delved into arranging Chet Baker's solos with lyrics by Georgie Fame for performances with the NDR Big Band.

In the 1990s, Warren took on the role of director for the Voice of the North Jazz Orchestra, showcasing musicians from the North East of England. The turn of the millennium brought a commission for a suite featuring Surman, resulting in the suite Chain Reaction, premiered at the Hull Jazz Festival and subsequently performed in Italy.

Warren's career continued into the 2000s with the recording of two CDs, Finally Beginning and Following On, featuring prominent British jazz musicians. He also revisited his earlier work, performing Tales of the Algonquin with the Bohuslän Big Band and presenting the suite with the AltSys Jazz Orchestra in Montreal.

In 2019, Warren's composition The Traveller's Tale was performed by John Surman and The Brass Project at the EFG London Jazz Festival, followed by the release of a live recording of the piece.

Throughout his career, Warren has shared his knowledge and passion for music through workshops and performances at prestigious institutions like the Guildhall School of Music and Drama, the Royal Academy of Music, the Royal Northern College of Music, and the Royal Birmingham Conservatoire. He also served as a lecturer in Harmony and Composition at Newcastle College for eight years.

== Discography ==
- Tales of the Algonquin (Deram, 1971), with John Surman
- John Warren Bigband - Live (Sparkasse Bremen, 1976)
- The Brass Project (ECM Records, 1993), with John Surman
- Finally Beginning (Fuzzy Moon Records, 2008)
- Following On (Fuzzy Moon Records, 2009)
- The Traveller's Tale (Fledg'ling Records, 2017)
