= John Surman =

English jazz musician and composer (born 1944)

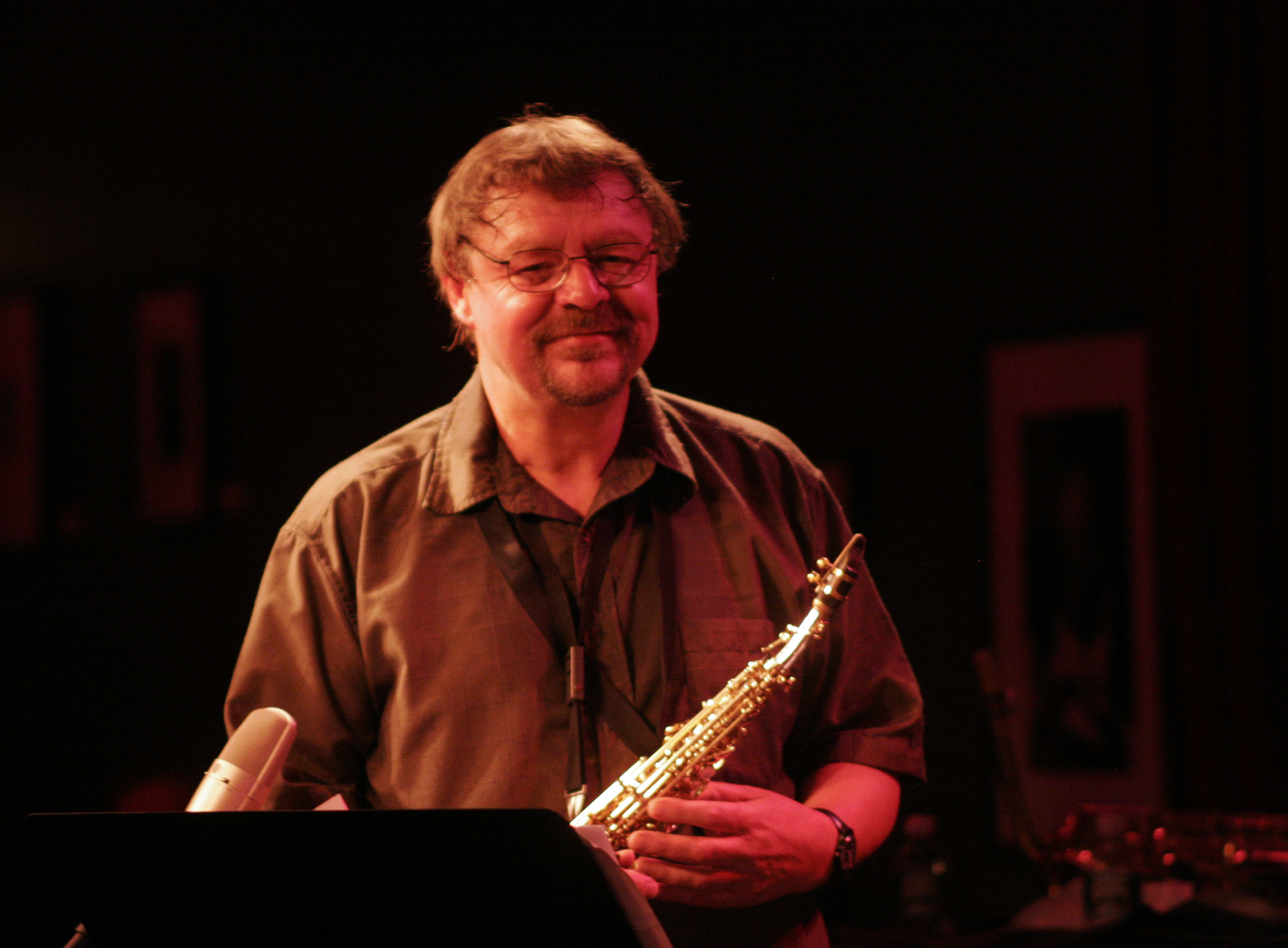
- Surman performing in Birdland, 2 September 2009

Background information
- Born: John Douglas Surman; 30 August 1944 (age 82); Tavistock, Devon, England
- Genres: Jazz, avant-garde, free jazz, modal jazz
- Occupations: Musician, composer, arranger
- Instruments: Baritone saxophone, soprano saxophone, bass clarinet, synthesizer
- Years active: 1960s–present
- Labels: Deram, Dawn, ECM
- Website: www.johnsurman.com

John Douglas Surman (born 30 August 1944) is an English jazz saxophone, clarinet, and synthesizer player, and composer of free jazz and modal jazz, often using themes from folk music. He has composed and performed music for dance performances and film soundtracks.

== Life and career ==
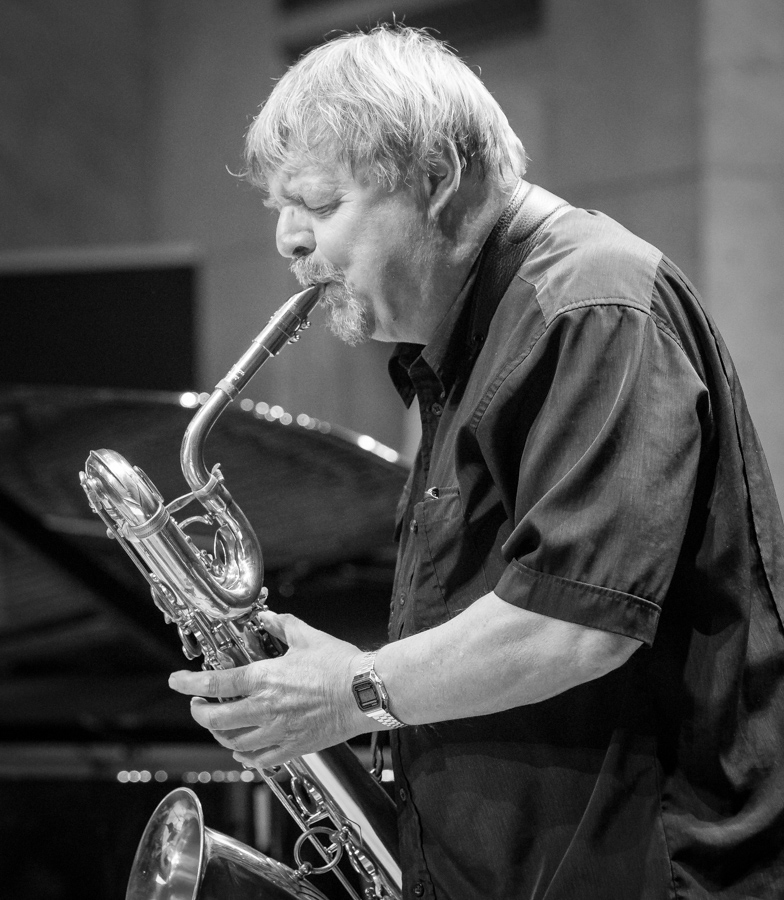
John Surman at the 2017 Oslo Jazz Festival

Surman was born in Tavistock, Devon, England. He initially gained recognition playing baritone saxophone in the Mike Westbrook Band in the mid-1960s, and was soon heard regularly playing soprano saxophone and bass clarinet as well. His first playing issued on a record was with the Peter Lemer Quintet in 1966. After further recordings and performances with jazz bandleaders Mike Westbrook and Graham Collier and blues-rock musician Alexis Korner, he made the first record under his own name in 1968.

In 1969, he founded The Trio along with two expatriate American musicians, bassist Barre Phillips and drummer Stu Martin. In the mid-1970s, he founded one of the earliest all-saxophone jazz groups, S.O.S., along with alto saxophonist Mike Osborne and tenor saxophonist Alan Skidmore. During this early period, he also recorded with (among others) saxophonist Ronnie Scott, guitarist John McLaughlin, bandleader Michael Gibbs, trombonist Albert Mangelsdorff, and pianist Chris McGregor's Brotherhood of Breath.

By 1972, he had begun experimenting with synthesizers. That year he recorded Westering Home, the first of several solo projects on which he played all parts himself via overdubbing. He recorded his final album with Mike Westbrook, Citadel/Room 315, in 1975.

Many of the musical relationships he established during the 1970s continued for decades. These include a quartet with pianist John Taylor, bassist Chris Laurence, and drummer John Marshall; duets and other projects with Norwegian singer Karin Krog (Surman's long-term partner); and duets and other projects with American drummer/pianist Jack DeJohnette.

His relationship with ECM Records has also been continuous from the late 1970s to the present, as Surman has recorded prolifically for the label playing bass clarinet, recorders, soprano and baritone saxophones and using synthesisers, both solo and with a wide range of other musicians.

Surman was featured in a profile on composer Graham Collier in the 1985 Channel 4 documentary, Hoarded Dreams.

Since the 1990s, he has composed several suites of music that feature his playing in unusual contexts, including with church organ and chorus (Proverbs and Songs, 1996); with a classical string quintet (Coruscating); and with the London Brass and Jack DeJohnette (Free and Equal, 2001). He has also played in a unique trio with Tunisian oud-player Anouar Brahem and bassist Dave Holland (Thimar, 1997); has performed the songs of John Dowland with singer John Potter formerly of the Hilliard Ensemble; and made contributions to the drum and bass album Disappeared by Spring Heel Jack.

Other musicians he has worked with include bassist Miroslav Vitouš, bandleader Gil Evans, pianist Paul Bley and Vigleik Storaas, saxophonist (and composer) John Warren, guitarists Terje Rypdal and John Abercrombie and trumpeter Tomasz Stańko.

His latest musical endeavour is Words Unspoken, which was released on ECM Records in February 2024 to universal critical acclaim, receiving a glowing five-star write-up in BBC Music Magazine and widespread radio play across Europe and North America. This bassless quartet features Thomas Strønen on drums as well as the British Rob Luft on guitar and electronics.

== Awards and honors ==
- 1999: Spellemannprisen in the category Jazz, with Karin Krog for the album Bluesand
- 2013: Spellemannprisen in the category Jazz, with Karin Krog for the album Songs About This and That

== Discography ==
=== As leader ===
- John Surman (Deram, 1969)
- How Many Clouds Can You See? (Deram, 1970)
- The Trio with Barre Phillips, Stu Martin (Dawn, 1970)
- Conflagration (The Trio) with Barre Phillips, Stu Martin and others (Dawn, 1971)
- Tales of the Algonquin with John Warren (Deram, 1971)
- Where Fortune Smiles with John McLaughlin, Dave Holland, Stu Martin, Karl Berger (Dawn, 1971)
- Westering Home (Island, 1972)
- Jazz in Britain '68-'69 with Alan Skidmore, Tony Oxley (Decca Eclipse, 1972)
- Morning Glory with John Marshall, Terje Rypdal, Chris Laurence, John Taylor, Malcolm Griffiths (Island, 1973)
- John Surman (Jazz Vogue, 1974)
- Live at Moers Festival with Tony Levin (Ring, 1975)
- Live at Woodstock Town Hall (Dawn, 1975)
- Sonatinas with Stan Tracey (Steam, 1978)
- Upon Reflection (ECM, 1979)
- Cloud Line Blue with Karin Krog (Polydor, 1979)
- The Amazing Adventures of Simon Simon (ECM, 1981)
- Such Winters of Memory (ECM, 1983)
- Withholding Pattern (ECM, 1985)
- By Contact (The Trio) with Barre Phillips, Stu Martin (Ogun, 1987) (reissue)
- Private City (ECM, 1988)
- Road to Saint Ives (ECM, 1990)
- Adventure Playground (ECM, 1992)
- The Brass Project with John Warren (ECM, 1993)
- Stranger than Fiction (ECM, 1994)
- Nordic Quartet with Karin Krog, Terje Rypdal and Vigleik Storaas (ECM, 1995)
- A Biography of the Rev. Absalom Dawe (ECM, 1995)
- Proverbs and Songs (ECM, 1997)
- Bluesand with Karin Krog (Meantime, 1999)
- Coruscating (ECM, 2000)
- Invisible Nature with Jack DeJohnette (ECM, 2002)
- Free and Equal (ECM, 2003)
- Way Back When (Cuneiform, 2005)
- The Spaces in Between (ECM, 2007)
- Rain on the Window with Howard Moody (ECM, 2008)
- Brewster's Rooster (ECM, 2009)
- Flashpoint: NDR Jazz Workshop (Cuneiform, 2011)
- Saltash Bells (ECM, 2012)
- Songs About This and That with Karin Krog (Meantime, 2013)
- Another Sky with Bergen Big Band (Grappa, 2014)
- Infinite Paths with Karin Krog (Meantime, 2016)
- Invisible Threads (ECM, 2018)
- Words Unspoken (ECM, 2024 with Rob Luft, Thomas Strønen & Rob Waring)

=== As sideman ===
With Paul Bley

- 1986 Fragments (ECM)
- 1988 The Paul Bley Quartet (ECM)
- 1993 In the Evenings Out There (ECM)

With Graham Collier

- 2005 Workpoints (Cuneiform)
- 2007 Hoarded Dreams (Cuneiform)

With Christine Collister

- 1998 The Dark Gift of Time (Fledg'ling)
- 2000 Songbird
- 2001 An Equal Love

With Michael Gibbs

- 1970 Michael Gibbs (Deram)
- 1971 Tanglewood 63 (Deram)
- 2018 Festival 69 (Turtle)

With Per Husby

- 1987 Your Eyes
- 1990 Dedications (Hot Club)

With Alexis Korner

- 1970 Both Sides
- 1979 The Party Album
- 1981 Alexis Korner and Friends

With Karin Krog

- 1986 Freestyle (Odin)
- 2002 Raindrops, Raindrops
- 2010 Folkways (Meantime)

With Chris McGregor

- 1970 Chris McGregor's Brotherhood of Breath (RCA/Neon, 1971)
- 2008 Up to Earth (Fledg'ling)

With John McLaughlin

- 1969 Extrapolation
- 1971 Where Fortune Smiles

With Mike Osborne and Alan Skidmore

- 1972 Shapes
- 1974 Looking for the Next One
- 1975 SOS (Ogun)

With Barre Phillips

- 1976 Mountainscapes (ECM)
- 1980 Journal Violone II (ECM)
- 1980 Music by... (ECM)

With John Potter

- 1999 In Darkness Let Me Dwell (ECM)
- 2003 Care-Charming Sleep (ECM)
- 2008 Romaria
- 2013 Night Sessions

With Colin Towns

- 1993 Mask Orchestra (The Jazz Label)
- 1997 Bolt from the Blue (Provocateur)

With Miroslav Vitous

- 1980 First Meeting (ECM)
- 1981 Miroslav Vitous Group (ECM)
- 1983 Journey's End (ECM)

With Mike Westbrook

- 1967 Celebration (Deram)
- 1968 Release (Deram)
- 1969 Marching Song Vol. 1 (Deram)
- 1969 Marching Song Vol. 2 (Deram)
- 1975 Citadel/Room 315 (RCA)
- 2018 The Night at the Old Place (Cadillac)

With others

- 1968 Local Colour, Peter Lemer (ESP Disk)
- 1968 Ronnie Scott And The Band – Live At Ronnie Scott's, Ronnie Scott (CBS)
- 1969 Gittin' to Know Y'All, Lester Bowie
- 1970 Flare Up, Harry Beckett (Philips)
- 1971 Going to the Rainbow, Rolf Kuhn (BASF)
- 1971 Duke Ellington Classics, Humphrey Lyttelton (Black Lion)
- 1972 Bass Is, Peter Warren (Enja)
- 1977 A Matter Of Taste, Mumps (Albert Mangelsdorff, Barre Phillips, Stu Martin) (MPS)
- 1979 In Pas(s)ing, Mick Goodrick (ECM)
- 1983 Irina, Barry Altschul (Soul Note)
- 1988 Meets the Francy Boland Kenny Clark Big Band, Gitte Haenning
- 1992 Ambleside Days, John Taylor (Ah Um)
- 1993 November, John Abercrombie (ECM)
- 1993 Room 1220, Albert Mangelsdorff (Konnex)
- 1998 Thimar, Anouar Brahem (ECM)
- 1998 From the Green Hill, Tomasz Stańko (ECM)
- 1999 First Impression, Misha Alperin (ECM)
- 2000 Disappeared, Spring Heel Jack
- 2000 John Williams' Baritone Band
- 2003 Le Cinema de Bertrand Tavernier, Philippe Sarde
- 2005 Hybrids, Jack DeJohnette's The Ripple Effect (Golden Beams)
- 2009 The Believers, J. Peter Robinson
- 2011 Nino Rota, Richard Galliano (Deutsche Grammophon)

Awards
Preceded by Espen Rud Sextett	Recipient of the Jazz Spellemannprisen; 1999	Succeeded by Petter Wettre and Per Oddvar Johansen
Preceded by Sidsel Endresen and Stian Westerhus	Recipient of the Jazz Spellemannprisen; 2013	Succeeded by Marius Neset and Trondheim Jazz Orchestra
