= Bracknell Jazz Festival =

UK music festival

- Genre: Jazz
- Dates: First weekend of July (3 days)
- Locations: Bracknell, England
- Years active: 1975–early 1990s

The Bracknell Jazz Festival was a major showcase for British modern jazz in the 1980s. The festival was known for attracting a largish audience for free improvisation, modern jazz composition and all kinds of British modern jazz in general.

However, over the years Bracknell featured a wide range of performers from old-fashioned rhythm and blues musicians such as Alexis Korner or Jack Bruce, fusion stars such as Allan Holdsworth or Barbara Thompson, British modern jazz performers of all shapes and ages and a strong line-up of visiting stars such as Ornette Coleman, Stanley Clarke, Don Cherry, Pharoah Sanders, George Coleman and many more.

In the words of festival organiser John Cumming – "The keynote of the Festival is to provide the jazz scene – listeners and musicians alike – with a weekend of the best in British jazz, spiced with visiting Americans, in an informal, relaxed atmosphere.". Cumming, director of Serious Productions went on to organise Camden Jazz with Charles Alexander and Peter Luxton from the Jazz Centre Society, and the London Jazz Festival.

== Overview ==
The festival was held from 1975 onwards in the grounds and the house of South Hill Park, a Victorian manor house converted into an arts centre in the Berkshire town of Bracknell, a typical Thames Valley new town. As well as the jazz festival, the centre is a venue for performances and education in jazz, other kinds of music and other art forms throughout the year.

Most of the performances were held in large marquees on the lawn, while some events including workshops for musicians were held in rooms in the house. The beer tent was run by the local branch of CAMRA (the campaign for real ale) offering strong ales from many parts of southern England. Journalist Steve Lake wrote in 1976, "Up against the madness of American and Continental jazz festivals Bracknell had seemed, initially, a tranquil, even sedate affair. Musicians and their families picknicked outside the main marquee, cocking lazy ears to the sound of Ralph Towner's delicate twelve-string arpeggios. It was all very pleasant."

From 1988, many elements of the festival survived as the Outside In festival held in Crawley West Sussex.

South Hill Park seen from the garden, February 2006

Mainstays of the Bracknell festival included the perennial compere and soprano saxophonist Lol Coxhill; free improvisers such as drummer John Stevens, trombonist Paul Rutherford, drummer Tony Oxley and saxophonist Evan Parker; many musicians in and around the Mike Westbrook orchestra, such as John Surman; South Africans such as Dudu Pukwana and Johnny Dyani; drummer Roger Turner, sax player Elton Dean, and other members of the so-called Canterbury scene; pianist Django Bates and other bastions of the British modern jazz scene. The festival was always opened by local talent, the Berkshire Youth Jazz Orchestra.

The festival often featured a work especially commissioned for the event by the Arts Council of Great Britain, these included: Stan Tracey's Bracknell Connection in 1976, Mike Westbrook's The Cortege in 1979, and Graham Collier's Hoarded Dreams in 1983.

== 1970s ==
=== 1976 ===
The Arts Council Commission was The Bracknell Connection a piece by the Stan Tracey Octet, featuring Peter King (alto), Art Themen (tenor), Don Weller (tenor), Harry Beckett (trumpet), Malcolm Griffiths trombone), all British jazz performers who would revisit the festival many times over the years. The piece was later recorded at the 100 Club in London and released on Steam Records. Other acts included guitarist Ralph Towner and a duet between Stan Tracey and Mike Osborne, which was released as the Tandem to good reviews.

=== 1977 ===
Elton Dean's Ninesense, a nonet featuring Dean, Alan Skidmore, Harry Beckett, Marc Charig, Nick Evans, Radu Malfatti, Keith Tippett, Harry Miller and Louis Moholo, performing the Arts Council commission, a suite later recorded in a studio and released as Happy Daze on Ogun Records. A popular act, Ninesense were to return the following year and Elton Dean again in 1980 (with a quintet). And famously 1977 saw Bracknell's beloved compere Lol Coxhill performing his legendary monologue "Murder in the Air", following which he was asked to record it as a 12" single Chiltern Sound records.

=== 1978 ===
The headline act was Ornette Coleman. Other acts included the trio of British free improvisers John Stevens, Trevor Watts and Barry Guy, who returned the following year with pianist Howard Riley. Also appearing was the Pat Metheny Group – Metheny/Mays/Gottlieb/Egan – a few months after its debut UK performance. A sign of things to come; the record stalls sold out of the quartet's eponymous ECM album before the set was over. And Saxophonist David Murray played an unforgettable long solo-concert.

=== 1979 ===
The headline act on the Friday night was Rocket 88 a boogie-woogie big band including Rolling Stones drummer Charlie Watts and Ian Stewart the "6th Stone" on piano along with bassist Jack Bruce, Alexis Korner and an array of British horn-players.

Also appearing were the Jan Garbarek Group with Bill Connors, Jon Christensen, Eberhard Weber & John Taylor. The Arts Council commission that year was The Cortege by the Mike Westbrook Orchestra, described as "a composition for Voices and 16-piece Jazz Orchestra including settings of poetry, arranged by Kate Westbrook, by Lorca, Rimbaud, Hesse, John Clare and other European poets, sung in the original languages by Kate Westbrook and Phil Minton". The piece was later recorded as a triple album. Other acts in 1979 included the Ed Bickert Trio and guitarist Mike Stern.

== 1980s ==
John Stevens was back again in 1980 with European free improvisers Marc Charig, Paul Rutherford, Peter Brötzmann, Barry Guy and Peter Kowald. Other acts included two electric guitarists – Jeff Clyne's's jazz-rock group "Turning Point" and the young Pat Metheny. The British group Spirit Level led by sax player Paul Dunmall, who were also to return in 1981.

=== 1981 ===
Drummer Max Roach played a short set, much of it a drum solo, (there are bootleg recordings available). The Ray d'Inverno trio performed a tribute to Bill Evans. Canadian electric jazz band Uzeb did their first show abroad which was recorded as Live in Bracknell and then digitally re-mastered and re-issued in 2006 to celebrate the band's 25th anniversary.

=== 1982 ===
The headline act was the reunion of legendary John Coltrane Quartet members Elvin Jones and McCoy Tyner.

John Stevens' album Freebop was recorded at the festival the band including Evan Parker, and received a five-star review from Down Beat magazine. This year saw a duet between Abdullah Ibrahim and Carlos Ward that has been described as "delicate, poignant, austere ...conjuring a resonance from the simplest tune". Trumpeter Lester Bowie, from the "Chicago Art Ensemble", appeared with his group, "From The Roots to the Source", which featured vocalists Fontella Bass, David Peaston, pianist Art Matthews, tenor saxophonist Ari Brown, and drummer Phillip Wilson.

=== 1983 ===
The Arts Council commission was Hoarded Dreams, a big band led by bass player Graham Collier and including musicians such as Kenny Wheeler, Tomasz Stanko, John Surman, Ted Curson, Henry Lowther, Manfred Schoof, and Malcolm Griffiths. The piece was recorded at the festival and released on Cuneiform Records. An extended documentary and profile of Collier, based around the Bracknell Jazz Hoarded Dreams concert in 1983, was broadcast by Channel 4 on March 6 1985 Another live recording made that year was the highly praised Gheim by the Paul Rutherford Trio. The headline act was the Bobby Hutcherson Quartet featuring Tete Montoliu and Billy Higgins, which was broadcast on BBC radio.

=== 1984 ===
Stan Tracey was back again with a quartet including his son Clark Tracey and saxophonist Art Themen performing his Poet's Suite. And Elton Dean was back again with a quintet. The Festival Commission that year was a piece by Trevor Watts 14-piece Moire Music. Other acts that year included the European Jazz Ensemble featuring Tony Oxley, Alan Skidmore, Gerd Dudek and others; Factory Records' jazz-dance act Kalima; and British fusion group Full Circle. Jazz tubist John Bodwin returned to play a short solo set.

=== 1985 ===
Acts included Terry Day's Kahondo Style.

=== 1986 ===
The headline act was trumpeter Don Cherry, this time his set, with his group "Nu" including Mark Helias, Carlos Ward and Nana Vasconcelos was recorded and later released on BBC records. Other acts included guitarist Billy Jenkins, who would return the following year.

=== 1987 ===
Acts included: In Cahoots featuring Canterbury music legends Phil Miller, Hugh Hopper, Pip Pyle and Elton Dean; The Michael Gibbs Orchestra including trumpeter Ian Carr; and John Bodwin, in what was one of his last public performances. Headliners were The George Russell Orchestra.

== Live recordings from the festival ==
- Tandem Mike Osborne/Stan Tracey – Live at the Bracknell Festival Ogun Records – 1976
- the 1979 set by Barbara Thompson’s Paraphernalia was recorded for TV
- parts of Voila Enough! by Steve Beresford, Peter Cusack, David Toop and Terry Day from 1979.
- Debut album by Canadian jazz-fusion group Uzeb – Live in Bracknell 1981 – their first concert in Europe
- John Stevens – Freebop (Affinity (1982)
  - and Freebop's 1986 performance was released as the album Live Tracks on Impetus Records, this group included Evan Parker and Courtney Pine.
- Bassist and composer Graham Collier's Hoarded Dreams (1983) (Arts Council commission, featuring Ted Curson and Manfred Schoof). Described by Jazzwise as a masterpiece.
- Paul Rutherford Trio – Gheim – Live at Bracknell 1983 – w Paul Rogers (bass) and Nigel Morris (drums) – CD includes the entire festival set, one of Rutherford's most acclaimed works.
- Dudu Pukwana and Zila – Life in Bracknell & Willisau – 1983 – including Django Bates on piano.
- Eddie Prevost Quartet's Continuum = 1983 reviewed as "one of the few 'must haves' of British free jazz" and "sounds like bebop heard at a distance or in a dream" (Alan Durant
- The 1984 performance by the Lennie Best Quintet was recorded for television
- Unofficial recordings are available of the 1984 performance by Don Cherry and The Leaders including Arthur Blythe, Chico Freeman, Hilton Ruiz, Cecil McBee and Famadou Don Moye.
- Cherry's 1986 show with "Nu" including Carlos Ward, Nana Vasconcelos, and Ed Blackwell was released on CD by the BBC in 2002 after years of bickering over the rights.
