= The Third Colour =

Studio album by Graham Collier
- Released: 1999
- Recorded: November 1997
- Venue: Oris London Jazz festival
- Genre: Jazz
- Length: 97:38
- Label: ASC Records; ASC CD28
- Producer: Graham Collier

Graham Collier chronology
Adam's Marble (1995)	The Third Colour (1999)	Winter Oranges (2000)

The Third Colour is an album recorded in November 1997 as part of the 60th birthday celebration for Graham Collier, featuring his four new compositions. "Three Simple Pieces" are 'what the name implies, composed for his 60th birthday (performed originally in February 1997 at the Royal Academy of Music). The suite "Shapes, Colours, Energy" is formed by five moments, composed in July 1995, and was inspired by the Canadian Rockies. The suite "Mirò Tile" refers to Collier's memories of Spain in 1996. The last suite, which names the album, "The Third Colour", was specifically composed for the London Jazz Festival.

== Reception ==
Valonkuvia wrote "All the compositions in the album are based on the peaceful development of themes, the constant dialogue between the orchestra and the soloists, and sometimes even the use of free jazz. There is plenty of room for solos in the compositions, but on the other hand, soloists are rarely free to solo alone without any other orchestra. After hearing the composition, the listener feels that they have wandered with the band on a journey that leads from a quiet beginning through swinging stages to a happy ending. The arc of the journey is built logically, but a little unexpectedly. Despite the slightly chilly recording, “The Third Color” is an interesting record, although it offers nothing previously unheard of if you are familiar with the work of other large European orchestras."

== Release ==
This work was firstly published by ASC Records (JazzContinuum) in 1999, followed by the JazzPrint reprint in 2003 with a different cover.

== Track listing ==
All compositions by Graham Collier.

1. "Three Simple Pieces" - 19:37
2. "Shapes, Colours, Energy" - 26:16
3. "The Mirò Tile" - 23:50
4. "The Third Colour" - 27:55

== Personnel ==
- Steve Waterman, trumpet, track 1
- Ed Speight, guitar, track 1,2,3,4
- Art Themen, saxophone, track 1, 4
- John Marshall, drums, track 1, 2, 3
- Hugh Fraser, trombone, track 2, 4
- Steve Main, saxophone, track 2, 4
- Matt Colman, trombone, track 2
- Roger Dean, keyboards, track 2, 3, 4
- Geoff Warren, saxophone, track 2, 3
- Oren Marshall, tuba, track 2, 4
- Ed Sarath, piano, track 3, 4
- Karlheinz Miklin, saxophone, track 3, 4
- Andy Cleyndert, bass, track 4
- Graham Collier, conductor
