= Charles River Fragments =

Studio album by Graham Collier
- Released: 1996
- Recorded: May 1994 and 1995
- Venue: London Jazz Festival
- Studio: BBC Radio Three Studios
- Genre: Jazz
- Length: 65:47
- Label: Boathouse Records BHR 004; JazzPrint JPVP 123
- Producer: Graham Collier and Hugh Fraser

Graham Collier chronology
Something British Made in Hong Kong (1985)	Charles River Fragments (1996)	Adam's Marble (1995)

Charles River Fragments is an album by Graham Collier, composed of two pieces, which are "The Hackney Five" (9:51), a suite recorded in 1995 and dedicated to Cleo and Ian Palmer and to Zoe, Lucy and Rupert, and the proper "Charles River Fragments" (totalling 55:56), a suite composed by 10 sections, commissioned by BBC Radio Three for the London Jazz Festival and recorded in May 1994.

== Releases ==
The album was firstly published by the English label Boathouse Records in 1996 (code BHR 004), and successively in 2003 by the JazzPrint label, which is the current release. The two issues present different covers.

== Reception ==
AllAboutJazz reports an excerpt of the book "Mosaic" by Duncan Heining: "...There are the inevitable cadenzas, changes of tempo and mood, fluctuations in volume and abrupt endings. Ballads contrast with a fast waltz or with driving jazz-rock or swinging big band jazz, at times with a strong Latin feel. And, perhaps more successfully here than on any of Collier's previous compositions, we hear the deployment of discrete improvising units".

== Track listing ==
All compositions by Graham Collier.

1. "The Hackney Five" - 9:51
2. "Main Melody, Fragments 1-4 repeated, Part 4" - 7:48
3. "Fragments 5 to 7, Guitar Cadenza and Part 7" - 6:19
4. "Fragments 8 to 1 into Part One" - 3:54
5. "Fragments 2 to 8 into Part 8" - 6:34
6. "Fragments 9 to 3 into Part 3" - 4:29
7. "Fragments 4 and 5 into Part 5" - 4:40
8. "Fragments 6 to 9 into Part 9" - 5:58
9. "Fragments 10 to 2 into Part 2" - 5:43
10. "Fragments 3 to 6 into Part 6" - 6:04
11. "Fragments 7 to 10 into Part 10 and Main Melody" - 4:22

== Personnel ==
The Jazz Ensemble:

- Hugh Fraser - trombone
- Steve Waterman - trumpet
- Henry Lowther - trumpet
- Art Themen - tenor sax, soprano sax
- Mark Lockheart - tenor sax, soprano sax
- Chris Biscoe - baritone sax, alto clarinet
- Geoff Warren - alto sax, alto flute
