= Roger Dean (musician) =

Roger Thornton Dean (born 6 September 1948, Manchester UK) is a British-Australian musician, academic, biochemist and cognitive scientist. He is married to poet, writer, musician and academic Hazel Smith (writer) , and was educated in the UK at the Crypt School, Gloucester, and Corpus Christi College, Cambridge. Formerly, he was the foundation Director of the Heart Research Institute, Sydney (1988–2002), and then the Vice-Chancellor and President of the University of Canberra (2002–2007). From 2007 onwards he is a research professor of sonic communication at the MARCS Institute, Western Sydney University, and leads the creative music ensemble austraLYSIS.

== Music ==
Dean is a composer, improviser (piano, computers) and performer. He studied the piano, and double bass with Eugene Cruft and was principal bass in the National Youth Orchestra of Great Britain. As bassist, he performed solo at Wigmore Hall in London at age 15. Dean has worked with ensembles including the BBC Symphony Orchestra, the Berliner Band, London Sinfonietta, Music Projects/London, Spectrum and many other contemporary music and improvising ensembles in London prior to his departure to Australia in 1988. In Australia, Dean has played with the Australian Chamber Orchestra and the Sydney Alpha Ensemble. He has premiered and recorded works for solo double bass and many have been written for him.

As keyboardist, Dean has been accompanist for trumpeter John Wallace and violinist Hazel Smith, and performed around the world in Smith's ensemble Sonant. He has also accompanied and performed with Marion Montgomery (vocalist) and Sue Tomes (piano) and her former ensemble Domus. As jazz keyboards player, Dean worked extensively with Graham Collier Music, a leading European jazz group. He was featured in a profile on Collier in the 1985 Channel 4 documentary 'Hoarded Dreams', and is quoted frequently in his biography.

In Australia, Dean has played keyboards with the Sydney Alpha Ensemble, Watt, and the British tenor Gerald English. He has been active within the What is Music? festivals, playing piano and computers. He has also played vibraphone with Collier, and recorded on the instrument on the album Lysis Plus.

Dean formed the British group LYSIS in 1970, and it became austraLYSIS in 1990 in Australia. LYSIS always presented both improvised and composed music, and operated within jazz and free improvisation as well as contemporary classical music circles. LYSIS and austraLYSIS have continuously evolved, including presenting multimedia and electronic work. Currently austraLYSIS is primarily a creative ensemble which also presents electroacoustic work of others .

Dean's music has been presented live and broadcast around the world. His largest commission to date, SonoPetal, was from the Australian Chamber Orchestra; his Niche Turbulence (2021-2025), for an orchestra of immprovisers, was commissioned and premiered by the Monash Art Ensemble. He has also written for Peter Jenkin, Rob Nairn, Chaconne Brass, Sydney Alpha Ensemble, the Wallace Collection, and for the Kinetic Energy Theatre Company in Sydney . With Hazel Smith, he has created many text and sound works, including Poet without Language, Nuraghic Echoes, The Erotics of Gossip, and The Afterlives of Betsy Scott, all commissioned by the Australian Broadcasting Corporation. He has produced real-time and performative algorithmic works involving interaction between sound and image components (soundAFFECTS, Time The Magician and many other works). He has also collaborated on numerous multimedia (text, sound, image, animation) works of electronic literature, with Hazel Smith and Will Luers winning the international Robert Coover Award of the Electronic Literature Organisation in 2018 for the work Novelling.

Dean's work appears on more than 50 commercial recordings on labels such as Audio Research Editions, Discus, Mosaic Records, [[Soma Recording]], Future Music Records (FMR) (UK); Jade Music, Rufus and Tall Poppies Records (Australia); and Crayon, Cuneiform Records, and Frog Peak Music (US). He has worked with many improvisers, including Derek Bailey, Ashley Brown, Tony Oxley, Evan Parker, Barry Guy, the London Jazz Composers' Orchestra, Ted Curson, Terje Rypdal, John Surman, Tomasz Stańko, and Kenny Wheeler. Dean has also worked with contemporary composers such as Mauricio Kagel, Krzysztof Penderecki, and Karlheinz Stockhausen. His inputs and influence are discussed in interviews such as..

Dean has written and edited several musicological books about jazz, improvisation, and electroacoustic music, his more recent being: the Oxford Handbook of Computer Music (Oxford University Press, 2009; Editor) and the Oxford Handbook of Algorithmic Music (Oxford University Press, 2018; co-Editor, with Alex McLean). His co-edited volume on creative research in the arts has received >1650 Google Scholar citations.

== Academia ==
Dean is also a research academic, previously mainly in biochemistry, and since 2007 solely in musicology and music cognition. He studied Natural Sciences at Cambridge University in England (BA, 1970) and gained his PhD there in biochemistry (1973). Dean has higher doctorates in biology (DSc 1984) and in music (DLitt 2002) from Brunel University in England. He is a former Fellow of the Institute of Biology in England; resigned 2006), a former fellow of the Australian Institute of Company Directors (FAICD; resigned 2013), and an Honorary Fellow of the Australian Academy of Humanities (FAHA). Dean received an Australian Centenary Medal in 2003.

In biochemistry, he worked at University College London, at the Clinical Research Centre of the Medical Research Council (United Kingdom), and at Brunel University, where he became a full professor in 1984. He then migrated to Australia to become the foundation director of the autonomous Heart Research Institute, in Sydney (1988–2002), and took Australian citizenship in 1992. From 2002 to 2007 Dean was the Vice–Chancellor and President of the University of Canberra, Australia, and in 2007 he returned to full-time research as Professor of Sonic Communication at the MARCS Auditory Laboratories (now the MARCS Institute for Brain, Behaviour and Development), University of Western Sydney, studying music cognition and computational analysis and modelling of music, and computational creativity. He also has ongoing collaboration in the Centre for Digital Music at Queen Mary University of London.

Dean has more than 280 substantive publications in biochemistry, and more than 100 in music research. From 2005 to 2008 he was a member of the board of the Australian Music Centre (and chair from 2007–08). Dean has also been a member of several other boards, including the editorial boards of the Biochemical Journal, Clinical Science, Free Radical Biology and Medicine, Redox Report, Critical Studies in Improvisation, inflect and soundsRite.

Dean was elected a Fellow of the Royal Society of New South Wales in 2025.

== Bibliography ==
=== Books on biological science ===
- Davies, M., and Dean, R.T. (1997) Radical Mediated Protein Oxidation: From Chemistry to Medicine. Oxford University Press (pp. 443).
- Dean, R.T. (1977) Lysosomes. Institute of Biology Series, Edward Arnold, London (pp. 90).
- Dean, R.T. (1978) Cellular Degradative Processes. Chapman & Hall, London (pp. 120).
- Dean, R.T. and Jessup, W. eds. (1985) Mononuclear Phagocytes: Physiology and Pathology. Elsevier, Amsterdam (pp. 426).
- Dean, R.T. and Kelly, D.T. eds. (2000) Atherosclerosis: Gene Expression, Cell Interactions and Oxidation. Oxford University Press, Oxford (pp. 450).
- Dean, R.T. and Stahl, P.D. eds. (1985) Developments in Cell Biology: Secretory Processes. Butterworths, London (pp. 234).
- Dingle, J.T. and Dean, R.T. eds. (1975) Lysosomes in Biology and Pathology, Vol. 4. Elsevier, Amsterdam (pp. 614).
- Dingle, J.T. and Dean, R.T. eds. (1976) Lysosomes in Biology and Pathology, Vol. 5. Elsevier, Amsterdam (pp. 404).
- Dingle, J.T., Dean, R.T., and Sly, W. eds. (1984) Lysosomes in Biology and Pathology, Vol. 7. Elsevier, Amsterdam (pp. 479).

=== Books on music ===
- Smith, H. and Dean, R.T. (1997) Improvisation, Hypermedia and the Arts since 1945, Harwood Academic (pp. 334).
- Smith, H. and Dean, R.T., eds. (2009) Practice–Led Research: Research-Led Practice in the Creative Arts. Edinburgh University Press (pp. 278)
- Dean, R.T. (1989) Creative Improvisation: Jazz, Contemporary Music and Beyond. Open University Press, UK/US (pp. 136).
- Dean, R.T. (1991) New Structures in Jazz and Improvised Music Since 1960. Open University Press, UK/US (pp. 230)
- Dean, R.T. (2003) Hyperimprovisation: Computer Interactive Sound Improvisation. A-R Editions, Madison, WI, US (pp. 203).
- Dean, R.T. (2005) Sounds from the Corner: Australian Contemporary Jazz on CD Since 1973. Australian Music Centre, Sydney (pp. 193).
- Dean, R.T., ed. (2009) The Oxford Handbook of Computer Music. Oxford University Press (pp. 595).
- McClean, A., and Dean, R.T., ed. (2018) The Oxford Handbook of Algorithmic Music. Oxford University Press (pp. 710).

== Discography ==
With Graham Collier

- Midnight Blue (Mosaic, 1975)
- New Conditions (Mosaic, 1976)
- Symphony of Scorpions (Mosaic, 1977)
- The Day of the Dead (Mosaic, 1978)
- Hoarded Dreams (Cuneiform, 1983 [2007])
- Something British Made in Hong Kong (Mosaic, 1985 [1987])
- The Third Colour (1998)
- Live at Middelheim, with Workpoints (2005)
- Hoarded Dreams (2007)
- Directing 14 Jackson Pollocks (2009)
- Luminosity: The Last Suites (2014)

With LYSIS/austraLYSIS/the austraLYSIS Electroband

- Lysis Live (Mosaic, 1976)
- Cycles (Mosaic, 1977)
- The Solo Trumpet 1966–1976 (Soma, 1978)
- Dualyses (Soma, 1978)
- Lysis Plus (Mosaic, 1979) with Kenny Wheeler
- Superimpositions (Soma, 1980)
- The Wings of the Whale (Soma, 1987 [1991])
- Moving the Landscapes (Tall Poppies, 1992)
- Windows in Time (Tall Poppies, 1994)
- Poet Without Language (created with Hazel Smith) (1994)
- The Debris of All Certainties on Arc of Light (1994)
- The Next Room (Tall Poppies, 1995)
- Nuraghic Echoes (created with Hazel Smith) (Rufus/Soma, 1996)
- Present Tense (Tall Poppies, 1997)
- Lysis Lives: Resounding in the Mirror (FMR, 2000)
- The Sinking of Rainbow Warrior, with the Song Company (Australian Music Centre, 2000)
- Acouslytic (Tall Poppies, 2001)
- Sonic Stones (Tall Poppies, 2006)
- Ubasuteyama on Music of the Spirit (Wirripang, 2008)
- Multi-PIano (Tall Poppies, 2012)
- History Goes Everywhere (Tall Poppies,2015)
- Music for Soprano Trombone, Piano and Electronics, with Torbjörn Hultmark (Soma/Bandcamp, 2018)
- Dualling (Earshift, 2024)

Music performed by others

- It gets complicated on Australian Piano Miniatures (1994)
- Blues Multiple on A Day in the Life of the Clarinet (1996)
- Flying on We are not Alone (2001)

Other Electroacoustic pieces

- Silent Nuraghi on Assembly (1995)
- Fissuring Silence on Network Vol 1 (1995)
- Dust on The Chris Mann Project (1996)
- The Peace of Molonglo: A Place of Thunder on Unfenced (2008)

Multimedia

- Wordstuffs (1997) commissioned by the Australian Film Commission
- Walking the Faultlines (written with Hazel Smith) on Cyberquilt (1999)
- Numerous online and installation works including :
- with Hazel Smith (text) and Will Luers (image): Film of Sound (2012), Hypnagogia (2013), motions (2013), novelling (2016), Dolphins in the Reservoir (2022)
- with Keith Armstrong and collaborators : Finitude (2011); Long Time, No See (2013); Inter-State (2016)
- with Hazel Smith: Inner Differencing (2026)

As pianist in other contexts

- Arc of Light by Ian Shanahan (Jade CD, 2001)
- In music by Robert Iolini on iolini (2001)

As bassist

- See several recordings by LYSIS/austraLYSIS
- Milhaud String Quintet, Dreams of Jacob with Sonant (KNEW CD 1987)
- Michael Gordon Acid Rain with Spectrum (Composers Recordings Inc 1990)
- Xenakis Epei with Spectrum (Wergo 1991)
- Birtwistle Silbury Air with Sydney Alpha Ensemble (ABC Records 2000)
