= John C. Williams (baritone saxophonist) =

English saxophonist (1941–2025)

John C. Williams (8 February, 1941 – 13 May, 2025) was best known as a baritone saxophonist, though he played many other instruments, including bass saxophone and recorder. He was also a jazz composer, arranger, music educator and co-founder/ organiser of the Music at Leasowes Bank festival.

== Early life ==
Born in North Kensington, London, on 8 February 1941, Williams was the oldest of three siblings. He attended the local Oxford Gardens Primary School where he first learnt the recorder, and at age 10 performed his first radio broadcast as part of the Oxford Gardens Recorder Consort on the BBC's Children’s Hour. By the age of 14, he would be performing live at weddings. He gained a scholarship to Latymer Upper School in Hammersmith, London.

== Music career ==
Aged 21, he founded the sixteen-strong John Williams Big Band, which in 1962 became the resident group at London’s Marquee Club, replacing John Dankworth's group. Playing what was described as 'boisterous big band jazz', it was voted by Jazz News as one the top ten UK jazz bands of that year. The Band played the Richmond Jazz Festival in August 1963.

In the mid-1960s, he worked in Cardiff, as musical director for Harlech Television. He accompanied pop stars – such as Gladys Knight and the Three Degrees – and played for West End shows. He also worked with the Canadian pianist Oscar Peterson and some of the more adventurous British musicians including Keith Tippett, Barry Guy, Norma Winstone, Mike Westbrook and Graham Collier. He played as one of three baritone saxophones in Keith Tippett's fifty-strong prog rock jazz supergroup Centipede in the early 1970s. He also led the ensemble Changing Face (1976–8), the trio Spectrum (from 1985) and the Baritone Band (from 1985). He played on a recording of Duke Ellington's Black Brown and Beige with the Alan Cohen Band in 1973, and worked with Joe Gallivan’s Intercontinental Express (1977–8), and the Don Rendell Nine (1979–81), including on the album Earth Music (1979).

He became increasingly interested in experimenting across the boundary between jazz and classical music. In the mid-1990s, he co-led the twelve-piece jazz/classical ensemble New Perspectives whose recordings with Jacqui Dankworth of jazz songs based on A. E. Housman’s poetry was selected by the Sunday Times as ‘the outstanding British jazz release of 1996’. In 2006, he worked with the Bingham String Quartet performing Dick Walter's 'Excursions for Baritone Saxophone and String Quartet', which he had himself commissioned. He collaborated with poet Roger Garfitt, which led to In All My Holy Mountain (2017), a celebration in jazz and poetry of the life and work of Shropshire poet and novelist Mary Webb. The work of Gerry Mulligan and Duke Ellington, which had influenced his journey into jazz as a younger man, continued to inspire him: in 2003 he released John Williams' Baritone Band, and then moved further up scale with the release of Tenorama in 2003. Most of his recordings were released on Spotlite records, where he worked with producer Tony Williams.

In 1980, he and his wife Frances Williams established the Music at Leasowes Bank festival, at Ratlinghope, Shropshire, which ran for thirty-three years. Each year a classical or jazz composer was commissioned for a work that would be premiered at the Festival – including Michael Nyman, Howard Blake, John Dankworth, Sally Beamish, Diana Burrell, David Matthews, Charles Dakin and Martin Butler. Around fifty original pieces were commissioned across the lifetime of the festival. A work celebrating the nearby Stiperstones was commissioned from Clark Tracey, and would be released as an album by Tracey's quintet in 1987. Neil Ardley's "electronic jazz orchestra" Zyklus performed in 1994. The last festival in 2013 commissioned Shabaka Hutchings to write a piece for clarinet and string quartet, Octavia, named for the afrofuturist science fiction writer Octavia E. Butler, which was performed with the Ligeti Quartet.

He was also a music educator. He instructed in improvisation at early iterations of the National Youth Jazz Orchestra (NYJO), which had begun as a weeklong summer school at the Marquee Club in London. His work at the Moberley Centre in Kilburn, London established an important training ground for young jazz musicians, included saxophonist Chris Hunter (later a member of the Gil Evans Orchestra), free jazz drummer Paul Lytton and trumpeter Dick Pearce. In 1996, he would found, with Chris Bolton, the Shropshire Youth Jazz Ensemble, which he co-led for two decades.

== Discography ==
- Year of the Buffalo (1984) – music by Pete Saberton, played by the John Williams Octet. It was premiered at the Bracknell Festival in 1984.
- New Perspectives Perform Five Housman Settings and Other Jazz Works (1996) – featuring vocalist Jacqui Dankworth and a 12-piece ensemble of jazz players and classical musicians from English Serenata. Williams commissioned four composers to set A. E. Housman's poetry to jazz music: John Dankworth, Patrick Gowers, Andrea Vicari and Dick Walter. His own contribution was a setting of When Summer's End is Nighing. The album was released on the hundreth anniversary of the publication of Housman's A Shropshire Lad, and was selected as the outstanding UK jazz release of 1996 by the Sunday Times. The project was explored as part of a Radio 3 programme on 5 April 1997.
- John Williams' Baritone Band (2000) – an ensemble of four baritone saxes and rhythm section, including Chris Biscoe, John Surman, Jay Craig and Alan Wakeman.
- Tenorama (2003) – a project that brought together tenor saxophonists from an older generation (Don Rendell, Dave Gelly and Phil Day) with younger players such as Renato D’Aiello and Karen Sharp.
- In All My Holy Mountain (2017) settings of Roger Garfitt’s poetry to music by Nikki Iles, played by the John Williams Octet. Williams commissioned the music. It was reviewed in Uk Jazz News.

== Obituary ==
For an obituary from UK Jazz News.
