= Derek Wadsworth =

British musical artist (1939–2008)

- Born: 5 February 1939; Cleckheaton, Yorkshire, England
- Died: 3 December 2008 (aged 69)
- Genres: Jazz
- Occupations: Musician; Composer; Arranger
- Instruments: Trombone, keyboards

Derek Wadsworth (5 February 1939 – 3 December 2008) was an English jazz musician, composer, and arranger.

== Early life ==
Wadsworth was born in Cleckheaton, Yorkshire, on 5 February 1939. He began playing the cornet as his first instrument and started playing the trombone at the age of eleven.

== Later life and career ==
Wadsworth played in bands in Huddersfield in the late 1950s. He was based in London from the early 1960s and played in several bands. He was musical director for singer Dusty Springfield in the mid-1960s, and for a Diana Ross world tour, and held the same position in the musical Hair for five years from 1968. He first arranged music in 1970, for Spring and Port Wine.

As a musician, he toured Europe with Georgie Fame and was with Humphrey Lyttelton into the mid-1970s. Wadsworth toured the United States with Maynard Ferguson in 1972, as well as recording with the bandleader. He also had lengthy periods in the 1970s with Graham Collier and John Dankworth. Wadsworth founded the Musicians Union's Rock Workshop and lectured there in the latter part of the decade. He also led his own sextet. In 1975 he arranged for Alfie Darling and in the following year he composed and arranged for the 24-part television drama Space: 1999 (including this second series's newly-composed main theme tune) and worked on the film The Man Who Fell to Earth.

Wadsworth was also busy as a session musician, including for recordings by Tony Bennett, George Harrison, Tom Jones and Dionne Warwick. Years later, he commented: "We flitted from one studio to the next, never quite knowing what we had recorded [...] Now that there's money available for people who played on records of yesteryear we're all busy scrabbling about trying to find out who did what." For some projects, Wadsworth played electronic keyboards and was credited as Daniel Caine.

By the 1980s he was concentrating on film composing and arranging, but also led the band Blind Alley. He was involved in the 1983 film Britannia Hospital. He was able to continue playing jazz into the 1990s, in bands led by Harry Gold, Brian Priestley and Bob Wilber. In the same decade he also conducted the Prague Symphony Orchestra for recordings and was involved in the documentary film Wild Man Blues.

In the 2000s, his playing included a quintet that he co-led with Ray Warleigh. Wadsworth wrote around two hundred pieces of music for television advertisements. He died suddenly on 3 December 2008. His wife, Betty, died in 1987 and he is survived by his partner, Patsy Halliday, and a son and a daughter from his marriage.

== Selected discography ==
- Hair (Original London Cast Recording) 1968

With Graham Collier

- Songs for My Father (Fontana, 1970)
- Darius (Mosaic, 1974)
- Midnight Blue (Mosaic, 1975)
- Space: 1999 year 2 (CD, Fanderson. Original incidental music from the series, released in 2000)
- Space: 1999 year 2 (CD, Fanderson. Original incidental music from the series, re-released posthumously in 2016)

With Bill Tarmey (production, arrangement, trombone)

- A Gift of Love (1993)
- Time for Love (1994)
- After Hours (1996)
- In My Life (2001)
