= Song for My Father =

Song for My Father may refer to:

- "Song for My Father" (composition), by Horace Silver, 1964
- Song for My Father (album), by Horace Silver, 1965
- "Song for My Father", a song by Sarah McLachlan from Shine On, 2014

== See also ==
- Songs for My Father, an album by Graham Collier, 1970
