= Henrik Bolberg Pedersen =

Danish trumpeter and flugelhorn player

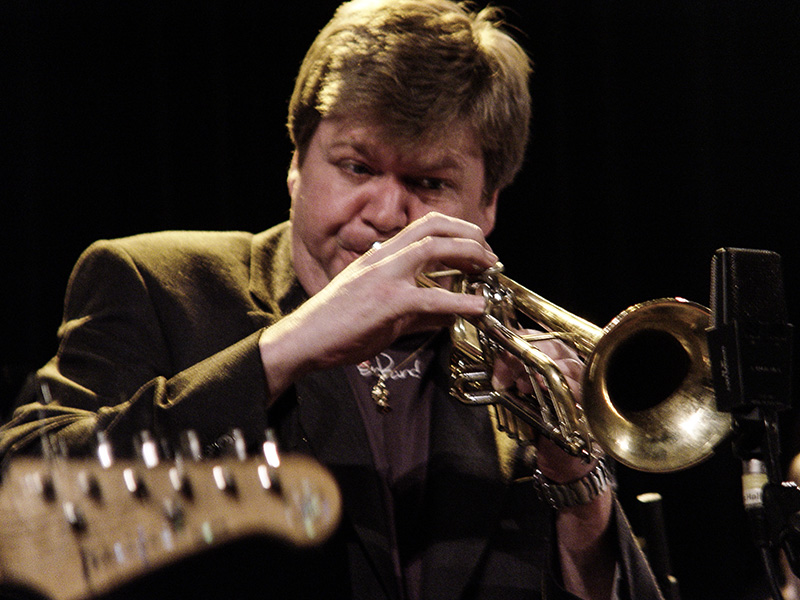
Henrik Bolberg playing with DR Big Band & Mike Stern, Chopenhagen Denmark 2006

Henrik Bolberg Pedersen (born 15 October 1960) is a Danish trumpeter and flugelhorn player with the Danish Radio Jazz Orchestra.

== Collaborations ==
Pedersen has also been credited as a session musician for notable artists including (but not limited to):

- Tommy Flanagan - Flanagan's Shenanigans (Storyville, 1993)
- Geri Allen - Some Aspects of Water (Storyville, 1996)
- Tony Coe
- Django Bates
- Graham Collier - Winter Oranges (Jazzprint, 2000 [2002])

== Awards ==
Pedersen placed first in the 1987 edition of the biennial European Jazz Competition.
