= Alan Wakeman =

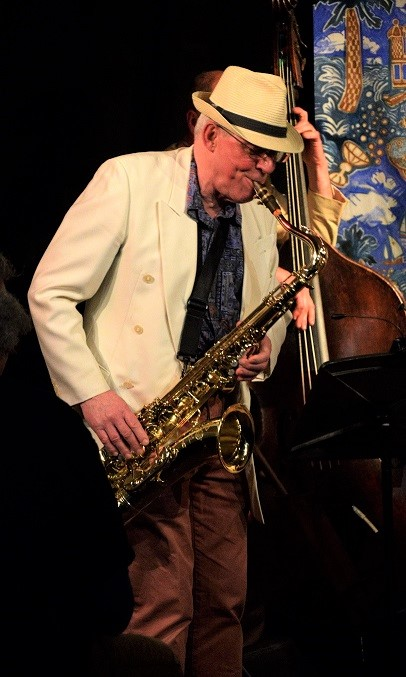
- Alan Wakeman performing in Mike Westbrook's show, Paintbox Jane (Exeter, April 2017)

Background information
- Born: 13 October 1947 (age 78); Hammersmith, West London, England
- Occupation: Musician
- Instrument: Saxophone
- Years active: 1968–present
- Formerly of: Soft Machine
- Website: alanwakeman.org

Alan Wakeman (born 13 October 1947) is an English saxophonist who was a member of Soft Machine during 1976, appearing on the album Softs. He is a cousin of the keyboard player Rick Wakeman.

== Career ==
Wakeman started on the clarinet at age 14 and, while at school, played in a band with cousin Rick on piano. He switched to the alto saxophone at 16, then subsequently to the tenor saxophone; he also plays soprano saxophone.

He joined the Paul Lytton Quartet in 1968 and had his own trio in 1970 (with Harry Miller on bass). He subsequently worked with Graham Collier (including the albums Songs for My Father and The Day of the Dead), Johnny Dankworth and Mike Westbrook (including playing saxophone and clarinet on the 1975 album Citadel/Room 315 and 1976's Love/Dream and Variations). He was also an original member of Alan Gowen's band Gilgamesh in 1972–3 but left before Gilgamesh's first album.

He left Soft Machine in 1976 to join David Essex's band, having first worked with him in 1974 on the album David Essex. He also worked further with Westbrook and in the West End, including for the musical Grease. He has toured with Mike Westbrook's Uncommon Orchestra on A Bigger Show and with Westbrook on his new jazz show Paintbox Jane.

== Discography ==
=== As leader ===
- Triton Wilderness of Glass (Awake 001, 1978, 2011)
- The Octet Broadcasts 1969 and 1979 (Gearbox, 2020)

=== As sideman ===
With Pete Atkin

- Driving Through Mythical America (Philips, 1971)
- A King at Nightfall (RCA Victor, 1973)
- Beware of the Beautiful Stranger (Edsel, 2009)

With Graham Collier

- Songs for My Father (Fontana, 1970)
- Mosaics (Philips, 1971)
- Jazz Illustrations (Resources of Music, 1975)
- New Conditions (Mosaic, 1976)
- The Day of the Dead (Mosaic, 1978)

With David Essex

- David Essex (CBS, 1974)
- All the Fun of the Fair (CBS, 1975)
- On Tour (CBS, 1976)
- Gold & Ivory (CBS, 1977)
- Imperial Wizard (Mercury, 1979)
- Hot Love (Mercury, 1980)
- Silver Dream Racer (Mercury, 1980)
- Stage Struck (Mercury, 1982)
- The Whisper (Mercury, 1983)
- This One's for You (Mercury, 1984)

With Mike Westbrook

- Citadel/Room 315 (RCA Victor, 1975)
- Love/Dream and Variations (Transatlantic, 1976)
- The Westbrook Blake (Original, 1980)
- The Paris Album (Polydor, 1981)
- Off Abbey Road (Tiptoe, 1990)
- Bar Utopia (ASC, 1996)
- The Orchestra of Smith's Academy (Enja, 1998)
- Glad Day (Enja, 1999)
- A Bigger Show (ASC, 2016)
- Catania (Westbrook, 2018)
- In Memory of Lou Gare Tenor Saxophone (Westbrook, 2018)
- After Abbey Road (Westbrook, 2019)

With others

- Harry Beckett, Still Happy (My Only Desire, 2016)
- John Williams' Baritone Band (Spotlite, 2000)
- John Dankworth, Movies 'n' Me (RCA, 1974)
- Girls at Our Best!, Pleasure (Happy Birthday, 1981)
- Barry Guy/London Jazz Composers Orchestra, Ode (Incus, 1972)
- London Jazz Composers Orchestra, That Time (Not Two 2020)
- Harry Miller, Different Times, Different Places Vol. Two (Ogun, 2016)
- National Youth Jazz Orchestra, National Youth Jazz Orchestra (Philips, 1971)
- Don Rendell, Earth Music (Spotlite, 1979)
- Soft Machine, Softs (Harvest, 1976)
- Soft Machine, The Untouchable (Castle, 1990)
- Swans Way, The Fugitive Kind (Balgier/Phonogram, 1984)
- Stan Tracey, The Crompton Suite (Steam, 1981)

== Sources ==
- John Chilton (ed.),Who's Who of British Jazz (London; New York : Continuum, 2004, 2nd Edition), p. 371
- R. Fagge and N. Pillai (eds.), New Jazz Conceptions (London: Routledge, 2017), p. 137
- Duncan Heining, Mosaics: The Life and Works of Graham Collier (Equinox Publishing Ltd, 2018)
- Matthew Wright, ‘Annie Whitehead’s Interplay bring Township sounds to Leamington’, JazzWise Magazine, 2 May 2018
