= Darius (album) =

Live album by Graham Collier Music
- Released: 1974
- Recorded: 13 March 1974
- Venue: Cranfield Institute of Technology, Bedfordshire, England
- Genre: Jazz
- Length: 49:35
- Label: Mosaic; GCM 741
- Producer: Graham Collier

Graham Collier chronology
Portraits (1972)	Darius (1974)	Midnight Blue (1975)

Darius is a live album by composer/bassist Graham Collier which was originally released on his own Mosaic label in 1974.

== Reception ==
Professional ratings
Review scores
Source	Rating
Allmusic	4.5/5 stars
All About Jazz	5/5 stars
The Penguin Guide to Jazz Recordings	3.5/4 stars

Allmusic said "This is easily the finest of Collier's early works; it breathes and moves and changes shape, tone, and intent, and comes off as a master work of balance between composition and improvisation". On All About Jazz Nic Jones noted "It might be argued that the six-piece band featured on both Darius and Midnight Blue is one of the best Collier has ever headed".

== Track listing ==
All compositions by Graham Collier.

1. "Darius" – 27:15
2. "Darius (Conclusion)" – 16:30
3. "A New Dawn" – 5:30

== CD Track listing ==
All compositions by Graham Collier.

1. "Darius part 1" – 9:39
2. "Darius part 2" – 5:10
3. "Darius part 3" – 20:19
4. "Darius part 4" – 8:47
5. "A New Dawn" – 5:35

== Personnel ==
- Graham Collier – bass
- Harry Beckett – trumpet, flugelhorn
- Derek Wadsworth – trombone
- Ed Speight – guitar
- Geoff Castle – electric piano
- John Webb – drums
