= New Conditions =

1976 studio album by Graham Collier Music

Studio album by Graham Collier Music
- Released: 1976
- Recorded: 2–3 June 1976; Nettlebed, Oxfordshire, England
- Genre: Jazz
- Length: 42:38
- Label: Mosaic; GCM 761
- Producer: Graham Collier

Graham Collier chronology
Midnight Blue (1975)	New Conditions (1976)	Symphony of Scorpions (1977)

New Conditions is an album by composer Graham Collier that was originally released on his own Mosaic label in 1976.

== Reception ==
Professional ratings
Review scores
Source	Rating
Allmusic	3/5 stars
All About Jazz	5/5 stars
The Penguin Guide to Jazz Recordings	3.5/4 stars

AllMusic said: "This is a frustrating composition in many ways because of all its gaps, and they are the most trouble of all. Collier has composed a mirror image of traditional jazz charts: this is all freely improvised, with certain scored 'interruptions' for the ensemble. The effect is stultifying. The 'free flow' at the heart of the conceptualization of this work feels hackneyed, as clearly not all of the musicians here are 'free' improvisers. Sorry, as brilliant as Collier is, this one falls short of the mark for him." On All About Jazz, Nic Jones noted: "New Conditions is a particularly apposite title ... Collier is still playing bass but it's clear that his music's evolution is in a sense altering his own status within it. Even in the introduction, it's apparent that elements of the free are assuming a higher profile, but it's clear too that the way in which Collier is marshalling the larger ensemble heralds the music still to come, and not merely in terms of the overall conception of the album."

== Track listing ==
All compositions by Graham Collier.

1. "Introduction" – 4:05
2. "Part One & Two" – 8:30
3. "Part Three" – 3:45
4. "Part Four" 5:20
5. "Part Five & Six" – 7:30
6. "Part Seven" – 3:55
7. "Part Eight" – 5:00
8. "Finale" – 3:45

== Personnel ==
- Graham Collier – composer, director, bass
- Harry Beckett – trumpet
- Pete Duncan – trumpet
- Henry Lowther – trumpet
- Art Themen – soprano saxophone
- Alan Wakeman – soprano saxophone
- Mike Page – alto saxophone
- Malcolm Griffiths – trombone
- Ed Speight – guitar
- Roger Dean – piano
- John Webb – drums
- John Mitchell – percussion
