= Something British Made in Hong Kong =

Live album by Graham Collier Music
- Released: 1987
- Recorded: December 1985; Hong Kong
- Genre: Jazz
- Length: 49:06
- Label: Mosaic; GCMD 871
- Producer: Graham Collier

Graham Collier chronology
Hoarded Dreams (1983)	Something British Made in Hong Kong (1987)	Charles River Fragments (1994)

Something British Made in Hong Kong is a live album by composer Graham Collier featuring a six-part composition written especially for the groups British Council organized Far-East tour which was originally released on his own Mosaic label in 1987.

== Reception ==
Professional ratings
Review scores
Source	Rating
Allmusic	2.5/5 stars
The Penguin Guide to Jazz Recordings	2/4 stars

Allmusic said "This album is a mess, full of meandering twists and turns that reveal just how completely Collier had lost his way in the previous decade. Oh yes, and the sound is muddy, almost atrocious".

A slightly different critic comes from Steve Loewy that wrote: "Although the sound quality on the CD reissue is adequate (evidently it was worse on the original LP issue on Mosaic), it does not compensate for the lack of focus, which is likely to disappoint Colliers's followers, particularly considering that the album was released after the composer's superb Day of the Dead, after a hiatus of several years The heavy use of synthesizers and electric guitar in the sextet coupled with sometimes mediocre improvisations and a generally open approach to composition leaves the listener's ears wandering"

== Track listing ==
All compositions by Graham Collier.

1. "Midsummer Dawn" – 9:29
2. "Whiligig" – 9:02
3. "Mist on Water" – 5:47
4. "Queensbury Rules" – 9:07
5. "Spring Rain" – 4:07
6. "Deserted Funfair" – 11:34

== Personnel ==
- Graham Collier – composer, arranger, synthesizer
- Geoff Warren – soprano saxophone, alto saxophone, flute, alto flute
- Malcolm Griffiths – trombone
- Ed Speight – guitar
- Roger Dean – piano, synthesizer
- Paul Bridge – bass
- Ashley Brown – drums, percussion
