= Mosaics (Graham Collier album) =

Live album by Graham Collier Music featuring Harry Beckett
- Released: 1971
- Recorded: 8 December 1970
- Venue: The Torrington, North Finchley, England
- Genre: Jazz
- Length: 40:30
- Label: Philips; 6308 051
- Producer: Terry Brown

Graham Collier chronology
| Songs for My Father (1970) | Mosaics (1971) | Portraits (1972) |

Mosaics is a live album by composer/bassist Graham Collier which was originally released on the British Philips label in 1971.

== Reception ==
Professional ratings
Review scores
| Source | Rating |
|---|---|
| Allmusic | 4/5 stars |
| All About Jazz | 5/5 stars |

Allmusic said "Mosaics is one of Collier's most provocative works yet, and stands the test of time extremely well". On All About Jazz Nic Jones noted "As a bandleader Collier was by this time fashioning some distinctive frameworks for improvisation, and the group as a whole, with alto and tenor saxophonist Bob Sydor joining Beckett and Wakeman in the front line, seems so "bedded in" with Collier's work that the result is only stimulating listening of a rarefied order".

== Track listing ==
All compositions by Graham Collier.

1. "Piano Cadenza (Including Theme 1)" – 2:00
2. "Theme 1 (Ensemble) and Flugel Solo" – 5:58
3. "Duet Flugel and Soprano and Soprano Cadenza (Including Theme 4)" – 2:51
4. "Theme 2 (Soprano and Rhythm) and Soprano Solo" – 3:42
5. "Drum Cadenza (Including Theme 2) Into Theme 3 (Ensemble)" – 4:10
6. "Flugel Cadenza (Including Theme 4) Duet Bass / Flugel" – 3:48
7. "Theme 6 (Ensemble) and Tenor Solo (Sydor)" – 5:01
8. "Tenor Cadenza (Sydor) and Tenor Duet" – 2:00
9. "Piano Cadenza Into Theme 2 (Piano and Rhythm)" – 4:40
10. "Flugel Solo Over Theme 8 in Tenors" – 6:07

== Personnel ==
- Graham Collier – bass
- Harry Beckett – trumpet, flugelhorn
- Alan Wakeman – tenor saxophone, soprano saxophone
- Bob Sydor – tenor saxophone, alto saxophone
- Geoff Castle – piano
- John Webb – drums
