= Symphony of Scorpions =

1977 live album by Graham Collier Music

Live album / Studio album by Graham Collier Music
- Released: 1977
- Recorded: 7 November 1976 and 10 March 1977
- Venue: Ronnie Scott's Jazz Club, London and Bix, Oxfordshire, England
- Genre: Jazz
- Length: 45:42
- Label: Mosaic; GCM 773
- Producer: Graham Collier

Graham Collier chronology
New Conditions (1976)	Symphony of Scorpions (1977)	The Day of the Dead (1978)

Symphony of Scorpions is a live album by composer/bassist Graham Collier featuring eponymous composition recorded at Ronnie Scott's Jazz Club in 1976 which was originally released on his own Mosaic label in 1977.

== Reception ==
Professional ratings
Review scores
Source	Rating
Allmusic	4/5 stars
The Penguin Guide to Jazz Recordings	3.5/4 stars
DownBeat	4/5 stars

Allmusic said "At times indulgent, and at others very sparse, the ensemble moves along with excellent focus, drama, and tension, allowing for groupings of smaller units inside the ensemble to carry the motion of this seemingly directionless ramble forward -- all the while honing in on Collier's small-figured place of balance within movement. This is an arduous listen, but is far more successful at sustenance and creative dialogue than New Conditions was, and showcases Collier as having fully embraced the vanguard, and as being very comfortable writing for such a large group".

== Track listing ==
All compositions by Graham Collier.

1. "Part 1" - 10:40
2. "Part 2" - 7:32
3. "Parts 3 & 4" - 13:20
4. "Forest Path to the Spring" - 4:10
- Recorded at Ronnie Scott's Jazz Club in London on 7 November 1976 (tracks 1–3 and in Bix, Oxfordshire on 10 March 1977 (track 4

== Personnel ==
- Graham Collier – composer, director, bass
- Harold Beckett – trumpet (tracks 1–3)
- Pete Duncan – trumpet (tracks 1–3)
- Henry Lowther – trumpet (tracks 1–3)
- Art Themen – tenor saxophone, soprano saxophone
- Mike Page – alto saxophone, soprano saxophone (tracks 1–3)
- Tony Roberts – alto saxophone, soprano saxophone (tracks 1–3)
- Malcolm Griffiths – trombone (tracks 1–3)
- Ed Speight – guitar
- Roger Dean – piano (tracks 1–3)
- John Webb – drums (tracks 1–3)
- John Mitchell – percussion (tracks 1–3)
