= Winter Oranges =

Live album by Graham Collier & the Danish Radio Jazz Orchestra
- Released: 2002
- Recorded: 17 November 2000
- Venue: Copenhagen Jazzhouse, Denmark
- Genre: Jazz
- Length: 49:25
- Label: Jazzprint; JPVP126CD
- Producer: Graham Collier

Graham Collier chronology
The Third Colour (1997)	Winter Oranges (2002)	Bread and Circuses (2001)

Winter Oranges is a live album by composer Graham Collier accompanied by the Danish Radio Jazz Orchestra featuring a four-part composition written especially for the group which was released on the Jazzprint label in 2002.

== Reception ==
Professional ratings
Review scores
Source	Rating
Allmusic	3/5 stars
The Penguin Guide to Jazz Recordings	3/4 stars

Allmusic said "The well-rehearsed orchestra, which has long performed original works by Collier, interprets these difficult pieces well, with tight sound and universally strong solos ... Through the years Collier has consistently showed an affinity for nuance, color, and texture without sacrificing the emotional spontaneity that is at the heart of jazz, somewhat in the vein of Gil Evans. Collier continues to hone his craft, and the results here testify to his past achievements and continued creativity".

== Track listing ==
All compositions by Graham Collier.

1. "Three Simple Pieces: Part One" - 5:48
2. "Three Simple Pieces: Part Three" - 6:48
3. "Winter Oranges: Blue Spring" - 9:21
4. "Winter Oranges: Eggshell Summer" - 13:41
5. "Winter Oranges: Tinted Autumn" - 6:03
6. "Winter Oranges: Winter Oranges" - 7:44

== Personnel ==
- Graham Collier – composer
- Anders Gustafsson – trumpet, flugelhorn
- Benny Rosenfeld – trumpet, flugelhorn
- Thomas Fryland – trumpet, flugelhorn
- Henrik Bolberg – trumpet, flugelhorn
- Knud Erik Norregaard – trumpet, flugelhorn
- Vincent Nilsson – trombone
- Steen Hansen – trombone
- Peter Jensen – trombone
- Annette Husby – trombone
- Axel Windfeld – bass trombone, tuba
- Michael Hove – alto saxophone, soprano saxophone, clarinet
- Nikolai Schultz – alto saxophone, soprano saxophone, alto flute
- Uffe Markussen – tenor saxophone, clarinet, bass clarinet
- Tomas Franck – tenor saxophone, soprano saxophone
- Flemming Madsen – baritone saxophone, bass clarinet
- Nikolaj Bentzon – piano
- Thomas Ovesen – bass
- Anders Chico Lindvall – guitar
- Soren Frost – drums
- Ethan Weisgard – percussion
