= Down Another Road =

Studio album by Graham Collier Sextet
- Released: 1969
- Recorded: 21–22 March 1969; London, England
- Genre: Jazz
- Length: 48:02
- Label: Fontana; SFJL 922
- Producer: Terry Brown

Graham Collier chronology
Deep Dark Blue Centre (1967)	Down Another Road (1969)	Songs for My Father (1970)

Down Another Road is an album by composer/bassist Graham Collier recorded in 1969 and originally released on the British Fontana label.

== Reception ==
Professional ratings
Review scores
Source	Rating
Allmusic	3/5 stars
All About Jazz	5/5 stars

Allmusic said "Collier is an original writer. His works are generally tonally centered and contain melody, but he encourages collective improvisation and stretched harmonies. His pieces carefully balance emotional depth and intellectual rigor, with wonderful harmonies and consistently high levels of performance. This one hits the mark with its carefully constructed compositions and magnificent improvisations". On All About Jazz Nic Jones noted "Collier's working methods, even at this relatively early stage of his career, already had something distinctive about them, and he was blessed in enjoying the services of musicians capable of bringing his ideas to fruition".

== Track listing ==
All compositions by Graham Collier except where noted.

1. "Down Another Road" – 5:09
2. "Danish Blue" – 17:30
3. "The Barley Mow" – 5:30
4. "Aberdeen Angus" – 6:02
5. "Lullaby for a Lonely Child" (Karl Jenkins) – 5:35
6. "Molewrench" – 8:54

== Personnel ==
- Graham Collier – bass
- Harry Beckett – flugelhorn
- Nick Evans – trombone
- Stan Sulzmann – alto saxophone, tenor saxophone
- Karl Jenkins – piano, oboe
- John Marshall – drums
