= Live at the Bracknell Jazz Festival, 1986 =

Live album by Don Cherry
- Released: 2002
- Recorded: July 5, 1986
- Venue: Bracknell Jazz Festival, Bracknell, England
- Genre: Free jazz
- Label: BBC Worldwide; BBCJ 7004-2

Live at the Bracknell Jazz Festival, 1986 is a live album by trumpeter Don Cherry. It was recorded in July 1986 at the Bracknell Jazz Festival in Bracknell, England, and was released on CD in 2002 by BBC Worldwide as part of their Jazz Legends series. On the album, Cherry is joined by members of the group called Nu: saxophonist and flutist Carlos Ward, percussionist Naná Vasconcelos, bassist Mark Helias, and drummer Ed Blackwell. Ward, Vasconcelos, and Blackwell would later appear together on Cherry's 1990 album Multikulti.

== Reception ==
Professional ratings
Review scores
Source	Rating
AllMusic	4.5/5 stars
The Penguin Guide to Jazz	3/4 stars

The authors of The Penguin Guide to Jazz Recordings wrote: "Ward's reeling, bop-tinged solos... are a major feature, and so too is Vasconcelos's party-piece 'O Berimbau'. Don squeezes off tight notes and phrases and there is more trumpet-playing than on some occasions."

In a review for Jazz Times, Bill Shoemaker commented: "Live at the Bracknell Jazz Festival, 1986 confirms Nu to be an ensemble that vigorously and cogently articulated the various aspects of the multi-instrumentalist's multicultural aesthetic... this exceptional concert recording fills a significant gap in Cherry's discography... Live at Bracknell is a good indicator of why Cherry's influence on subsequent generations is unique and apart from Coleman's."

Garry Booth of the BBC Music Magazine called the album "gripping stuff," and stated that Nu was interesting because "it combined several of Cherry's incarnations: drummer Ed Blackwell who he played alongside in Ornette Coleman's Fifties free groups; Panamanian altoist Carlos Ward, who provided the bridge between free and 'world music'; and Nana Vasconcelos, who helped him absorb Brazilian music. So this session... reveals all those different aspects of the avant-garde multi-instrumentalist."

== Track listing ==
1. "Lito" (Carlos Ward) – 23:29
2. "Chopin Chopeen" (Ornette Coleman) – 9:01
3. "Foolish Heart" (Carlos Ward) – 6:58
4. "Traffic" (Ornette Coleman) – 6:39
5. "O Berimbau" (Naná Vasconcelos) – 4:35
6. "Untitled" (Carlos Ward) – 11:20
7. "Limbo" (Mark Helias) – 8:37
8. "Mopti" (Don Cherry) – 5:00

== Personnel ==
- Don Cherry – trumpet, doussn'gouni, piano, vocals
- Carlos Ward – alto saxophone, flute
- Naná Vasconcelos – percussion, berimbau, vocals
- Mark Helias – bass
- Ed Blackwell – drums
