= Midnight Blue (Graham Collier album) =

Studio album by Graham Collier Music
- Released: 1975
- Recorded: 17 February 1975; Nettlebed, Oxfordshire, England
- Genre: Jazz
- Length: 47:05
- Label: Mosaic; GCM 751
- Producer: Graham Collier

Graham Collier chronology
Darius (1974)	Midnight Blue (1975)	New Conditions (1976)

Midnight Blue is an album by composer/bassist Graham Collier recorded in 1975 and originally released on his own Mosaic label.

== Reception ==
Professional ratings
Review scores
Source	Rating
Allmusic	3/5 stars
All About Jazz	5/5 stars
The Penguin Guide to Jazz Recordings	3/4 stars

Allmusic said "these pieces on Midnight Blue all feel very ponderous, open, and yet unyielding. This is uncharacteristic of most of Collier's work, and it feels as if even he didn't know what he was going for when he wrote these works. The lilting swing that is at the heart of his best work is absent here, and this feels more like an ECM recording than anything else". On All About Jazz Nic Jones noted "It might be argued that the six-piece band featured on both Darius and Midnight Blue is one of the best Collier has ever headed".

== Track listing ==
All compositions by Graham Collier.

1. "Midnight Blue" – 22:48
2. "Adam" – 7:02
3. "Cathedra" – 17:15

== Personnel ==
- Graham Collier – composer, director, bass
- Harry Beckett – trumpet, flugelhorn
- Derek Wadsworth – trombone
- Ed Speight – guitar
- Roger Dean – piano
- John Webb – drums
