= Deep Dark Blue Centre =

Studio album by The Graham Collier Septet
- Released: 1967
- Recorded: 15, 18 & 24 January 1967
- Studio: Jackson Studios, Rickmansworth, Hertfordshire, England
- Genre: Jazz
- Length: 39:08
- Label: Deram; DML/SML 1005
- Producer: John Jackson and Malcolm Jackson

Graham Collier chronology
Deep Dark Blue Centre (1967)	Down Another Road (1969)

Deep Dark Blue Centre is the debut album by composer and bassist Graham Collier recorded in 1967 and originally released on the British Deram label.

== Reception ==
Professional ratings
Review scores
Source	Rating
Allmusic	4/5 stars
All About Jazz	5/5 stars
The Penguin Guide to Jazz Recordings	3.5/4 stars

Allmusic said "Collier's wonderfully diverse compositions are waiting to be discovered by a new generation, as his timeless, carefully crafted structures are charmingly alluring. Although this is not in any sense earth-shattering, or even groundbreaking, it is albums such as this one upon which Collier's reputation stands, and this satisfying release is a wonderful addition to his oeuvre". On All About Jazz Nic Jones noted "the quasi-impressionistic tones of Deep Dark Blue Centre echo the work of Gil Evans, albeit with a more rhythmically animated sense. Collier's composerly aims are aided in no small part by his sidemen, with Karl Jenkins's oboe topping things off in some of the ensembles and Dave Aaron's dry alto sax and the always deeply worthwhile trumpet of Harry Beckett outstanding in the solo stakes".

== Track listing ==
All compositions by Graham Collier except as noted.

1. "Blue Walls" (Charlie Mariano) - 4:32
2. "El Miklos" - 3:15
3. "Hirayoshi Suite" - 5:55
4. "Crumblin' Cookie" - 5:21
5. "Conversations" - 6:42
6. "Deep Dark Blue Centre" - 13:23

== Personnel ==
- Graham Collier - bass
- Harry Beckett (tracks 1, 3 & 4), Kenny Wheeler (tracks 2, 5 & 6) - trumpet, flugelhorn
- Michael Gibbs - trombone
- Dave Aaron - alto saxophone, flute
- Karl Jenkins - baritone saxophone, oboe
- Philip Lee - guitar
- John Marshall - drums
