= The Day of the Dead (album) =

1978 studio album by Graham Collier

Studio album by Graham Collier
- Released: 1978
- Recorded: March/April 1978; Nettlebed, Oxfordshire, England
- Genre: Jazz
- Length: 83:23
- Label: Mosaic; GCMD 783/4
- Producer: Graham Collier

Graham Collier chronology
Symphony of Scorpions (1977)	The Day of the Dead (1978)	Hoarded Dreams (1983)

The Day of the Dead is an album by composer Graham Collier featuring his composition to accompany the writings of Malcolm Lowry, released on Collier's own Mosaic label in 1978 as a double LP.

== Reception ==
Professional ratings
Review scores
Source	Rating
All About Jazz	4/5 stars
AllMusic	4.5/5 stars
The Penguin Guide to Jazz Recordings	3/4 stars

AllMusic said: "Collier's love of Malcolm Lowry's texts from his time in Mexico became an obsession, and this work is the biggest payoff for it, whether or not it was understood in its own time ... Collier's vision here is focused, intense, and spiritually charged by Lowry's work. This is not some jazz with text, where a written text becomes the thematic cause of a group of instrumentalists, but more a series of passages that offered great textural and spiritual depth and dimension by this obviously on fire group of musicians. This is vanguard music, but it is far from "free jazz." The gorgeous chromatic range is almost overwhelming as these players entwine around one another, and the text, further extending the entire notion of collaboration between literature and jazz". On All About Jazz, Nic Jones noted "Collier could call upon a roster of players every bit as committed to the task of taking his music off the page as Duke Ellington did and, over the course of this work, proven by likes of guitarist Ed Speight and saxophonists Alan Wakeman and Art Themen. All three turn in potent solos, highlighting the symbiotic qualities that were always a mark of Collier's writing".

== Track listing ==
All compositions by Graham Collier with text by Malcolm Lowry

1. "Parts 1 & 2" – 21:02
2. "Part 3" – 8:18
3. "Part 4" – 13:08
4. "Part 5" – 4:48
5. "Part 6" – 5:06
6. "Parts 7 & 8" – 7:44
7. "October Ferry" – 23:15

== Personnel ==
- Graham Collier – composer, director, keyboards
- John Carbery – narrator
- Harold Beckett, Pete Duncan, Henry Lowther – trumpet, flugelhorn
- Alan Wakeman – tenor saxophone, soprano saxophone, bass clarinet
- Art Themen – tenor saxophone, soprano saxophone
- Mike Page – alto saxophone, soprano saxophone, alto flute
- Malcolm Griffiths – trombone
- Ed Speight – guitar
- Roger Dean – piano
- Roy Babbington – bass
- Ashley Brown – drums, percussion
- Alan Jackson – drums
