= Portraits (Graham Collier album) =

Studio album by Graham Collier Music
- Released: 1973
- Recorded: 16 & 17 November 1972
- Studio: RG Jones, London
- Genre: Jazz
- Length: 37:54
- Label: Saydisc; SDL 244
- Producer: Terry Brown

Graham Collier chronology
Mosaics (1970)	Portraits (1973)	Darius (1974)

Portraits is an album by composer/bassist Graham Collier recorded in 1972 and originally released on the Bristol Saydisc label.

== Reception ==
Professional ratings
Review scores
Source	Rating
Allmusic	4/5 stars
All About Jazz	5/5 stars
The Penguin Guide to Jazz Recordings	3/4 stars

Allmusic said "This is a more laid-back, yet more challenging listen than any previous Collier outing, but it also dates as one of the best". On All About Jazz Nic Jones noted "it's an outstanding example of work in the modal idiom. With small groups, Collier had really telling abilities that have been banished to the past by his work with large ensembles in the intervening years, but no matter. Here he manages again to coax maximum mileage and color out of a six piece band".

== Track listing ==
All compositions by Graham Collier.

1. "And Now for Something Completely Different Part One" – 16:50
2. "And Now for Something Completely Different Part Two" – 9:57
3. "Portraits 1" – 10:57

== Personnel ==
- Graham Collier – bass
- Dick Pearce – flugelhorn
- Peter Hurt – alto saxophone
- Ed Speight – guitar
- Geoff Castle – piano
- John Webb – drums
