= Hoarded Dreams =

Live album by Graham Collier
- Released: 16 January 2007
- Recorded: July 1983
- Venue: Bracknell Jazz Festival, England
- Genre: Jazz
- Length: 70:16
- Label: Cuneiform; RUNE 252
- Producer: Graham Collier

Graham Collier chronology
The Day of the Dead (1977)	Hoarded Dreams (2007)	Something British Made in Hong Kong (1985)

Hoarded Dreams is a live album by bassist/composer Graham Collier featuring a composition commissioned for the Bracknell Jazz Festival by the Arts Council of Great Britain in 1983 and released on the Cuneiform label in 2007.

== Reception ==
Professional ratings
Review scores
Source	Rating
Allmusic	4.5/5 stars
Penguin Guide to Jazz	4/4 stars
Jazzwise	4/5 stars
All About Jazz	5/5 stars

Allmusic said "It features the cream of '80s U.K. jazz talent ... in a seamless combination of part-written, part-improvised big-band performance". The Penguin Guide to Jazz selected this album as part of its suggested Core Collection. In Jazzwise contributor Duncan Heining enthused: "What a monumental piece of music. George Russell, Mike Westbrook, Charles Mingus and Graham Collier – how many other jazz composers could produce something of such epic proportions where both composition and improvisation combine to such powerful effect? ... the composition continues to develop in the performance and becomes part of the improvisation and the improvisers create the writing anew every time they play. Expect raucously abstract playing, lyrical and melodic tune-led sections, driving rhythms, mighty cadenzas and brooding moments of transcendence. You won’t be disappointed". On All About Jazz Roger Farbey called it "an extraordinary masterpiece" and noted "The whole of Hoarded Dreams works so well because it doesn't manage to get bogged down by any one particular style or genre. It bounces from free or collective improvisation to carefully scored ensemble sections, creating a surprisingly satisfying effect because it exploits a classic characteristic of jazz: creating a mood of tension followed by release" while Nic Jones said "Hoarded Dreams just might be a touchstone for Graham Collier's music, more specifically the inventions for large ensembles that he's been fashioning for the last thirty-odd years". Exclaim! reviewer Nate Dorward commented "its an enormous pleasure to hear this music at last. Hoarded Dreams stylistic individuality and give-it-your-all energy make most recent big band albums sound prim and obsessively tidy by comparison".

== Track listing ==
All compositions by Graham Collier.

1. "Part 1" – 2:53
2. "Part 2" – 14:30
3. "Part 3" – 11:21
4. "Part 4" – 10:30
5. "Part 5" – 14:35
6. "Part 6" – 13:54
7. "Part 7" – 2:30

== Personnel ==
- Graham Collier – composer, director
- Geoff Warren – alto saxophone, alto flute
- Juhani Aaltonen – tenor saxophone, alto saxophone
- Art Themen – tenor saxophone, soprano saxophone
- Matthias Schubert – tenor saxophone, oboe
- John Surman – baritone saxophone, bass clarinet
- Ted Curson, Henry Lowther, Manfred Schoof, Tomasz Stańko, Kenny Wheeler – trumpet, flugelhorn
- Conny Bauer, Malcolm Griffiths, Eje Thelin – trombone
- Dave Powell – tuba
- John Schroder, Ed Speight – guitar
- Roger Dean – piano
- Paul Bridge – bass
- Ashley Brown – drums

== Documentary ==
In Britain, Channel 4 broadcast a television documentary on the performance (also called Hoarded Dreams) which was recorded in 1983 at the Bracknell Jazz Festival and broadcast on 6 March 1985. It featured an interview with Collier conducted by jazz critic Charles Fox, as well as parts of the concert.
