= Bread and Circuses (Graham Collier album) =

Live album by Graham Collier and the Collective
- Released: 2002
- Recorded: 12 September 2001; Perth, Australia
- Genre: Jazz
- Length: 51:13
- Label: Jazzprint; JPVP131CD
- Producer: Graham Collier

Graham Collier chronology
Winter Oranges (2000)	Bread and Circuses (2002)	Directing 14 Jackson Pollocks (2004)

Bread and Circuses is a live album by composer Graham Collier accompanied by the Collective featuring two suites performed in Australia and released on the Jazzprint label in 2002.

== Reception ==
Professional ratings
Review scores
Source	Rating
Allmusic	4/5 stars
The Penguin Guide to Jazz Recordings	3/4 stars

Allmusic said "Graham Collier has built a considerable legacy as a sophisticated composer of considerable depth, and this release builds on that foundation with further evidence of his extraordinary talents ... The Australian Collective acquits itself well, with powerful contributions from many players and tightly focused ensemble performances. For breadth of composition, strong improvisations, and complex, largely conventional writing with a slightly leftward tint, there is very little around that competes with Graham Collier at his best, and this album is among his finest".

== Track listing ==
All compositions by Graham Collier.

1. "Bread and Circuses: Introduction" - 2:53
2. "Bread and Circuses: Ballad One" - 2:28
3. "Bread and Circuses: Clapping" - 4:33
4. "Bread and Circuses: Pattern One" - 5:25
5. "Bread and Circuses: Interlude" - 1:54
6. "Bread and Circuses: Pattern Two" - 5:29
7. "Bread and Circuses: Ballad Two" - 3:10
8. "Bread and Circuses: Blues" - 5:51
9. "Bread and Circuses: Coda" - 3:02
10. "Oxford Palms: Picky Blues and Ballad One" - 3:14
11. "Oxford Palms: Open Blues and Ballad Two" - 6:01
12. "Oxford Palms: One Note Blues and Ballad Three" - 4:26
13. "Oxford Palms: Clapping Blues and Ballad Four" - 5:49

== Personnel ==
- Graham Collier – composer
- Adrian Kelly – trumpet
- Lucy Fisher – violin
- Stephanie Dean – violin
- Martin Payne – viola
- Jenny Tingley – cello
- Lindsay Vickery – soprano saxophone
- Graeme Blevins – alto saxophone
- Lee Buddle – baritone saxophone
- Jeremy Greig – trombone
- Kieran Hurley – trombone
- Matthew Savage – trombone, euphonium
- Phil Waldron – bass
- Grant Windsor – piano
- Tom O'Halloran – piano
- Steve Richter – percussion, marimba
- Hans Drieberg – drums, percussion
