= Henry Lowther (musician) =

English jazz trumpeter (born 1941)

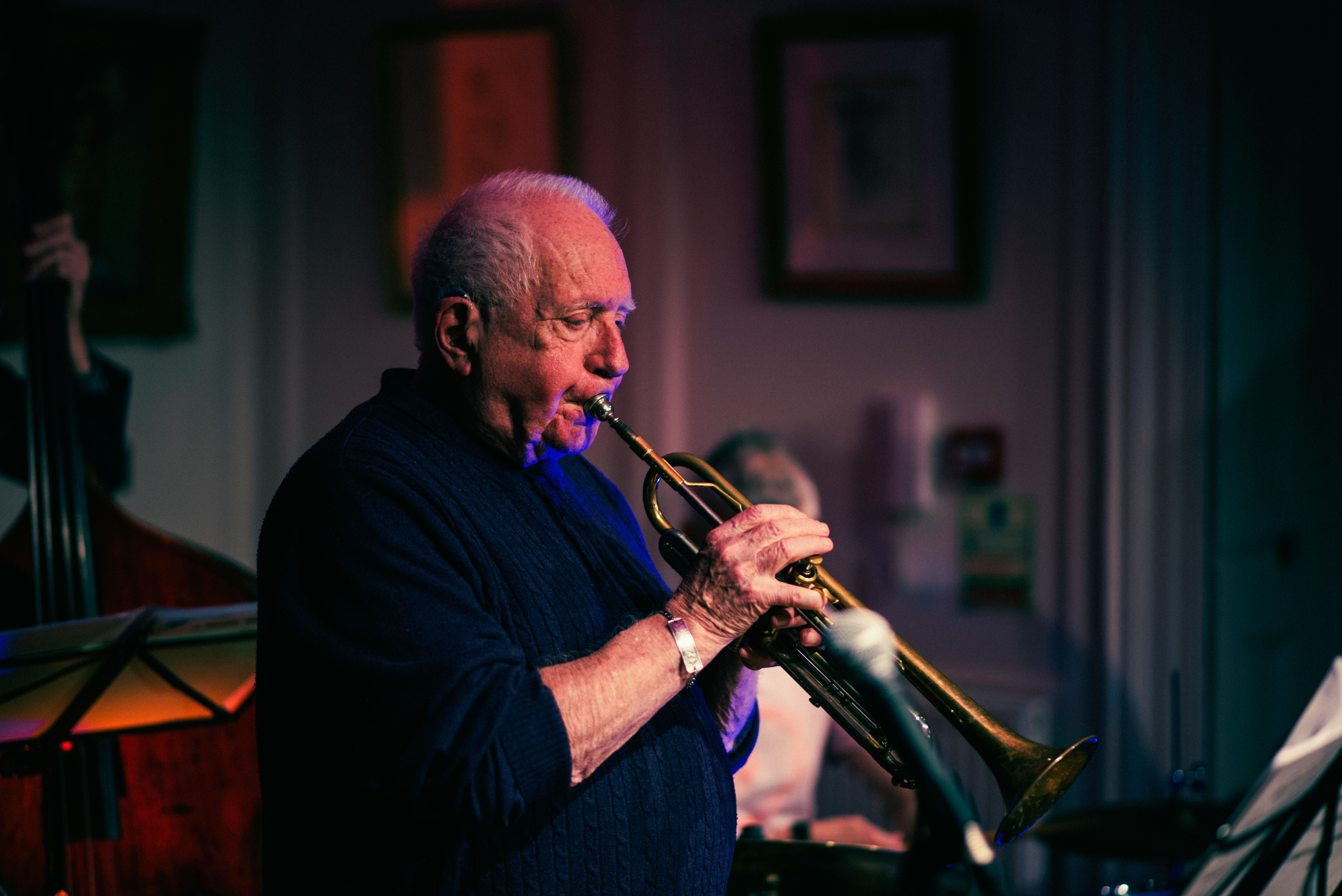
- Lowther in 2026

Background information
- Born: Thomas Henry Lowther; 11 July 1941 (age 85); Leicester, Leicestershire, England
- Genre: Jazz
- Occupation: Musician
- Instruments: Trumpet; violin; cornet
- Years active: 1950s–present
- Website: henrylowther.com

Thomas Henry Lowther (born 11 July 1941) is an English jazz trumpeter who also plays violin.

== Biography ==
Lowther was born in Leicester, England, and his first musical experience was on cornet in a Salvation Army band. He studied violin briefly at the Royal Academy of Music but returned to trumpet by 1960, though he sometimes played violin professionally. In the 1960s, he worked with Mike Westbrook (beginning in 1963 and continuing into the 1980s), Manfred Mann, John Dankworth (1967–77), Graham Collier (1967), John Mayall (1968), John Warren (1968 and subsequently), Neil Ardley (1968), and Bob Downes (1969). Many of these associations continued into the 1970s.

Lowther appeared for some time with the Keef Hartley Band, playing with him at Woodstock, the music festival held in New York in August 1969. In the 1970s he worked with Mike Gibbs (1970–76), Kenny Wheeler (from 1972), Alan Cohen (1972), Michael Garrick (1972–73), Kurt Edelhagen (1974), John Taylor (1974), Stan Tracey (1976 onwards), Tony Coe (1976), Graham Collier (1976–78), Jubiaba with Barbara Thompson (1978) and Gordon Beck (1978), in addition to his own ensemble, Quaternity. Lowther played the trumpet solo for Elton John on "Return to Paradise" for John's 1978 album, A Single Man.

He worked with Buzzcocks in 1980, Talk Talk from 1983 to 1991, with Peter King from 1983, and with Gil Evans in 1984. He was featured in a profile on composer Graham Collier in the 1985 Channel 4 documentary Hoarded Dreams. In 1986 he worked with Humphrey Lyttelton in his reconstruction of the John Robichaux Orchestra for a documentary film on Buddy Bolden. He played with Charlie Watts's band in 1986–87, then led his own band, Still Waters, in 1987. From the late 1980s he did much work in big bands, such as the Berlin Contemporary Jazz Orchestra (1989–93), the London Jazz Composers Orchestra (1989–96), Kenny Wheeler's group (1990), The Dedication Orchestra (1994), the London Jazz Orchestra (1994), George Russell's Living Time Orchestra, the Creative Jazz Orchestra (1996) and Jazzmoss.

== Discography ==
As leader

- Child Song (Deram, ca.1970)
- I.D. (Henry Lowther's Still Waters: Village Life, 1996)
- Fungii Mama (Henry Lowther - Jim Mullen Quartet, GWB, 2002)
- Can't Believe, Won't Believe (Henry Lowther's Still Waters: Village Life, ca.2018)

With Neil Ardley

- A Symphony of Amaranths (Regal Zonophone, 1972)
- Camden '70 (Dusk Fire, 2008)
- Mike Taylor Remembered (Trunk, 2007)
- On the Radio : BBC Sessions 1971 (Dusk Fire, 2017)

With Jack Bruce

- Songs for a Tailor (Polydor, 1969)
- At His Best (Polydor, 1972)
- Cities of the Heart (CMP, 1994)
- Rockpalast: the 50th Birthday Concerts (MIG, 2014)

With Graham Collier

- New Conditions (Mosaic, 1976)
- Symphony of Scorpions (Mosaic, 1977)
- The Day of the Dead (Mosaic, 1978)
- Charles River Fragments (Boathouse, 1996)
- Workpoints (Cuneiform, 2005)
- Hoarded Dreams (Cuneiform, 2007)

With John Dankworth

- The $1,000,000 Collection (Fontana, 1967)
- Full Circle (Philips, 1972)
- Lifeline (Philips, 1973)

With David Essex

- Hot Love (Mercury, 1980)
- Silver Dream Racer (Mercury, 1980)
- Stage Struck (Metronome, 1982)
- The Whisper (Mercury, 1983)
- This One's for You (Mercury, 1984)

With Michael Gibbs

- Directs the Only Chrome-Waterfall Orchestra (Bronze, 1975)
- Just Ahead (Polydor, 1972)
- Michael Gibbs (Deram, 1970)
- Tanglewood 63 (Deram, 1971)
- Festival 69 (Turtle, 2018)

With Barry Guy and the London Jazz Composers Orchestra

- Zurich Concerts (Intakt, 1988)
- Harmos (Intakt, 1989)
- Double Trouble (Intakt, 1990)
- Theoria (Intakt, 1992)
- Portraits (Intakt, 1994)
- Three Pieces for Orchestra (Intakt, 1997)
- Double Trouble Two (Intakt, 1998)
- Study II/Stringer (Intakt, 2005)
- Radio Rondo/Schaffhausen Concert (Intakt, 2009)

With Keef Hartley

- Halfbreed (Deram, 1969)
- The Battle of North West Six (Deram, 1969)
- The Time Is Near (Deram, 1970)
- British Radio Sessions 1969–1971 (On the Air, 2013)

With John Mayall

- Bare Wires (Decca, 1968)
- Primal Solos (London, 1977)
- Rare Tracks Vol. 2 (Decca, 1981)
- London Blues 1964–1969 (Deram, 1992)
- 70th Birthday Concert (Eagle, 2003)

With Talk Talk

- It's My Life (EMI, 1984)
- Spirit of Eden (Parlophone, 1988)
- Laughing Stock (Verve, 1991)

With Colin Towns

- Mask Orchestra (Jazz Label, 1993)
- Nowhere & Heaven (Provocateur, 1996)
- Bolt From the Blue (Provocateur, 1997)
- Dreaming Man with Blue Suede Shoes (Provocateur, 1999)
- Another Think Coming (Provocateur, 2001)
- The Orpheus Suite (Provocateur, 2004)

With Stan Tracey

- Genesis (STEAM, 1987)
- We Still Love You Madly (Mole, 1989)
- Live at the QEH (Blue Note, 1994)
- The Durham Connection (33 Records, 1999)

With Mike Westbrook

- Marching Song Vol. 1 (Deram, 1969)
- Marching Song Vol. 2 (Deram, 1969)
- Marching Song: An Anti-War Jazz Symphony (Deram, London 1970)
- Metropolis (RCA/Neon, 1971)
- Citadel/Room 315 (RCA 1975)
- Love/Dream and Variations (Transatlantic, 1976)
- The Westbrook Blake (Bright As Fire) (Original, 1980)

With Kenny Wheeler

- Windmill Tilter (Fontana, 1969)
- Music for Large & Small Ensembles (ECM, 1990)
- A Long Time Ago (ECM, 1999)
- The Long Waiting (CAM Jazz, 2012)

With others

- Barry Adamson, Black Amour (Mute, 2002)
- Mike de Albuquerque, We May Be Cattle But We've All Got Names (RCA Victor, 1973)
- Jon Anderson, Animation (Polydor, 1982)
- Julian Argüelles, As Above So Below (Provocateur, 2003)
- Steve Ashley, Stroll On (Line, 1989)
- Berlin Contemporary Jazz Orchestra, Berlin Contemporary Jazz Orchestra (ECM, 1990)
- Berlin Contemporary Jazz Orchestra, Live in Japan '96 (DIW, 1997)
- Chris Biscoe, Profiles of Mingus (Trio, 2010)
- Marc Brierley, Welcome to the Citadel (Cherry Tree, 2014)
- Brilliant, Kiss the Lips of Life (WEA, 1986)
- Pete Brown, The Not Forgotten Association (Deram, 1973)
- Buzzcocks, Strange Thing (United Artists, 1980)
- Caravan, For Girls Who Grow Plump in the Night (Deram, 1973)
- CCS, C.C.S. (RAK, 1970)
- CCS, C.C.S. 2 (RAK, 1970)
- Cerrone, Cerrone IV the Golden Touch (Malligator, 1978)
- Keith Christmas, Brighter Day (Manticore, 1974)
- Philip Clemo, The Rooms (All Colours Arts, 2008)
- Tony Coe, Zeitgeist Based On Poems of Jill Robin (EMI, 1977)
- Colosseum, Those Who Are About to Die Salute You (Fontana, 1969)
- Lol Coxhill, More Together Than Alone (Emanem, 2007)
- David Coverdale, Northwinds (Polydor, 1978)
- Curved Air, Airborne (RCA Victor, 1976)
- Delegation, Deuces High (Ariola, 1982)
- Lynsey de Paul, Surprise (MAM, 1973)
- Bob Downes, Open Music (Philips, 1970)
- Bob Downes, Hells Angels (Openian, 1975)
- Bill Drummond, The Man (MNW, 1986)
- Egg, The Polite Force (Deram, 1971)
- Elf, Carolina County Ball (Purple, 1974)
- Gil Evans, The British Orchestra (Mole, 1983)
- Gil Evans, Take Me to the Sun (Last Chance Music, 1990)
- Neca Falk, Najja Ostaju (RTV Ljubljana, 1980)
- Georgie Fame, Right Now! (Pye, 1979)
- Bryan Ferry, These Foolish Things (Island, 1973)
- Bryan Ferry, Another Time, Another Place (Island, 1974)
- Paul Field, Restless Heart (Myrrh, 1983)
- Martyn Ford, Smoovin (Vertigo, 1976)
- Sharon Forrester, Sharon (Vulcan, 1975)
- Allan Ganley, June Time (Vocalion, 2009)
- Michael Garrick, Home Stretch Blues (Argo, 1972)
- Michael Garrick, Troppo (Argo, 1974)
- Dana Gillespie, Ain't Gonna Play No Second Fiddle (RCA Victor, 1974)
- Gordon Giltrap, Visionary (Electric Record Company, 1976)
- Gordon Giltrap, Perilous Journey (Electric Record Company, 1977)
- Carol Grimes, Warm Blood (Caroline, 1974)
- John Gustafson, Goose Grease (Angel Air, 1997)
- John Harle, The Shadow of the Duke (EMI, 1992)
- Hawklords, 25 Years On (Charisma, 1978)
- Murray Head, Nigel Lived (CBS, 1972)
- The Hollies, Russian Roulette (Polydor, 1976)
- Glenn Hughes, Play Me Out (Safari, 1977)
- Neil Innes, The Innes Book of Records (Polydor, 1979)
- Neil Innes, Off the Record (MMC, 1982)
- Incognito, Tomorrow's New Dream (Space Shower Music, 2019)
- Chaz Jankel, Chasanova (A&M, 1981)
- Elton John, A Single Man (Rocket, 1978)
- Denis King, Rainbow Room (Frituna, 1986)
- Hans Koller, New Memories (33 Records, 2002)
- Locomotive, We Are Everything You See (Parlophone, 1970)
- Don Lusher, Cavatina (Chandos, 1980)
- Humphrey Lyttelton, Gonna Call My Children Home/the World of Buddy Bolden (Calligraph, 1986)
- Malcolm and Alwyn, Wildwall (Key, 1974)
- Manfred Mann, Radio Days Vol. 1: Live at the BBC 64–66 (Creature Music, 2019)
- John Mayer, Dhammapada (Vocalion, 2006)
- Jackie McAuley, Jackie McAuley (Philips, 1971)
- Memphis Slim, Blue Memphis (Warner Bros., 1970)
- Louis Moholo, For the Blue Notes (Ogun, 2014)
- New Jazz Orchestra, Le Dejeuner Sur L'Herbe (Verve, 1969)
- João Pedro Pais, Tudo Bem Edicoes Valentim de Carvalho (2004)
- Shawn Phillips, Faces (A&M, 1972)
- The Pretenders, Pretenders II (Sire, 1981)
- Quantum Jump, Barracuda (Voiceprint, 1998)
- Sam Rivers, Tony Hymas, Eight Day Journal (Nato, 1998)
- The Sadista Sisters, the Sadista Sisters (Transatlantic, 1976)
- Bill Sharpe, Famous People (Polydor, 1985)
- Gary Shearston, The Greatest Stone On Earth and Other Two-Bob Wonders (Charisma, 1975)
- Slapp Happy, Slapp Happy (Virgin, 1974)
- Spirogyra, Bells, Boots and Shambles (Brain/Metronome 1973)
- Stan Sulzmann, Birthdays Birthdays (Village Life, 1999)
- John Surman, The Brass Project (ECM, 1993)
- These New Puritans, Field of Reeds (Infectious Music, 2013)
- Evelyn Thomas, I Wanna Make It On My Own (Casablanca, 1978)
- Evelyn Thomas, Have a Little Faith in Me (AVI, 1979)
- Barbara Thompson, Barbara Thompson's Jubiaba (MCA, 1978)
- Richard Thompson & Linda Thompson, Pour Down Like Silver (Island, 1975)
- Keith Tippett, Frames (Ogun, 1978)
- Lee Towers, You and Me (Ariola, 1985)
- Jasper van 't Hof, George Gruntz, Fairytale (MPS, 1979)
- Van Morrison, Avalon Sunset (Polydor, 1989)
- Van Morrison Enlightenment (Polydor, 1990)
- Alexander von Schlippenbach/Berlin Contemporary Jazz Orchestra, The Morlocks and Other Pieces (FMP, 1994)
- Loudon Wainwright III, I'm Alright (Rounder, 1985)
- Charlie Watts, Watts at Scott's (Black Box/Sanctuary, 2004)
- Don Weller, Live (33 Records, 1997)
- Alan White, Ramshackled (Atlantic, 1976)
- Norma Winstone, Edge of Time (Argo, 1972)
- Wynder K. Frog, Out of the Frying Pan (Island, 1968)
- Momoe Yamaguchi, Golden Flight (CBS/Sony, 1977)
- Michael Zager, Life's a Party (Private Stock, 1979)
