= Hazel Smith (writer) =

British-Australian poet and intermedia writer

- Born: 1950; Leeds
- Occupations: Professor emerita, poet
- Writing career
- Genres: Electronic literature, Poetry
- Awards: Fellow of the Royal Society of New South Wales

Academic work
- Institutions: Western Sydney University

Hazel Smith is an experimental and performance poet and electronic literature writer, a multimedia artist, musician and academic. In addition to her artistic career, she is known for her scholarship on poet Frank O'Hara, on practice-led research and research-led practice in the creative arts, and on literature-music relationships. She has published nine poetry collections, over 40 sound and multimedia works and five academic books. She is an Emeritus Professor in the Writing and Society Research Centre at Western Sydney University, and an elected Fellow of the Royal Society of New South Wales. Before becoming a poet and academic, she was a violinist and a member of the experimental music groups LYSIS and austraLYSIS.

== Education and career ==
Smith was born in Leeds in the United Kingdom in 1950. Smith's mother, Eta Cohen, was a violin teacher. and Smith followed in her footsteps as a violinist and violin teacher in the 1970s and early 1980s. In London she was a member of the experimental music group LYSIS where she played violin, sometimes using a ring modulator to electronically alter the sound. After completing a PhD in American literature, Smith moved to Australia, where LYSIS was renamed austraLYSIS. Smith started writing experimental poetry and became a contributor in Australia to sound poetry and poetry/music collaborations. Subsequently, she became active in electronic literature and multimedia work.

After she completed her PhD on Frank O'Hara in 1988, Smith spent 28 years in academia (at the Universities of New South Wales, Canberra and Western Sydney). After retiring in 2017 she has been an Emeritus Professor in the Writing and Society Research Centre, Western Sydney University.

In 2025 she was elected a Fellow of the Royal Society of New South Wales.

== Works ==
=== Early musical career ===
Before becoming a poet and academic, Smith was a violinist, leading and recording with the chamber ensembles LYSIS and Sonant, becoming a member of the Philharmonia Orchestra, and working with notable classical and new music ensembles such as the London Sinfonietta.

=== Poetry ===
Smith's early poetry in the 80s and 90s was centered on formal and linguistic experimentation which was aligned with British "linguistically innovative poetry" and American 'language poetry' as well as other modernist, postmodernist and lyric poetry traditions. This emphasis on formal experimentation has continued into in her later work but is accompanied by a stronger emphasis on social, political and psychological themes. In her review of Smith's Abstractly Represented, Joy Wallace explains that Hazel Smith's poetry uses "text sounds" to interact with technology. Chris Arnold terms her work "relentlessly experimental."

Smith's poetry volumes (some listed below) have received academic and critical attention. Broad discussion of her work has appeared in many books and journals. Major critical review books refer to her 'consistently experimental work' in poetry.

Her books of poetry include:

- Abstractly Represented (1991). In this volume of 'poems and performance texts 1982-90' Smith reveals "an analytic awareness of the main revolutions in twentieth-century cultural—and specifically linguistic—thinking", and "far from Kristeva's idea that music is prelinguistic the poems suggest that music and language have the potential constantly to reform each other.".
- Keys Round Her Tongue (2000). This collection comprises short prose, poems, performance texts and experiments with language. It includes the text of Secret Places with an image of Casuarina Woman (a woman made of casuarina needles) by Sieglinde Karl-Spence, a regular collaborator.
- The Erotics of Geography (2008). This work includes audio and audio visual pieces (on an attached CD) "to turn this moonlit map upside down."
- Word Migrants (2016). This poetry uses "mix-up" texts of quotes and phrases from the internet. Joy Wallace further notes that Smith's fourth volume of poetry is divided into thematic sections that cover Jewish history, ethical art, language, and loss and grief. Ann Vickery analyzes poems in this work in the context of dementia, which considers connections between fluency and language difficulties. Andy Jackson closely reads another poem in this collection, "The Poetics of Discomfort" to examine how disabilities and difficulties with language intersect.
- Ecliptical (Spineless Wonders, 2022) This work covers poetry creation, social and political concerns, human connections, identities and cultural differences, the female body, and time and perspective. Wallace characterizes the project's aims "to propel earthly dwellers on paths we cannot immediately discern but must help to carve out.
- Heimlich Unheimlich: A poetry and art collaboration with Sieglinde Karl-Spence (2024). This work interweaves women's stories, which are named after different types of cloth (Muslin and Hessian).

=== Performance poetry, multimedia work and electronic literature ===
Smith was also active in Australia in sound and performance poetry, as represented in her earlier volumes, and on her CDs and CD-Rom (see below). Subsequently, in multimedia and electronic literature, she has published and exhibited numerous collaborative works, involving her text and text performance alongside image and sound and has been described as "a foremost electronic poet". She has performed and broadcast her work in Europe, Asia, North America and Australasia and is a founding member of the sound and multimedia creative ensemble austraLYSIS. Most recently her performance piece of text and sound, Unbalancing was released on CD by them. There are several academic studies on her multimedia works.

Her electronic literature works include:

- Wordstuffs (1998, with Roger Dean and Greg White) is an early example of multiplicity of sound, image and text, to a competitive commission from the Australian Film Commission. Given the period, a requirement of this piece was that it fit entirely on a single 1.4Mb floppy disc. It was displayed for 20 years on the web site of the Australian Broadcasting Commission (see the Wayback Machine, where it is no longer functional) but video traversals are available.
- Mid-Air Conversations (2007) is a moving and spatial algorithmic speech piece (a generative piece) from MAX/MSP patches that move between fragments of text.
- Motions (2014) with Will Luers (image) and Roger Dean (sound) focuses on human trafficking. It was first published in Electronic Literature Organization's (ELO) Electronic Literature Collection 3 and then curated in The NEXT Museum, Library, and Preservation Space. The work uses HTML5 and jQuery to assemble images, video, and text to create a soundscape.
- novelling (2020) with Will Luers (image) and Roger Dean (sound) remixes novels as a generative work, using text, video, and sound was first published in Electronic Literature Organization's (ELO) Electronic Literature Collection 4. Alessandra Di Tella contrasts this work with Tristano, a hyper-novel by Nanni Balestrini. Fragments of text, video, and sound are presented in 6 minute cycles, with a change in interface every 30 seconds or at the reader's choice. This work was shown in libraries in Norway, Denmark, and Romania.
- Dolphins in the Reservoir, also by Luers, Smith, and Dean (2022).
- Inner Differencing: Alexander von Humboldt's thousand threads (2025-6), has text by Smith, and image, animation, sound and coding by Dean. It addresses inner differences in the earth, its flora and fauna, and in people, minds and societies, with strong reference to the ideas of Alexander von Humboldt. It uses a cyclic and rhizomatic progression, and both a traversal and a link to the piece itself are at.

=== Academic research ===
Smith's academic research has focused on the areas of experimental writing, contemporary poetry, relationships between literature and music, electronic literature and creative writing process and pedagogy. Sarah Law explains that Hazel Smith's academic criticism informs her poetry. She has contributed five major academic books, and numerous research articles. For example, she co-edited Practice-led Research, Research-led Practice in the Creative Arts which has >1650 citations. Her volume The Writing Experiment: strategies for innovative creative writing, was designed for higher education creative writing courses andis used internationally. Many of her academic publications are in her Google Scholar profile. She is also a co-editor of the creative arts journal of online sound, text and image, soundsRite and created its antecedent, Inflect, archived at the soundsRite site.

== Awards ==
The Australian Broadcasting Corporation nominated her text and sound piece Poet Without Language to represent Australia for the Prix Italia Prize in 1992. The piece was released on an eponymous CD (Rufus RF005/Soma 785, 1994)

In 2005, The Writing Experiment: strategies for innovative creative writing was shortlisted for the peer-reviewed Australian Publishing Association Awards for Excellence in Educational Publishing in the tertiary single-title category.

novelling was shortlisted for the international Turn on Literature Prize in 2017.

In 2018, together with Luers and Dean, she was awarded first place in ELO's international Robert Coover prize for their collaboration, novelling.

In 2022, another collaboration with Luers and Dean, Dolphins in the Reservoir, was shortlisted for the international New Media Writing Prize run by Bournemouth University, UK.

== Bibliography ==
=== Academic Books ===
- Smith, Hazel and Dean, Roger T. 1997. ‘’Improvisation, Hypermedia and the Arts Since 1945’’, London and New York, Harwood Academic (now available from Routledge). (334 pages).
- Smith, Hazel. 2000. ‘’Hyperscapes in the Poetry of Frank O'Hara: difference, homosexuality, topography’’, Liverpool, Liverpool University Press. (230 pages).
- Smith, Hazel. 2005. ‘’The Writing Experiment: strategies for innovative creative writing’’, Allen and Unwin, Sydney (288 pages).
- Smith, Hazel and Dean, Roger T. 2009. (eds.) ‘’Practice-led Research, Research-led Practice in the Creative Arts’’, Edinburgh: Edinburgh University Press, 278 pages.
- Smith, Hazel. 2016. ‘’The Contemporary Literature-Music Relationship: intermedia, voice, technology, cross-cultural exchange’’, New York and London, Routledge (202 pages).

== Discography ==
- Smith, Hazel. 1994. ‘’Poet Without Language,’’ CD, Sydney, Rufus Records, RF005.
- Smith, Hazel. 1994. “Simultaneity”, ‘’Windows in Time’’, CD, Tall Poppies, TP039, Sydney.
- Smith, Hazel and Dean, Roger. 1996. ‘’Nuraghic Echoes’’, CD, Rufus Records, RF025.
- Dean, Roger and Smith, Hazel. 1997. ‘’Lowering The Sky’’, sound recording on CD, Andrew Levy and Bob Harrison, (eds.) ‘’Crayon: Festschrift for Jackson Mac Low’’, New York, Crayon. Also released on ‘’Acouslytic’’, (2000), Tall Poppies Records, TP153, Sydney.
- Smith, Hazel and Roger Dean. 1998. ‘’Walking The Faultlines’’, on ‘’Cyberquilt: an ICMA CD—Rom Anthology’’, San Francisco, International Computer Association.
- Dean, Roger and Smith, Hazel and austraLYSIS (2000) ‘’Acouslytic’’, Tall Poppies TP 153. Includes five works of collaboration between Smith (text) and Dean (sound), alongside other electroacoustic music.
- Smith, Hazel and Roger Dean, 2001. ‘’Returning the Angles’’, Soma CD-ROM 787, Soma Publishing, Sydney.
- Smith, Hazel and Dean, Roger (2000). CD included in Keys Round Her Tongue, Tinfish Books.
- Smith, Hazel and Roger Dean, 2008, ‘’Ubasteyama’’ on ‘’Music of the Spirits’’, curated by Michael Atherton and Bruce Crossman, Wirripang CD, Wirr 011.
- Smith, Hazel and austraLYSIS, (2024), ‘’Unbalancing” on ‘’Dualling”, Earshift CD 085.
