= Michael Gibbs (composer) =

English jazz trombonist and keyboardist (born 1937)

Mike Gibbs
- Born: Michael Clement Irving Gibbs; 25 September 1937 (age 89); Harare, Southern Rhodesia (now Zimbabwe)
- Genre: Jazz
- Occupations: Musician; bandleader; composer; arranger; producer
- Instruments: Keyboards; trombone
- Years active: 1960s–present

Michael Clement Irving Gibbs (born 25 September 1937) is a Rhodesian-born English jazz composer, arranger and bandleader, as well as a trombonist and keyboardist.

He is known for collaborations with vibraphonist Gary Burton (his student), and for his use of rock elements in orchestral jazz.

== Career ==
Gibbs was born in Harare, Southern Rhodesia (now Zimbabwe). He moved to Boston, Massachusetts, United States in 1959, in order to study at the Berklee College of Music and Boston Conservatory. In 1961, Gibbs took scholarships at the Lennox School of Jazz and later at Tanglewood Music Center, where his teachers included Aaron Copland and Gunther Schuller. Initially returning to Rhodesia, Gibbs settled in England in 1965. It was in this period he began to work regularly with Gary Burton. Perhaps his best known composition, 'Sweet Rain', can be heard on Burton's album Duster (1967), and is the title track of the Stan Getz album Sweet Rain (1967).

Recording as a trombonist with Graham Collier, John Dankworth, Kenny Wheeler and Mike Westbrook in the late 1960s, Gibbs began establishing himself as a composer and arranger. He released his first album, Michael Gibbs, in 1970. During this period he also composed and arranged the music for two ballets for Ballet Rambert, both choreographed by Graham Jones: Totems (1972) and Cantate (1973). Gibbs also wrote and arranged music for radio, television and film, including (from 1970 to 1974),as musical director for the BBC TV comedy programme The Goodies.

His third album, Just Ahead (Polydor 2683, 1972), was recorded over four consecutive nights at Ronnie Scotts and features many of the top british jazz players of the time: Kenny Wheeler, Henry Lowther, Harry Beckett, Ray Warleigh, Alan Skidmore, John Taylor, Chris Spedding, John Marshall and Frank Ricotti. With compositions from Carla Bley, Gary Burton and Keith Tippett as well as Gibbs himself, it highlights Gibbs as an inventive arranger in the tradition of Duke Ellington and Gil Evans. His wide-ranging collaborations with Burton during this period were well received: Seven Songs for Quartet and Chamber Orchestra (ECM 1040, 1973) shows off his classical chamber music influences (from Baroque to Charles Ives and Olivier Messiaen), while In the Public Interest (Polydor PD 6503, 1974) moves closer to jazz-rock fusion with its large 21-piece ensemble and electric rhythm section. That year Gibbs moved to the USA as composer in residence at Berklee, though he continued to tour in Britain (1975-8) and compose music for radio orchestras in Finland, Sweden and Germany (1979-81).

After resigning from his Berklee teaching position in 1983, Gibbs became a freelance arranger and producer, moving back to London in 1985 and working variously with Jaco Pastorius, Michael Mantler, Joni Mitchell, Pat Metheny, John McLaughlin, Whitney Houston, Vladislav Sendecki, Peter Gabriel and Sister Sledge. In 1991, he toured and recorded with John Scofield. In 1994 he composed Europeana Jazzphony No.1, based around 13 European folk songs. It was recorded by the Hannover Radio Philharmonic Orchestra, with Joachim Kühn as piano soloist and Django Bates (tenor horn), Albert Mangelsdorff (trombone) and Markus Stockhausen (trumpet/flugelhorn) among the other soloists.

During the years 1999–2000, he worked at the Sibelius Academy Jazz Department in Helsinki where he had a professorship (part-time) in jazz composition and arranging. Since 2000 he has continued his collaborations with Germany's NDR Big Band, celebrated his 70th birthday in 2007 at a concert in Birmingham featuring Bill Frisell, Steve Swallow and Adam Nussbaum, and recorded an album of music associated with Gil Evans, adapting Evans' own arangements for the 12 piece band. His 80th birthday in 2017 was celebrated with big band concerts in Scarborough, London and Birmingham.

On 2 October 2017, Gibbs was presented with a BASCA Gold Badge Award, in recognition of his unique contribution to music. In 2017, Gibbs was awarded an honorary doctorate of music from his alma mater, Berklee College of Music.

== Discography ==
=== As leader ===
- Michael Gibbs (Deram, 1970)
- Tanglewood 63 (Deram, 1971)
- Just Ahead (Polydor, 1972)
- In the Public Interest, with Gary Burton (Polydor, 1974)
- Seven Songs for Quartet and Chamber Orchestra (1974, ECM)
- Directs the Only Chrome Waterfall Orchestra (Bronze, 1975)
- Will Power with Neil Ardley, Ian Carr, Stan Tracey (Argo, 1975)
- Big Music with Bob Moses, Chris Hunter, Lew Soloff, Dave Bargeron, etc. (Venture, 1988, re-issued with additional track, ACT, 1996)
- By The Way (Ah UM, 1993)
- Europeana: Jazzphony No. 1 with Joachim Kuhn (ACT, 1995)
- Nonsequence (Provocateur, 2001)
- Here's a Song for You with the NDR Big Band, Norma Winstone (Fuzzy Moon, 2011)
- Back in the Days with the NDR Big Band (Cuneiform, 2012)
- Mike Gibbs + 12 Play Gil Evans (Whirlwind, 2013)
- In My View with the NDR Big Band (Cuneiform, 2015)
- Play a Bill Frisell Set List with the NDR Big Band (Cuneiform, 2015)
- Festival 69 with Gary Burton (Turtle, 2018)
- Mike Gibbs Band, Symphony Hall Birmingham 1991 - feat. John Scofield Trio, (DuskFire Co.Uk, 2018)

=== As sideman ===
- Graham Collier, Deep Dark Blue Centre (Deram, 1967)
- Kenny Wheeler, Windmill Tilter (Fontana, 1969)
- Barry Guy/The London Jazz Composers' Orchestra, Ode (Incus, 1972)
- Michael Mantler, Something There (WATT/ECM, 1983)
- Nguyen Le, NDR Big Band, Celebrating the Dark Side of the Moon (ACT, 2014)
- Eberhard Weber, Pat Metheny, et al., Hommage à Eberhard Weber (ECM, 2015)

=== As producer ===
- Kevin Eubanks, Young Lions, in concert at Carnegie Hall (Elektra Musician, 1983)

=== Film scores ===
- Secrets (1971)
- Madame Sin (1972)
- Intimate Reflections (1975)
- Housekeeping (Varèse Sarabande, 1987)
- Close My Eyes (1991)
- Iron & Silk (The Fine Line, 1991)
- Century (1993)
- Hard Boiled (The Fine Line, 1993)
- Being Human (Varèse Sarabande, 1994)
- Century/Close My Eyes (The Fine Line, 1994)
