= Songs for My Father =

Studio album by Graham Collier Music
- Released: 1970
- Recorded: 1970; London, England
- Genre: Jazz
- Length: 48:02
- Labels: Fontana; 6309 006
- Producer: Terry Brown

Graham Collier chronology
Down Another Road (1969)	Songs for My Father (1970)	Mosaics (1970)

Songs for My Father is an album by composer/bassist Graham Collier recorded in 1970 and originally released on the British Fontana label.

== Reception ==
Professional ratings
Review scores
Source	Rating
Allmusic	4/5 stars
All About Jazz	5/5 stars

Allmusic said "Songs for My Father is the first evidence listeners have of the maturing Collier, moving jazz aesthetics around in order to more fully articulate his sophisticated palette". On All About Jazz Nic Jones noted "it's the one that offers the greatest insight into Collier's more recent methodology, not least because the numbers of musicians involved are more indicative of his later work with larger ensembles".

== Track listing ==
All compositions by Graham Collier.

1. "Song One (Seven-Four)" – 9:34
2. "Song Two (Ballad)" – 5:38
3. "Song Three (Nine-Eight Blues)" – 7:52
4. "Song Four (Waltz in Four-Four)" – 7:42
5. "Song Five (Rubato)" – 4:43
6. "Song Six (Dirge)" – 3:37
7. "Song Seven (Four-Four Figured)" – 9:13

== Personnel ==
- Graham Collier – bass
- Harry Beckett – trumpet, flugelhorn
- Alan Wakeman – soprano saxophone, tenor saxophone
- Bob Sydor – alto saxophone, tenor saxophone
- John Taylor – piano
- John Webb – drums
- Derek Wadsworth – trombone (tracks 1–3 & 7)
- Alan Skidmore, Tony Roberts – tenor saxophone (tracks 1, 5 & 7)
- Phil Lee – guitar (tracks 1 & 7)
