= Steve Waterman (musician) =

British musician (born 1960)

Steve Waterman (born 8 September 1960) is a British jazz trumpeter, composer and educator.

Waterman was born in Lincolnshire and educated at Trinity College. He leads a quintet and 18-piece jazz orchestra, holds several teaching posts and has co-authored a book on jazz trumpet method.
