= Art Themen =

British jazz saxophonist and surgeon (born 1939)

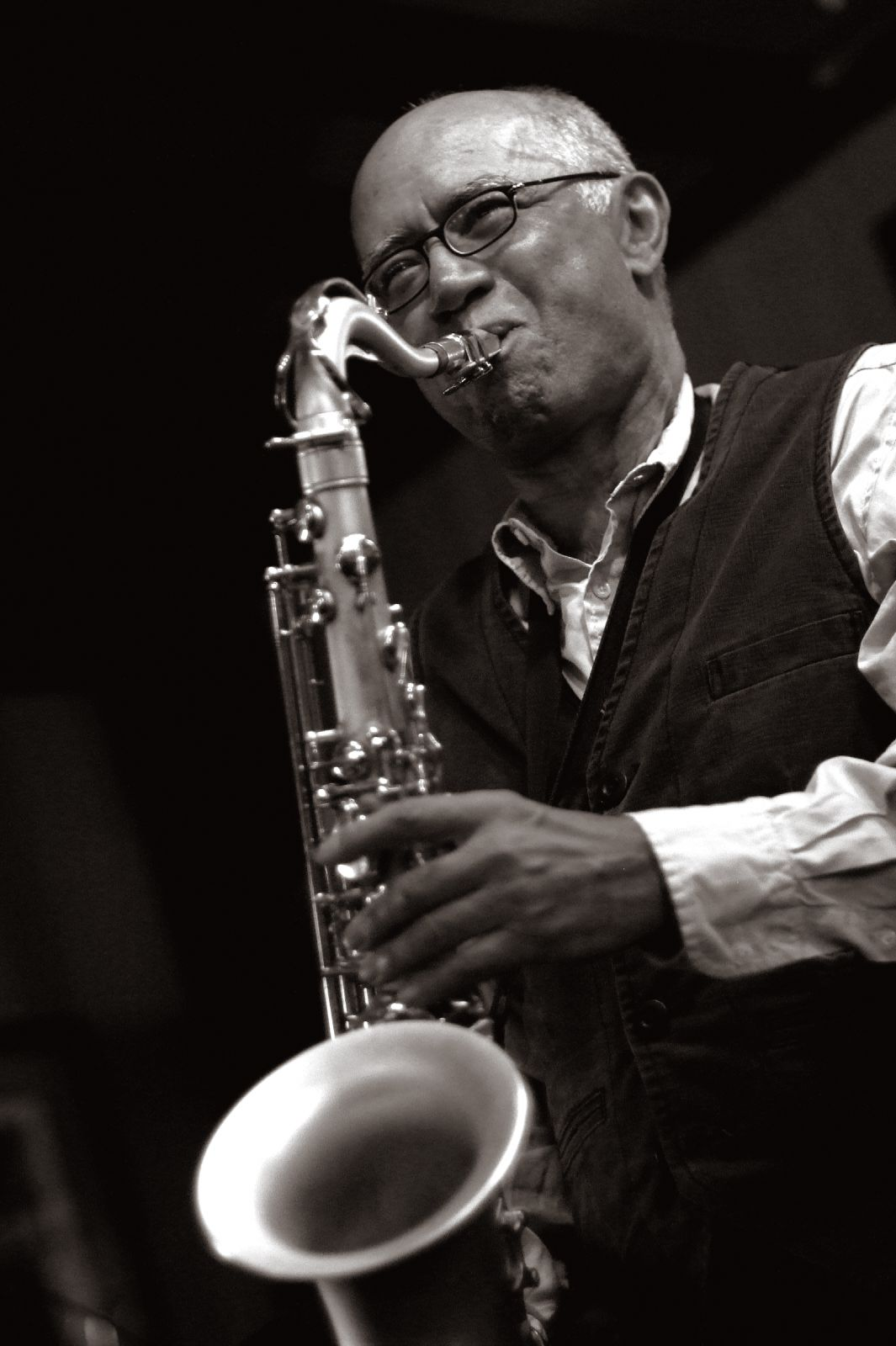
- Themen performing in 2009

Background information
- Born: Arthur Edward George Themen; 26 November 1939 (age 86); Manchester, England
- Education: St Catharine's College, Cambridge
- Genre: Jazz
- Occupations: Musician, orthopaedic surgeon
- Instrument: Saxophone

Arthur Edward George Themen (born 26 November 1939) is a British jazz saxophonist and formerly orthopaedic surgeon. Critic John Fordham has described him as "an appealing presence on the British jazz circuit for over 40 years.... Originally a Dexter Gordon and Sonny Rollins disciple ... Themen has proved himself remarkably attentive to the saxophone styles of subsequent generations."

== Life and career ==
Themen was born in Manchester, England, where he was involved with the traditional jazz scene in the late 1950s as a self-taught musician, having started playing clarinet as a schoolboy at Manchester Grammar School.

In 1958, Themen matriculated at St Catharine's College, Cambridge, where he studied the natural sciences tripos. There, he started playing jazz with the Cambridge University Jazz Band – with bandmates including Lionel Grigson, Dave Gelly, George Walden, Jonathan Lynn and John Hart – the group under pianist Grigson's leadership achieving "near professional standard with a swinging hard-bop style that swept the board in the fiercely contested Inter-University Jazz Band Competitions".

In 1961, Themen went to complete his studies at St Mary's Hospital Medical School, Paddington, where he qualified in 1964; specialising in orthopaedic medicine, he eventually became a consultant. In London, he played with blues musicians Jack Bruce and Alexis Korner, and was a member of Alexis Korner's Blues Incorporated. Themen has said: "I had pretty much decided that I could continue to practise medicine and play saxophone, and Alexis, being heavily into blues as well as taking in jazz influences like Charles Mingus, furthered my knowledge of music quite a lot." In 1965, Themen played with the Peter Stuyvesant Jazz Orchestra in Zürich, going on to play with such English luminaries as Michael Garrick, Ian Carr, and Graham Collier's Music.

In 1974, Themen entered on what was to be one of his central musical relationships when he started playing with Stan Tracey, and he has played with all of Tracey's groups, touring with him all over the world as well as around the UK. Themen has also played and toured with visiting US musicians, including Charlie Rouse, Nat Adderley, Red Rodney, George Coleman, and Al Haig.

He was featured in a profile on composer Graham Collier in the 1985 Channel 4 documentary Hoarded Dreams

In 1995, Themen formed a quartet with pianist John Critchinson.

Themen's style originally owed much to the influence of Dexter Gordon and Sonny Rollins, but later influences included such disparate saxophonists as Coleman Hawkins, Evan Parker, and the "sheets of sound" John Coltrane.

In November 2014 Julian Joseph interviewed Themen on BBC Radio 3's Jazz Line-Up, to celebrate his 75th birthday. Themen recalled that his musical career had begun with the clarinet which, due to a missing page in the instruction manual, he had originally played with the mouthpiece upside-down. He turned to the saxophone aged 16, after attending a concert by the Dankworth Seven, with a female cousin. The well-groomed saxophonist Danny Moss had winked at her, and the impact this had convinced Themen that his future was with the saxophone.

Following his retirement as a consultant orthopaedic surgeon, Themen has been focusing on his jazz career.

== Discography ==
- 1975: Captain Adventure - Stan Tracey Quartet
- 1976: Under Milk Wood - Stan Tracey Quartet
- 1976: The Bracknell Connection - Stan Tracey Octet
- 1979: Expressly Ellington - Al Haig, Jamil Nasser and Art Themen
- 1980: South East Assignment - Stan Tracey Quartet
- 1981: The Crompton Suite - Stan Tracey Sextet
- 1982: Bebop "Live" – Al Haig, Peter King and Art Themen
- 1984: The Poets' Suite - Stan Tracey Quartet
- 1985: Now - Stan Tracey
- 1985: Live At Ronnie Scott's - Stan Tracey Hexad
- 1987: Genesis - Stan Tracey Orchestra
- 2004: (at 60 something) - Marcia Pendlebury with Art Themen
- 2008: The 3 Tenors at the Appleby Jazz Festival – Art Themen, Mornington Lockett and Don Weller (featuring Mark Edwards, Andrew Cleyndert and Spike Wells)
- 2019: Thane & The Villeins - Art Themen Organ Trio with Pete Whittaker & George Double
- 2022: Hanky Panky - Art Themen/Dave Barry Quartet (Trio Records)
- 2022: Dizzy Moods - Art Themen Organ Trio with Pete Whittaker & George Double
- 2023: Off Piste - Greg Foat and Art Themen
- 2023: Art's Party - Art Themen and Friends
- 2024: Live in Soho - Art Themen Organ Trio with Pete Whittaker & George Double

With Graham Collier

- New Conditions (Mosaic, 1976)
- Symphony of Scorpions (Mosaic, 1977)
- The Day of the Dead (Mosaic, 1978)
- Hoarded Dreams (Cuneiform, 1983 [2007])
