= Emanem Records =

- Founded: 1974
- Founder: Martin Davidson; Madelaine Davidson
- Genre: Free improvisation
- Country of origin: UK
- Location: London, England
- Official website: www.emanemdisc.com

Emanem Records is a record company and independent record label founded in London, England in 1974 by Martin Davidson and Madelaine Davidson to record free improvisation.

Its headquarters moved to New York City (1975–76), New Jersey (1979, recordings released as Quark Records), Massachusetts (1979, recordings released as QED Records), and Sydney (1986–88), releasing about 25 records before returning to London in the 1990s and issuing compact discs. Since 2013 it has been based in Spain. The slogan of the label is "Unadulterated New Music For People Who Like New Music Unadulterated".

It has created several new recordings and archival recordings, notably its extensive documentation of the work of John Stevens and the Spontaneous Music Ensemble.

In the 2000s, Emanem joined Evan Parker's Psi and Eddie Prévost's Matchless label to present Freedom of the City, an annual improvised-music festival in London. Though its size and scope vary from year to year depending on funding, it continued as an annual event for several years, with many of the recorded performances issued on either Emanem or Matchless.

== Partial discography ==
- 4001 Derek Bailey – Domestic & Public Pieces (1975–7)
- 4002 Evan Parker & Paul Lytton Three Other Stories (1971–4)
- 4003 Spontaneous Music Ensemble Face to Face (1973)
- 4004 Steve Lacy Weal & Woe (1972–3)
- 4005 Spontaneous Music Ensemble – Summer 1967
- 4006 Anthony Braxton & Derek Bailey – First Duo Concert (1974)
- 4007 Paul Rutherford & Paul Rogers – Rogues (1988)
- 4008 Spontaneous Music Ensemble – Hot & Cold Heroes (1980/91)
- 4009 Evan Parker & Paul Lytton – Two Octobers (1972–5)
- 4010 John Russell & Roger Turner – Birthdays (1996)
- 4011 John Carter & Bobby Bradford Tandem 1 (1982)
- 4012 John Carter & Bobby Bradford Tandem 2 (1979–82)
- 4013 Derek Bailey Lace (1989)
- 4014 Roger Smith Unexpected Turns (1993–6)
- 4015 Spontaneous Music Ensemble – Quintessence 1 (1973–4) Replaced By 4217
- 4016 Spontaneous Music Ensemble – Quintessence 2 (1973–4) Replaced By 4217
- 4017 Nigel Coombes & Steve Beresford Two to Tangle (1997)
- 4018 Paul Rutherford & Iskra 1912 Sequences 72 & 73 (1972–4)
- 4019 Paul Rutherford The Gentle Harm of the Bourgeoisie (1974)
- 4020 Spontaneous Music Ensemble – Withdrawal (1966–7)
- 4021 Lol Coxhill & Veryan Weston Boundless (1998)
- 4022 Evan Parker / Barry Guy / Paul Lytton – At the Vortex (1996)
- 4023 Spontaneous Music Ensemble – For You to Share (1970)
- 4024 Steve Lacy Saxophone Special + (1973–4)
- 4025 Phil Minton A Doughnut in Both Hands (1975–82)
- 4026 RoTToR The First Full Turn (1998)
- 4027 Derek Bailey Fairly Early With Postscripts (1971–98)
- 4028 Veryan Weston / John Edwards / Mark Sanders Mercury Concert (1998)
- 4029 John Butcher / Phil Durrant / John Russell The Scenic Route (1998)
- 4030 Evan Parker / Paul Rutherford / Hans Schneider / Paul Lytton Waterloo 1985
- 4031 Spontaneous Music Ensemble Low Profile (1977/84/88)
- 4032 Roger Smith Extended Plays (1993–7)
- 4033 Kent Carter & Albrecht Maurer The Juillaguet Collection (1996)
- 4034 Lol Coxhill Alone and Together (1991–9)
- 4035 Evan Parker / Steve Beresford / John Edwards / Louis Moholo Foxes Fox (1999)
- 4036 John Russell / Maarten Altena / Terry Day The Fairly Young Bean (1981)
- 4037 Karl Berger & Ed Blackwell Just Play (1976)
- 4038 Three & Four Pullovers (1975–8)
- 4039 Spontaneous Music Orchestra Mouthpiece (1973)
- 4040 Tony Bianco / Paul Dunmall / Simon Picard Utoma Trio (1999)
- 4041 Masashi Harada Condanction Ensemble Enter the Continent (1999)
- 4042 Steve Lacy Hooky (1976)
- 4043 Frank Lowe & Eugene Chadbourne Don't Punk Out (1977 + 1979 & 2000)
- 4044 Howard Riley / Barry Guy / Tony Oxley Synopsis (1973)
- 4045 John Butcher Fixations (14) (1997–2000)
- 4046 Pat Thomas Nur (1999)
- 4047 The Kryonics (2000)
- 4048 Veryan Weston & Caroline Kraabel Five Shadows (1999–2000)
- 4049 John Butcher With Derek Bailey & Rhodri Davies Vortices & Angels (2000)
- 4050 Quatuor Accorde Angel Gate (1998–2000)
- 4051 Iskra 1903 Frankfurt 1991
- 4052 Lol Coxhill Digswell Duets (1978)
- 4053 Spontaneous Music Ensemble Challenge (1966–7)
- 4054 Howard Riley / Barry Guy / Tony Oxley Overground (1974–5)
- 4055 Evan Parker The Ayes Have It (1983 & 1991)
- 4056 Chris Burn Ensemble The Place 1991
- 4057 Sylvia Hallett White Fog (1998–2001)
- 4058 John Russell & Roger Turner The Second Sky (2001)
- 4059 Ian Smith Daybreak (2000)
- 4060 Milo Fine Free Jazz Ensemble Koi/Klops (2000–1)
- 4061 Kent Carter Beauvais Cathedral (1974–5)
- 4062 Spontaneous Music Orchestra Plus Equals (1974–5)
- 4063 Chris Burn / John Butcher / Rhodri Davies / John Edwards The First Two Gigs (2000)
- 4064 Steve Beresford / Pat Thomas / Veryan Weston 3 Pianos (2001)
- 4065 Frode Gjerstad / John Stevens / Derek Bailey Hello Goodbye (1992)
- 4066 Iskra 1903 Buzz Soundtrack (1970/1)
- 4067 Tony Wren / Larry Stabbins / Howard Riley / Mark Sanders Four in the Afternoon (2001)
- 4068 Maggie Nicols / Caroline Kraabel / Charlotte Hug Transitions (2001)
- 4069 Trevor Watts & Veryan Weston 6 Dialogues (2001)
- 4070 Barry Guy / Howard Riley / Philipp Wachsmann Improvisations Are Forever Now (1977–9)
- 4071 John Russell From Next to Last (2001–2)
- 4072 Paul Rutherford Trombolenium (1986–1995)
- 4073 Roger Smith Green Wood (2002)
- 4074 Lol Coxhill & Veryan Weston Worms Organising Archdukes (2000–1)
- 4075 Lines In Australia (2000)
- 4076 Paul Lovens / Paul Hubweber / John Edwards Papajo (2002)
- 4077 Mike Adcock & Clive Bell Sleep It Off (1999–2001)
- 4078 Paul Rogers Listen (1989/99)
- 4079 Lunge Strong Language (2000/2)
- 4080 Chris Burn Ensemble Horizontals White (2001)
- 4081 Roland Ramanan Shaken (2001–2)
- 4082 Paul Rutherford Chicago 2002
- 4083 Roger Smith Spanish Guitar (1980/92/97)
- 4084 Markus Eichenberger Domino Concept for Orchestra (2001)
- 4085 Charlotte Hug Neuland (2001–2)
- 4086 Lol Coxhill Out to Launch (2001–2)
- 4087 Frode Gjerstad & Derek Bailey Nearly A D (2002)
- 4088 Howard Riley / John Tilbury / Keith Tippett Another Part of the Story (2002)
- 4089 John Butcher & John Edwards Optic (2001–2)
- 4090 London Improvisers Orchestra Freedom of the City 2002
- 4091 The Gathering For John Stevens (2002)
- 4092 Alan Tomlinson / Steve Beresford / Roger Turner Trap Street (2002)
- 4093 Larry Stabbins Monadic (2002)
- 4094 John Edwards & Mark Sanders Nisus Duets (2002)
- 4095 Veryan Weston Tessellations For Luthéal Piano (2003)
- 4096 Bobby Bradford Love's Dream (1973)
- 4097 Lol Coxhill / Torsten Müller / Paul Rutherford Milwaukee 2002
- 4098 Elliott Sharp – The Velocity of Hue (2003)
- 4099 Derek Bailey & Milo Fine Scale Points on the Fever Curve (2003)
- 4100 Mopomoso Solos 2002
- 4101 Paul Dunmall & Paul Rogers Awareness Response (2003)
- 4102 People Band 1968
- 4103 Gail Brand & Morgan Guberman Ballgames & Crazy (2002)
- 4104 Tony Bianco / Dave Liebman / Tony Marino Line Ish (2003)
- 4105 Kent Carter String Trio The Willisau Suites (1984/1997)
- 4106 John Russell / Ute Völker / Mathieu Werchowski Three Planets (2003)
- 4107 Paul Rutherford Trio Gheim – Live at Bracknell 1983
- 4108 Masashi Harada Condanction Ensemble Enterprising Mass of Cilia (2001)
- 4109 Fred Lonberg–Holm Dialogs (2002)
- 4110 London Improvisers Orchestra Responses, Reproduction & Reality (2003–4)
- 4111 Paul Dunmall In Your Shell Like (2003)
- 4112 Clive Bell & Sylvia Hallett The Geographers (2004)
- 4113 Anthony Braxton & Milo Fine Shadow Company (2004)
- 4114 Roger Smith & Louis Moholo–Moholo The Butterfly and the Bee (2004)
- 4115 Spontaneous Music Ensemble A New Distance (1993–4)
- 4116 Free Base The Ins and Outs (2003)
- 4117 John Stevens Quartet New Cool (1992)
- 4118 Paul Rutherford Neuph (1978/80)
- 4119 Olaf Rupp / Tony Buck / Joe Williamson Weird Weapons (2002)
- 4120 Badland The Society of the Spectacle (2003)
- 4121 News From The Shed (1989)
- 4122 Collectif Inaudible Cardo (2001–5)
- 4123 Roland Ramanan Caesura (2003)
- 4124 Malcolm Goldstein & Masashi Harada Soil (2002)
- 4125 Terry Day Interruptions (1978–1981)
- 4126 Supermodel Supermodel (2002–3)
- 4127 Howard Riley Two Is One (2005)
- 4128 Ross Bolleter Secret Sandhills And Satellites (2001–5)
- 4129 Michael Keith / John Oswald / Roger Turner Number Nine (2005)
- 4130 Kent Carter String Trio Intersections (2004/5)
- 4131 Roswell Rudd Blown Bone (1976)
- 4132 Milo Fine & Viv Corringham Senilità (2005)
- 4133 Elliott Sharp & Reinhold Friedl Feuchtify (2001)
- 4134 Spontaneous Music Ensemble Frameworks (1968/71/73)
- 4135 Adam Bohman & Roger Smith Reality Fandango (2004/6)
- 4136 Lol Coxhill More Together Than Alone (2000–5)
- 4137 Terry Day 2006 Duos
- 4138 John Russell Analekta (2004/6)
- 4139 Freedom of the City 2006
- 4140 Phil Minton Quartet Slur (2006)
- 4141 Trio of Uncertainty Unlocked (2007)
- 4142 John Butcher The Geometry of Sentiment (2004/6)
- 4143 Elliott Sharp & Charlotte Hug Pi:K (2004/5)
- 4144 Paul Rutherford Solo in Berlin 1975
- 4145 Pascal Marzan & Roger Smith Two Spanish Guitars (2006/7)
- 4146 Grosse Abfahrt Everything That Disappears (2007)
- 4147 Barkingside (2006/7)
- 4148 Phil Minton No Doughnuts in Hand (2007)
- 4149 Caetitu (2007)
- 4150 Spontaneous Music Ensemble & Orchestra Trio & Triangle (1978/1981)
- 5045 Paul Rutherford In Backward Times (2017)
- 5202 Paul Rutherford Tetralogy (2009)
- 5301 Rivière Composers' Pool Summer Works 2009 with Kent Carter, Theo Jörgensmann (2010)
- 5311 Iskra 1903 Chapter One 1970–1972

Source: emanemdisc.com/cds.html
