= Veryan Weston =

British pianist (born 1950)

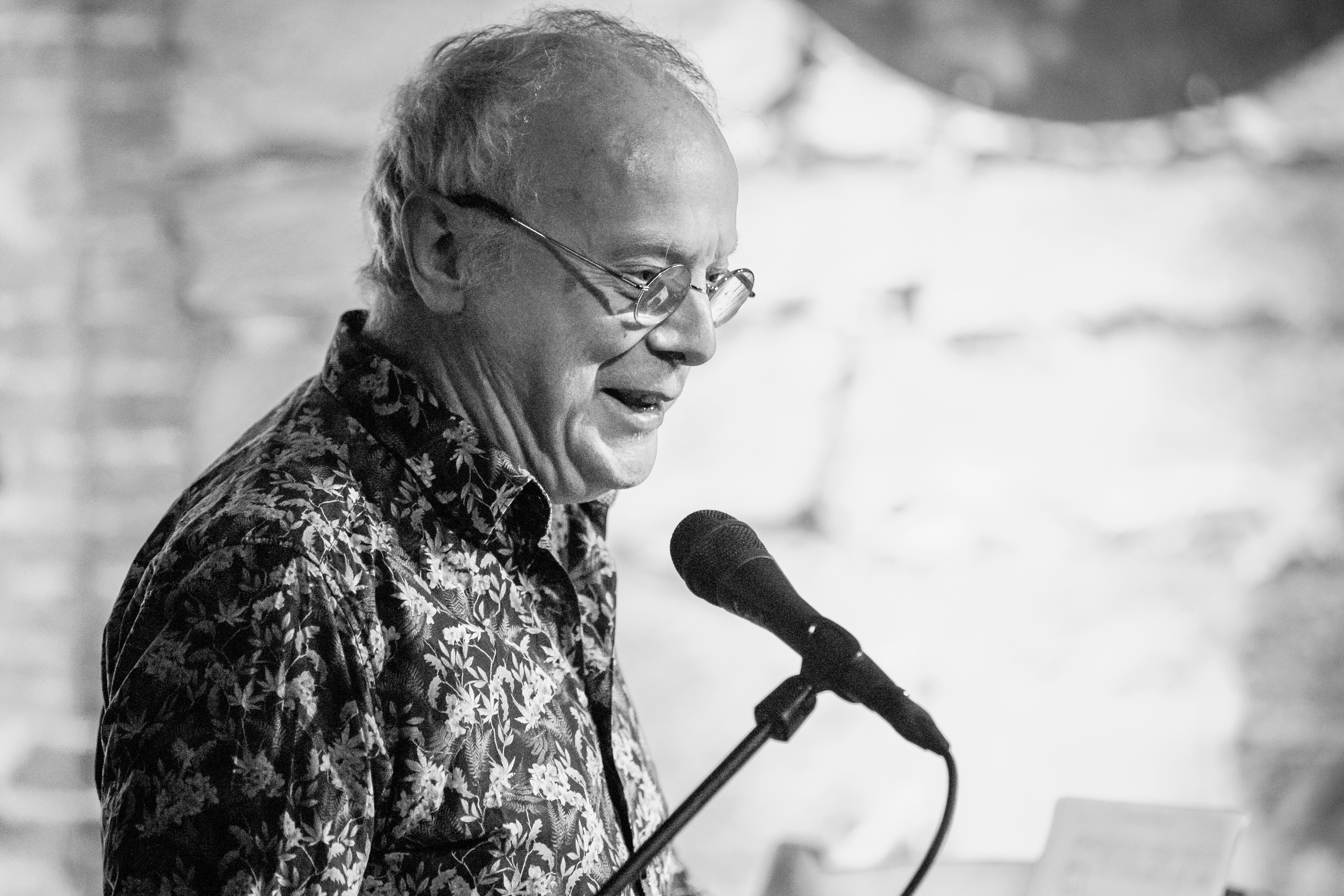
- Veryan Weston performing in Smeltehytta, Kongsberg 2024; Photo: Tore Sætre

Background information
- Born: 3 September 1950 (age 75); Sussex, England
- Genres: Free improvisation, jazz, classical
- Occupation: Musician
- Instruments: Piano, keyboards
- Years active: 1970s–present
- Label: Emanem
- Website: veryanweston.weebly.com

Veryan Weston (born 1950) is a British pianist active in free improvisation, jazz, and rock music. He has worked with Lol Coxhill, Eddie Prévost, Trevor Watts, Caroline Kraabel and Phil Minton.

Weston was born in 1950 and lived in Cornwall before moving to London in 1972.

== Discography ==
- Underwater Carol (Matchless, 1987)
- Playing Alone (Acta, 1997)
- Mercury Concert (Emanem, 1999)
- Unearthed (33 Records, 1999)
- Five Shadows (Emanem, 2001)
- Tessellations for Lutheal Piano (Emanem, 2003)
- Gateway to Vienna (Emanem, 2005)
- Unlocked (Emanem, 2007)
- Allusions (Emanem, 2009)
- Different Tessellations (Emanem, 2011)
- Haste (Emanem, 2012)
- Dialogues for Ornette! (FMR, 2015)
- Tuning Out (Emanem, 2015)
- Discoveries On Tracker Action Organs (Emanem, 2016)
- The Make Project (Barnyard, 2018)
- Crossings (Hi 4Head, 2020)

=== As sideman ===
With Lol Coxhill

- The Joy of Paranoia (Ogun, 1978)
- Digswell Duets (Random Radar, 1979)
- Cou$cou$ (Nato, 1984)
- The Inimitable (Chabada, 1985)
- Frog Dance (Impetus, 1986)
- Boundless (Emanem, 1998)
- Coxhill On Ogun (Ogun, 1998)
- Spectral Soprano (Emanem, 2002)
- Worms Organising Archdukes (Emanem, 2002)
- Out to Launch (Emanem, 2003)

With Phil Minton

- Ways (ITM, 1987)
- Ways Past (ITM, 1992)
- Songs from a Prison Diary (Leo, 1993)
- Mouthfull of Ecstasy (Victo, 1996)
- Ways Out East, Ways Out West (Intakt, 2005)
- Slur (Emanem, 2007)

With Trevor Watts

- Trevor Watts' Moire Music (Arc, 1985)
- Saalfelden Encore (Cadillac, 1987)
- With One Voice (Arc, 1988)
- 6 Dialogues (Emanem, 2002)
- 5 More Dialogues (Emanem, 2011)
- Dialogues in Two Places (Hi 4 Head, 2012)
- At Ad Libitum (for Tune, 2015)
- Dialogues with Strings (Fundacja Suchaj, 2017)
- The Real Intention (Fundacja Suchaj, 2020)

With others

- Steve Beresford, 3 Pianos (Emanem, 2001)
- Caroline Kraabel, Playtime (Mass Producers, 2009)
- Caroline Kraabel, Last1 and Last2 (Emanem, 2019)
- Eddie Prevost, Continuum (Matchless, 1985)
- Jon Rose, Temperament (Emanem, 2002)
- Jon Rose, Tunings & Tunes (HEyeRMEarS/Discorbie 2010)
- Paul Rutherford, In Backward Times (Emanem, 2017)
- Ian Smith, Daybreak (Emanem, 2001)
