= Slur =

Slur may refer to:

- Slur (music), a symbol in Western musical notation indicating that the notes it embraces are to be played without separation
- Pejorative, a term expressing a negative or disrespectful connotation, a low opinion, or a lack of respect toward someone or potentially something
  - Ethnic slur, a type of pejorative term used towards members of specific ethnic groups
- Slur.EXE, an antagonist from Rockman.EXE Stream
- Slur (album), 2007, by the Phil Minton Quartet
