= Paul Rogers (bassist) =

English bassist

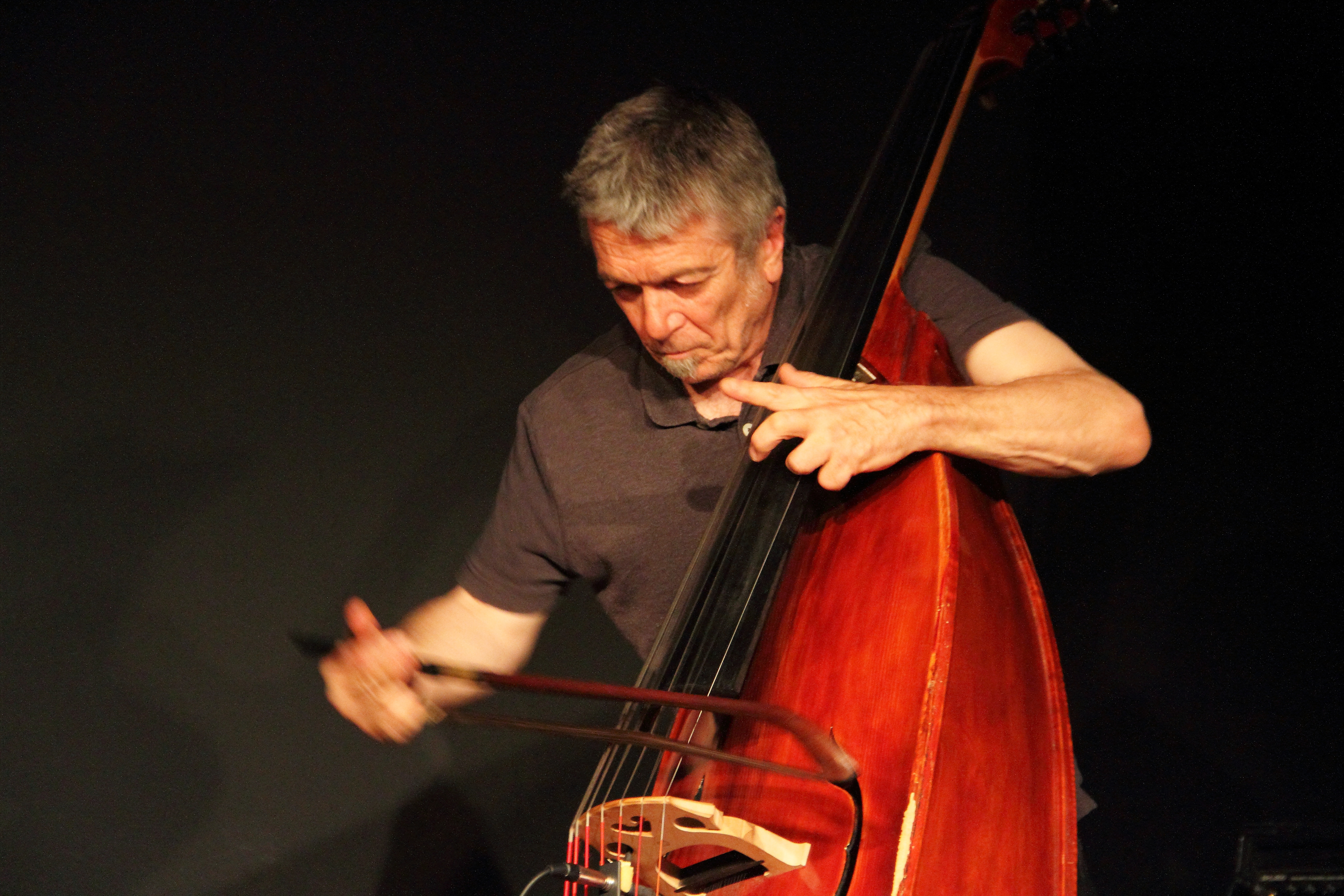

Background information
- Born: 20 April 1956 (age 70)
- Origin: Luton, Bedfordshire, England
- Genre: Free improvisation
- Occupation: Bassist
- Instrument: Double bass
- Labels: Setola di Maiale, Emanem
- Formerly of: Mujician

Paul Rogers (born 20 April 1956) is an English bassist.

== Career ==
He was born in Luton, Bedfordshire, England. Rogers is best known as a member of improvising jazz group Mujician, but has also released a number of solo records. He also composed a suite, with assistance from an Arts Council grant, which was intended for three saxophgones, flute, bass and drums. The piece Anglo American Sketches toured nationally in 1990 to some acclaim.

== Selected discography ==
- 1986 – Gheim (Emanem) with Paul Rutherford
- 1989 – Listen (Emanem) solo
- 1995 – Heron Moon (Rare Music) solo
- 1996 – Rogues (Emanem) with Paul Rutherford
- 1998 – The First Full Turn (Emanem) with RoTToR (Paul Rutherford, Julie Tippett, Keith Tippett, Rogers)
- 2001 – The Ayes Have It (Emanem) with Evan Parker
- 2007 – Being (Amor Fati) solo
- 2007 – Two Loose (FMR) with Edward Perraud
- 2009 – Tetralogy (Emanem) with Paul Rutherford
- 2017 – In Backward Times (Emanem) with Paul Rutherford
- 2018 – Bag of Screams (Setola di Maiale) with Emil Gross
