= In the Tradition =

In the Tradition may refer to:

- In the Tradition (Alan Silva, Johannes Bauer, and Roger Turner album), 1996
- In the Tradition (Anthony Braxton album), 1974
- In the Tradition Volume 2, Anthony Braxton album recorded in 1974 and released in 1977
- In the Tradition (Arthur Blythe album), 1978
- In the Tradition (Dave Van Ronk album), 1964
