= Trombolenium =

Live album by Paul Rutherford
- Released: 2002
- Recorded: Summer 1986; April 15, 1992; June 26, 1993; September 3, 1995
- Venue: London; Noci, Italy
- Genre: Free jazz
- Length: 1:16:17
- Label: Emanem; 4072

Paul Rutherford chronology
The First Full Turn (1998)	Trombolenium (2002)	Chicago 2002 (2002)

Trombolenium: Solo Trombone Improvisations 1986–1995 is a live solo album by trombonist Paul Rutherford. It was recorded at various concerts in London and Noci, Italy, during 1986, 1992, 1993, and 1995, and was released in 2002 by Emanem Records.

== Reception ==
Professional ratings
Review scores
Source	Rating
AllMusic	2.5/5 stars
The Penguin Guide to Jazz	3.5/4 stars

In a review for AllMusic, François Couture wrote: "Rutherford's legendary playfulness and his relaxed attitude welcome listeners from the start. Throughout the album the trombonist demonstrates an extensive range of personal techniques that never take over the warmth and lyricism familiar to his music... He is a delight to hear... constantly challenging expectations and eschewing clichés."

The authors of The Penguin Guide to Jazz Recordings stated: "Almost a decade's worth of solo performance. The sound-quality varies hugely, or rather the acoustics do, and it is interesting to hear how responsive Paul was to different environments."

Derek Taylor of One Final Note called the album "a solid companion and supplement" to Rutherford's 1976 debut release The Gentle Harm of the Bourgeoisie, and commented: "Rutherford's understanding of natural acoustics borders on the encyclopedic and his abilities in this regard are on broad display."

Writing for the BBC Music Magazine, Richard Cook remarked: "Though the acoustics vary from very dry to spacious, all the music emerges with a buttonholing immediacy. Anyone who's ever tried playing the trombone will recognise at once a remarkable master of his instrument, but the curious thing about Rutherford's music is its universality. Nothing needs to be 'learned' to appreciate what he does, and to love it."

== Track listing ==
1. "Red Rose Afternoon 1" – 6:17
2. "Red Rose Afternoon 2" – 5:11
3. "First Walnut" – 19:20
4. "Second Walnut" – 5:03
5. "First China Pig Extract" – 8:43
6. "Second China Pig Extract" – 7:47
7. "China Pig Lament" – 5:03
8. "Stalf" – 3:29
9. "Falst" – 3:05
10. "Flast" – 6:36
11. "Stlaf" – 5:43
- Tracks 1 and 2 were recorded on September 3, 1995, at the Red Rose in London. Tracks 3 and 4 were recorded on June 26, 1993, during the Europa Jazz Festival in Noci, Italy. Tracks 5–7 were recorded on April 15, 1992, at the China Pig in London. Tracks 8–11 were recorded during the summer of 1986 at St Alfege's Church in London.

== Personnel ==
- Paul Rutherford – trombone
