= Iskra³ =

Studio album by Paul Rutherford
- Released: 2005
- Recorded: September 26, 2004
- Studio: Lawrence Electronic Operations, the Chilterns, England
- Genre: Free improvisation
- Label: Psi; 05.02

Paul Rutherford chronology
| Chicago 2002 (2002) | Iskra³ (2005) | Hoxha (2005) |

Iskra³ is an album by trombonist Paul Rutherford. It was recorded on September 26, 2004, at Lawrence Electronic Operations in the Chilterns, England, and was released in 2005 by Psi Records. On the album, Rutherford is joined by computer musicians Robert Jarvis and Lawrence Casserley.

== Reception ==
Professional ratings
Review scores
| Source | Rating |
|---|---|
| AllMusic | 3.5/5 stars |
| The Penguin Guide to Jazz | 4/4 stars |

In a review for AllMusic, François Couture wrote: "Computer, trombone and computer are locked in a complex three-way dance. Rutherford is left ample room to breathe and play. His signature tone provides the backbone of the whole album, Casserley and Jarvis explode, fragment and refract the trombone's input, and these digitalized ghost images trigger from Rutherford a kind of interaction that is strikingly different from his behavior with acoustic instrumentalists... Iskra3 may remain an oddity in Rutherford's discography, but it is more than a simple concession to the electro-acoustic improv trend of the mid-'00s."

The authors of The Penguin Guide to Jazz Recordings awarded the album a full 4 stars, calling it "a new stage in Rutherford's remarkable career." They commented: "These are immensely powerful pieces, still dominated by Rutherford's trombone-playing, but now in the context of a highly responsive background that gives the music mass and density as well as line and presence."

John Eyles of All About Jazz noted that the album, at best, is "an electronic concerto with Rutherford as its soloist," and stated that "Rutherford is never subsumed by the electronics, but he seems surrounded by them in an alien environment." However, he cautioned: "this music is best taken in small doses; it's potent stuff." AAJ's Andrey Henkin suggested that, in relation to Neuph (1978), Iskra³ is "a different beast as Rutherford has a more traditional function... but utilizes a modern innovation—computer processing—to update what an acoustic instrument, albeit one played in expert hands, can accomplish when its musical counterpart is a machine, though one manipulated by its own duo of improvisors."

== Track listing ==
Composed by Lawrence Casserley, Paul Rutherford, and Robert Jarvis.

1. "Act 1: Zenquahn" – 5:37
2. "Act 1: Ombuhl" – 12:52
3. "Act 1: Bodrivar" – 12:09
4. "Act 1: Falgoric" – 8:05
5. "Act 2: Brelfor" – 11:06
6. "Act 2: Felcrum" – 13:26
7. "Act 2: Myilcra" – 7:36

== Personnel ==
- Paul Rutherford – trombone
- Robert Jarvis – live computer processing
- Lawrence Casserley – live computer processing
