= Allison Cameron (composer) =

Canadian composer (born 1963)

- Born: 1963 (age 62–63); Edmonton, Alberta, Canada
- Genres: Contemporary classical, free improvisation, experimental
- Occupations: Composer, musician
- Instruments: Keyboards, ukulele, banjo
- Label: Spool (record label)
- Website: www.allisoncameron.com

Allison Cameron (born 1963) is a Canadian composer of contemporary classical music. She composes works for conventional classical instruments, early music instruments, and modern electric instruments such as the electric guitar. She is also a performer of free improvisation and experimental music.

== Early life and education ==
Cameron was born in Edmonton, Alberta, and moved with her family to North Vancouver. She studied at the University of Victoria and York University. She has cited Michael Longton and Rudolf Komorous as significant influences.

== Career ==
Cameron moved to Toronto in 1989. She founded a six-piece chamber ensemble, Arcana, in 1992, which performs a contemporary composition repertoire. In 1995 she released a CD of chamber music, Raw Sangudo.

Cameron's 1998 composition, "Retablo", was commissioned through the Canada Council for the Arts to be played by the classical music quartet The Burdocks. Her 2000 release, Ornaments, features her compositions performed by violinist Marc Sabat, pianist Stephen Clarke, and clarinetist Ronda Rindone.

Cameron has worked with Louis Andriessen, Gilius van Bergeijk, Per Nørgård, and Frederic Rzewski in Europe, and Rudolf Komorous, Michael Longton, and James Tenney in Canada. She was a member of the Drystone Orchestra, along with Martin Arnold, Stephen Parkinson, and John Abram. She also performs in a duet with Parkinson.

Her music has been performed at the Bang on a Can Festival and she has been commissioned by the Bang on a Can All-Stars. Recordings of her music have been released by the CRI and XI (Experimental Intermedia) labels. In 2004, she was music director of the contemporary ensemble Arraymusic.

In 2013, the Allison Cameron Band (Cameron, Eric Chenaux and Parkinson), released an album, Bent Spoon Duo, Without and With Allison Cameron through the Rat Drifting label.

== Discography ==
- 1995 – Raw Sangudo. CD. Experimental Intermedia.
- 1998 – Leisure. CD. Maarten Altena Ensemble. Donemus.
- 2002 – Ornaments. CD. Spool.
- 2004 – Canevas (Fin Fin). CD. Ensemble SuperMusique. DAME.
- 2010 – The Allison Cameron Band. CD. Rat-Drifting.
- 2012 – Mach Shorn – The EP. Stephen Parkinson, Sandro Perri, Marla Hlady, Christof Migone, Eric Chenaux, Allison Cameron.
- 2015 – A-Gossamer-Bit. CD. Redshift Music Society.
- 2022 – Somatic Refrain. CD. Apartment House. Another Timbre.

Compilations included on:

- 1992 – Bang on a Can Live. Vol. 1. CD. Emergency Music series. New York, New York: CRI. (Contains Two Bits by Allison Cameron.)
- 2001 – ArrayMusic Ensemble; compilation CD, Artifact, Toronto.
- 2008 – Rains Out. CD, Veni Ensemble Bratislava, Hevhetia.
- 2004 – The Art of Touching The Keyboard CD, Eve Egoyan, Earwitness Records.
