= Gheim =

Live album by Paul Rutherford Trio
- Released: 1986 / 2004
- Recorded: 1983
- Venue: Bracknell Jazz Festival
- Genre: Free jazz
- Length: 1:16:49
- Label: Ogun; 531; Emanem; 4107/5034
- Producer: Martin Davidson

Paul Rutherford chronology
To Fall a Victim to Ice-Cream's Charm (1980)	Gheim (1986)	Rogues (1996)

Gheim is an album by trombonist Paul Rutherford and his trio, featuring bassist Paul Rogers and drummer Nigel Morris. The first two tracks were recorded live at the Bracknell Jazz Festival on July 2, 1983, and were originally released by the Ogun label in 1986 on a cassette titled Bracknell '83. In 2004, Emanem Records reissued the live tracks, along with three tracks that were recorded in a London studio on December 12, 1983, on a CD titled Gheim. The disc, with all five tracks, was reissued by Emanem in 2014.

== Reception ==
Professional ratings
Review scores
Source	Rating
AllMusic	3.5/5 stars
The Penguin Guide to Jazz	4/4 stars
All About Jazz	4/5 stars

In a review for AllMusic, François Couture wrote: "Rutherford hardly ever had an off year and 1983 certainly wasn't one. This recording finds him stretching toward jazz licks without ever crossing that line, instead integrating his fragmented phrasing and amazing sounds to the free jazz pulse, all the while displaying bottomless creativity... The live set is more energetic and relentless..., while the studio set is closer to the kind of European free improvisation you would expect from Rutherford."

The authors of The Penguin Guide to Jazz Recordings awarded the album a full 4 stars, and noted Rutherford's sense of humor, stating: "The trombone has obvious slapstick potential, but you'll come away from this smiling at the sheer joy he takes in making those beautiful, human, inhuman sounds."

Germein Linares of All About Jazz called the recording "a tremendous and valuable jazz album," and, regarding the two live tracks, commented: "How these players get from point to the next is a rather stunning development. It is a seamless, on-the-run, shift from one theme to another, a fascinating example of the best in free jazz."

Writer Raul Da Gama stated that the album "will leave the music aficionado breathless," and remarked: "The trombone was a wild thing in the hands of the late Paul Rutherford. His was a primordial, human voice moaning and crying with elemental yowls, moaning growls and guttural smears that seem to come not only from the lips and tongue rattling on gums and palate, but from deep within the throat with great gulps of air from his lungs." He also praised Rogers and Morris, describing them as "astounding players."

Regarding the live tracks, Peter Marsh of the BBC, wrote: "there's something of the festival vibe about the music here. It's high energy stuff, but it changes shape throughout with bewildering ease and fluidity, from freebop polyrhythmic pummelling to spidery ballad forms to spacey textural exploration..." He concluded: "highly recommended."

Writing for One Final Note, Michael Rosenstein called the album "a valuable glimpse at an area of Rutherford's career that is not well documented, as well as an intriguing chronicle of Rogers in a formative state of his playing."

== Track listing ==
1. "Gheim 1" – 34:27
2. "Gheim 2" – 15:03
3. "Brandak" – 10:19
4. "Crontak" – 8:50
5. "Prindalf" – 6:49
- Tracks 1–2 were recorded on July 2, 1983, at the Bracknell Jazz Festival. Tracks 3–5 were recorded on December 12, 1983, in a London studio.

== Personnel ==
- Paul Rutherford – trombone (tracks 1–4), euphonium (track 5)
- Paul Rogers – bass
- Nigel Morris – drums
