= The Zone (Paul Rutherford, Torsten Müller, and Harris Eisenstadt album) =

Live album by Paul Rutherford, Torsten Müller, and Harris Eisenstadt
- Released: 2006
- Recorded: January 21, 2006
- Venue: Center for Contemporary Art, Santa Fe, New Mexico
- Genre: Free jazz
- Label: Konnex; KCD 5176

Paul Rutherford chronology
Hoxha (2005)	The Zone (2006)	Solo in Berlin 1975 (2007)

The Zone is a live album by trombonist Paul Rutherford, bassist Torsten Müller, and drummer Harris Eisenstadt. It was recorded on January 21, 2006, at the Center for Contemporary Art in Santa Fe, New Mexico, and was released later that year by the German Konnex label.

== Reception ==
Professional ratings
Review scores
Source	Rating
The Penguin Guide to Jazz	4/4 stars

The authors of The Penguin Guide to Jazz Recordings awarded the album a full 4 stars, calling it "superb," and praising the group's "great collective understanding." They described Müller as "the only European bassist who can currently aspire to Peter Kowald's crown," and noted that Eisenstadt's "quiet, concentrated approach adds hugely" to the recording. They stated that, on the opening track, "it is genuinely difficult to separate 'bone squeaks, Müller's creaking-branch effects and the delicate susurrus of Eisenstadt's kit. The sound flows easily and as if from a single imagination - perhaps The Zone is the locus."

Jeff Stockton of All About Jazz described the music as "cerebral minimalism," and wrote: "veteran trombonist Paul Rutherford keeps to soft bursts of notes, bassist Torsten Müller quietly bows and lightly bounces on and off his strings and Eisenstadt spends a lot of time gently tapping on the wooden edge of his drum. Barely perceptible squeaks contribute to the atmosphere, as if someone were scratching nylon with his fingernails."

== Track listing ==
Composed by Paul Rutherford, Torsten Müller, and Harris Eisenstadt.

1. "Booming Ground" – 16:26
2. "The Zone" – 9:52
3. "Laughing Lizard" – 11:49
4. "Schoenberg Swung Am Hardesten" – 20:12

== Personnel ==
- Paul Rutherford – trombone
- Torsten Müller – bass
- Harris Eisenstadt – drums
