= Listen (Paul Rogers album) =

Live album by Paul Rogers
- Released: 2002
- Recorded: October 8, 1989; May 1, 1999
- Venue: Sir Walter Scott, London; Theatre P Scarron, Le Mans, France
- Genre: Free jazz
- Length: 1:06:53
- Label: Emanem; 4078

Listen: Double Bass Solos 1989 & 1999 is a live solo album by double bassist Paul Rogers. Three tracks were recorded on May 1, 1999, in Le Mans, France, while the remaining track was recorded on October 8, 1989, in London. The album was released in 2002 by Emanem Records.

== Reception ==
Professional ratings
Review scores
Source	Rating
AllMusic	4/5 stars
The Penguin Guide to Jazz	4/4 stars

In a review for AllMusic, Dan Warburton wrote: "the music [Rogers] produces always manages to steer clear of the all-out physical endurance test aesthetic of a Peter Kowald or a William Parker. His bowed work is rich and resonant, and as open to folk-inflected melody as it is to extended techniques... and he manages to make the venerable instrument sound like anything from a violin to a sitar to a lap steel."

The authors of The Penguin Guide to Jazz Recordings awarded the album a full 4 stars, noting that it "can stand with the best solo-bass albums." They stated: "Rogers makes the bass sound as it is, a big, resonant, capacious instrument. He isn't shy of melodic patterns or conventional timbres, although he makes these elements part of a rushing flow which evolves so quickly that it asks the listener to be very alert."

Peter Marsh of the BBC called the music "stunning," and commented: "Rogers' vocabulary is huge and his facility pretty incredible... His tone is rich, punchy and resonant, and the lovely recording gives the bass a warm, physical presence that still has ambience... Listen is a tour de force of the first order; highly recommended to any fan of solo bass, but for those who simply enjoy hearing a master improviser at work, there's much to savour here."

Dusted Magazine's Derek Taylor remarked: "each [piece] is a densely packed encapsulation of Rogers' action-oriented technique on the double bass. In his consummately capable hands the entire instrument is a canvas; virtually no surface is left unscathed... The entire disc is one that will almost certainly leave mouths agape and ears in want of more. A coveted signifier like 'virtuosic' almost seems like a pittance when applied to a talent as towering as Rogers."

== Track listing ==
1. "Listen 99" – 38:56
2. "Listen 99 Bis" – 3:40
3. "Listen 99 Ter" – 4:55
4. "Listen 89" – 19:07
- Tracks 1–3 were recorded on May 1, 1999, at Theatre P Scarron in Le Mans, France. Track 4 was recorded on October 8, 1989, at Sir Walter Scott in London.

== Personnel ==
- Paul Rogers – five-string double bass, sticks, finger cymbals, drum, penny whistle
