= Solo in Berlin 1975 =

Live album by Paul Rutherford
- Released: 2007
- Recorded: March 31, 1975; November 7 and 8, 1975
- Venue: FMP Workshop Freie Musik at Akademie der Künste, Berlin; FMP Total Music Meeting at Quartier Latin, Berlin
- Genre: Free jazz
- Length: 1:15:15
- Label: Emanem; 4144
- Producer: Martin Davidson

Paul Rutherford chronology
The Zone (2006)	Solo in Berlin 1975 (2007)	Tetralogy (2009)

Solo in Berlin 1975 is a live solo trombone album by Paul Rutherford. Four tracks were recorded at the FMP Workshop Freie Musik at the Akademie der Künste in Berlin on March 31, 1975, while the remaining tracks were recorded at the FMP Total Music Meeting at Quartier Latin in Berlin on November 7 and 8, 1975. The album was released in 2007 by Emanem Records

According to Rutherford, prior to one of the concerts, he was approached by fellow trombonist Vinko Globokar, who asked him what he was going to play, and how he was going to start his set. Rutherford responded: "I don't know. I'm just going to go out and play... I don't want any idea. I'm going to improvise, and I'm going to go on to play improvised music."

== Reception ==
Professional ratings
Review scores
Source	Rating
The Penguin Guide to Jazz	3.5/4 stars

In a review for All About Jazz, Clifford Allen wrote: "Rutherford creates an environment in which events occur, jocular or athletic, pensive or indescribable as he vocalizes, hums, whinnies, belches in a treatise of sonic exploration on not only 'flicking the bugle,' as he says, but seeing what motion coupled with breath can do... These sonic events occur, but as in life, they all spring from one another, and the humanity of the experience is its defining thread."

The authors of The Penguin Guide to Jazz Recordings stated: "Producer Martin Davidson... expressed some doubt as to the morality of releasing the CD after Paul's death, lest it be though he was cashing in. In short, the music here is too important, too beautiful and affirming not to be heard."

Jason Bivins of Signal to Noise commented: "Lusty and garrulous, surly and declamatory, puckish and inquisitive, all these qualities flash in a moment, courtesy of a truly vivid musical imagination and a powerful, individual technique."

In their 2009 Book of the Year, the editors of Encyclopædia Britannica referred to the recording as an "outstanding album" and "a belated discovery." The editors of All About Jazz listed the album as an "Unearthed Gem" in their 2007 recap.

== Track listing ==
1. "Berlintro" – 9:35
2. "Berl In Zil" – 5:22
3. "A Song my Granny Taught Me" – 7:28
4. "Not a Very Wonderful Ballad" – 5:45
5. "Primus" – 16:20
6. "Secundus" – 4:26
7. "Tertius" – 13:14
8. "Quartus" – 12:24
- Tracks 1–4 were recorded on March 31, 1975, at the FMP Workshop Freie Musik at the Akademie der Künste, Berlin. Tracks 5–6 were recorded on November 7, 1975, at the FMP Total Music Meeting at Quartier Latin, Berlin. Tracks 7–8 were recorded on November 8, 1975, at the FMP Total Music Meeting at Quartier Latin, Berlin.

== Personnel ==
- Paul Rutherford – trombone
