= Spool (record label) =

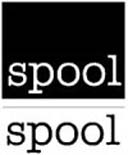
- Founded: 1998
- Founder: Vern Weber; Daniel Kernohan
- Distributor: CD Baby
- Genre: Jazz, Experimental Music, Free Improvisation
- Country of origin: Canada
- Location: Sunderland, Ontario, Canada
- Official website: spool%20(record%20label)

Spool is a Canadian record label which was founded 1997 in Peterborough, Ontario, Canada. Their first releases were in 1998. They relocated to Uxbridge, Ontario in 1999.

The name comes from the play by Samuel Beckett: Krapp's Last Tape. In the play, Krapp becomes fascinated by the word "spool" and repeats it several times. On December 27, 2001, Spool was given national notice in an article in The Globe and Mail by Canadian jazz critic Mark Miller, who said "It's work supported not by the majors, but by smaller companies – as small as Uxbridge, Ont., label Spool which released two of the most interesting Canadian CDs of 2001, West Coast guitarist Tony Wilson's melancholic Lowest Note and a boisterous collaboration between George Lewis and Vancouver's NOW Orchestra, The Shadowgraph Series." Spool releases also received reviews in the Toronto Star by Geoff Champman, as well as Coda (magazine), DownBeat, Vancouver Province, La Scena musicale, The Wire (magazine), Exclaim magazine, The Georgia Straight. In 2004, Spool received nominations for "producer of the year" and "label of the year" by the National Jazz Awards of Canada. Mark Miller, in Jazz Education Journal wrote: "And consider Canada's most active independent record labels, Ambiances Magnetiques and Effendi in Montreal, Cornerstone in Toronto, Maximum Jazz and Songlines in Vancouver, Spool in Uxbridge, Ontario and Victo in Victoriaville, Quebec. By and large, their rosters are made up of artists who seem intent on creating vital, interesting and, above all, personal music that draws not on any one tradition, but on many..."

== Discography ==
=== Line ===
Line: noun: a spatial location defined by a real or imaginary unidimensional extent

- SPL130 Anthony Braxton & the AIMToronto Orchestra Creative Orchestra (Guelph) 2007
- SPL129 Box-Cutter New Rules for Noise (w/ François Houle & Gordon Grdina)
- SPL128 Box-Cutter Unlearn (w/ François Houle & Gordon Grdina)
- SPL127 Dewey Redman & Francois Carrier Open Spaces
- SPL126 Paul Rutherford/Ken Vandermark/Torsten Muller/Dylan van der Schyff Hoxha
- SPL125 Taking Pictures with Wayne Horvitz Intersection Poems
- SPL124 Peggy Lee Band Worlds Apart
- SPL123 Rake-Star Some RA
- SPL122 Jonathan Segel & Shoko Hikage GEN
- SPL121 Brett Larner, Joelle Leandre & Kazuhisa Uchihashi No Day Rising
- SPL120 Fred Frith, Joelle Leandre & Jonathan Segel Tempted To Smile
- SPL119 Tobias Delius, Wilbert de Joode & Dylan van der Schyff The Flying Deer - 2006.
- SPL118 Michael Moore/ Peggy Lee/ Dylan van der Schyff Floating 1..2..3
- SPL117 Peggy Lee Band Sounds from the Big House
- SPL116 Fred Frith, John Oswald, Anne Bourne dearness
- SPL115 Travis Baker, Sara Shoenbeck Yesca One
- SPL114 Brett Larner Itadakimasu. Duos: Anthony Braxton, Jim O’Rourke, Gianni Gebbia, Taku Sugimoto,+
- SPL113 George Lewis & the NOW Orchestra The Shadowgraph Series - 2001.
- SPL112 Tony Wilson Sextet The Lowest Note - 2000.
- SPL111 Queen Mab (Jack Vorvis, Fides Krucker, Tina Kiik, Lee Pui Ming, Fides Krucker, Victor Bateman) close - 2000.
- SPL110 Mats Gustafsson, Kurt Newman, Mike Genarro Port Huron Picnic - 2000.
- SPL109 John Butcher, Gino Robair, Matthew Sperry 12 Milagritos - 2000.
- SPL108 Rake: David Broscoe, Jamie Gullikson, Rory Magill, Rake - 2000.
- SPL107 The NOW Orchestra with guests George Lewis, Vinny Golia & Paul Cram Wowow - 1999.
- SPL106 Jacques Israelievitch, Reinhard Reitzenstein, Jesse Stewart, Gayle Young The Test Tubes- 1999.
- SPL105 The Peggy Lee Band - 1999.
- SPL104 Eyvind Kang, Francois Houle, Dylan van der Schyff Pieces of Time - 1999.
- SPL103 Henry Kaiser, Paul Plimley (with Danielle DeGruttola) Passwords - 1998.
- SPL102 Peggy Lee, Dylan van der Schyff These Are Our Shoes - 1998.
- SPL101 Chris Tarry, Dylan van der Schyff Sponge - 1998.

=== Field ===
Field: noun: a set of elements such that addition and multiplication are commutative and associative and multiplication is distributive over addition and there are two elements 0 and 1

- SPF301 Broken Record Chamber, Free Improv For Robots- 1998.
- SPF302 Francois Houle, Au Coeur du Litige - 2000.
- SPF303 John Butcher, Mike Hansen & Tomasz Krakowiak, Equation - 2006.
- SPF304 Mike Hansen & Tomasz Krakowiak, Relay - 2005.
- SPF305 Smash & Teeny with John Butcher, Gathering - 2005.

=== Arc ===
Arc: noun: the apparent path described above and below the horizon by a celestial body

- SPA401 The Skronktet West EL- 2006.
- SPA402 John Shiurba Triplicate - 2006.
- SPA403 Matthias von Imhof Mental Scars - 2006.

=== Point ===
Point: noun: a geometric element that has position but no extension

- SPP201 Bradshaw Pack Alogos (with Talking Pictures, Pacific Baroque Orchestra, Standing Wave & David Maggs) - 2006.
- SPP202 Allison Cameron Ornaments - 2001.
- SPP203 John Korsrud Odd Jobs, Assorted Climaxes (with Hard Rubber Orchestra, Combustion Chamber, Ron Samworth and Joe Keithley) - 2005.

=== Spurn ===
Spurn: verb: reject with disdain or contempt.

- Spurn1 dk & the perfectly ordinary CAR DEW TREAT US (Allison Cameron, Rod Dubé, & Lawrence Joseph) with Guest Artists: Philippe Battikha (Ratchet Orchestra), Sean Caighean, Paul Dutton, Caroline Kunzle, Brett Larner, Al Margolis If, Bwana, Gino Robair, Paul Serralheiro, Vergil Sharkya, Ben Wilson - 2017.
- Spurn2 Equivalent Insecurity Shed Metal (dk & Dan Lander) - 2017.
- Spurn3 The Machine is Broken, Terry Rusling - 2019.
