= In Backward Times =

Live album by Paul Rutherford
- Released: 2017
- Recorded: November 22, 1979; August 27, 1988; October 26, 2004; May 7, 2007
- Venue: Teatro Auteo, Milano; Duke of Wellington, London; Petit Théâtre Mercelis, Brussels; Red Rose, London
- Genre: Free jazz
- Length: 1:15:42
- Label: Emanem; 5045

Paul Rutherford chronology
| The Conscience (2017) | In Backward Times (2017) | Are We in Diego? (2018) |

In Backward Times is a live album by trombonist Paul Rutherford. Drawn from archival tapes, it was recorded in 1979, 1988, 2004, and 2007, in Milano, London, and Brussels, and was released in 2017 by Emanem Records. On track 1, Rutherford is accompanied by live electronics, while track 2 is a duet with bassist Paul Rogers. Track 3 is a solo performance, and track 4 is a trio setting featuring cellist Marcio Mattos and pianist Veryan Weston. The final track was recorded roughly three months before Rutherford's death, and documents his last public performance.

== Reception ==
Professional ratings
Review scores
| Source | Rating |
|---|---|
| All About Jazz | 3.5/5 stars |

In a review for All About Jazz, John Eyles called the album "extraordinary" and "a rich and varied portrait of [Rutherford] that is powerful evidence of his pre-eminence." He wrote: "Solo, with or without electronics, he managed to construct dialogues with himself that invariably draw the listener in. In groups with others, be they duos or trios, he never seemed to hog the limelight but was a generous collaborator; nonetheless, time and again, it is the humanity of his playing that captures listeners' attention."

Marc Medwin of Dusted Magazine stated: "Rutherford's work presents a sonic unity in the face of staggering diversity and invention. Each tone, half-tone and other namelessly unique gestures obviously spring from the same wellspring of creativity while avoiding the crutches of constantly recurrent pattern needed by lesser improvisers to avoid a fall on the proverbial face. New confirmation of Rutherford's still underappreciated genius is always welcome, and it can be shown in no better light than on this new chronologically diverse but musically unified disc."

Writer Raul Da Gama commented: "what Mr Rutherford celebrates in grand, breathtaking manner forms a sort of central theme of human liberty... [he] seems to be rejoicing in the empirical fact that it is by means of music that the individual breaks free of every shackle... This disc... is a timely reminder of his musical legacy; a worthy tribute to one of the great musical masters of our time."

Regarding the solo track, Point of Departure's Michael Rosenstein remarked: "There is nothing in the least bit reductive in his strategies. Instead, there is more patience in the way he lets the arc of the solo unfold. He also makes particularly effective use of the juxtaposition of the extremes of register of the horn, leaping effortlessly from the lowest growls to the highest, clarion peals."

Writing for The New York City Jazz Record, Clifford Allen praised Emanem founder Martin Davidson for extracting the music from the label's "treasure trove of archival recordings," and called the trio track "a joyous coda to a life truly lived," consisting of "eliding flicks, pointillist chunks... and... harried harmonic gestures."

In an article for JazzWord, Ken Waxman stated that the album "provides a notable cross section of [Rutherford's] innovative skills through an almost 40-year time frame."

Chris Callaghan of the Morning Star described the album as "revelatory," and commented: "Many of Rutherford's qualities are there in the music of In Backward Times... His outrageous wit, the griot's stories in the solo improvising tracks, his revolutionary horn sound, his respect and comradeship with brilliant co-musicians... and the sheer collectivism and democratic principles that mark the music he made with others are all there."

== Track listing ==
1. "Duet for One" – 22:05
2. "Duet for Two" – 25:29
3. "Solo for One" – 18:06
4. "Trio Finale" – 10:00
- Track 1 was recorded on November 22, 1979, at the Teatro Auteo in Milano. Track 2 was recorded on August 27, 1988, at the Duke of Wellington in London. Track 3 was recorded on October 26, 2004, at the Petit Théâtre Mercelis in Brussels. Track 4 was recorded on May 7, 2007, at the Red Rose in London.

== Personnel ==
- Paul Rutherford – trombone (all tracks), electronics (track 1)
- Paul Rogers – bass (track 2)
- Marcio Mattos – cello (track 4)
- Veryan Weston – piano (track 4)
