= Tetralogy (album) =

Live album by Paul Rutherford
- Released: 2009
- Recorded: July 13, 1978; August 20 and 23, 1981; June 16, 1982
- Venue: London, Pisa
- Genre: Free jazz
- Length: 2:20:49
- Label: Emanem; 5202
- Producer: Martin Davidson

Paul Rutherford chronology
Solo in Berlin 1975 (2007)	Tetralogy (2009)	Raahe '99 (2012)

Tetralogy is a two-CD live album by trombonist Paul Rutherford. Drawn from archival tapes, it was recorded in 1978, 1981, and 1982, in London and Pisa, and was released in 2009 by Emanem Records. The album presents Rutherford in a variety of contexts: two solos, one with electronics, and one without; a brass quartet that features trombonist George E. Lewis, French hornist Martin Mayes, and tubist Melvyn Poore; and a trio with bassist Paul Rogers and drummer Nigel Morris.

== Reception ==
Professional ratings
Review scores
Source	Rating
All About Jazz	4.5/5 stars
The Free Jazz Collective	3.5/5 stars

In a review for All About Jazz, John Eyles called the album "One of 2009's very best," and stated that the tracks "give a good impression of Rutherford's talents and the breadth of his musical vision... Listening to this moving music, it is like he is still with us."

Troy Collins of Point of Departure wrote: "these sessions detail how the trombonist incorporated innovative techniques, a distilled knowledge of jazz idioms and humor to thoroughly creative ends."

A reviewer for The Free Jazz Collective called the recording "an interesting album for fans of Rutherford," and commented: "The non-electronic solo performance and the brass quartet alone would have made a great record. Now, it sounds more like a collection, rather than a unified listening experience."

Writing for Paris Transatlantic, Nate Dorward described the solo set without electronics as "prime-cut," and remarked: "The density of event is extraordinary, the ideas cut into each other at a bruisingly rapid clip and every so often squashed down in half-strangled protestations, as Rutherford spars joyously with the quirky amplifying properties of his surroundings."

== Track listing ==
CD 1

1. "Elesol A" – 17:56
2. "Elesol B" – 8:17
3. "Elesol C" – 6:39
4. "Braqua 1A" – 23:44
5. "Braqua 1B" – 6:36
6. "Braqua 2" – 12:47
- Tracks 1–3 were recorded in London on August 20, 1981. Tracks 4–6 were recorded in London on August 23, 1981.

CD 2

1. "The Great Leaning 1A" – 11:30
2. "The Great Leaning 1B" – 15:22
3. "The Great Leaning 2" – 10:58
4. "One First 1" – 8:10
5. "One First 2" – 6:08
6. "One First 3" – 11:49
- Tracks 1–3 were recorded in Pisa on July 13, 1978. Tracks 4–6 were recorded in London on June 16, 1982.

== Personnel ==
- Paul Rutherford – trombone, euphonium, electronics, voice, tambourine
- George E. Lewis – trombone (disc 1, tracks 4–6)
- Martin Mayes – French horn (disc 1, tracks 4–6)
- Melvyn Poore – tuba (disc 1, tracks 4–6)
- Paul Rogers – double bass (disc 2, tracks 4–6)
- Nigel Morris – drums (disc 2, tracks 4–6)
