= Joe Gallivan =

American musician (born 1937)

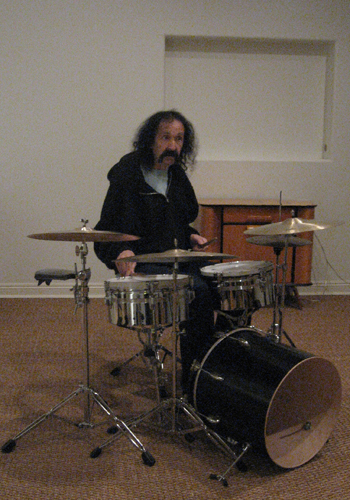
Joe Gallivan in 2011

Joe Gallivan (born August 9, 1937, Rochester, New York) is an American jazz and avant-garde musician. He plays drums, percussion and synthesizer.

== Career ==
Gallivan's first professional experience came at the age of 15 while in Miami. He played early on with Eduardo Chavez, Art Mooney and Charlie Spivak, as well as with the Modern Jazz Orchestra. He attended the University of Miami and then moved to New York in 1961, where he had a big band with Donald Byrd that featured Eric Dolphy, Pepper Adams, Don Ellis, Johnny Coles, Julius Watkins, and Duke Pearson. During the next year, he returned to Miami, conducted for the TV show Music U.S.A., and led the band A Train of Thought. In the 1960s he became interested in electronic music and musique concrète and began meeting with Vladimir Ussachevsky. He helped test the drum system developed by Robert Moog which Gallivan used on the 1974 Gil Evans album There Comes a Time.

Gallivan worked in the 1970s with saxophonist Charles Austin and three years with Larry Young in their band Love Cry Want. ("Love Cry Want" is also the title of the group's 1972 recording that was released in 1997 by Gallivan's label Newjazz). Gallivan moved to Europe in 1976. In London he was considered a replacement for Robert Wyatt in the band Soft Machine but did not end up joining the group, instead collaborating with its former members Elton Dean and Hugh Hopper. They formed a quartet with Keith Tippett for the 1976–77 albums Cruel but Fair and Mercy Dash. While living in Frankfurt in the 1980s, Gallivan worked with Albert Mangelsdorff, Heinz Sauer, and Christoph Lauer.

In 1989 Gallivan returned to the U.S., living in Hawaii. In London he recorded the album Innocence with Elton Dean and Evan Parker. He performed at Ronnie Scott's Club in London with Brian Cuomo on piano and Jackie Ryan on vocals. In 1998, Gallivan recorded Electric/Electronic/Electric in the trio Powerfield with keyboardist Pat Thomas and guitarist Gary Smith and Gallivan/Smith with Gary Smith. During the same year he recorded Des del silenci in Barcelona with the Ektal Ensemble, including trumpeter Benet Palet, percussionist Marti Perramon, and Gnawan quartet Nas Marrakech featuring vocalist Abdel-Jahlil Koddsi. In 2000 he performed at the Bell Atlantic Jazz Festival in New York City in his band the Rainforest Initiative with Dean, Parker, Charles Austin, John McMinn, Marcio Mattos, Lei'ohu Ryder, and Mahalani Po'epo'e. This performance was recorded and broadcast on the Black Entertainment Network.

He recorded the live album Vienna with bassist Paul Rogers and Indian violinist Anupriya Deotale and LA with Benn Clatworthy. In 2011 Gallivan was the sole surviving member of the 1970s band Love Cry Want. He recorded a new Love Cry Want album with guitarist Tom McNalley and bassist Michelle Webb.

== Discography ==
- Modern Jazz Orchestra featuring Kenny Drew, Joe Gallivan, Don Vincent (Addess) (re-issued on CD in 2001 by V.S.O.P. Records)
- At Last (Man Made) Charles Austin, Joe Gallivan (released as CD in 2000)
- Mindscapes (Spitball) Charles Austin, Joe Gallivan (released as CD in 2000)
- Expressions to the Winds (Spitball) Charles Austin, Joe Gallivan (also CD in 2000)
- Cruel But Fair (Compendium) with Hugh Hopper, Elton Dean, Keith Tippet, Joe Gallivan (reissued on CD by One Way)
- Peace on Earth (Compendium) with Charles Austin, Joe Gallivan, John McMinn, Carmen Lundy, David Deluca, Al Richardson, Marvis Martin, London
- Intercontinental Express with Joe Gallivan, Charles Austin, Kenny Wheeler, Nick Evans, Jeff Green, Elton Dean, Ronnie Scott, Ian Hamer, Roy Babbington, Toni Cook, Stephen Wick.
- The Cheque Is in the Mail (Ogun) Kenny Wheeler, Elton Dean, Joe Gallivan
- Home from Home (Ogun) Charles Austin, Roy Babbington, Joe Gallivan
- Mercy Dash (Atmospheres) Hugh Hopper, Elton Dean, Keith Tippet, Joe Gallivan (reissued on CD by Culture Press)
- There Comes a Time (RCA) Gil Evans and his Orchestra
- And Around (Colin) Jean Schwarz, Charles Austin, Joe Gallivan
- Surroundings (Celia) Jean Schwarz, Charles Austin, Joe Gallivan
- Miami (Atmosphere) Charles Austin, Joe Gallivan
- The New Orchestra (Hannibal) Charles Austin, Joe Gallivan, Ryo Kawasaki, Clive Stevens, Peter Ponzol, George Bishop, Gene Golden, Sabu Morales, Wendell Hayes, Tadashi Yasunaga
- Voices (Hannibal) Joe Gallivan, Charles Austin, John McMinn, Earl Lloyd
- Supply and Demand (Rykodisc) Dagmar Krause, Richard Thompson, John Harle, Danny Thompson, Joe Gallivan
- Mysterious Planet (Hannibal) Charles Austin, Joe Gallivan, John McMinn, Nelson Padron, Earl Lloyd
- Prism (Vinyl) Peter Ponzol, Abbey Rader, Joe Gallivan
- Innocence (Cadence) Joe Gallivan with Guy Barker, Elton Dean, Claude Deppa, Jim Dvorak, Marcio Mattos, Neil Metcalf, Evan Parker, Gerard Presencer, Paul Rutherford, Ashley Slater
- Night Vision (Newjazz.com) Brian Cuomo, Joe Gallivan
- The Origin of Man (Newjazz.com) Elton Dean, Brian Cuomo, Joe Gallivan
- Surrender (newjazz.com) Jackie Ryan, Brian Cuomo, Joe Gallivan
- Love Cry Want (newjazz.com) Larry Young, Joe Gallivan, Nicholas
- Orchestral Meditations (newjazz.com) Charles Austin, Joe Gallivan, John McMinn
- Timeless (newjazz.com) Charles Austin, Joe Gallivan, John McMinn, Gene Argel, Brian Cuomo, Hector Serrano
- Guitars on Mars (Virgin) Larry Young, Nicholas, Joe Gallivan
- Wiretapper (November 1998), Powerfield (Joe Gallivan, Gary Smith, Pat Thomas)
- Des del silenci (Afro-Blue) Ektal Ensemble
- Electronic/Electric/Electronic (Paratactile) Powerfield (Joe Gallivan, Gary Smith, Pat Thomas)
- Joe Gallivan/Gary Smith (Paratactile) Joe Gallivan, Gary Smith
- Live at Ronnie Scott's (Ronnie Scott's) Joe Gallivan, Jackie Ryan, Brian Cuomo
- Powerfield (2006) Powerfield (Joe Gallivan, Gary Smith, Pat Thomas)
- Vienna (2007) Rainforest Initiative (Joe Gallivan, Paul Rogers, Anupriya)
- LA (2010) Joe Gallivan, Benn Clatworthy
- Neon Lighthouse 84 (2010) Joe Gallivan, Tony Moore (a.k.a. P.Y. Caplin)
- Love Cry Want - Lizard Below (2011) Joe Gallivan, Tom McNalley, Michelle Webb
- Europe (2014) Joe Gallivan with Charles Austin, Elton Dean, Pat Thomas, Gary Smith, Jim Dvorak, Claude Deppa, Guy Barker
- New Morning for the World (2021) Joe Gallivan, Brian Cuomo, John Zangrando

=== Radio broadcasts ===
- 1977 Chateau Vallon Festival in Toulon, France: Intercontinental Express Big Band
- 1977 Danish Radio: Live at Club Montmartre
- 1977 Radio Bremen: Live at Stadt Theatre in Bremen
- 1977 Radio France: Recorded broadcast with Charles Austin
- 1977 Radio France: Two sessions with Elton Dean, Keith Tippett, and Hugh Hopper
- 1978 Espace Cardin: Live broadcast with Charles Austin and big band from Paris
- 1980 Radio France: two broadcasts with French composer Jean Schwarz and Charles Austin
- 1981 France Musique: Live broadcast
- 1982 France Musique: Live broadcast with Peter Ponzol
- 1983 Hessischer Rundfunk Jazz Ensemble broadcast
- 1985 BBC Radio 3: with Elton Dean
- 1985 Hessischer Rundfunk Jazz Ensemble broadcast
- 1986 BBC Radio 3: Soldiers of the Road Big Band
- 1986 BBC Radio 3: with John Corbett
- 1986 Hessischer Rundfunk Jazz Ensemble broadcast with John Schroeder
- 1987 BBC Radio 3: duo with Evan Parker
- 1987 France Musique with Nicholas
- 1987 Public TV, Miami, Florida: One hour show with Charles Austin
- 1992 BBC Radio 1: Quartet with Paul Rutherford, Jim Dvorak, Marcio Mattos
- 1992 BBC Radio 1: Soldiers of the Road Big Band at the London Jazz Festival
- 2000 BBC Radio 3: Powerfield (Joe Gallivan, Gary Smith, Pat Thomas)
- 2000 Black Entertainment Network broadcasts the Rainforest Initiative
- 2001 ORF radio (Vienna): Ektal Ensemble at Festival Schnittpunkte
- 2003 ORF television (Vienna): Joe Gallivan and DJ Orgasmus
- 2004 Orange Internet Radio (Austria): Rainforest 21
