= The First Full Turn =

Live album by RoTToR
- Released: 1998
- Recorded: February 6, 1998; April 30, 1998
- Venue: St Giles Cripplegate, London; Theatre P Scarron, Le Mans
- Genre: Free jazz
- Length: 1:07:26
- Label: Emanem; 4026
- Producer: Martin Davidson

Paul Rutherford chronology
Sequences 72 & 73 (1997)	The First Full Turn (1998)	Trombolenium (2002)

The First Full Turn is a live album by the free improvisation group known as RoTToR, featuring trombonist Paul Rutherford, vocalist Julie Tippett, pianist Keith Tippett, and bassist Paul Rogers. The bulk of the album, a long quartet track, was recorded on April 30, 1998, at Theatre P Scarron in Le Mans, France. A remaining solo trombone track was recorded on February 6, 1998, at St Giles Cripplegate in London. The album was released by Emanem Records later that year.

The group was originally a trio named RoToR, with the capital letters corresponding to the first letter of each player's last name. When Julie Tippett joined, the name was changed to RoTToR.

== Reception ==
Professional ratings
Review scores
Source	Rating
AllMusic	3/5 stars
The Penguin Guide to Jazz	3/4 stars

In a review for AllMusic, François Couture called the recording "beautiful," and praised "the chemistry between the Tippetts."

Regarding the long quartet track, Robert Spencer of All About Jazz commented: "It is a tremendous, fascinating performance from beginning to end, showing off not only Rutherford's tremendous coloristic and improvisational ability, but also the considerable skills of Julie Tippett." Concerning the solo track, he remarked: "Rutherford has a huge range of expression on his trombone: he can match Roswell Rudd's smears and wails just as easily as J. J. Johnson's smooth precision. By the nature of the case he tends more toward the former than the latter, but he has such a range of expression that he never fails to hold interest."

Writing for Metropolis, Richard Cochrane stated: "nothing hangs around for long in this group; blink and, as ever, it's gone... When the sparks fly, it's exciting music indeed."

== Track listing ==
1. "The First Full Turn" (Julie Tippett, Keith Tippett, Paul Rogers, Paul Rutherford) – 53:09
2. "Another Solo Turn" (Paul Rutherford) – 12:27

== Personnel ==
- Paul Rutherford – trombone, voice
- Julie Tippett – voice, thumb piano (track 1)
- Keith Tippett – piano, bells, maracas (track 1)
- Paul Rogers – double bass (track 1)
