= Iskra 1903 =

Studio album live by Paul Rutherford, Derek Bailey and Barry Guy
- Released: 1972
- Recorded: 2 September 1970 and 3 May 1972
- Venue: Institute of Contemporary Arts and Colourtone Studios, London, England
- Genre: Free jazz
- Label: Incus 3/4

Iskra 1903 chronology
| Iskra 1903 (1972) | Iskra Nckpa 1903 (1995) |

Chapter One 1970–1972

Iskra 1903 is the debut album by the group of the same name, featuring trombonist Paul Rutherford, guitarist Derek Bailey and bassist Barry Guy which was recorded at the Institute of Contemporary Arts in 1970 and in a studio in 1972 and first released as a double album on the Incus label then as a triple CD box set entitled Chapter One 1970–1972 on Emanem in 2000 with additional material.

== Reception ==
Professional ratings
Review scores
| Source | Rating |
|---|---|
| AllMusic | 5/5 stars |
| The Penguin Guide to Jazz | 4/4 stars |

The AllMusic review by Steve Loewy called it "some of the best free music ever recorded" and states "What makes this so special is the opportunity to see the music unfold. No two tracks are the same, as Rutherford, Bailey, and Guy play each piece with the revolutionary fervor of a new discovery. Nearly every minute sounds fresh and exciting".

The authors of the Penguin Guide to Jazz Recordings awarded Chapter One: 1970–1972 4 stars, and commented: "Iskra 1903 represent a wonderfully challenging auditory experience. So densely interwoven are the lines and so convincingly vocalized is Rutherford's tone that one almost feels one is listening to a passionate discourse."

Raul Da Gama stated: "Here, even in the trio's most savage and turbulent pages is playing of an awesome clarity and poise... as you listen to the music unfold, you also hear an astonishingly deft and assured dismissal of every difficulty on the prose and the poetry of this music. Such is the majesty of the intertwining of trombone, guitar and bass that the trio appears to set wild seas in uproar with unfaltering command and daunting versatility."

Robert Spencer of All About Jazz noted that the album "contains a great deal that beguiles and fascinates," and wrote: "There is... no narrative flow as such to this music; rather, it progresses by the creation of evanescent soundscapes that vanish almost as quickly as they appear... to isolate them is to try to catch a snowflake and frame it... this is a superabundance of gripping music that amply rewards close listening."

Writing for Metropolis, Richard Cochrane stated that the music "sounds as brilliant and alive as ever," and remarked: "this trio seems to love space above all, and although the three play with commitment and more than a little bite, the silence into which they propel their revolutionary sounds sets them off and makes the music simultaneously relaxed and uncomfortable."

In an article for The Wire, Philip Clark wrote: "Iskra 1903 is still noticeably ahead of anyone's idea of the music... Where does Bailey's guitar end and Guy's bass begin? Where indeed! Guy's bowed roars and his tickled, spanked notes are a jagged bass counterpoint to Bailey – space mapped out for Rutherford's melting-moment melodies and deconstructed tailgates."

Musician and writer Henry Kuntz described the recording as "a set of near telepathic trio improvisations, music which, when it is finally heard, is likely to be returned to and studied for some time to come."

== Track listing ==
All compositions by Paul Rutherford, Derek Bailey and Barry Guy.

=== Double LP ===
Side one

1. "Improvisation 1" - 20:15

Side two

1. "Improvisation 2" - 5:40
2. "Improvisation 3" - 11:47
3. "Improvisation 4" - 5:12

Side three

1. "Improvisation 5" - 5:57
2. "Improvisation 6" - 10:37
3. "Improvisation 7" - 4:29

Side four

1. "Improvisation 8" - 6:22
2. "Improvisation 9" - 3:38
3. "Improvisation 10" - 3:10
4. "Improvisation 11" - 7:35

Note

- Recorded on 2 September 1970 at the Institute of Contemporary Arts (Sides 1 & 2) and on 3 May 1972 at Colourtone Studios, London, England (Sides 3 & 4)

=== Triple CD ===
Disc one

1. "Improvisation 1" - 21:03
2. "Improvisation 2" - 5:37
3. "Improvisation 3" - 11:36
4. "Improvisation 4" - 5:04
5. "Improvisation 0" - 25:20 Previously unreleased

Disc two

1. "Offcut 1" - 1:40 Previously unreleased
2. "Offcut 2" - 4:25 Previously unreleased
3. "Offcut 3" - 11:17 Previously unreleased
4. "Improvisation 5" - 5:54
5. "Improvisation 6" - 10:48
6. "Improvisation 7" - 4:29
7. "Improvisation 8" - 6:21
8. "Improvisation 9" - 3:39
9. "Improvisation 10" - 3:09
10. "Improvisation 11" - 7:34

Disc three

1. "Extra 1" - 7:47
2. "Extra 2" - 11:31
3. "Extra 3" - 6:42
4. "On Tour 1" - 13:37
5. "On Tour 3" - 12:44
6. "On Tour 2" - 12:34

Notes

- Recorded on 2 September 1970 at the Institute of Contemporary Arts (CD 1 & CD2: 1–3), unidentified location in 1971 (CD3: 1–3) on 3 May 1972 at Colourtone Studios, London, England (CD 2: 4–10), in Donaueshingen on 21 October 1972 (CD3: 4), in Bremen on 23 or 24 October 1972 (CD3: 6) and in Berlin on 1 November 1972 (CD3: 5).

== Personnel ==
- Paul Rutherford - trombone, piano
- Derek Bailey - guitar
- Barry Guy - bass, amplified bass
