= Hoxha (album) =

2005 live jazz album by Paul Rutherford

Live album by Paul Rutherford, Ken Vandermark, Torsten Müller, and Dylan van der Schyff
- Released: 2005
- Recorded: December 12, 2004
- Venue: Portland, Oregon
- Genre: Free jazz
- Length: 1:03:18
- Label: Spool; SPL126

Paul Rutherford chronology
Iskra³ (2005)	Hoxha (2005)	The Zone (2006)

Hoxha is a live album by the free improvisation group of the same name, featuring trombonist Paul Rutherford, saxophonist Ken Vandermark, bassist Torsten Müller, and drummer Dylan van der Schyff. It was recorded on December 12, 2004, in Portland, Oregon, and was released in 2005 by the Spool label as part of their Line series.

According to Vandermark, the group performed four or five concerts in Canada and the U.S., prior to which he had not played with Rutherford or van der Schyff. (The 2018 release titled Are We in Diego?, recorded two days earlier, features the same lineup.) He reflected: "for me it was really walking into a brand new situation each night. Part of that meant, well what can the group be about? What can we do, what do we play, how do we change?" Regarding the group's approach to free improvisation, he reflected: "the music changes a lot from performance to performance and I believe it should, otherwise the people involved aren't really trying to improvise. So there are people taking risks, musical chances and whatnot, if they're really pushing themselves."

== Reception ==
Professional ratings
Review scores
Source	Rating
AllMusic	4/5 stars
The Penguin Guide to Jazz	4/4 stars
Tom Hull – on the Web	B+

In a review for AllMusic, François Couture wrote: "The trombonist is in good shape, throwing in strong exchanges, especially with Vandermark's tenor sax and Müller, but the album's best moments happen with the whole group in full motion... Rutherford has been documented more in solo or very small settings in the early 2000s, but he remains a keenly discerning group player, as this finely recorded release demonstrates."

The authors of The Penguin Guide to Jazz Recordings awarded the album a full 4 stars, calling it "one of Rutherford's best group outings of recent times," and stating: "What's most interesting is the trombonist's use of widely varied dynamics. The closing 'Rokurokubi' is extremely quiet, packed at times with soft, almost toneless sounds. Other tracks are frenetic in pace, but there is never a moment when control seems to be lost."

Ken Waxman of JazzWord praised Rutherford's "fearless technique and casual joy," and noted that, on the album, there is "no hierarchical suggestions or Old master – young apprentices separateness here, even though Müller, the next oldest musicians is almost a decade and a half younger than the British trombonist. Instead what's most apparent is a sense of these improvisations being in the moment." He concluded that Hoxha "prove[s] the adage that old trombonists – unlike dogs – can learn new tricks – and get along well enough with musical puppies to pass on their own capers."

== Track listing ==
1. "King Ghidora" – 11:54
2. "Iris" – 12:18
3. "Angilas" – 4:01
4. "Baragon" – 21:07
5. "Dagahra" – 9:05
6. "Rokurokubi" – 4:53

== Personnel ==
- Paul Rutherford – trombone
- Ken Vandermark – tenor saxophone, clarinet
- Torsten Müller – bass
- Dylan van der Schyff – drums
