= Are We in Diego? =

2018 live jazz album

Live album by Paul Rutherford, Ken Vandermark, Torsten Müller, and Dylan van der Schyff
- Released: 2018
- Recorded: December 10, 2004
- Venues: The Ironworks, Vancouver, Canada
- Genre: Free jazz
- Labels: WhirrbooM! Records; 003; Catalytic Sound

Paul Rutherford chronology
| In Backward Times (2017) | Are We in Diego? (2018) |

Are We in Diego? is a live album by trombonist Paul Rutherford, saxophonist Ken Vandermark, bassist Torsten Müller, and drummer Dylan van der Schyff. It was recorded on December 10, 2004, at the Ironworks in Vancouver, Canada, and was released in 2018 by WhirrbooM! Records and Catalytic Sound.

According to Vandermark, the group performed four or five concerts in Canada and the U.S., prior to which he had not played with Rutherford or van der Schyff. (The 2005 release titled Hoxha, recorded two days later, features the same lineup.) He reflected: "for me it was really walking into a brand new situation each night. Part of that meant, well what can the group be about? What can we do, what do we play, how do we change?" Regarding the group's approach to free improvisation, he reflected: "the music changes a lot from performance to performance and I believe it should, otherwise the people involved aren't really trying to improvise. So there are people taking risks, musical chances and whatnot, if they're really pushing themselves."

The album is dedicated to Rutherford, who died in 2007.

== Reception ==
Professional ratings
Review scores
| Source | Rating |
|---|---|
| The Free Jazz Collective | 4.5/5 stars |

In a review for The Free Jazz Collective, Nick Metzger wrote: "This set finds Rutherford in good company, playing the music he loved to an audience appreciative of his art. It's a fitting tribute and a marvelous album besides."

George W. Harris of Jazz Weekly stated: "The team stretches out for twenty minutes on the extroverted and exploratory 'Morning Star' while the title track has some explosive moments on the trombone. There are then four short and concise excursions, mixing freedom and inquisitive moods, making for thoughtful and attentive listening."

Downtown Music Gallery's Bruce Lee Gallanter commented: "This is a true international quartet with each member from a different background. Yet by listening, what we hear is the way they work together... The overall sound here is that Euro style free music at its best. Focused, ever-changing and filled with surprising twists and turns. Consistently excellent."

== Track listing ==
Track timings not provided.

1. "Morning Star"
2. "Are We in Diego Yet?"
3. "Venceremos"
4. "The World's Biggest Playboy"
5. "Dinsdale"
6. "Bis Später"

== Personnel ==
- Paul Rutherford – trombone
- Ken Vandermark – tenor saxophone, clarinet
- Torsten Müller – bass
- Dylan van der Schyff – drums
