= Roger Turner (musician) =

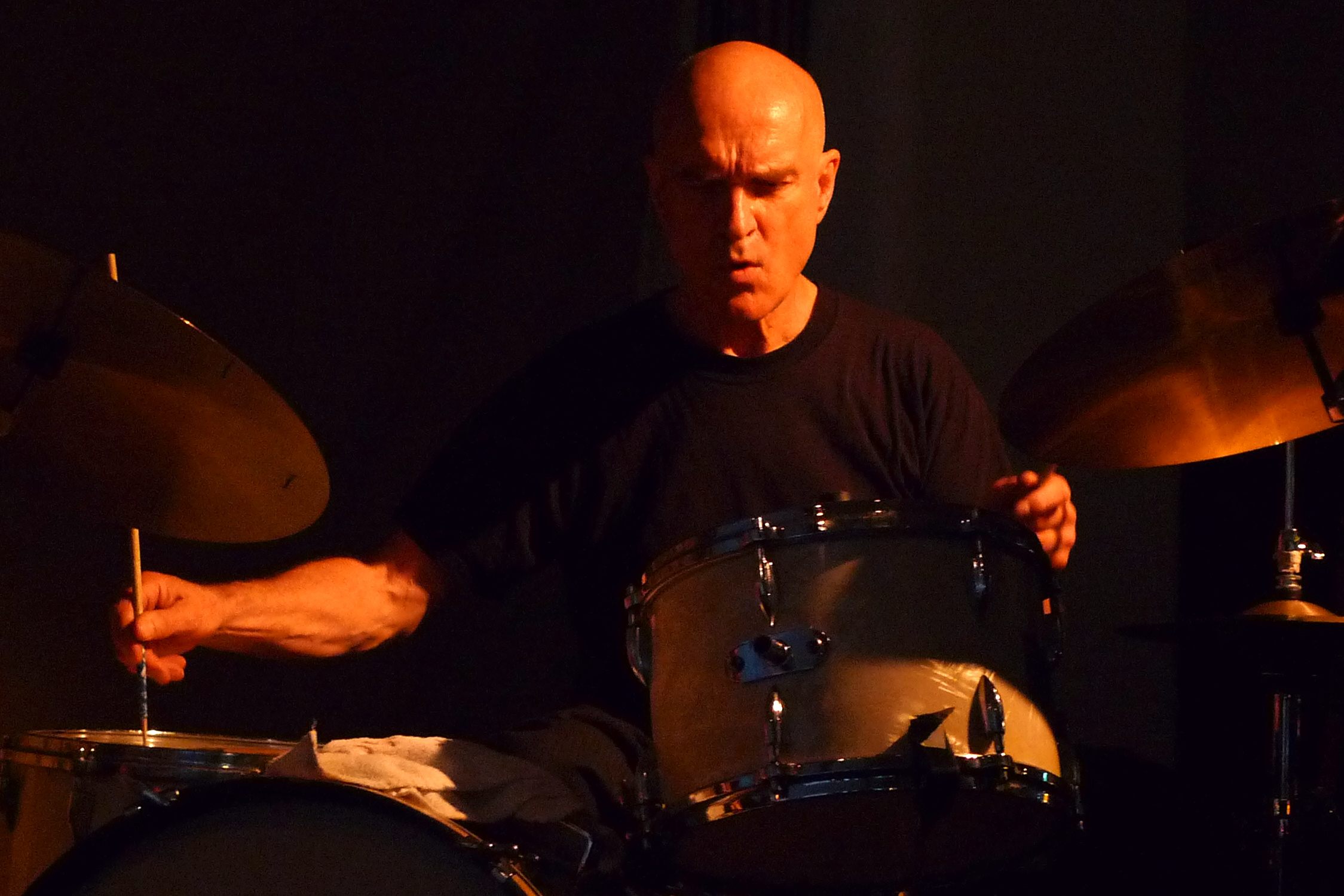
- Roger Turner at Cafe Oto (London), July 2011.

Background information
- Born: 1946 (age 79–80); Whitstable, England
- Genre: Jazz
- Occupation: Percussionist
- Website: www.turners-site.com

Roger Turner (born 1946, Whitstable, England) is an English jazz percussionist. He plays the drumset, drums, and various percussion, and was brought up into the jazz and visual art cultures inhabited by his older brothers, playing drums from childhood in informal jazz contexts.

== Career ==
Turner studied English literature and contemporary philosophy at Sussex University, playing with Chris Biscoe for the British Council in 1968, a first concert in improvisation. His move to London gave him contact with the first and second generation improvisers and he began to play primarily with Lol Coxhill, Gary Todd, John Russell, Hugh Davies, Steve Beresford, and Phil Minton.

In the years immediately after 1974 his work was primarily concentrated on opening the way to a more personal percussion language. This was also a period of intense collaborations that structured many of his future approaches to music-making and saw the formation of two long-lasting acoustic duos with Phil Minton and with John Russell. Recordings of these duos document an extreme attention to timbre and pitch, as well as a constantly shifting speed that typified much of his work at the time. The duo with Minton toured extensively throughout Europe, USA and Canada. They also perform together in the 1993 opera Agamemnon.

In 1979 he established CAW records with John Russell and Anthony Wood, and recorded the solo album The Blur Between focussing on single surface improvisations: a linear and reduced equipment approach he had started using with Carlos Zingaro and others in live performances.

In addition to forming Trump music with Gary Todd to promote improvised music in London, he also involved himself in formative activities of the London Musicians Collective during this period. He was awarded Arts Council of Great Britain bursaries for solo percussion in 1980, and in 1983 for investigation into percussion with electronics. Extensive festival and club solo work followed, including the Bracknell Jazz Festival and the Brussels Festival of Percussion.

In 1982 the trio The Recedents was formed with Lol Coxhill and Mike Cooper exploring the possibilities of electro-acoustic music, in which Turner initially played drumset and EMS Synthi A as a means of bending the sounds of various metal percussion instruments. This group, still existing, mixes song, jazz, punk/thrash, with acoustic detail in always shifting sonorities, and has worked throughout Europe, Canada and the UK, also recording for the French Nato label. Involvements with experimental rock musics and open-form song included extensive work in duo with Annette Peacock 1983-5, with whom he toured in Europe and Scandinavia. They recorded the album I have no feelings for Ironic.

In 1984-5, he was invited for workshop residences at Alan Silva's Institute Art Culture Perception in Paris, where long-term collaborations with Alan began, culminating in The Tradition Trio with Johannes Bauer. This group was central to his explorations of forms of free jazz, an interest that has seen him working with musicians on both sides of the Atlantic (including Elton Dean, Irene Schweizer, Cecil Taylor, Roy Campbell, Henry Grimes, The Wardrobe Trio and Charles Gayle).

Since the early 1980s his work has focussed on numerous projects with improvising musicians and groups, touring Europe, Australia, USA and Canada. Perhaps the most important of the later groups would be Konk Pack, formed in 1997, with Tim Hodgkinson and Thomas Lehn, a group whose use of volume and sense of detail continues the exploration of an electro-acoustic dynamic that forms one of his main musical concerns. This group has toured extensively in Europe and USA.

He forged working relationships with Japanese musicians over the years: in the 1980s with Toshinori Kondo in the trio with John Russell, but since the mid-1990s in concerts and recordings with guitarist Kazuhisa Uchihashi in Austria, Japan, and U.K, and in the recent (2009) Hana-Bi three-day event in London that included the guitarist and the pianist Chino Shuichi.

An active involvement in visual art has always been in dialogue with his music, and an inspiration for it. In the forefront of this is his work with Susan Turcot (the investigation/documentation of music and sound-drawing both in Europe and Canada—including the Being Rich box collection --, and music for her 2008 animation film Bitumen, Blood, and the Carbon Climb.

His music for dance/performance includes work with Alexander Frangenheim's Concepts of Doing, Stuttgart; Carlos Zingaro's Encontros projects in Lisbon and Macau; and most recently in the Josef Nadj production etc.etc. (premiered Vandeouvre, France, 2008) and which is a continuing involvement.

In March 2009 he was invited to travel and perform on the Arctic island Svalbard, and was also invited to attend and play in the Comprovise event in Cologne, Germany in June 2009, set up to examine any possible relationship between improvisation and composition.

Turner's music-making with international improvisers in ad hoc and group collaborations have since the 1970s to the present day included Toshinori Kondo, Derek Bailey, Fred Frith, Evan Parker, William Parker, Cecil Taylor, Otomo Yoshihide, Shelley Hirsch, Joelle Leandre, Keith Rowe, Ab Baars, Barry Guy, Barre Philips, Henry Grimes, Paul Rutherford, Gunter Christmann, Marilyn Crispell, Irene Schweizer, Frederik Rzewski, and Malcolm Goldstein.

== Discography ==
- Sunday Best, with Gary Todd (Incus, 1979)
- Artless Sky, with Toshinori Kondo, John Russell (Caw, 1980)
- The Blur Between (Caw)
- Cous Cous, with Lol Coxhill (Nato)
- Ammo, with Phil Minton (Leo)
- I have no feelings, with Annette Peacock (Ironic)
- Barbeque Strut, with The Recedents (Nato)
- Ruff, with Minton, Tomlinson, Davies (Leo)
- Several young men ignite, with The Nose Flutes (Reflex)
- Take Some Risks, with Alan Silva, Didier Petit (In Situ)
- Frogdance, with The Recedents (Impetus)
- Zombie Bloodbath, with The Recedents (Nato)
- Dada da, with Phil Minton (Leo, 1993)
- Mouthful of Ecstasy, with Minton Quartet (Victo)
- Birthdays, with John Russell (Emanem)
- In the Tradition, with Alan Silva & Johannes Bauer (In Situ)
- Per s.e., with Helge Hinteregger, Franz Hautzinger (Durian)
- Short in the UK, with Steve Beresford, Dennis Palmer, Bob Stagner (Incus)
- Recent Croaks, with Martin Klapper (Acta)
- Interplay, with Hugh Davies, John Russell (FMR)
- Junk Percussion, Solo recordings for sampling (Zero-g)
- Autism, with Hinteregger, Uchihashi Kazuhisa (Durian)
- Big Deep, Konk Pack (Grob)
- Umlaut, with Birgit Ulher, Ulli Phillipp (Nurnichtnur)
- The Boss, with Mathieu Chamagne, Franck Collot (Pink)
- The Second Sky, with John Russell (Emanem)
- Warp Out, Konk Pack (Grob)
- Screen, with Frangenheim, Yoshihide, Parkins, Leimgruber, Schurch, Newton (COD)
- Tone, Tradition Trio with Silva, Bauer (a11)
- Live at the Total Music Meeting, The New Flags with Xu, Fuchs (a11, 2003)
- Trap Street, with Tomlinson, Beresford (Emanem, 2003)
- Off Leash, Konk Pack (Grob)
- Drainage (double CD ), with Phil Minton (Emanem)
- I segnali della ritirata, with Sanna, Ricci (Burp, 2005)
- Number Nine, with John Oswald, Michael Keith (Emanem, 2006)
- Oche, with Christian Munthe (Kning Disc, 2007)
- Slur, with Phil Minton Quartet (Emanem, 2007)
- Scatter, with Thomas, Tucker, Minton (FMR)
- Goodbye Silence, The Articles with Thomas, Gustafsson (FMR)
- Wishing You Were Here (5-CD Box set), with The Recedents (Freeform Association)
- Over the Title, with Witold Oleszak (Freeform Association, 2012)
- Fragments of Parts, with Witold Oleszak (Freeform Association, 2013)
- The Last Train, with Otomo Yoshihide (Fataka, 2015)
- The Corner, with Fred Van Hove (Relative Pitch, 2017)
