= Take Some Risks =

Live album by Alan Silva
- Released: 1989
- Recorded: November 23, 1986
- Venue: La Galerie Maximilien Guiol, Paris
- Genre: Free jazz
- Label: In Situ; IS 011
- Producer: Didier Saire

Alan Silva chronology
My Country (1989)	Take Some Risks (1989)	In the Tradition (1996)

Take Some Risks is a live album by multi-instrumentalist Alan Silva. It was recorded in November 1986 at La Galerie Maximilien Guiol in Paris, and was released in 1989 by the French label In Situ. On the album, Silva, on double bass, is joined by clarinetist Misha Lobko, violinist Bruno Girard, cellist Didier Petit, and percussionist Roger Turner. Although the musicians knew each other well prior to the performance, it was their first appearance as a quintet.

== Reception ==
Professional ratings
Review scores
Source	Rating
AllMusic	3/5 stars
The Penguin Guide to Jazz	3/4 stars

In a review for AllMusic, François Couture called the album "a satisfying session, focused and highly intense," one that "takes the listener on a challenging but rewarding journey." He wrote: "Take Some Risks makes a fine album documenting a special meeting from a period that has been underrecorded."

The authors of the Penguin Guide to Jazz Recordings awarded the album 3 stars, and stated that it "features an ensemble that sounds very much like an extension of Silva's own musical personality."

Dan Warburton, writing for Paris Transatlantic, commented: "The album is aptly named — the music lurches forward with apparent abandon, a blind man walking a clifftop footpath: some of it is absolutely breathtaking, some of it fails... magnificently. Younger generations of improvisers who pore over master tapes in studios trying to mix out odd spots of trouble should go back and listen to this, have the courage of their convictions, and take some risks themselves."

== Track listing ==
1. "Standard Equipment: 1er Mouvement" (Silva) – 8:50
2. "Standard Equipment: 2ème Mouvement" (Girard) – 10:05
3. "Standard Equipment: 3ème Mouvement" (Lobko) – 18:12
4. "Standard Equipment: 4ème Mouvement" (Petit) – 8:25
5. "Some" (Turner) – 8:25

== Personnel ==
- Alan Silva – double bass
- Misha Lobko – clarinet
- Bruno Girard – violin
- Didier Petit – cello
- Roger Turner – percussion
