= Raahe '99 =

Raahe '99 (For Paul Rutherford)

Live album by Paul Rutherford and George Haslam with the Samuli Mikkonen Trio
- Released: 2012
- Recorded: July 31, 1999
- Venue: Raahen Rantajatsit (Jazz on the Beach) Festival, Raahe, Finland
- Genre: Free jazz
- Length: 53:00
- Label: Slam Productions; SLAMCD 328

Paul Rutherford chronology
Tetralogy (2009)	Raahe '99 (For Paul Rutherford) (2012)	The Conscience (2017)

Raahe '99 (For Paul Rutherford) is a live album by trombonist Paul Rutherford and saxophonist George Haslam on which they are accompanied by members of the Samuli Mikkonen Trio, featuring pianist Mikkonen, bassist Ulf Krokfors, and drummer Mika Kallio. Consisting of a single continuous set lasting nearly an hour, it was recorded on July 31, 1999, at the Raahen Rantajatsit (Jazz on the Beach) Festival in Raahe, Finland, and was released in 2012 by Slam Productions.

== Reception ==
Professional ratings
Review scores
Source	Rating
All About Jazz	3.5/5 stars
The Free Jazz Collective	4/5 stars

In a review for The Free Jazz Collective, Daniel Sorrells wrote: "Raahe '99 is a completely satisfying piece of music, and a damn lucky find. It's painful to think that a great capture like this might have been lost for good, spirited away along with one of its creators. Mr. Rutherford is greatly missed, but lives on in a most profound way through performances with peers like those on Raahe, searching musicians who bring out the best in each other."

The editors of The New York City Jazz Record featured the album as an "Unearthed Gem," and writer John Sharpe stated: "While the trombonist may be best known for his staggering solo records, he also contributed positively to any number of free and structured situations. This 53-minute freely extemporized set with its freebop approach neatly encapsulates both styles."

Nick Lea of Jazz Views described the album as "a musical conversation that embraces cultural and musical differences, bring all together in an extended piece that, like a meeting between old and new friends, has humour, depth and warmth in abundance. Paul Rutherford is greatly missed, and it is great to hear him once again on this excellent release."

== Track listing ==
1. "53 Minutes" – 53:00

== Personnel ==
- Paul Rutherford – trombone
- George Haslam – baritone saxophone, tárogató
- Samuli Mikkonen – piano
- Ulf Krokfors – double bass
- Mika Kallio – drums
