= A Hero's Welcome: Pieces for Rare Occasions =

Live album by Alan Silva and William Parker
- Released: 1999
- Recorded: March 6, 1998
- Venue: Context Studios, New York City
- Genre: Free jazz
- Label: Eremite Records; MTE017
- Producer: Michael Ehlers

Alan Silva chronology
| In the Tradition (1996) | A Hero's Welcome: Pieces for Rare Occasions (1999) | Transmissions (1999) |

A Hero's Welcome: Pieces for Rare Occasions is a live album by multi-instrumentalist Alan Silva and bassist William Parker. It was recorded in March 1998 at Context Studios in New York City, and was released in 1999 by Eremite Records.

== Reception ==
Professional ratings
Review scores
| Source | Rating |
|---|---|
| AllMusic | 4/5 stars |
| The Penguin Guide to Jazz | 3.5/4 stars |
| All About Jazz | 3.5/5 stars |

In a review for AllMusic, Steve Loewy wrote: "You might not expect such lushness from a duo of midi keyboard and acoustic string bass... but... this is music of considerable substance... Silva... has much to say. His artistry on midi is that of a painter using broad sweeps of the brush. Parker solidly complements the sounds, sometimes laying a floor and at others doing what he does best: surprising with leaps, grunts, and stretched strings, and extending the natural limits of his ax."

The authors of the Penguin Guide to Jazz Recordings awarded the album 3½ stars, calling it "a project of awesome power," and stating: "Silva... create[s] a body of sound that occupies a mid-territory between Duke Ellington or Charles Mingus and Edgard Varèse... Parker is... beyond reproach and beyond categorization."

Writing for All About Jazz, Michael McCaw described the album as "a beautifully detailed recording," and commented: "it feels as if this music was a pre-composed suite with the musicians allowed some latitude throughout... this is a landmark album... anyone interested in the prowess and abilities of William Parker as a bassist would be wise to seek it out."

== Track listing ==
Composed by Alan Silva and William Parker.

1. "I" – 8:25
2. "II" – 7:26
3. "III" – 6:50
4. "IV" – 9:24
5. "V" – 13:44

== Personnel ==
- Alan Silva – keyboards, piano
- William Parker – bass
