= Rogues (album) =

Live album by Paul Rutherford and Paul Rogers
- Released: 1996
- Recorded: November 11, 1988
- Venue: The Cannonball, Birmingham, England
- Genre: Free jazz
- Length: 1:18:45
- Label: Emanem; 4007
- Producer: Martin Davidson

Paul Rutherford chronology
| Gheim (1986) | Rogues (1996) | Sequences 72 & 73 (1997) |

Rogues is a live album by trombonist Paul Rutherford and bassist Paul Rogers. Featuring two duets plus a solo for each musician, it was recorded on November 11, 1988, at the Cannonball, a pub in Birmingham, England, and was released in 1996 by Emanem Records.

== Reception ==
Professional ratings
Review scores
| Source | Rating |
|---|---|
| AllMusic | 3/5 stars |
| The Penguin Guide to Jazz | 3/4 stars |
| The Encyclopedia of Popular Music | 3/5 stars |

In a review for AllMusic, François Couture wrote: "The concert took place in a Birmingham pub: glasses, coughing, and cash register sounds surface when the intensity level of the music falls down. Since the players always remain on top of these intrusions, the resulting atmosphere actually works for the music: it puts the listener back into the room." He also praised Rogers' solo, describing it as an "impersonation of a classical bassist gradually going mad."

The authors of The Penguin Guide to Jazz Recordings noted that the album features two thirds of the trio that also included drummer Nigel Morris. (This lineup appeared on the 1986 album Gheim.) They commented: "The opening 'Rogues 1' is as riveting as it must have been on that night. The rest of the disc is less compelling."

== Track listing ==
1. "Rogues 1" – 39:45
2. "Rogue Bass" – 9:20
3. "Rogue Trombone" – 8:21
4. "Rogues 2" – 21:01

== Personnel ==
- Paul Rutherford – trombone (tracks 1, 3, 4)
- Paul Rogers – bass (tracks 1, 2, 4)
