= The Conscience =

Live album by Paul Rutherford and Sabu Toyozumi
- Released: 2017
- Recorded: October 11, 1999
- Venue: Café Jumbo, Tokoname, Aichi, Japan
- Genre: Free jazz
- Label: NoBusiness Records; NBLP 102 / NBCD 99
- Producer: Danas Mikailionis, Takeo Suetomi

Paul Rutherford chronology
Raahe '99 (2012)	The Conscience (2017)	In Backward Times (2017)

The Conscience is a live album by trombonist Paul Rutherford and drummer Sabu Toyozumi. It was recorded on October 11, 1999, at Café Jumbo in Tokoname, Aichi, Japan, and was released in 2017 by NoBusiness Records as part of their Chap Chap series, created in collaboration with the Japanese label of the same name.

== Reception ==
Professional ratings
Review scores
Source	Rating
The Free Jazz Collective	3.5/5 stars
All About Jazz	3/5 stars
All About Jazz	3.5/5 stars
Tom Hull – on the Web	A−

In a review for The Free Jazz Collective, Nicola Negri called the album "a prime example of free music at its most daring, an ever-changing musical landscape where the only constant is surprise," and wrote: "building on a common language based on free jazz, while pointing to even more abstract territories, the musicians demonstrate an immediate understanding of each other's playing, building on an urgent, unrelenting exchange of ideas... the richness of timbres and dynamics explored by the musicians guarantees the strong involvement of the listener, called to decipher the intricacies of their improvisational dialogue, its contradictions and mysterious flow."

Dusted Magazine's Michael Rosenstein stated: "Toyozumi and Rutherford prove to be superb partners for each other... there is a constant volley of ideas between the two... The two dive in, know how to leave space for each other, and know how to wrap things to effective closure."

John Sharpe of All About Jazz praised Rutherford's "abstract melodicism and burnished sound," incorporating "long buzzing lines, astonishingly nimble leaps into the upper registers and growling multiphonics," as well as Toyozumi's tendency to "creat[e] light amid the thunderous shade through the tone color play of clanging gongs and sizzling cymbals."

Writing for JazzWord, Ken Waxman commented: "Simpatico from the beginning, Rutherford and Toyozumi establish a mutually acceptable groove and exploit it throughout... the drummer sets up a continuum from which Rutherford's can dig deeper into his horn's innards to produce multiphonic vibrations with tones seemingly reflecting the metal as much as air and movement."

== Track listing ==
1. "The Conscience" – 23:56
2. "Beer, Beer and Beer" – 8:37
3. "Dear Ho Chi Mihn" – 10:03
4. "I Miss my Pet Rakkyo" – 9:42
5. "Song for Sadamu Hisada" – 17:52

== Personnel ==
- Paul Rutherford – trombone
- Sabu Toyozumi – drums
