= Sequences 72 & 73 =

Studio album by Paul Rutherford and Iskra 1912
- Released: 1997
- Recorded: September 20, 1972; October 19 and 26, 1973; May 13, 1974
- Studio: London
- Genre: Free jazz
- Label: Emanem; 4018

Paul Rutherford chronology
Rogues (1996)	Sequences 72 & 73 (1997)	The First Full Turn (1998)

Sequences 72 & 73 is an album by trombonist Paul Rutherford and the group known as Iskra 1912. It was recorded during 1972–1974 in London, and was released in 1997 by Emanem Records. The album features studio recordings of two ensemble works composed and conducted by Rutherford, plus a live recording of a solo trombone piece.

The solo trombone track, titled "Non-sequence," is an excerpt from an event that author Ben Watson described as having "entered Free Improvisation folklore as an inspirational example of musicianly rebellion," in that it involved a performance of Luciano Berio's composition Sequenza V during which Rutherford "began by following the score, then took off on his own." Watson wrote: "Applause and favourable reviews showed that no one – least of all the 'experts' – could tell that the genius on show was Rutherford's rather than Berio's."

== Reception ==
Professional ratings
Review scores
Source	Rating
AllMusic	4.5/5 stars
The Penguin Guide to Jazz	3/4 stars

In a review for AllMusic, Steve Loewy stated that the two ensemble pieces "are among the finest examples of free jazz composing for a large group," noting that "it helps to have virtuoso performers." He wrote: "the changing textures, organically developed harmonies, and meticulously composed structures lay a wonderful framework for the soloists."

The authors of The Penguin Guide to Jazz Recordings called the album a "historic release, a first chance to hear Rutherford's work as a composer/conductor," and commented: "With no drummer, there is no definite pulse and, as so often in Rutherford's music, it is the human voice, wordless on this occasion, which provides the unifying principle."

Walter Horn of Cadence described the recording as "a killer album" with "moments of intense beauty," and remarked: "Much of 'Sequence 72' and most of 'Sequence 73' are flying quilts of multi-colored sonorities that will transport any listener with the courage to climb aboard."

Regarding the solo trombone track, Ben Watson wrote: "The trombonist completely inhabits his soundmaking, pursuing an expressionist continuity familiar from free-jazz saxophonists since Albert Ayler. The use of vocalese, harmonics and bubbling saliva contribute to its guttural animality."

== Track listing ==
Composed by Paul Rutherford.

1. "Sequence 72" – 25:31
2. "Non-sequence" – 4:19
3. "Sequence 73" – 27:15
- Track 1 recorded on September 20, 1972. Track 2 recorded on May 13, 1974. Track 3 recorded on October 19 and 26, 1973. All tracks recorded in London.

== Personnel ==
- Paul Rutherford – conductor (tracks 1 and 3), trombone (track 2)
- Evan Parker – soprano saxophone, tenor saxophone (tracks 1 and 3)
- Trevor Watts – alto saxophone, soprano saxophone (track 1)
- Dave White – bass clarinet, contrabass clarinet, soprano saxophone, alto saxophone, baritone saxophone (tracks 1 and 3)
- Kenny Wheeler – trumpet, flugelhorn (tracks 1 and 3)
- Geoff Perkins – trombone (tracks 1 and 3)
- Malcolm Griffiths – trombone (tracks 1 and 3)
- Paul Nieman – trombone (tracks 1 and 3)
- Dick Hart – tuba (tracks 1 and 3)
- Howard Riley – piano (tracks 1 and 3)
- Tony Oxley – electronics (track 3)
- Derek Bailey – guitar (track 3)
- Barry Guy – double bass (tracks 1 and 3)
- Maggie Nicols – voice (tracks 1 and 3)
- Norma Winstone – voice (tracks 1 and 3)
