= Chicago 2002 =

Live album by Paul Rutherford
- Released: 2002
- Recorded: April 26 and 27, 2002
- Venues: The Empty Bottle, Chicago
- Genre: Free jazz
- Length: 1:17:20
- Labels: Emanem; 4082

Paul Rutherford chronology
Trombolenium (2002)	Chicago 2002 (2002)	Iskra³ (2005)

Chicago 2002 is a live album by trombonist Paul Rutherford. It was recorded on April 26 and 27, 2002, at The Empty Bottle in Chicago, and was released later that year by Emanem Records. The album features an extended Rutherford solo followed by three tracks on which he is joined by saxophonists Lol Coxhill and Mats Gustafsson, trombonist Jeb Bishop, cellist Fred Lonberg-Holm, bassist Kent Kessler, and percussionist Kjell Nordeson.

== Reception ==
Professional ratings
Review scores
Source	Rating
AllMusic	4/5 stars
The Penguin Guide to Jazz	3.5/4 stars

In a review for AllMusic, François Couture wrote: "Free improv albums rarely come as satisfying as this one," and, regarding the solo piece, stated that Rutherford is "in very good shape: inventive, resourceful, and absolutely capable of keeping an improvisation interesting for that long." He called "Blue Bottle" "a fantastic 20-minute group improvisation which features stunning interplay, a wide exploration of dynamics and colors... and an unmatched level of excitement."

Bill Shoemaker of JazzTimes called the trombone solo "hugely enjoyable," and noted that it "exemplifies Rutherford's unique ability to make challenging, trenchant materials flow effortlessly and his keen sense of pacing." He described the remaining tracks as "solid, despite a few moments of distracting exuberance."

The BBC's John Eyles remarked that the album "confirms that Rutherford is in fine fettle," and called it "thrilling stuff."

Concerning Rutherford's solo, Dusted Magazine's Derek Taylor commented: "Moving from moist legato lines to staccato firecracker bursts, the performance largely rivals his other solo recitals on record." Regarding the ensemble tracks, he wrote: "There's a looseness to some of the sections that betrays the group's nascency, but by and large the interplay stays highly engaged."

== Track listing ==
1. "Bottling Up" (Rutherford Solo) – 31:44
2. "Loliloquy" – 14:24
3. "Blue Bottle" – 19:41
4. "Bottle Out" – 11:18
- Track 1 was recorded on April 26, 2002, at the Empty Bottle in Chicago. Track 2 was recorded on April 27, 2002, at the same location.

== Personnel ==
- Paul Rutherford – trombone
- Lol Coxhill – soprano saxophone (tracks 2–4)
- Mats Gustafsson – tenor saxophone (tracks 2–4)
- Jeb Bishop – trombone (tracks 2–4)
- Fred Lonberg-Holm – cello, electronics (tracks 2–4)
- Kent Kessler – double bass (tracks 2–4)
- Kjell Nordeson – percussion (tracks 2–4)
