= Foxes Fox =

Studio album by Evan Parker, Steve Beresford, John Edwards, and Louis Moholo
- Released: 1999
- Recorded: July 21, 1999
- Studio: Gateway Studios, London
- Genre: Free improvisation
- Length: 1:17:40
- Label: Emanem; 4035

Foxes Fox is an album by saxophonist Evan Parker, pianist Steve Beresford, bassist John Edwards, and drummer Louis Moholo. It was recorded on July 21, 1999, at Gateway Studios in London, and was released later that year by Emanem Records. On the album, the musicians are heard in various groupings: duos, trios, and quartets.

== Reception ==
Professional ratings
Review scores
Source	Rating
AllMusic	4.5/5 stars
The Penguin Guide to Jazz	3.5/4 stars
The Encyclopedia of Popular Music	4/5 stars

In a review for AllMusic, Steve Loewy called the album "a stunning document all the way around," and wrote: "Parker plays on only five of the nine tracks, but the members of the rhythm trio perform magnificently on their features. Beresford is an original improviser form the Cecil Taylor school, while Moholo adds a sophisticated air, and Edwards continues to show himself as one of the leading free-style bassists. Still, it is largely Parker's show, and... he is in superb form."

The authors of The Penguin Guide to Jazz Recordings stated: "This is a collective album rather than a Parker... Beresford is as cleverly inventive as ever and is sparkling with ideas."

Bill Shoemaker of JazzTimes commented: "anyone weaned on the Impulse! or ESP catalogs will have an immediate comfort level with the proceedings on Foxes Fox... The superstructure of the album consists of three lengthy quartet tracks... which allows for a wide range of interaction, spanning minute investigations of texture to bold, often Moholo-triggered, surges of energy."

Writing for All About Jazz, Robert Spencer noted: "While [Parker's] approach is well-established at this point, he has a particular ability to adapt to his surroundings. As his fellows here are so capable, this disc is highly recommended."

One Final Note's Scott Hreha described the album as "an excellent session," and remarked: "Especially for those who remain wary of Parker's forays into more electronics-based collaborations, Foxes Fox might be a necessary dose of free improvisation."

== Track listing ==
Music by Evan Parker, John Edwards, Louis Moholo, and Steve Beresford.

1. "Wood on Wood" – 3:58
2. "Amoebic Mystery" – 22:33
3. "Running (With Scissors)" – 6:37
4. "Bird with a Shell" – 11:58
5. "Snail/Kite" – 4:20
6. "Fox's Fox" – 3:56
7. "Foxes Fox" – 17:17
8. "Toast Sweat" – 3:25
9. "Dog Bone D Flat" – 3:34

== Personnel ==
- Evan Parker – tenor saxophone, soprano saxophone (tracks 2, 4, 6, 7, 9)
- Steve Beresford – piano (tracks 2–5, 7–9)
- John Edwards – double bass (tracks 1–5, 7, 9)
- Louis Moholo – drums, cymbal, timpani, claves (tracks 1–4, 6–9)
