= Neuph =

Neuph: Compositions for Euphonium and Trombone

Studio album by Paul Rutherford
- Released: 1978 / 2005
- Recorded: January 30 and 31, 1978; April 14, 1980; June 26, 1980
- Venue: Rome; Pisa
- Studio: Mid Wales Sound Studios, Castle Caereinion, Wales, UK
- Genre: Free jazz
- Length: 1:10:11
- Label: Sweet Folk and Country; SFA LP 092; Emanem; 4118

Paul Rutherford chronology
Old Moers Almanac (1976)	Neuph: Compositions for Euphonium and Trombone (1978)	Paul Rutherford/Paul Lovens (2002)

Neuph: Compositions for Euphonium and Trombone is a solo album by trombonist and euphonium player Paul Rutherford. In its original version, released on LP by the Sweet Folk and Country label in 1978, it consisted of seven tracks that were recorded on January 30 and 31, 1978, at Mid Wales Sound Studios in Castle Caereinion, Wales, UK. In 2005, it was reissued on CD by Emanem Records with two additional tracks that were recorded live in April and June 1980 in Rome and Pisa, Italy. Most of the tracks involve overdubbing, and one track features a duet with a dog named Judy.

== Reception ==
Professional ratings
Review scores
Source	Rating
AllMusic	3.5/5 stars
The Penguin Guide to Jazz	3.5/4 stars

In a review for AllMusic, François Couture called the album "more than a curiosity, but a very interesting development of [Rutherford's] art," and wrote: "Whether you see it as accretive group improvisation with oneself or layer-by-layer instant composition, you do get multiple Rutherfords for the price of one... The music is obviously more dense than usual, without going overboard. Actually, Rutherford managed to put together strong pieces featuring multi-level dialogues and exploring textures and concepts that go beyond his 'traditional' solo work."

The authors of The Penguin Guide to Jazz Recordings described the album as "a fascinating experiment that anticipates some of Evan Parker's work in the same area."

Andrey Henkin of All About Jazz stated: "The musicianship and experimentation is excellent but what is confounding is that Rutherford is reacting to himself, not in real time, but in a studio, even speeding up certain tracks, to create a soundscape far different than the two live solo trombone tracks that open and close the disc. Some might call it impersonal, but it offers fascinating answers to the questions of how to play solo and how to use available technology to expand the role of a musician."

Writing for Paris Transatlantic, Dan Warburton commented: "The information level is high throughout, as one might expect – one Rutherford is usually enough to turn a trombone inside out, so you can imagine what three or four of them sound like – but the music is, despite its considerable complexity, instantly compelling and rewarding."

Point of Departure's Bill Shoemaker remarked: "The fluidity that is Rutherford's hallmark on trombone is very much in evidence in his euphonium playing, and the formal elasticity that is one of his best assets as an improviser remains intact in his multi-track pieces... Neuph won't dislodge Gentle Harm as the pinnacle of Rutherford's work in the '70s; but, it fills in what has been a nagging gap in his Compact Discography."

== Track listing ==
1. "Roman Tick" (For One Trombone) – 6:03 (bonus track on CD reissue)
2. "Yep 321" (For Two Euphoniums) – 8:30
3. "Realign 4" (For Four Trombones) – 9:00
4. "Three Levels" (For Three Trombones, One Double Speed) – 3:46
5. "Paunch And Judies" (For One Double Speed Trombone and Dog) – 1:22
6. "Chefor" (For One Euphonium) – 7:57
7. "Phase 2/2" (For Two Trombones and Two Euphoniums) – 8:06
8. "Neuph" (For One Trombone and One Euphonium) – 7:22
9. "Pisa Ear" (For One Trombone) – 17:24 (bonus track on CD reissue)
- Track 1 was recorded on April 14, 1980, in concert in Rome. Tracks 2–8 were recorded on January 30 and 31, 1978, at Mid Wales Sound Studios in Castle Caereinion, Wales, UK. Track 9 was recorded on June 26, 1980, in concert in Pisa.

== Personnel ==
- Paul Rutherford – trombone, euphonium
