= Slur (album) =

Studio album by Phil Minton Quartet
- Released: 2007
- Recorded: January 11, 2006
- Studio: Phoenix Studios, Iver Heath, Buckinghamshire, UK
- Genre: Free jazz
- Length: 50:20
- Label: Emanem; 4140
- Producer: Martin Davidson

Phil Minton chronology
Tasting (2007)	Slur (2007)	No Doughnuts in Hand (2008)

Slur is an album by the Phil Minton Quartet, featuring vocalist Minton, saxophonist John Butcher, pianist Veryan Weston, and percussionist Roger Turner. It was recorded on January 11, 2006, at Phoenix Studios, Iver Heath, Buckinghamshire, UK, and was released in 2007 by Emanem Records.

== Reception ==
Professional ratings
Review scores
Source	Rating
The Penguin Guide to Jazz	4/4 stars
All About Jazz	4.5/5 stars
All About Jazz	4.5/5 stars

The authors of The Penguin Guide to Jazz Recordings awarded the album a full 4 stars, and wrote: "Minton has abandoned any identifiable verbal component and the group behave more than ever like a prismatic lens, revolving around him. Here and there... they come together in something like conventional ensemble or combo playing, but for the most part the instruments maintain a certain distance one from the other, which gives Phil's yelps, barks and wails an even stranger connotation. Wonderful stuff."

In a review for All About Jazz, John Eyles stated: "Minton's extraordinary voice becomes an instrument... conveying a vast array of emotions and meanings through sound alone. As so often, that voice astonishes in the diversity of sound it can produce; moans, yelps, whoops, squeals, guttural roars, breathless gasps, dark mutterings, Loony Tunes squawking—and much more—are all in Minton's repertoire. Never contrived, he produces exactly the sound needed for the moment, each seemingly produced deep within his soul."

AAJ's Nic Jones commented: "It's probably no kind of aid at all to highlight just how far removed from the tried and trusted this music is. This does not however alter the fact that the practitioners of it have to be every bit as skilled in what they do as musicians working in any other field. This quartet is made up of four such practitioners, and their efforts result in music that's meat and drink for the adventurously minded."

== Track listing ==
1. "Almost There" – 8:03
2. "Lower Down" – 10:03
3. "Higher" – 1:54
4. "A Bit More" – 9:37
5. "Far Off" – 8:31
6. "Closer" – 3:58
7. "Back" – 5:35
8. "Length" – 2:09

== Personnel ==
- Phil Minton – voice
- John Butcher – soprano saxophone, tenor saxophone
- Veryan Weston – piano
- Roger Turner – percussion
