= The Gentle Harm of the Bourgeoisie =

Live album by Paul Rutherford
- Released: 1976
- Recorded: 1974
- Venue: Unity Theatre, London
- Genre: Free jazz
- Length: 55:26
- Label: Emanem; 3305/4019
- Producer: Martin Davidson

Paul Rutherford chronology
The Gentle Harm of the Bourgeoisie (1976)	Old Moers Almanac (1976)

The Gentle Harm of the Bourgeoisie is a live solo trombone album by Paul Rutherford, his first release under his own name. It was recorded at Unity Theatre, London during 1974, and was initially released on LP in 1976 by Emanem Records. In 1986, Emanem reissued the album on LP, and, in 1997, the label reissued it on CD with an additional track.

According to the album liner notes, no "electronic trickery" was involved in the recording, and the only sounds that are heard involve "one man, a trombone and some mutes." Upon its release, the album, which features extensive use of extended techniques such as multiphonics, proved to be influential within the world of improvisers.

== Reception ==
Professional ratings
Review scores
Source	Rating
AllMusic	4.5/5 stars
The Penguin Guide to Jazz	4/4 stars

In a review for AllMusic, François Couture noted that Rutherford "never falls into the pit of extended techniques demonstration," and wrote: "The trombonist follows his own agenda, constantly choosing the direction the listener didn't think of, slipping from one approach to the next, adding colors and even a bit of humor... For free improv fans, this one is a must-have; for trombonists, it ranks as a classic."

The authors of The Penguin Guide to Jazz Recordings awarded the album a full 4 stars, calling the music "wryly subversive," and stating: "Rutherford's grasp of multiphonics is already assured; additional sounds and overtones come from mutes, microphone knocks and from spittle in the horn."

In a 1987 review for The Wire, guitarist Derek Bailey called the album "the best record of solo free improvising you are likely to find," and commented: "It's all done by imagination plus the standard musical abilities; but imagination is the engine, and he keeps it unencumbered by forward planning or systematic devices."

The Chicago Reader's Bill Meyer noted that Rutherford "augmented his adroit manipulation of slide and mute with multiphonics, simultaneously singing through and playing the horn to get effects ranging from high-pitched quivers to low, guttural blasts," resulting in a recording on which "he sounds truly liberated, his trombone speaking in hitherto unknown tongues."

Saxophonist and writer Henry Kuntz called the album "a true 'tour de force'," and remarked: "Rutherford has let the concept of free improvisation imply an extremely open form of free association of sound and context. His pieces are truly 'pieces' in that they are entirely open-ended, employing an organic logic of the moment, allowing the mind/body (and instrument) to follow any tangent wherever it will (and to cease following whenever it will) rather than limiting itself to the demands of a more forced (and easily definable) structural unity."

== Track listing for CD reissue ==
1. "Noita Neila" – 4:28
2. "Elaquest" – 11:23
3. "Lonescariso" – 5:29
4. "Esuni Setag" – 9:02
5. "The Funny Side of Discreet" – 6:22 (bonus track on reissue)
6. "Osirac Senol" – 14:53
7. "Er Player Blues Now" – 3:23
- All tracks were recorded at the Unity Theatre in London. Tracks 1–2 were recorded on July 2, 1974. Tracks 3–5 were recorded on August 20, 1974. Tracks 6–7 were recorded on December 17, 1974.

== Personnel ==
- Paul Rutherford – trombone
