= In the Tradition (Alan Silva, Johannes Bauer, and Roger Turner album) =

Studio album by Alan Silva, Johannes Bauer, and Roger Turner
- Released: 1996
- Recorded: April 14 and 15, 1993
- Venue: Vandœuvre-lès-Nancy, France
- Genre: Free jazz
- Label: In Situ; IS 166
- Producer: Didier Petit

Alan Silva chronology
Take Some Risks (1989)	In the Tradition (1996)	A Hero's Welcome: Pieces for Rare Occasions (1999)

In the Tradition is an album by multi-instrumentalist Alan Silva, trombonist Johannes Bauer, and drummer Roger Turner. It was recorded in April 1993 in Vandœuvre-lès-Nancy, France, and was released in 1996 by In Situ Records.

In an interview, Silva stated that the tradition to which the album title refers is "an improvising tradition" that "goes back about forty thousand years." He commented: "this is probably as old as the guy picking up some rocks and - (claps hands, knocks on table) 'Yeah, that's interesting.'"

== Reception ==
Professional ratings
Review scores
Source	Rating
AllMusic	4/5 stars
The Penguin Guide to Jazz	3.5/4 stars

In a review for AllMusic, Dan Warburton wrote: "The title In the Tradition might lead one to expect one of those respectful tributes to the elders, à la Wynton Marsalis or James Carter..., but five seconds into the first piece... it's clear that listeners are in for a trip of another order. The synthesizer work is very impressive: the instrument has long been regarded as belonging to the pop/rock world, but Silva serves to remind listeners that Sun Ra and Paul Bley were among its very first champions... Bauer and Turner are just as wild, and the album cooks from beginning to end, rendering any questions as to whether such strong and uplifting music should be called free jazz or free improvisation pretty meaningless."

The authors of the Penguin Guide to Jazz Recordings awarded the album 3½ stars, and stated: "This wonderful trio shows how musically and inventively [Silva] embraced technology... Silva deals with neither orthodox tunes nor straightforward chord sequences, but manages to sound as if he has absorbed the Broadway songbook as well as the solo sequences of Free Jazz and Ascension."

== Track listing ==
Composed by Alan Silva, Johannes Bauer, and Roger Turner.

1. "Standard 1" – 5:09
2. "Standard 2" – 1:59
3. "Standard 3" – 2:44
4. "Standard 4" – 11:33
5. "Standard 5" – 6:59
6. "Standard 6" – 10:03
7. "Standard 7" – 3:01
8. "Standard 8" – 1:54
9. "Standard 9" – 14:30

== Personnel ==
- Alan Silva – synthesizer
- Johannes Bauer – trombone
- Roger Turner – drums, percussion
