= Caroline Kraabel =

- Born: 1961 (age 63–64); Torrance, California, U.S
- Occupation: Composer
- Instrument: Saxophone

Caroline Kraabel (born 1961 in Torrance, California) is an American saxophonist.

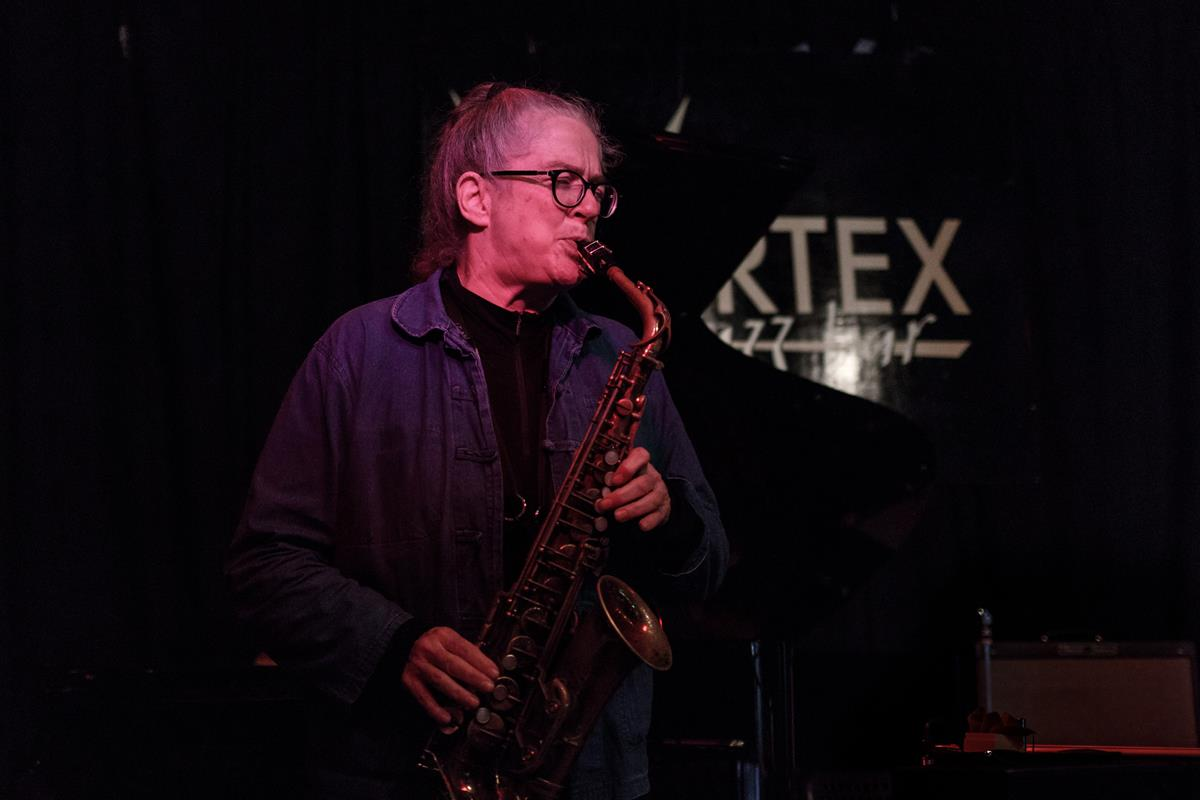
Caroline Kraabel, Saxophonist, at the Vortex Jazz Club in London in 2022

== Career ==
After living in Seattle, Kraabel moved to London while in her teenage years. She started playing saxophone and became active in London's improvised music scene, developing a style based on extended techniques and acoustics. She performed solo and with John Edwards, Veryan Weston, Charlotte Hug, Maggie Nicols, Phil Hargreaves, and the London Improvisors Orchestra. She organized and conducted pieces for Mass Producers, a 20-piece, all-female saxophone/voice orchestra and for Saxophone Experimentals in Space, a 55-piece group of young saxophonists. Kraabel hosted a weekly radio show on Resonance FM and is the editor for the London Musicians Collective's magazine Resonance.

Albums include Transitions with Maggie Nichols and Charlotte Hug, Five Shadows with Veryan Weston, Performances for Large Saxophone Ensemble 1 and 2 and Performances for Large Saxophone Ensemble 3 and 4 with Mass Producers, and the solo work Now We Are One Two.
