= Paul Rutherford (trombonist) =

English free improvising trombonist (1940–2007)

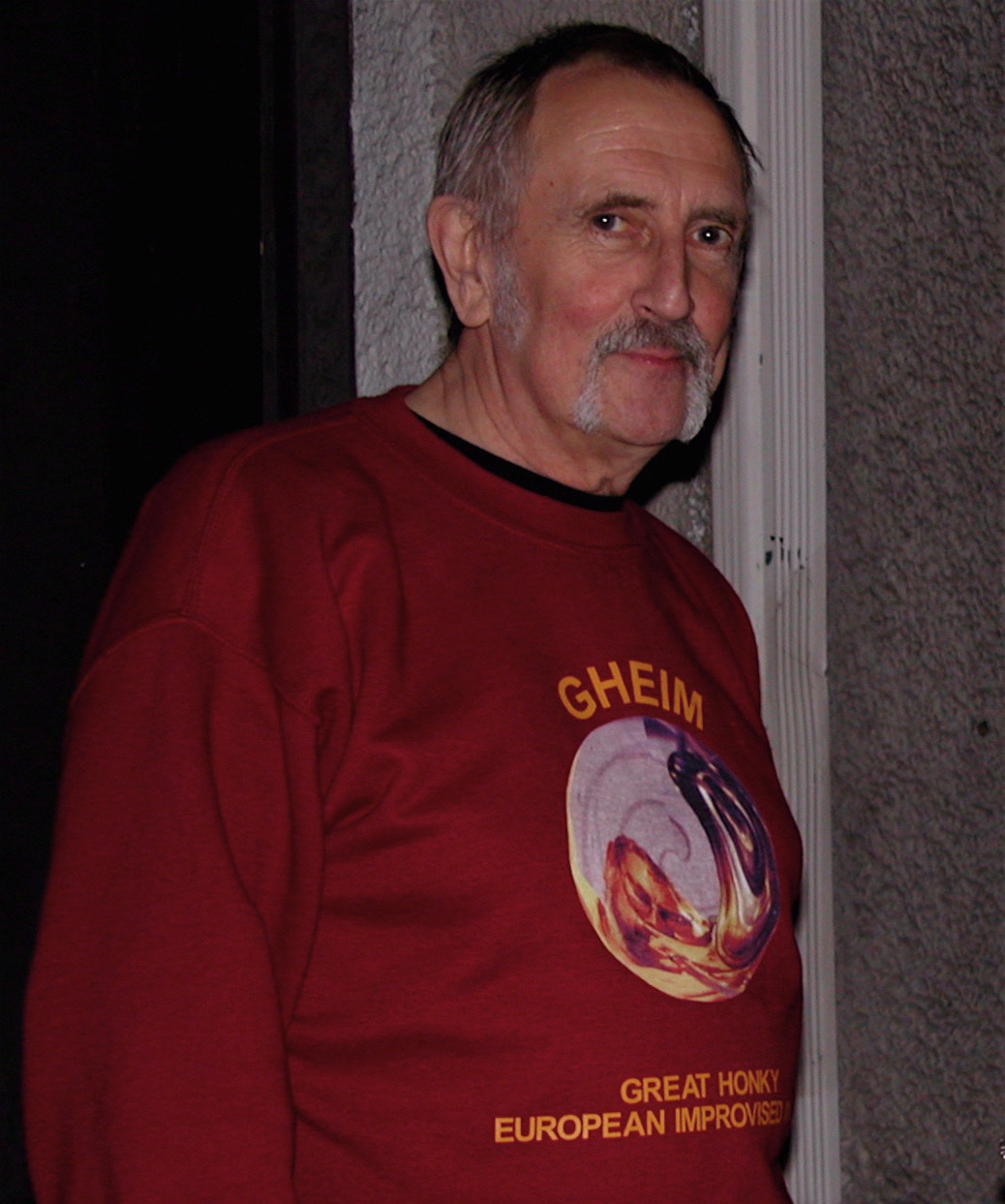
- Rutherford in 2005

Background information
- Born: Paul William Rutherford; 29 February 1940; Greenwich, London, England
- Died: 5 August 2007 (aged 67)
- Genres: Free improvisation, avant-garde jazz
- Occupation: Musician
- Instrument: Trombone
- Years active: 1950–2000

Paul William Rutherford (29 February 1940 – 5 August 2007) was an English free improvising trombonist.

== Biography ==
Born in Greenwich, South East London, England, Rutherford initially played saxophone but switched to trombone. During the 1960s, he taught at the Guildhall School of Music and Drama.

In 1970, Rutherford, guitarist Derek Bailey and bassist Barry Guy formed the improvising group Iskra 1903, which lasted until 1973. The formation was documented on a double album from Incus, later reissued with much bonus material on the three-CD set Chapter One (Emanem, 2000). A film soundtrack was separately released as Buzz Soundtrack. Iskra 1903 was one of the earliest free improvising groups to omit a drummer/percussionist, permitting the players to explore a range of textures and dynamics which set it apart from such other contemporary improvising ensembles as SME and AMM. The group's unusual name is the Slavic word for "spark"; it was the title of the Iskra revolutionary newspaper edited by Lenin. The "1903" designation means "20th century music for trio"; occasionally Evan Parker played with the group (Iskra 1904) and Rutherford also at one point assembled a 12-piece ensemble called, inevitably, Iskra 1912.

The group was later revived with Philipp Wachsmann replacing Bailey, a phase of the group's life that lasted from roughly 1977 to 1995; its earlier work is documented on Chapter Two (Emanem, 2006) and its final recordings were issued on Maya (Iskra 1903) and Emanem (Frankfurt 1991).

Rutherford also played with Globe Unity Orchestra, London Jazz Composer's Orchestra, Centipede, the Mike Westbrook Orchestra, and the Orckestra, a merger of avant-rock group Henry Cow, the Mike Westbrook Brass Band and folk singer Frankie Armstrong. He also played a very small number of gigs with Soft Machine. He is perhaps most famous for solo trombone improvisations.

Rutherford died of cirrhosis and a ruptured aorta on 5 August 2007, at the age of 67.

In November 2007, a memorial concert for Rutherford took place at the Red Rose Club in North London, at which musician friends played free jazz. In recognition of Rutherford's strong attachment to Cuba, which dated back to a 1986 tour he had undertaken as part of the British Council-sponsored Siger Band, his family donated three trombones and a euphonium to the Music Fund for Cuba.

== Discography ==
=== As leader ===
- 1970.01 – In Backward Times – Emanem (2017) (Paul Rutherford, Iskra 1903) (nd)
- 1972.11 – Sequences 72 & 73 – Emanem (1997) (Paul Rutherford, Iskra 1903, London Jazz Composers Orchestra) (nd)
- 1974.07 – The Gentle Harm of the Bourgeoisie – Emanem (1975) (Paul Rutherford) (1997 – Emanem, 2011 – Po Torch)
- 1975.11 – Solo in Berlin 1975 – Emanem (2007) (Paul Rutherford) (nd)
- 1976.05 – Old Moers Almanac – Ring Records (1976) (Paul Rutherford, Evan Parker, Hans Dulfer, Arjen Gorter, Rob du Bois, Peter Bennink, Martin van Duynhoven, Misha Mengelberg) (nd)
- 1977.02 – Neuph: Compositions for Euphonium and Trombone– Sweet Folk and Country (1978) (Paul Rutherford) (2005 – Emanem)
- 1977.05 – Tetralogy – Emanem (2009) (Paul Rutherford, Paul Rogers, Nigel Coombes, Iskra 1903) (nd)
- 1977.11 – Paul Rutherford/Paul Lovens – Po Torch (1978) (Paul Rutherford, Paul Lovens) (2023 – Po Torch)
- 1980.03 – To Fall a Victim to Ice-Cream's Charm – L'Orchestra (1980) (Paul Rutherford) (nd)
- 1983.03 – Gheim– Ogun (1986) (Paul Rutherford) (2004 – Emanem)
- 1986.11 – Trombolenium – Emanem (2002) (Paul Rutherford) (nd)
- 1988.11 – Rogues – Emanem (1996) (Paul Rutherford, Derek Bailey) (nd)
- 1997.10 – The First Full Turn - Emanem (1998) (Paul Rutherford, Lawrence Casserley, Philipp Wachsmann - RoTToR) (nd)
- 1999.05 – The Conscience - NoBusiness (2017) (Paul Rutherford, Sabu Toyozumi) (nd)
- 1999.08 – Raahe '99 – Slam (2012) (Paul Rutherford, Jari Hongisto, Il Vento Chiaro) (nd
- 2002.04 – Chicago 2002 – Emanem (2002) (Paul Rutherford, Torsten Müller, Dylan van der Schyff) (nd)
- 2004.03 – Iskra³ – Psi (2005) (Paul Rutherford, Philipp Wachsmann, Evan Parker) (nd)
- 2004.04 – Hoxha – Spool (2005) (Paul Rutherford, Ken Vandermark, Torsten Müller, Dylan van der Schyff) (nd)
- 2004.11 – The Zone– Konnex (2006) (Paul Rutherford, Harris Eisenstadt, Paul Rogers) (nd)
- 2017.06 – Are We in Diego? – WhirrbooM! (2018) (Paul Rutherford, Ken Vandermark, Torsten Müller, Dylan van der Schyff) (nd)

With Iskra 1903

- Iskra 1903 (Incus, 1972) reissued as Chapter One 1970-1972 (Emanem, 2000)
- Iskra Nckpa 1903 (Maya, 1995)
- Frankfurt 1991 (Emanem, 2001)
- Buzz Soundtrack (Emanem, 2002)
- Chapter Two (1981/3) (Emanem, 2006)
- Goldsmiths (Emanem, 2011)
- South on the Northern (Emanem, 2013)

=== As sideman ===
With Lol Coxhill

- Instant Replay (Nato, 1983)
- Before My Time (Chabada, 1987)
- The Holywell Concert (Slam, 1990)
- Termite One (Bruce's Fingers, 1990)
- Spectral Soprano (Emanem, 2002)
- Milwaukee 2002 (Emanem, 2003)
- Out to Launch (Emanem, 2003)

With Elton Dean

- Welcomet (Impetus, 1987)
- The Vortex Tapes (Slam, 1992)
- Elton Dean's Newsense (Slam, 1998)

With Paul Dunmall

- The Great Divide (Cuneiform, 2001)
- Bridging (Clean Feed, 2003)
- I Wish You Peace (Cuneiform, 2004)
- Shooters Hill (FMR, 2004)

With Globe Unity Orchestra

- Live in Wuppertal (FMP, 1973)
- Der Alte Mann Bricht...Sein Schweigen (FMP, 1974)
- Bavarian Calypso & Good Bye (FMP, 1975)
- Evidence Vol. 1 (FMP, 1976)
- Into the Valley Vol. 2 (FMP, 1976)
- Jahrmarkt & Local Fair (Po Torch, 1977)
- Pearls (FMP, 1977)
- Improvisations (Japo, 1978)
- Hamburg '74 (FMP, 1979)
- Compositions (Japo, 1980)
- Rumbling (FMP, 1991)
- Globe Unity 2002 (Intakt, 2003)
- Baden-Baden '75 (FMP, 2011)

With Barry Guy

- Ode (Incus, 1972)
- Zurich Concerts (Intakt, 1988)
- Harmos (Intakt, 1989)
- Double Trouble (Intakt, 1990)
- Portraits (Intakt, 1994)
- Three Pieces for Orchestra (Intakt, 1997)
- Double Trouble Two (Intakt, 1998)

With George Haslam

- 1989 and All That (Slam, 1989)
- Level Two (Slam, 1993)
- Cuban Meltdown (Slam, 2007)

With Tony Oxley

- 4 Compositions for Sextet (CBS, 1970)
- Ichnos (RCA Victor, 1971)
- Tony Oxley (Incus, 1975)
- A Birthday Tribute: 75 years (Incus, 2013) recorded in 1977 and 1993
- Unreleased 1974–2016 (Discus, 2022) recorded in 1974, 1981, and 2016

With Spontaneous Music Ensemble

- Challenge (Eyemark, 1966)
- Withdrawal (Emanem, 1997)
- Frameworks (Emanem, 2007)
- Trio & Triangle (Emanem, 2008)

With John Stevens

- 4,4,4 (View, 1980)
- Freebop (Affinity, 1982)
- The Life of Riley (Affinity, 1984)
- A Luta Continua (Konnex, 1994)
- Blue (Culture Press, 1998)

With Mike Westbrook

- Release (Deram, 1968)
- Marching Song (Deram, 1970)
- Mike Westbrook's Love Songs (Deram, 1970)
- Metropolis (RCA/Neon, 1971)
- Citadel & Room 315 (RCA Victor, 1975)
- Plays for the Record (Transatlantic, 1976)
- Love & Dream and Variations (Transatlantic, 1976)
- Goose Sauce (Original, 1978)

With others

- Maarten Altena, PISA 1980: Improvisors' Symposium (Incus, 1981)
- Han Bennink, A European Proposal (Horo, 1979)
- Berlin Contemporary Jazz Orchestra, Live in Japan '96 (DIW, 1997)
- Anthony Braxton, Trio (London) 1993 (Leo, 1993)
- John Wolf Brennan, Through the Ear of a Raindrop (Leo, 1998)
- Peter Brotzmann, The Marz Combo Live in Wuppertal (FMP, 1993)
- Peter Brotzmann, Fuck de Boere (Atavistic, 2001)
- Centipede, Septober Energy (RCA/Neon, 1971)
- Tony Coe, Le Chat Se Retourne (Nato, 1984)
- Henry Cow, Henry Cow with Mike Westbrook Brass Band and Frankie Armstrong (ReR, 2006)
- Death in Vegas, Dubs (Concrete, 1996)
- Death in Vegas, Dead Elvis (Concrete, 1997)
- Bob Downes, Crossing Borders (Reel, 2009)
- Bob Downes, New York Suite (Openian, 2011)
- Joe Gallivan, Innocence (Cadence, 1992)
- Giorgio Gaslini, Message (BASF, 1973)
- Giorgio Gaslini, Jean-Luc Ponty Meets Giorgio Gaslini (Associati, 1974)
- Peter Kowald, Peter Kowald Quintet (FMP, 1973)
- Anne LeBaron, 1, 2, 4, 3 (Innova, 2010)
- Manfred Mann's Earth Band, Solar Fire (Bronze, 1973)
- Misha Mengelberg, Groupcomposing (Instant Composers Pool, 1978)
- New Jazz Orchestra, Western Reunion London 1965 (Vocalion, 2006)
- Evan Parker, The Ericle of Dolphi (Po Torch, 1989)
- Evan Parker, Waterloo 1985 (Emanem, 1999)
- Krzysztof Penderecki, Don Cherry, Actions (Philips, 1971)
- Gilles Peterson, Impressed 2 with Gilles Peterson (Universal, 2004)
- Jon Rose, Forward of Short Leg (Dossier, 1987)
- Mario Schiano, And So On (Splasc(H) 1992)
- Mario Schiano, Used to Be Friends (Splasc(H) 1996)
- Manfred Schoof, European Echoes (FMP, 1969)
- Chris Spedding, Songs Without Words (EMI/Harvest, 2015)
- Spring Heel Jack, AMaSSED (Thirsty Ear, 2002)
- John Surman, John Surman (Deram, 1969)
- Keith Tippett, Live at Le Mans (Red Eye Music, 2007)
- Fred Van Hove, Suite for B... City (FMP, 1997)
- Alexander von Schlippenbach, The Living Music (Quasar, 1969)
- Alexander von Schlippenbach, Globe Unity 67/70 (Atavistic, 2001)
- Philipp Wachsmann, Free Zone Appleby 2006 (Psi, 2007)
- Alan Wakeman, The Octet Broadcasts 1969 and 1979 (Gearbox, 2020)
- Charlie Watts, Live at Fulham Town Hall (CBS, 1986)
- Kenny Wheeler, Music for Large & Small Ensembles (ECM, 1990)
- Norma Winstone, Edge of Time (Argo, 1972)
