= 1939 in music =

This is a list of notable events in music that took place in the year 1939.

== Specific locations ==
- 1939 in British music
- 1939 in Norwegian music

== Specific genres ==
- 1939 in country music
- 1939 in jazz

== Events ==
- January 4 – New band to be headed by Harry James, first trumpet with Benny Goodman, formed; goes into rehearsal January 6. It has already been dated for a short stay at the Statler Hotel, Boston, opening February 1. James has taken Buddy Rich from Bunny Berigan's orchestra to handle the drums and secures Frank Sinatra as vocalist.
- February – Recording of "A-Tisket, A-Tasket" turned out by Ella Fitzgerald and Chick Webb for Decca has established a new eight-year high in sales for the industry. The sales on this 35c have already gone over 250,000. The company's previous record had been the 160,000 copies achieved by Bing Crosby's version of "Sweet Leilani".
- February 24 – Symphony No. 3 by Roy Harris receives its world premiere in Boston, as Serge Koussevitzky conducts the Boston Symphony Orchestra
- April 9 – African-American contralto Marian Anderson performs before 75,000 people at the Lincoln Memorial in Washington, D.C., after having been denied the use both of Constitution Hall by the Daughters of the American Revolution, and of a public high school by the federally controlled District of Columbia. First Lady of the United States Eleanor Roosevelt resigns from the DAR because of their decision.
- April 20 – Billie Holiday records the anti-lynching song "Strange Fruit" in the United States.
- May 17 – Sergei Prokofiev's Alexander Nevsky (Op. 78) cantata debuts in Moscow. It is an adaptation from the 1938 film score to Alexander Nevsky.
- May 22 – Columbia Recording Corporation incorporated in Delaware.
- June 10 – Premiere of Arthur Bliss's Piano Concerto in B-flat with soloist Solomon; Arnold Bax's 7th Symphony; and Ralph Vaughan Williams' Five Variants of Dives and Lazarus, with the New York Philharmonic under Sir Adrian Boult at Carnegie Hall.
- August 22 – "You Are My Sunshine" first recorded.
- June 21 – Francis Poulenc's Organ Concerto is premièred in Paris.
- November 1 – Bruno Walter leaves Germany for the United States.
- December – Ali Akbar Khan accompanies Ravi Shankar on the sarod during the latter's debut performance at the annual music conference in Allahabad.
- December 31 – A special concert of music by Johann Strauss II is performed by the Vienna Philharmonic conducted by Clemens Krauss in the great hall of the Musikverein in Vienna, predecessor of a continuing series of Vienna New Year's Concerts.
- The Nordstrom Sisters are the resident act at The Ritz Hotel, London.
- Jo Stafford and The Pied Pipers join the Tommy Dorsey orchestra.
- The Squadronaires form.
- Dorothy Kirsten makes her professional concert debut at the New York World's Fair.
- Manuel de Falla leaves Granada for exile in Argentina.

== Publications ==
- Ernst Krenek – Music Here and Now

== Albums released ==
- Featuring Charlie Christian – Benny Goodman
- Cowboy Songs – Bing Crosby
- Negro Sinful Songs – Lead Belly (Huddie Ledbetter)

== Top popular recordings ==
The twenty-five popular records listed below were extracted from Joel Whitburn's Pop Memories 1890–1954, record sales reported on the "Discography of American Historical Recordings" website, and other sources as specified. Numerical rankings are approximate, they are only used as a frame of reference.

Rank	Artist	Title	Label	Recorded	Released	Chart positions
1	Glenn Miller and his Orchestra	"In the Mood"	Bluebird 10416	August 1, 1939	September 15, 1939	US Billboard 1939 #1, US #1 for 12 weeks, 30 total weeks, National Recording Registry 2004
2	Glahe Musette Orchestra	"Beer Barrel Polka"	Victor V-710	May 11, 1938	April 1939	US Billboard 1939 #2, US #1 for 4 weeks, 21 total weeks
3	Orrin Tucker and His Orchestra Vocal chorus Bonnie Baker	"Oh Johnny, Oh Johnny, Oh!"	Columbia 35228	August 20, 1939	September 29, 1939	US Billboard 1939 #3, US #2 for 4 weeks, 14 total weeks, sold 1,500,000
4	Glenn Miller and his Orchestra	"Moonlight Serenade"	Bluebird B-10214	April 4, 1939	April 26, 1939	US Billboard 1939 #4, US #3 for 1 week, 15 total weeks, Grammy Hall of Fame 1991, ASCAP song of 1939
5	Judy Garland	"Over the Rainbow"	Decca 2672	July 28, 1939	August 1939	US Billboard 1939 #5, US #5 for 1 week, 12 total weeks, Grammy Hall of Fame 1981, AFI 1, RIAA 1, Music Imprint 1 of 1930s, ASCAP song of 1938, National Recording Registry 2016
6	Kate Smith	"God Bless America"	Victor 26198	March 21, 1939	April 5, 1939	US Billboard 1939 #6, US #5 for 1 week, 12 total weeks, Grammy Hall of Fame 1982, National Recording Registry 2002
7	Glenn Miller and his Orchestra	"Over the Rainbow"	Bluebird 10366	July 12, 1939	August 17, 1939	US Billboard 1939 #7, US #1 for 7 weeks, 15 total weeks
8	Larry Clinton and His Orchestra	"Deep Purple"	Victor 26141	December 23, 1938	January 18, 1939	US Billboard 1939 #8, US #1 for 9 weeks, 13 total weeks, Grammy Hall of Fame 2000
9	Frankie Masters and His Orchestra	"Scatter Brain"	Vocalion 4915	May 25, 1939	August 1939	US Billboard 1939 #9, US #1 for 8 weeks, 16 total weeks
10	Benny Goodman and His Orchestra (Vocal Martha Tilton)	"And the Angels Sing"	Victor 26170	February 1, 1939	March 1, 1939	US Billboard 1939 #10, US #1 for 5 weeks, 14 total weeks, Grammy Hall of Fame 1987
11	Mary Martin (Eddy Duchin Orchestra)	""My Heart Belongs to Daddy"	Brunswick 8282	December 2, 1938	January 1939	US Billboard 1939 #11, US #1 for 1 weeks, 16 total weeks
12	The Ink Spots	""If I Didn't Care"	Decca 2286	January 12, 1939	February 9, 1939	US Billboard 1939 #12, US #2 for 1 week, 9 total weeks, Grammy Hall of Fame 1987, National Recording Registry 2017, sold 19,000,000
13	Bing Crosby	"What's New?"	Decca 2671	June 30, 1939	September 1939	US BB 1939 #13, US #2 for 2 weeks, 10 total weeks
14	Shep Fields and His Rippling Rhythm Orchestra	"South of the Border (Down Mexico Way)"	Bluebird 10376	August 1, 1939	August 14, 1939	US Billboard 1939 #14, US #1 for 5 weeks, 18 total weeks
15	Bob Crosby and His Orchestra	"Day In, Day Out"	Decca 2703	July 24, 1939	August 1939	US Billboard 1939 #15, US #1 for 1 week, 13 total weeks
16	Cab Calloway and His Orchestra	"(Hep-Hep) The Jumpin' Jive"	Vocalion 5005	July 17, 1939	August 1939	US Billboard 1939 #16, US #2 for 4 weeks, 12 total weeks, Grammy Hall of Fame 2017
17	Glenn Miller and his Orchestra	"Stairway to the Stars"	Bluebird 10276	May 9, 1939	May 22, 1939	US Billboard 1939 #17, US #1 for 4 weeks, 13 total weeks
18	Kay Kyser and His Orchestra	"Three Little Fishies"	Brunswick 8358	April 8, 1939	May 1939	US Billboard 1939 #18, US #1 for 2 weeks, 9 total weeks
19	Sammy Kaye and His Orchestra	"Penny Serenade"	Victor 26150	January 20, 1939	February 1, 1939	US BB 1939 #19, US #2 for 1 week, 9 total weeks
20	Al Donahue and His Orchestra	"Jeepers Creepers"	Vocalion 4513	November 23, 1938	December 1938	US Billboard 1939 #20, US #1 for 5 weeks, 13 total weeks
21	Glenn Miller and his Orchestra	"The Man With The Mandolin"	Bluebird 10358	July 12, 1939	July 31, 1939	US Billboard 1939 #12, US #1 for 3 weeks, 10 total weeks
22	Glen Gray and Casa Loma Orchestra	"Sunrise Serenade"	Decca 2321	February 17, 1939	March 1939	US Billboard 1939 #13, US #1 for 2 weeks, 16 total weeks
23	Woody Herman and His Orchestra	"At the Woodchopper's Ball"	Decca 2440	April 12, 1939	May 1939	US BB 1939 #23, US #9 for 1 week, 6 total weeks, Grammy Hall of Fame 2002
24	The Andrews Sisters	"Hold Tight, Hold Tight"	Decca 2214	November 21, 1938	December 1938	US BB 1939 #24, US #2 for 1 week, 11 total weeks
25	Glen Gray and Casa Loma Orchestra	"Heaven Can Wait"	Decca 2321	February 17, 1939	March 1, 1939	US Billboard 1939 #25, US #1 for 2 weeks, 13 total weeks

Additional recordings of historical interest, and songs that crossed over from Hillbilly (Country) and Race (R&B):

Rank	Artist	Title	Label	Recorded	Released	Chart positions
26	Glenn Miller and his Orchestra	"Blue Orchids"	Bluebird 10372	July 26, 1939	August 14, 1939	US Billboard 1939 #18, US #1 for 1 week, 12 total weeks
27	The Ink Spots	""My Prayer"	Decca 2790	September 18, 1939	October 1939	US Billboard 1939 #42, US #3 for 1 week, 12 total weeks
28	Tommy Dorsey and His Orchestra (Vocal Jack Leonard)	"Our Love"	Victor 26202	March 15, 1939	April 5, 1939	US Billboard 1939 #19, US #1 for 1 week, 11 total weeks
29	Kay Kyser and His Orchestra	"The Umbrella Man"	Brunswick 8225	September 1, 1938	November 1938	US Billboard 1939 #20, US #1 for 1 weeks, 11 total weeks
30	Glenn Miller and his Orchestra	"Wishing (Will Make It So)"	Bluebird 10219	April 10, 1939	May 3, 1939	US Billboard 1939 #30, US #1 for 4 weeks, 14 total weeks
31	Artie Shaw and His Orchestra (Vocal Helen Forrest)	"They Say"	Bluebird 10075	December 19, 1938	December 28, 1938	US Billboard 1939 #16, US #1 for 2 weeks, 8 total weeks
35	The Ink Spots	"Address Unknown"	Decca 2707	August 17, 1939	October 1939	US Billboard 1939 #30, US #1 for 1 week, 9 total weeks
45	Glenn Miller and his Orchestra	"Moon Love"	Bluebird 10303	May 25, 1939	June 12, 1939	US Billboard 1939 #9, US #1 for 4 weeks, 16 total weeks
189	Walter Huston	"September Song"	Brunswick 8272	November 14, 1938	January 1939	US Billboard 1939 #189, US #12 for 1 week, 5 total weeks
190	Gene Autry	"South of the Border (Down Mexico Way)"	Vocalion 5122	September 11, 1939	October 13, 1939	US Billboard 1939 #190, US #12 for 1 week, 4 total weeks, US BBHB 1939 #8, US Hillbilly #1 for 2 weeks, 22 total weeks, 1,000,000 sales
325	Ted Weems And His Orchestra (vocal Perry Como)	"I Wonder Who's Kissing Her Now"	Decca 2919	October 5, 1939	December 1939	US Billboard 1939 #325, US #19 for 1 week, 1 total weeks

== Race and blues hits ==
Rank	Artist	Title	Label	Recorded	Released	Chart positions
1	The Ink Spots	""If I Didn't Care"	Decca 2286	January 12, 1939	February 9, 1939	US Billboard 1939 #38, US #2 for 1 week, 9 total weeks, Grammy Hall of Fame 1987, National Recording Registry 2017
2	Cab Calloway and His Orchestra	"(Hep-Hep) The Jumpin' Jive"	Vocalion 5005	July 17, 1939	August 1939	US Billboard 1939 #25, US #2 for 4 weeks, 12 total weeks, Grammy Hall of Fame 2017
3	The Ink Spots	"Address Unknown"	Decca 2707	August 17, 1939	October 1939	US Billboard 1939 #30, US #1 for 1 week, 9 total weeks
4	The Ink Spots	""My Prayer"	Decca 2790	September 18, 1939	October 1939	US Billboard 1939 #42, US #3 for 1 week, 12 total weeks
5	Fats Waller	"Good for Nothin' but Love"	Bluebird 10129	January 19, 1939	February 18, 1939	US Billboard 1939 #102, US #7 for 1 week, 6 total weeks
6	Chick Webb Orchestra (vocal Ella Fitzgerald)	"'F.D.R. Jones"	Decca 2105	October 6, 1938	November 1938	US Billboard 1939 #116, US #8 for 1 week, 6 total weeks
7	Chick Webb Orchestra (vocal Ella Fitzgerald)	"Undecided"	Decca 2323	February 17, 1939	March 1939	US Billboard 1939 #120, US #8 for 1 week, 4 total weeks
8	Ella Fitzgerald And Her Famous Orchestra	"I Want the Waiter (With the Water)"	Decca 2628	June 29, 1939	September 1939	US Billboard 1939 #138, US #9 for 1 week, 3 total weeks
9	Lionel Hampton and His Orchestra	"Wizzin' the Wiz"	Victor 26233	April 5, 1939	May 3, 1939	US Billboard 1939 #153, US #10 for 1 week, 5 total weeks
10	Louis Armstrong and His Orchestra	"When the Saints Go Marching In"	Decca 2230	May 13, 1938	January 1939	US Billboard 1939 #155, US #15 for 1 week, 3 total weeks
11	The Mills Brothers	"Sweet Adeline (You're the Flower of My Heart)"	Decca 2285	January 24, 1939	February 9, 1939	US Billboard 1939 #160, US #10 for 1 week, 2 total weeks
12	Count Basie and His Orchestra	"Jumpin' At The Woodside"	Decca 2212	August 22, 1938	December 1938	US Billboard 1939 #174, US #11 for 1 week, 4 total weeks
13	Fats Waller	"Hold Tight"	Bluebird 10116	January 19, 1939	February 18, 1939	US Billboard 1939 #176, US #11 for 1 week, 4 total weeks
14	Louis Armstrong and His Orchestra	"West End Blues"	Decca 2480	February 1, 1939	May 1939	US Billboard 1939 #218, US #13 for 1 week, 1 total weeks
15	Mildred Bailey	"Blame it on My Last Affair"	Vocalion 04632	December 8, 1938	February 1939	US Billboard 1939 #219, US #13 for 1 week, 1 total weeks
16	Billie Holiday	"Strange Fruit"	Commodore 526	April 20, 1939	1939	US Billboard 1939 #287, US #16 for 1 week, 2 total weeks, Grammy Hall of Fame 1978, National Recording Registry 2002, sells 1M copies
18	Blind Boy Fuller	"Big Leg Woman Gets My Pay"	Vocalion 05030	July 12, 1939	November 1939	
19	Robert Johnson	"Love in Vain Blues"	Vocalion 04630	June 20, 1937	February 9, 1939	
20	Robert Johnson	"Preachin' Blues (Up Jumped the Devil)"	Vocalion 04630	November 27, 1936	February 9, 1939	
21	Lead Belly (Huddie Ledbetter)	"The Gallis Pole"	Musicraft 227	June 14, 1939	August 1939	
22	Lead Belly	"The Bourgeois Blues"	Musicraft 227	April 1, 1939	August 1939	
23	Lead Belly	"The Boll Weevil"	Musicraft 226	April 1, 1939	August 1939	

== Christmas hits ==
Rank	Artist	Title	Label	Recorded	Released	Chart positions
1	Guy Lombardo and His Royal Canadians	"Auld Lang Syne"	Decca 2478	March 7, 1939	December 1939	

== Published popular music ==
- "Address Unknown" words and music: Carmen Lombardo, Johnny Marks & Dedette Lee Hill
- "All in Fun" words: Oscar Hammerstein II, music: Jerome Kern Introduced by Frances Mercer and Jack Whiting in the musical Very Warm for May
- "All or Nothing at All" w. Jack Lawrence m. Arthur Altman
- "All the Things You Are" w. Oscar Hammerstein II m. Jerome Kern from the musical Very Warm for May
- "Anatole (Of Paris)" w.m. Sylvia Fine Introduced by Danny Kaye in the revue The Straw Hat Revue
- "An Apple For the Teacher" w. Johnny Burke m. James V. Monaco
- "Are You Havin' Any Fun?" w. Jack Yellen m. Sammy Fain
- "The Army Air Corps" w.m. Robert M. Crawford
- "At the Woodchopper's Ball" m. Woody Herman & Joe Bishop
- "Back In The Saddle Again" w.m. Gene Autry & Ray Whitley
- "Between Eighteenth And Nineteenth On Chestnut Street" w.m. Will Osborne & Dick Rodgers
- "Bless You" w.m. Don Baker & Eddie Lane
- "Blue Orchids" w.m. Hoagy Carmichael
- "Bluebirds in the Moonlight" w. Leo Robin m. Ralph Rainger
- "The Boys in the Back Room" w. Frank Loesser m. Frederick Hollander. Introduced by Marlene Dietrich in the film Destry Rides Again.
- "Brazil" w. (Eng) Bob Russell m. Ary Baroso
- "Careless" w.m. Lew Quadling, Eddy Howard & Dick Jurgens
- "Comes Love" w.m. Sam H. Stept, Charles Tobias & Lew Brown
- "Cuckoo in the Clock" w. Johnny Mercer m. Walter Donaldson
- "Darn That Dream" w. Eddie DeLange m. Jimmy Van Heusen
- "Day In, Day Out" w. Johnny Mercer m. Rube Bloom
- "Desert Rumba" m. John Serry, Sr.
- "Ding-Dong! the Witch Is Dead" w. E. Y. Harburg m. Harold Arlen
- "Do I Love You?" w.m. Cole Porter
- "Don't Worry 'Bout Me" w. Ted Koehler m. Rube Bloom
- "Faithful Forever" w. Leo Robin m. Ralph Rainger
- "Flyin' Home" w. Sid Robin m. Lionel Hampton & Benny Goodman
- "Frenesi" w. (Eng) Ray Charles & Bob Russell m. Alberto Dominguez
- "The Gaucho Serenade" w.m. James Cavanaugh, John Redmond & Nat Simon
- "Give Him the Ooh-La-La" w.m. Cole Porter
- "Give it Back to the Indians" w. Lorenz Hart m. Richard Rodgers. Introduced by Mary Jane Walsh in the musical Too Many Girls.
- "Go Fly a Kite" w. Johnny Burke m. James V. Monaco
- "God Bless America" w.m. Irving Berlin
- "Good Morning" w. Arthur Freed m. Nacio Herb Brown
- "Goodnight, Children Ev'rywhere" w.m. Gabby Rogers & Harry Phillips
- "Hang Your Heart on a Hickory Limb" w. Johnny Burke m. James V. Monaco
- "Heaven Can Wait" w. Eddie DeLange m. Jimmy Van Heusen
- "Heaven in My Arms" w. Oscar Hammerstein II m. Jerome Kern. Introduced by Jack Whiting, Frances Mercer and Hollace Shaw in the musical Very Warm for May
- "Honey Hush" Fats Waller, Ed Kirkeby
- "Huckleberry Duck" w. Jack Lawrence m. Raymond Scott
- "I Didn't Know What Time It Was" w. Lorenz Hart m. Richard Rodgers. Introduced by Richard Kollmar and Marcy Westcott in the musical Too Many Girls. Performed by Trudy Erwin dubbing for Lucille Ball in the 1940 film version and interpolated into the score of the 1957 film Pal Joey where it was sung by Frank Sinatra.
- "I Get Along Without You Very Well (Except Sometimes)" m. Hoagy Carmichael w. Jane Brown Thompson
- "I Like to Recognize the Tune" w. Lorenz Hart m. Richard Rodgers. Introduced by Eddie Bracken, Marcy Westcott, Mary Jane Walsh, Richard Kollmar and Hal Le Roy in the musical Too Many Girls.
- "I Miss You in the Morning" w. Edgar Leslie m. Joe Burke
- "I Never Knew Heaven Could Speak" w. Mack Gordon m. Harry Revel
- "I Poured My Heart Into a Song" w.m. Irving Berlin
- "I Thought About You" w. Johnny Mercer m. Jimmy Van Heusen
- "I Want My Mama" w. (Port) Jararaca & Vincente Paiva (Eng) Al Stillman m. Jararaca & Vincente Paiva
- "I Went to a Marvelous Party" w.m. Noël Coward. Introduced by Beatrice Lillie in the revue Set to Music.
- "If a Grey Haired Lady Says "How's Yer Father?"" w.m. Ted Waite
- "If I Didn't Care" w.m. Jack Lawrence
- "If I Only Had a Brain" w. E. Y. Harburg m. Harold Arlen
- "If I Only Had Wings" w.m. Sid Colin & Ronnie Aldrich
- "I'll Never Smile Again" w.m. Ruth Lowe
- "I'll Walk Beside You" w.m. Alan Murray & Edward Lockton
- "I'm Building a Sailboat of Dreams" Cliff Friend, Dave Franklin
- "In a Mellow Tone" w. Milt Gabler m. Duke Ellington
- "In an Eighteenth Century Drawing Room" m. Raymond Scott
- "In the Middle of a Dream" w. Al Stillman m. Tommy Dorsey & Einar Swan
- "In The Mood" w. Andy Razaf m. Joe Garland
- "Is 'E An Aussie, Lizzie, Is 'E?" w.m. B. C. Hilliam & Malcolm McEachern
- "It's A Big, Wide, Wonderful World" w.m. John Rox
- "It's a Hap-Hap-Happy Day" w. Sammy Timberg & Winston Sharples m. Al J. Neiburg. Introduced by the voice of Lanny Ross on the soundtrack of the animated feature film Gulliver's Travels.
- "I've Got My Eyes On You" w.m. Cole Porter
- "J'attendrai" w. (Fr) Louis Poterat (Eng) Anna Sosenko m. Dino Olivieri
- "The Jumpin' Jive" w.m. Cab Calloway, Frank Froeba & Jack Palmer
- "Katie Went to Haiti" w.m. Cole Porter
- "Kiss Me Goodnight, Sergeant-Major" Art Noel, Don Pelosi
- "The Lady's In Love With You" w. Frank Loesser m. Burton Lane
- "The Lamp Is Low" w. Mitchell Parish m. Peter De Rose & Bert Shefter
- "Leanin' On The Ole Top Rail" w.m. Charles Kenny & Nick Kenny
- "Lili Marlene" w. (Ger) Hans Leip (Eng) Tommie Connor m. Norbert Schultze
- "The Little Man Who Wasn't There" w. Harold Adamson m. Bernie Hanighen
- "Love Never Went to College" w. Lorenz Hart m. Richard Rodgers
- "A Lover Is Blue" w.m. Charles Carpenter, James R. Mundy & Trummy Young
- "Lydia, The Tattooed Lady" w. E. Y. Harburg m. Harold Arlen. Introduced by Groucho Marx in the film At the Circus.
- "A Man and His Dream" w. Johnny Burke m. James V. Monaco
- "The Man With the Mandolin" w. James Cavanaugh & John Redmond m. Frank Weldon
- "The Masquerade Is Over" w. Herb Magidson m. Allie Wrubel
- "The Moon and the Willow Tree" w. Johnny Burke m. Victor Schertzinger
- "Moon Love" w.m. Mack David, Mack Davis & Andre Kostelanetz
- "Moonlight Serenade" w. Mitchell Parish m. Glenn Miller
- "My Dearest Dear" w.m. Ivor Novello & Christopher Hassall
- "My Prayer" w. Jimmy Kennedy m. Georges Boulanger & Jimmy Kennedy
- "Night in Sudan" w. Charles Carpenter m. Tommy Dorsey & Jimmy Mundy
- "On a Little Street in Singapore" w.m. Peter DeRose & Billy Hill
- "On The Outside Always Lookin' In" w.m. Michael Carr
- "Over The Rainbow" w. E. Y. Harburg m. Harold Arlen. Introduced by Judy Garland in the film The Wizard of Oz.
- "Palms in Paradise" w. Frank Loesser m. Frederick Hollander Introduced by Dorothy Lamour in the 1940 film Typhoon.
- "Pennsylvania 6-5000" w. Carl Sigman m. Jerry Gray
- "Perfidia" w. (Eng) Milton Leeds m. Alberto Dominguez
- "Run, Rabbit, Run" w. Noel Gay & Ralph T. Butler m. Noel Gay
- "Scatterbrain" w.m. Johnny Burke, Carl Bean, Kahn Keene & Frankie Masters
- "She Had to Go and Lose It at the Astor" w.m. Don Raye & Hugh Prince
- "Sing a Song of Sunbeams" w. Johnny Burke m. James V. Monaco
- "Sing My Heart" w. Ted Koehler m. Harold Arlen. Introduced by Irene Dunne in the film Love Affair.
- "Somewhere in France With You" w.m. Michael Carr
- "South American Way" w. Al Dubin m. Jimmy McHugh
- "South Of The Border" w.m. Jimmy Kennedy & Michael Carr
- "Stairway to the Stars" w. Mitchell Parish m. Matty Malneck
- "Start the Day Right" w.m. Al Lewis, Maurice Spitalny & Charles Tobias
- "Strange Fruit" w.m. Lewis Allan
- "Sunrise Serenade" w. Jack Lawrence m. Frankie Carle
- "Sweet Potato Piper" w. Johnny Burke m. James V. Monaco
- "'Tain't What You Do" w.m. Sy Oliver & Trummy Young
- "Tara's Theme" m. Max Steiner
- "That Sentimental Sandwich" w. Frank Loesser m. Frederick Hollander
- "That Sly Old Gentleman" w. Johnny Burke m. James V. Monaco
- "They Would Wind Him Up And He Would Whistle" Bert Kalmar, Harry Ruby
- "This Is It" w. Dorothy Fields m. Arthur Schwartz
- ""This Is No Dream" w.m. Tommy Dorsey, Benny Davis & Ted Shapiro
- "Three Little Fishes" w.m. Saxie Dowell
- "Till The Lights Of London Shine Again" w.m. Tommie Connor, Eddie Pola
- "To You" w.m. Tommy Dorsey, Benny Davis & Ted Shapiro
- "Too Romantic" w. Johnny Burke m. James V. Monaco
- "Traffic Jam" m. Teddy McRae & Artie Shaw
- "Tuxedo Junction" w. Buddy Feyne m. Erskine Hawkins, Williams Johnson & Julian Dash
- "Two Blind Loves" w. E. Y. Harburg m. Harold Arlen
- "Two O'Clock Jump" m. Harry James, Count Basie & Benny Goodman
- "Under a Blanket of Blue" w.m. Jerry Livingston, Al J. Neiburg, & Marty Symes
- "We'll Meet Again" w. Hughie Charles m. Ross Parker
- "Well, Did You Evah!" w. m. Cole Porter
- "We're Going to Hang out the Washing on the Siegfried Line" w.m. Jimmy Kennedy & Michael Carr
- "What's New?" w. Johnny Burke m. Bob Haggart
- "When You Wish upon a Star" w. Ned Washington m. Leigh Harline
- "Who's Taking You Home Tonight?" w.m. Manning Sherwin & Tommie Connor from the revue Shephard's Pie
- "Wish Me Luck" w.m. Harry Parr-Davies & Phil Park
- "Wishing (Will Make It So)" w.m. B. G. De Sylva
- "You Meet The Nicest People In Your Dreams" Al Hoffman, Al Goodhart, Manny Kurtz
- "You Taught Me to Love Again" w. Charles Carpenter m. Tommy Dorsey & Henri Woode
- "You've Got That Look" w. Frank Loesser m. Frederick Hollander from the film Destry Rides Again

== Classical music ==
=== Premieres ===
Composer	Composition	Date	Location	Performers
Bartók, Béla	Violin Concerto No. 2	1939-03-23	Amsterdam	Székely / Concertgebouw Orchestra – Mengelberg
Bax, Arnold	Symphony No. 7	1939-06-09	New York City (EXPO)	New York Philharmonic – Boult
Bliss, Arthur	Piano Concerto	1939-06-10	New York City (EXPO)	Solomon / New York Philharmonic – Boult
Boughton, Rutland	Symphony No. 3 (1937)	1939-01-01	London	[unknown ensemble] – Pougnet
Britten, Benjamin	Young Apollo	1939-08-02	Toronto	Britten / Toronto Melodic Strings – Chuhaldin
Enescu, George	Orchestral Suite No. 3, "Villageoise" (1938)	1939-02-02	New York City Carnegie Hall	New York Philharmonic-Symphony – Enescu
Ginastera, Alberto	Harp Sonatina	1939-06-26	Buenos Aires	Sebastiani
Harris, Roy	Symphony No. 3	1939-02-24	Boston	Boston Symphony – Koussevitzky
Hovhaness, Alan	Exile (Symphony No. 1) (1936)	1939-05-26	London	BBC Symphony – Heward
Lutosławski, Witold	Symphonic Variations	1939-06-17	Cracow, Poland	Polish Radio Symphony – Fitelberg
Messiaen, Olivier	Chants de Terre et de Ciel	1939-01-23	Paris	Bunlet, Messiaen
Prokofiev, Sergei	Alexander Nevsky, cantata	1939-05-17	Moscow	Gagarina / Moscow Philharmonic – Prokofiev
Prokofiev, Sergei	Zdravitsa, cantata	1939-12-21	Moscow	USSR Radio Symphony – Golovanov
Rosenberg, Hilding	Symphony No. 3	1939-12-11	Stockholm	Swedish Radio Symphony – Rosenberg
Shostakovich, Dmitri	Symphony No. 6	1939-11-21	Leningrad	Leningrad Philharmonic – Mravinsky
Stravinsky, Igor	Le roi des étoiles, cantata	1939-04-19	Brussels	Brussels Radio Symphony – André
Vaughan Williams, Ralph	Five Variants of Dives and Lazarus	1939-06-10	New York City (EXPO)	New York Philharmonic – Boult
Walton, William	Violin Concerto	1939-12-07	Cleveland	Heifetz / Cleveland Orchestra – Rodziński
Weinberger, Jaromír	Under the Spreading Chestnut Tree	1939-10-12	New York City	New York Philharmonic – Barbirolli
Xian Xinghai	Yellow River Cantata	1939-04-13	Yan'an, Vhina	[unknown ensemble] – Wu Xiling

=== Compositions ===
- Samuel Barber – Violin Concerto
- Agustín Barrios – Variations on a Theme of Tárrega
- Arnold Bax – Pastoral Fantasia for Viola and String Orchestra
- Béla Bartók
  - Divertimento for String Orchestra
  - String Quartet No. 6
- Arthur Bliss – Piano Concerto in B-flat
- Eugène Bozza
  - Divertissement for English horn (or alto saxophone) and piano, Op. 39
  - Fantaisie italienne for clarinet (or flute, or oboe) and piano
  - Fantaisie pastorale for oboe and piano, Op. 37
  - Ballade for bass clarinet and piano
  - Fantaisie italienne for clarinet (or flute, or oboe) and piano
- Hanns Eisler – Spruch 1939
- John Fernström – Symphony No. 5, Op. 40
- Karl Amadeus Hartmann – Concerto funebre for violin and string orchestra
- Herbert Howells – Concerto for Strings
- Zoltán Kodály – Variations on a Hungarian folk song "Fölszállott a páva" ("The Peacock")
- Frank Martin – Ballade for flute and piano
- Joaquín Rodrigo – Concierto de Aranjuez
- Hilding Rosenberg – String Quartet No. 4
- William Schuman – American Festival Overture
- Dmitri Shostakovich – Symphony No. 6 in B minor, Op. 54
- Alexandre Tansman – Symphony No. 4
- Heitor Villa-Lobos – New York Sky-Line Melody
- William Walton – Violin Concerto
- Darius Milhaud – Symphony No. 1

== Opera ==
- Gian Carlo Menotti – The Old Maid and the Thief (radio opera)
- Tolib Sodiqov – Leili and Mejnun

== Film ==
- Aaron Copland – Of Mice and Men (1939 film)
- Aaron Copland – The City (1939 film)
- Erich Korngold – Juarez (film)
- Alfred Newman – Gunga Din (film)
- Dmitri Shostakovich – The Great Citizen
- Max Steiner – Gone with the Wind

== Musical theatre ==
- Black Velvet London revue opened at the Hippodrome Theatre on November 14 and ran for 620 performances
- The Dancing Years London production opened at the Drury Lane Theatre on March 23 and ran for 187 performances
- Du Barry Was A Lady Broadway production opened at the 46th Street Theatre on December 6 and ran for 408 performances
- Folies Bergère Broadway revue opened at the Broadway Theatre on December 25 and ran for 121 performances
- George White's Scandals of 1939 Broadway revue opened at the Alvin Theatre on August 28 and ran for 120 performances
- Haw-Haw (Music: Harry Parr Davies Words: Phil Park Script: Max Miller & Ben Lyon) opened at the Holborn Empire on December 22. Starring Bebe Daniels, Ben Lyon and Max Miller.
- The Little Revue London revue opened at The Little Theatre on April 21 and ran for 415 performances
- Magyar Melody London production opened at His Majesty's Theatre on January 20 and ran for 105 performances
- New Pins And Needles Broadway revue (a renamed version of Pins and Needles which opened in 1937)
- Runaway Love opened at the Saville Theatre on November 3 and ran for 195 performances
- Shephard's Pie London revue opened at the Princes Theatre on December 21
- Stars in Your Eyes (Book: J. P. McEvoy Lyrics: Dorothy Fields Music: Arthur Schwartz) Broadway production opened at the Majestic Theatre on February 9 and ran for 127 performances.
- The Straw Hat Revue opened at the Ambassador Theatre on September 29 and ran for 75 performances
- The Streets of Paris Broadway revue opened at the Broadhurst Theatre on June 19 and ran for 274 performances
- Swingin' the Dream Broadway production opened at the Center Theatre on November 29 and ran for 13 performances. A musical version of A Midsummer Night's Dream starring Louis Armstrong, Benny Goodman & his Sextet and Maxine Sullivan.
- Too Many Girls Broadway production opened at the Imperial Theatre on October 18 and ran for 249 performances.
- Very Warm for May Broadway production opened at the Alvin Theatre on November 17 and ran for 59 performances

== Musical films ==
- Babes In Arms, starring Mickey Rooney and Judy Garland
- Balalaika, released on December 15, starring Nelson Eddy and Ilona Massey
- Entre el barro, starring Tito Lusiardo
- East Side of Heaven, starring Bing Crosby and Joan Blondell
- Giliw Ko, starring Mila del Sol, Fernando Poe, Sr., Ely Ramos and Fleur de Lis
- Hawaiian Nights, starring Mary Carlisle, Constance Moore and Johnny Downs. Directed by Albert S. Rogell.
- Honolulu, starring Eleanor Powell, Robert Young, George Burns and Gracie Allen
- Lambeth Walk, starring Lupino Lane
- La vida es un tango, starring Tito Lusiardo
- Love Affair, starring Charles Boyer, Irene Dunne and Maria Ouspenskaya. Directed by Leo McCarey.
- Man About Town, released June 29, starring Dorothy Lamour and Jack Benny, featuring Betty Grable, Phil Harris and Matty Malneck and his Orchestra.
- The Mikado, starring Kenny Baker and Jean Colin
- Naughty but Nice, starring Ann Sheridan and Dick Powell
- Paris Honeymoon, starring Bing Crosby, Franciska Gaal, Shirley Ross and Edward Everett Horton
- Second Fiddle, starring Sonja Henie, Tyrone Power, Rudy Vallee and Mary Healy. Directed by Sidney Lanfield.
- The Star Maker, released on August 25, starring Bing Crosby
- Three Smart Girls Grow Up, starring Deanna Durbin
- Walang Sugat, starring Rosa del Rosario
- The Wizard of Oz starring Judy Garland, Frank Morgan, Billie Burke, Ray Bolger, Bert Lahr and Jack Haley.

== Births ==
- January 3
  - Gene Summers, singer-songwriter (died 2021)
  - Arik Einstein, Israeli singer (died 2013)
- January 9 – Jimmy Boyd, singer and actor (died 2009)
- January 10 – Scott McKenzie, singer (died 2012)
- January 12 – William Lee Golden, country singer (The Oakridge Boys)
- January 19 – Phil Everly (The Everly Brothers) (died 2014)
- January 21 – Wolfman Jack, DJ (died 1995)
- February 1
  - Del McCoury, American singer and guitarist (Del McCoury Band)
  - Joe Sample, American pianist and composer (The Crusaders) (died 2014)
- February 9 – Barry Mann, songwriter
- February 11 – Gerry Goffin, songwriter (died 2014)
- February 12 – Ray Manzarek, keyboard player (The Doors) (died 2013)
- February 16 – Czesław Niemen, Polish singer-songwriter, rock balladeer (died 2004)
- February 28
  - John Fahey, guitarist and composer (died 2001)
  - Tommy Tune, actor, singer and dancer
- March 1 – Leo Brouwer, Cuban composer and guitarist
- March 8 – Robert Tear, tenor
- March 9 – Rohan de Saram, British-born Sri Lankan cellist (died 2024)
- March 11 – Flaco Jiménez, accordionist and singer
- March 13 – Neil Sedaka, singer-songwriter and pianist (died 2026)
- March 18 – Peter Kraus, German singer
- March 27 – Beba Selimović, sevdalinka folk singer (died 2020)
- April 1 – Rudolph Isley, R&B singer (The Isley Brothers) (died 2023)
- April 2 – Marvin Gaye, soul singer (died 1984)
- April 4 – Hugh Masekela, jazz trumpeter (died 2018)
- April 5 – Ronnie White, R&B musician and songwriter (The Miracles) (died 1995)
- April 6 – Beverly Watkins, blues guitarist (died 2019)
- April 16 – Dusty Springfield, singer (died 1999)
- April 18 – Glen Hardin, rock pianist and arranger (The Crickets)
- April 20 – Johnny Tillotson, singer-songwriter
- April 21
  - Ernie Maresca, singer-songwriter and record industry executive (died 2015)
  - John McCabe, composer and pianist (died 2015)
- April 23 – Wizz Jones, guitarist and singer-songwriter
- May 1 – Judy Collins, singer
- May 3 – Jonathan Harvey, English composer (died 2012)
- May 7
  - José Antonio Abreu, orchestral conductor and music educator (died 2018)
  - Johnny Maestro, vocalist (died 2010)
  - Jimmy Ruffin, singer (died 2014)
- May 9 – Nokie Edwards, rock musician (The Ventures) (died 2018)
- May 10 – Wayne Cochran, American singer (died 2017)
- May 14 – Troy Shondell, American singer (died 2016)
- May 19
  - Nancy Kwan, dancer, singer and actress
  - Sonny Fortune, jazz musician (died 2018)
  - John Sheahan, folk musician (The Dubliners)
- May 23 – Michel Colombier, composer and songwriter (died 2004)
- June 3 – Ian Hunter, British rock singer-songwriter (Mott The Hoople)
- June 6
  - Louis Andriessen, composer (died 2021)
  - Gary U.S. Bonds, singer-songwriter
- June 9 – Ileana Cotrubaș, Romanian operatic soprano (died 2026)
- June 11 – Wilma Burgess, American country music singer (died 2003)
- June 16 – Billy "Crash" Craddock, country singer
- June 19 – Al Wilson, American soul singer (died 2008)
- June 25 – Garech Browne, promoter of Irish traditional music (died 2018)
- June 30 – Tony Hatch, composer, songwriter, pianist, music arranger and record producer
- July 1 – Delaney Bramlett, blues singer-songwriter (Delaney & Bonnie) (died 2008)
- July 2 – Paul Williams, soul singer (The Temptations) (died 1973)
- July 3 – Brigitte Fassbaender, operatic mezzo-soprano
- July 5 – Owen Gray, Jamaican singer
- July 6 – Jet Harris, British bassist and singer-songwriter (The Shadows) (died 2011)
- July 14
  - Karel Gott, singer (died 2019)
  - Vince Taylor, rock and roll singer (died 1991)
- July 16 – William Bell, born William Yarbrough, soul singer-songwriter
- July 17 – Spencer Davis, beat musician, multi-instrumentalist (The Spencer Davis Group) (died 2020)
- July 18
  - Brian Auger, jazz fusion keyboard player (Brian Auger Trinity)
  - Dion DiMucci, singer-songwriter
- July 22 – Warda Al-Jazairia, born Warda Mohammed Ftouki, singer (died 2012)
- July 25 – Denis King, pop singer and screen composer
- July 31 – Steuart Bedford, conductor and pianist (died 2021)
- August 4 – Frankie Ford, singer (died 2015)
- August 9
  - Billy Henderson R&B soul singer (The Spinners) (died 2007)
  - The Mighty Hannibal, American singer-songwriter and record producer (died 2014)
- August 13 – Howard Tate, American soul singer-songwriter (died 2011)
- August 15 – Norma Waterson, English traditional folk singer (died 2022)
- August 16
  - Billy Joe Shaver, American singer-songwriter and guitarist (died 2020)
  - Eric Weissberg, American folk musician (died 2020)
- August 17
  - Luther Allison, blues guitarist (died 1997)
  - Ed Sanders, poet and folk singer (The Fugs)
- August 18
  - Molly Bee, American country music singer (died 2009)
  - Johnny Preston, American singer (died 2011)
- August 19 – Ginger Baker, rock drummer (Cream) (died 2019)
- August 24 – Ernest Wright, R&B singer (Little Anthony and the Imperials)
- August 25 – Robert Jager, American composer and theorist
- August 28 – Robert Aitken, composer
- August 30 – John Peel (John Ravenscroft), influential disc jockey (died 2004)
- August 31
  - Jerry Allison, American rock drummer (The Crickets) (died 2022)
  - Cleveland Eaton, American jazz musician (died 2020)
- September 2
  - Sam Gooden, soul singer (The Impressions) (died 2022)
  - Bobby Lee Dickey, singer
- September 5 – John Stewart, folk singer-songwriter (died 2008)
- September 6 – David Allan Coe, American musician
- September 7 – Riccardo Del Turco, Italian singer
- September 8 – Guitar Shorty, American blues guitarist (died 2022)
- September 13 – Gene Page, arranger, producer and conductor (died 1998)
- September 17 – Shelby Flint, American singer
- September 18 – Frankie Avalon, singer and actor
- September 23 – Roy Buchanan, guitarist (died 1988)
- September 28 – Elbridge Bryant (The Temptations) (died 1975)
- September 30 – Len Cariou, Canadian actor and singer
- October 16 – Joe Dolan, Irish entertainer, recording artist and pop singer (died 2007)
- October 18 – Paddy Reilly, folk musician
- October 30
  - Eddie Holland, songwriter (Holland-Dozier-Holland)
  - Grace Slick, vocalist (Jefferson Airplane)
- October 31 – Gordon Bok, singer-songwriter
- November 12
  - Ruby Nash Curtis, American R&B singer (Ruby & the Romantics)
  - Lucia Popp, Slovak soprano (died 1993)
- November 15 – Dinorah Varsi, Uruguayan classical pianist (died 2013)
- November 17 – Yuya Uchida, Japanese singer and film actor (died 2019)
- November 18 – Tom Johnson, American minimalist composer
- November 19 – Warren "Pete" Moore, American R&B singer-songwriter (The Miracles) (died 2017)
- November 22 – Stefan Dimitrov, Bulgarian operatic bass (died 2004)
- November 23
  - Betty Everett, African-American soul singer, pianist (died 2001)
  - Jan Rooney, American singer and wife of Mickey Rooney
- November 25 – Rais Khan, Pakistani sitarist (died 2017)
- November 26 – Tina Turner, American pop singer (died 2023)
- November 28 – Gary Troxel, American pop singer (The Fleetwoods)
- December 1 – Dianne Lennon, American singer (The Lennon Sisters)
- December 4 – Freddy Cannon, American rock musician
- December 8
  - Jerry Butler, African-American singer-songwriter and politician
  - Sir James Galway, flautist
- December 13
  - Andrew Carter, ecclesiastical composer (died 2026)
  - Eric Flynn, British actor and singer (died 2002)
- December 15
  - Cindy Birdsong, soul singer (The Supremes)
  - Dave Clark, beat musician (The Dave Clark Five)
- December 16 – Barney McKenna, folk musician (The Dubliners) (died 2012)
- December 17
  - James Booker, pianist and singer (died 1983)
  - Eddie Kendricks, vocalist (The Temptations) (died 1992)
- December 25 – Bob James, jazz keyboardist
- December 26 – Phil Spector, record producer and murderer (died 2021)
- December 28 – Yehoram Gaon, Israeli actor and singer
- December 30 – Felix Pappalardi, rock producer and bassist (Mountain) (died 1983)
- Alfons Grieder, drummer (died 2003)

== Deaths ==
- January 12 – Hariclea Darclée, operatic soprano, 78
- January 16 – Abe Holzmann, composer, 64
- February 9 – Herschel Evans, saxophonist, 29 (heart disease)
- February 11 – Franz Schmidt, cellist, pianist and composer, 64
- February 12 – Potenciano Gregorio, Filipino musician, 58
- February 17 – Willy Hess, violinist, 79
- March 6 – Emma Juch, operatic soprano, 77
- March 9 – Ernie Hare, US singer, 55 (bronchopneumonia)
- March 21 – Evald Aav, Estonian composer, 39
- April 8 – Emilio Serrano y Ruiz, pianist and composer, 89
- April 15 - Dorothy Morton, soprano and actress, 69
- April 21
  - Herman Finck, composer, 66
  - Joe Young, US lyricist, 49
- May 20 – Alexandra Čvanová, operatic soprano, 42 (car accident)
- June 4 – Tommy Ladnier, jazz trumpeter, 39 (heart attack)
- June 16 – Chick Webb, jazz drummer, 34
- August 1 – Álvaro Sousa, composer, 60
- August 3 – August Enna, composer, 80
- August 19 – Achille Fortier, composer, 74
- August 25 – Geneviève Vix, operatic soprano, 60
- October 9 – Evelyn Parnell, operatic soprano, 51 (appendicitis)
- October 14 – Polaire, singer and actress, 65
- October 16 – Ludolf Nielsen, pianist, violinist, conductor and composer, 63
- October 19 – Marie Renard, operatic mezzo-soprano, 75
- October 24 – Prince Joachim Albert of Prussia, composer, 63
- October 27 – Nelly Bromley, singer and actress, 89
- October 28 – Alice Brady, actress, 46
- October 29 – Giulio Crimi, operatic tenor, 54
- November 3 (or 4) – Charles Tournemire, organist and composer, 69
- November 9 – Charles Goulding, operatic tenor (born 1887)
- December 6 – Charles Dalmorès, operatic tenor, 68
- December 8 – Ernest Schelling, pianist, composer and conductor, 63
- December 18
  - Jeanne Granier, operatic soprano, 87
  - Grikor Suni, composer, 63
- December 22 – Ma Rainey, blues singer, 53 (heart attack)
- date unknown
  - Francisco de Paula Aguirre, composer of waltzes (born 1875)
  - José Perches Enríquez, composer (born 1883)
  - Lena Wilson, blues singer (born 1898)
