= 1939 in British music =

This is a summary of 1939 in music in the United Kingdom.

== Events ==
- April – a left-wing Festival of Music for the People is held in London. Participants include a pageant for 500 singers and 100 dancers featuring the American singer Paul Robeson as soloist, a balalaika orchestra playing Russian tunes, music by Alan Bush, and Benjamin Britten's Ballad of Heroes with words by W.H. Auden and Randall Swingler, performed by "Twelve Co-operative and Labour Choirs". John Ireland's These Things Shall Be is performed at the festival's third concert in the Queen's Hall conducted by Constant Lambert.
- 29 April – Benjamin Britten and Peter Pears leave the UK for North America on board the SS Ausonia.
- 10 May – Heimo Haitto, 13, wins the British Council music prize
- 10 June – the New York Philharmonic, conducted by Sir Adrian Boult, gives the first public performance of Arthur Bliss's Piano Concerto in B flat with soloist Solomon; Arnold Bax's Symphony No. 7; and Ralph Vaughan Williams' Five Variants of Dives and Lazarus, in a concert held at Carnegie Hall.
- 1 September – Henry Wood conducts a concert of Beethoven – the Symphony No 6 and the Piano Concerto No 2 – then announces to the audience that the rest of the season is cancelled, because Britain is at war with Germany.
- 7 December – William Walton's Violin Concerto is given its première in Cleveland, Ohio, United States, by Jascha Heifetz, for whom it was written.
- The Nordstrom Sisters are the resident act at the Ritz Hotel in London.
- The National Gallery, with all its pictures taken to a secure location at the outbreak of war, becomes home of popular lunchtime concerts organised by pianist Myra Hess, assisted by the composer Howard Ferguson and with the enthusiastic backing of the gallery's director Sir Kenneth Clark.

== Popular music ==
- I'll Remember by Reg Connelly, Hugh Rich; Geraldo and The Savoy Hotel Orchestra.
- I'm Sending a Letter to Santa Claus by Spencer Williams and Lanny Rogers, performed by Gracie Fields.
- "Imagine Me in the Maginot Line" w.m. Harry Gifford & Frederick E. Cliffe
- "Kiss Me Goodnight, Sergeant Major" Art Noel, Don Pelosi.
- "On The Outside Always Lookin' In" w.m. Michael Carr
- "Run, Rabbit, Run" w. Ralph Butler m. Noel Gay, performed by Flanagan and Allen and the Harry Bidgood orchestra.
- "Somewhere In France With You" w.m. Michael Carr
- "South Of The Border" w.m. Jimmy Kennedy & Michael Carr
- "There'll Always Be an England" w.m. Ross Parker & Hughie Charles
- They Can't Black Out the Moon, Harry Roy and his Orchestra
- "We'll Meet Again" w. Hughie Charles m. Ross Parker
- "We're Going to Hang out the Washing on the Siegfried Line" w.m. Jimmy Kennedy & Michael Carr
- "Wish Me Luck as You Wave Me Goodbye" by Harry Parr Davies, performed by Gracie Fields

== Classical music: new works ==
- Arnold Bax – Pastoral Fantasia for Viola and String Orchestra
- Arthur Bliss – Piano Concerto in B flat
- Benjamin Britten –
  - Les Illuminations
  - Violin Concerto
- Herbert Howells – Concerto for Strings
- William Lloyd Webber
  - Lento in E major for string orchestra
  - Waltz in E minor for orchestra
- William Walton – Violin Concerto

== Film and Incidental music ==
- Richard Addinsell (orch. Roy Douglas) –
  - Goodbye, Mr Chips.
  - The Lion Has Wings, starring Merle Oberon and Ralph Richardson.
- Eric Fenby – Jamaica Inn directed by Alfred Hitchcock, starring Charles Laughton and Maureen O'Hara.
- Ernest Irving – Come On George!, starring George Formby, Patricia Kirkwood and Joss Ambler.

== Musical theatre ==
- 20 January – Magyar Melody London production opened at His Majesty's Theatre and ran for 105 performances
- 23 March – The Dancing Years London production opened at the Drury Lane Theatre and ran for 187 performances
- 21 April The Little Revue London revue opened at The Little Theatre and ran for 415 performances
- 3 November – Runaway Love opened at the Saville Theatre on November 3 and ran for 195 performances
- 14 November – Black Velvet London revue opened at the Hippodrome Theatre and ran for 620 performances
- 21 December – Shephard's Pie London revue opened at the Princes Theatre on December 21
- 22 December Haw-Haw (Music: Harry Parr Davies Words: Phil Park Script: Max Miller & Ben Lyon) opened at the Holborn Empire. Starring Bebe Daniels, Ben Lyon and Max Miller.

== Musical films ==
- Discoveries – introduced the song "There'll Always Be an England".
- The Mikado, starring Martyn Green as Ko-Ko, Sydney Granville as Pooh-Bah, Kenny Baker as Nanki-Poo, and Jean Colin as Yum-Yum.
- Yes, Madam?, starring Bobby Howes, Diana Churchill and Wylie Watson.

== Births ==
- 8 March – Robert Tear, tenor (died 2011)
- 16 April – Dusty Springfield, singer (died 1999)
- 3 May – Jonathan Harvey, composer (died 2012)
- 6 July – Jet Harris, British bassist, singer and songwriter (The Shadows) (died 2011)
- 17 July – Spencer Davis, singer-songwriter and guitarist (The Spencer Davis Group)
- 18 July – Brian Auger, English keyboard player (Brian Auger and the Trinity, CAB, and The Steampacket)
- 19 August – Ginger Baker, drummer
- 30 August – John Peel, influential disc jockey (died 2004)
- 10 September – Cynthia Lennon, writer, first wife of English musician (Beatle) John Lennon (died 2015)
- 8 December – Sir James Galway, flautist
- 13 December – Eric Flynn, British actor and singer (died 2002)

== Deaths ==
- January – Leonard N. Fowles, organist, conductor and composer, 68
- 25 January – Charles Davidson Dunbar, soldier and bagpipe player, 68
- 8 March – Gertrude Eaton, singer, 78
- 25 April – John Foulds, composer, 58 (cholera)
- 20 July – Sir Dan Godfrey, conductor, 71
- 27 October – Nelly Bromley, singer and actress, 89
- 9 November – Charles Goulding, operatic tenor
- 19 December – Eric Fogg, composer and conductor, 36 (killed by train)
- date unknown – Colin Wark, film composer

== See also ==
- 1939 in British television
- 1939 in the United Kingdom
- List of British films of 1939
