= Pure Gold =

Pure Gold may refer to:

- Pure Gold (Elvis Presley album), 1975
- Pure Gold (Glenn Miller album), 1975
- Pure Gold, a series of budget priced "Greatest Hits" compilation albums and popular LP reissues from several RCA Records recording artists, issued during the mid to late 1970s
- Pure Gold (various artists compilation album), 1973
- "Pure Gold" (song), a 2005 song by Earth, Wind & Fire
- "Pure Gold", a song by Ringo Starr from the album Ringo's Rotogravure
- Pure gold, see carat (purity)
- Puregold, a supermarket chain in the Philippines
