= Our Love =

Our Love may refer to:

== Music ==
- Our Love, a 2021 song from the Arcane soundtrack by Curtis Harding and Jazmine Sullivan
- Our Love (Caribou album), 2014
- Our Love (Twins album), 2007
- "Our Love" (1939 song), a song by Larry Clinton, Buddy Bernier and Bob Emmerich
- "Our Love" (Natalie Cole song), 1977
- "(Our Love) Don't Throw It All Away", a 1978 song by Andy Gibb
- "Our Love", a 2022 song by Coheed and Cambria from the album Vaxis – Act II: A Window of the Waking Mind
- "Our Love", a 1979 song by Donna Summer
- "Our Love", an unreleased song by Drake Bell
- "Our Love", a song by Editors from In Dream
- "Our Love", a song by Incubus from Trust Fall (Side B)
- "Our Love", a song by Krokus from The Blitz
- "Our Love", a 1994 song by Matt Bianco
- "Our Love", a 1985 song by Michael McDonald from No Lookin' Back
- "Our Love", a song by Rhett Miller
- "Our Love", a 2010 leaked song by the Weeknd
- "Our Love", a 2021 song by Curtis Harding and Jazmine Sullivan from Arcane League of Legends

== Film ==
- Our Love (film), a 2000 Hungarian film

Our Love is also contained within:

- Our Love to Admire, the full title of an album by Interpol
- "Where Did Our Love Go", the full title of a song by The Supremes

== See also ==
- "Cinta Kita" (Indonesian for "Our Love"), a 1995 song by Nike Ardilla
