= The Glenn Miller Carnegie Hall Concert =

Live album by Glenn Miller
- Released: December 20, 1957
- Recorded: October 6, 1939
- Genre: Big band, jazz
- Length: 34:59
- Label: RCA Victor

Glenn Miller chronology
| Glenn Miller Plays Selections From the Film "The Glenn Miller Story" (1954) | The Glenn Miller Carnegie Hall Concert (1957) | Pure Gold (1975) |

The Glenn Miller Carnegie Hall Concert is a live album by Glenn Miller and his Orchestra. It documents a live concert recorded in Carnegie Hall in 1939. The album was released by RCA Victor in 1957.

== Background ==
The live album was released in 1957 by RCA Victor as LPM-1506, featuring Glenn Miller and his Orchestra with Ray Eberle and Marion Hutton on vocals. The album documents the band's concert at Carnegie Hall, recorded on Friday, October 6, 1939. Four orchestras performed at New York's Carnegie Hall that night to celebrate the 25th anniversary of ASCAP. Glenn Miller and his Orchestra were the last on the bill to perform. Benny Goodman, Fred Waring, and Paul Whiteman were the other performers on the bill. The Glenn Miller performance was both a popular and critical success. Miller led his orchestra through a program of music that ranged from full-scale swing and romantic ballads. Music critics hailed the concert as Miller's defining moment. Paul Whiteman introduced the band: "It affords me a great joy to have him on this program and to present to you the final band of the night, one of the most popular bands in the United States at the moment, Mr. Glenn Miller"

The album was released in the UK in 1958 by RCA as RD-27057. In 1983, the album was reissued on the RCA International label in Europe as NL 81506 featuring Carnegie Hall and a photograph of Glenn Miller on the cover. In 1993, RCA reissued the album on compact disc.

== Track listing ==
1. "Moonlight Serenade"/"Running Wild" (Glenn Miller, Mitchell Parish)/(Arthur H. Gibbs, Joe Grey, Leo Wood)
2. "Sunrise Serenade" (Frankie Carle, Jack Lawrence)
3. "Little Brown Jug" (Traditional, Arranged by Billy Finegan)
4. "Stairway to the Stars"/"To You" (Matty Malneck, Frank Signorelli, Mitchell Parish)/(Tommy Dorsey, Ted Shapiro, Benny Davis)
5. "One O'Clock Jump" (Count Basie)
6. "Londonderry Air"/"Danny Boy" (Traditional)/(Traditional)
7. "Jim Jam Jump"/"F.D.R. Jones"/"Hold Tight" (Cab Calloway, Frank Froeba, Jack Palmer)/(Harold Rome)/(Jerry Brandow, Leonard Ware, Willie Spotswood)
8. "In the Mood" (Joe Garland, Andy Razaf)
9. "Bugle Call Rag"/"Moonlight Serenade" (Billy Meyers, Elmer Schoebel, Jack Pettis)/(Miller, Parish)

== Personnel ==
The personnel on the recording were: Bass – Roland Bundock, Drums – Maurice Purtill, Piano – J. C. McGregor, Saxophone – Al Klink, Hal McIntyre, Jimmy Abato, Tex Beneke, Wilbur Schwartz, Trombone – Al Mastren, Glenn Miller, Paul Tanner, Tommy Mack, Trumpet – Clyde Hurley, R. D. McMickle, John Best, Legh Knowles, and on Guitar - Richard Fisher.
