= Álvaro Sousa =

Álvaro Corcoroca de Sousa (29 June 1879, Florianópolis – 1 August 1939, Florianópolis), or simply Álvaro Sousa, was a Brazilian music teacher, musician, and composer, whose father was José Brazilício de Souza (Note: The family name of José Brazilício de Souza has a different spelling variety. It can also be spelled as Sousa.) (9 January 1854 – 30 March 1910), the composer of the Brazilian state anthem of Santa Catarina. He was the director of the band that he founded called Amor à Arte. As a music instructor, he also wrote books pertaining to training in music and music theories. Álvaro Sousa was the father of the composer, Abelardo Sousa (18 February 1920 – 27 May 1986).

== Books ==
- Compêndio Elementar de Música
- Dó Sustenido não e Ré Bemol
- Glossário de Termos Italianos Usados na Escrituração Musical
- Nações de Harmonia

== Compositions ==
- A canção da arvore
- Hino da Escola Normal Catarinense
- Iris
- Mikanol
- Rapsódia catarinense
