= This Is No Dream =

Single by Tommy Dorsey and his orchestra
- A-side: "To You"
- Released: 1939
- Recorded: April 17, 1939
- Genre: big band
- Length: 2:43
- Label: RCA Victor
- Songwriters: Tommy Dorsey; Benny Davis; Ted Shapiro

1939 sheet music cover, Bregman, Vocco, and Conn.

"This Is No Dream" is a 1939 song co-written by Tommy Dorsey with Benny Davis and Ted Shapiro and released as a 78 single by his orchestra.

Tommy Dorsey and His Orchestra released the song as a Victor 78, 26234, featuring Jack Leonard on vocals in 1939. According to the tsort.info database, "This Is No Dream" reached No. 9 on the Billboard singles chart in 1939. The song was published by Bregman, Vocco, and Conn in New York.

== Recordings ==
The song was recorded by Harry James and His Orchestra featuring Frank Sinatra on vocals. Charlie Barnet and His Orchestra also recorded the song on RCA Bluebird. 10273, with Judy Ellington on vocals.
