= Trevor Barnard =

British-born Australian pianist (born 1938)

Trevor John Barnard (born 3 January 1938) is a British-born Australian pianist and teacher.

== Life and career ==
Trevor John Barnard was born in London in 1938. He entered the Royal Academy of Music at a young age, followed by private study with Herbert Fryer, a student of Tobias Matthay and Ferruccio Busoni. He later won a scholarship to the Royal College of Music and then studied intensively with Harold Craxton.

Barnard appeared as soloist with the London Symphony Orchestra, the Philharmonia Orchestra, the City of Birmingham Symphony Orchestra, the Bournemouth Symphony Orchestra and various BBC orchestras.

In 1962, Barnard made the first stereo recording of Sir Arthur Bliss's Piano Concerto in B-flat, with the Philharmonia Orchestra under Sir Malcolm Sargent. He also performed the work in concert under the composer's baton in 1963 and 1966. He had earlier played it under Arthur Dennington in 1958.

After moving to the United States, Barnard was pianist-in-residence to the FM station Boston University Radio between 1967 and 1971, and was on the faculty of the New England Conservatory in Boston between 1968 and 1972. He then moved to Melbourne, Victoria, Australia where he was appointed piano tutor at Monash University. He taught full-time and consecutively at the Melbourne State College and the Melbourne College of Advanced Education from 1974 to 1988, and at the University of Melbourne from 1989 until his retirement in 2003.

In Australia he toured and broadcast frequently for the Australian Broadcasting Corporation. Among the composers who have written works for him are Felix Werder, Richard St. Clair, Geoffrey Allen and Michael Bertram.

Barnard was an examiner for the Australian Music Examinations Board (1988-2018), and, as well as many other competitions, served as adjudicator in the ABC Symphony Australia Young Performers Awards on a number of occasions.

Barnard married Elizabeth Helen Richmond in Melbourne on 28 August 1974. Professionally known as Helen Richmond, she was a significant pioneer in the development and appreciation of early music in Australia during the 1960s and 1970s. In recognition of her achievement she was appointed a life governor of the UK-based Dolmetsch Foundation.

== Writings ==
Barnard has written:

- A Practical Guide to Solo Piano Music (2006)
- Neglected Areas of Piano Teaching (2008)
- Several pedagogical papers for the former US refereed keyboard journal Clavier and its successor Clavier Companion.

== Recordings ==
Barnard's discography is not large but it includes some significant diversions from the standard repertoire and some important premieres. He made the first stereo recording of Sir Arthur Bliss's Piano Concerto in B-flat, in 1962, with the Philharmonia Orchestra under Sir Malcolm Sargent. This is still attracting comment as one of the best recordings of the work.

In 1999, Barnard fulfilled a long-held ambition to also record Bliss's Piano Sonata, written in 1952 for the Australian pianist Noel Mewton-Wood, who had impressed Bliss greatly with his playing and recording of the Piano Concerto.

There is also the first commercial recording (1999) of Ferruccio Busoni's 24 Preludes in all the major and minor keys, Op. 37.

Barnard's other recordings present varied programs by Australian and other composers from Bach to the present. These include Dorian Le Gallienne's Sonata and Margaret Sutherland's 2 Suites, and contain a number of world premiere recordings.

Barnard also contributed to an album displaying the artistry of the saxophonist Peter Clinch.
