= 1939 in country music =

This is a list of notable events in country music that took place in the year 1939.

== Events ==
=== No dates ===
- sales recovered to approximately 2/3 of 1929 levels
- Billboard magazine begins publishing its first country music chart. Known as "Hillbilly Hits," the chart appears on a semi-regular (usually, monthly) basis, and will be published until early 1942. It is the predecessor for Billboard's later "Most Played Juke Box Folk Records," which would be published weekly and eventually evolve into today's Hot Country Songs chart.

== Top Hillbilly (Country) Recordings ==
The following songs achieved the highest positions in Billboard magazine's 'Hillbilly Hits' chart, supplemented by 'Joel Whitburn's Pop Memories 1890-1954' and record sales reported on the "Discography of American Historical Recordings" website, and other sources as specified, during 1939. Numerical rankings are approximate, they are only used as a frame of reference.

| Rank | Artist | Title | Label | Recorded | Released | Chart Positions |
|---|---|---|---|---|---|---|
| 1 | Cliff Bruner's Texas Wanderers | "It Makes No Difference Now" | Decca 5604 | September 13, 1938 | September 30, 1938 | US Billboard 1938 #308, US JW #16 for 1 week, 1 total weeks, US Hillbilly 1939 #1, US Hillbilly #1 for 11 weeks, 56 total weeks |
| 2 | Haywire Mac | "Big Rock Candy Mountains" | Decca 5689 | December 14, 1938 | April 1939 | US Hillbilly 1939 #2, US Hillbilly #1 for 7 weeks, 27 total weeks |
| 3 | Light Crust Doughboys | "Pussy Pussy Pussy" | Vocalion 04560 | November 30, 1938 | January 1939 | US Hillbilly 1939 #3, US Hillbilly #1 for 4 weeks, 15 total weeks |
| 4 | Shelton Brothers | ""On The Owl-Hoot Trail" | Decca 5630 | September 18, 1938 | December 27, 1938 | US Hillbilly 1939 #4, US Hillbilly #1 for 3 weeks, 17 total weeks |
| 5 | Gene Autry | "Paradise in the Moonlight" | Vocalion 04810 | April 13, 1939 | May 1939 | US Hillbilly 1939 #5, US Hillbilly #1 for 3 weeks, 12 total weeks |
| 6 | Roy Acuff and the Crazy Tennesseans | "Wabash Cannon Ball" | Vocalion 4466 | November 7, 1939 | February 1939 | US Billboard 1938 #223, US JW #12 for 1 week, 2 total weeks, US Hillbilly 1939 #6, US Hillbilly #1 for 2 weeks, 38 total weeks, 1,000,000 sales |
| 7 | Shelton Brothers | "Knot Hole Blues" | Decca 5653 | September 18, 1938 | February 1939 | US Hillbilly 1939 #7, US Hillbilly #1 for 2 weeks, 20 total weeks |
| 8 | Gene Autry | "South of the Border (Down Mexico Way)" | Vocalion 5122 | September 11, 1939 | October 1939 | US Billboard 1939 #190, US JW #12 for 1 week, 4 total weeks, US Hillbilly 1939 #8, US Hillbilly #1 for 2 weeks, 22 total weeks, 1,000,000 sales |
| 9 | Cliff Bruner | "Truck Driver Blues" | Decca 5725 | August 26, 1939 | September 5, 1939 | US Hillbilly 1939 #9, US Hillbilly #1 for 2 weeks, 20 total weeks, sold more than 100,000 copies. |
| 10 | Gene Autry | "Back In The Saddle Again" | Vocalion 5080 | April 17, 1939 | September 1939 | US Hillbilly 1939 #10, US Hillbilly #1 for 2 weeks, 16 total weeks, 1,000,000 sales |
| 11 | Light Crust Doughboys | "She Gave Me the Bird" | Vocalion 5039 | June 14, 1939 | September 1939 | US Hillbilly 1939 #11, US Hillbilly #1 for 2 weeks, 14 total weeks |
| 12 | Shelton Brothers | "My Sweet Darling Wife" | Decca 5723 | September 19, 1939 | October 1939 | US Hillbilly 1939 #12, US Hillbilly #1 for 2 weeks, 12 total weeks |
| 13 | Roy Newman And His Boys | "I Ought To Break Your Neck (For Breakin' My Heart)" | Vocalion 5175 | June 20, 1939 | October 1939 | US Hillbilly 1939 #13, US Hillbilly #1 for 2 weeks, 10 total weeks |
| 14 | Bob Wills and His Texas Playboys | "San Antonio Rose" | Vocalion 4755 | November 28, 1938 | April 1939 | US Billboard 1939 #267, US JW #15 for 1 week, 2 total weeks, US Hillbilly 1939 #14, US Hillbilly #1 for 1 week, 36 total weeks, 1,000,000 sales |
| 15 | Cliff Bruner's Texas Wanderers | "When You're Smiling" | Decca 5660 | September 14, 1938 | February 1939 | US Hillbilly 1939 #15, US Hillbilly #1 for 1 week, 25 total weeks |
| 16 | Gene Autry | "Little Sir Echo" | Vocalion 4809 | April 14, 1939 | May 1939 | US Hillbilly 1939 #16, US Hillbilly #1 for 1 week, 13 total weeks |
| 17 | Jimmie Davis | "The Last Trip Of The Old Ship" | Decca 5737 | September 2, 1939 | October 1939 | US Hillbilly 1939 #17, US Hillbilly #1 for 1 week, 11 total weeks |
| 18 | Jimmie Davis with Rudy Sooter's Ranchmen | "It Makes No Difference Now" | Decca 5620 | November 6, 1938 | November 30, 1938 | US Hillbilly 1939 #18, US Hillbilly #2 for 3 weeks, 32 total weeks |
| 19 | Buddy Jones | "Ease My Troubled Mind" | Decca 5673 | March 3, 1939 | April 10, 1939 | US Hillbilly 1939 #19, US Hillbilly #2 for 3 week, 22 total weeks |
| 20 | Hoosier Hot Shots | "Annabelle" | Vocalion 4697 | February 8, 1939 | March 1939 | US Hillbilly 1939 #20, US Hillbilly #2 for 3 weeks, 20 total weeks |

== Births ==
- January 12 – William Lee Golden, baritone (and long-bearded) member of the Oak Ridge Boys.
- January 19 – Phil Everly, of The Everly Brothers (died 2014).
- January 24 – Ray Stevens, country-pop singer releasing a long string of novelty-themed songs.
- February 14 – Razzy Bailey, blues-styled country vocalist of the 1980s.
- March 19 – Bob Kingsley, radio personality and longtime host of American Country Countdown and Bob Kingsley's Country Top 40 (died 2019).
- April 20 – Johnny Tillotson, 1960s country singer ("It Keeps Right On a-Hurtin'").
- May 27 – Don Williams, baritone-voiced "Gentle Giant", one of country's biggest stars of the 1970s and 1980s (died 2017).
- June 11 – Wilma Burgess, 1960s country singer (died 2003).
- June 13 – Billy "Crash" Craddock, "Mr. Country Rock," gaining fame in the 1970s.
- August 8 – Phil Balsley, baritone-voiced member of the Statler Brothers.
- August 21 – Harold Reid, bass singer, member of the Statler Brothers (died 2020).
- September 6 – David Allan Coe, singer-songwriter and key member of the outlaw country movement of the 1970s.
- October 27 – Dallas Frazier, songwriter best known for "Elvira".
- October 27 – Ruby Wright, daughter of Johnnie Wright and Kitty Wells and member of their touring show (died 2009).
- December 29 – Ed Bruce, singer-songwriter, best known for writing "Mamas Don't Let Your Babies Grow Up to Be Cowboys." (died 2021)

== See also ==
- Western music (North America)
