= Clive Lythgoe =

British classical pianist

- Born: 9 April 1927; Colchester, Essex, England
- Died: 4 September 2006 (aged 79)
- Occupations: Classical pianist and TV broadcaster

Clive Lythgoe (9 April 1927 – 4 September 2006) was a leading British classical pianist of the 1950s and 1960s, popular in the UK and the United States, where he was considered to be "Britain's answer to Liberace".

== Early life ==
He was born in Colchester, Essex, on 9 April 1927, the son of a Royal Army Medical Corps sergeant major. He grew up at Wimbledon, where he sang in the church choir, and disappointed his parents by shunning a career in law or accountancy. At seven years of age he was entranced by the piano player in a Carmen Miranda film. Some years later, he won a piano scholarship to the Guildhall School of Music and Drama, which marked the start of his musical career. Towards the end of World War II, he joined the RAF. By the 1950s, he had become a regular fixture on the concert circuit.

== UK career ==
Lythgoe was a protégé of Myra Hess, for whom he turned pages. His career breakthrough was under Arthur Bliss in 1954, performing the conductor's own Piano Concerto in B-flat at the first of what were to be many performances at the annual Royal Albert Hall Proms. At the 1955 Cheltenham Music Festival he performed the premiere of Humphrey Searle's Piano Concerto No.2 with Sir John Barbirolli and The Hallé orchestra. He consolidated his reputation when he performed the premiere of Malcolm Williamson's piano concerto at the 1958 Cheltenham Music Festival. He appeared as a soloist with all the leading British orchestras, under conductors including Sir Colin Davis and Zubin Mehta.

In the 1960s, he was the first classical pianist to abandon formal concert attire. The stylish collarless suit which Pierre Cardin designed for him attracted the attention of Brian Epstein, who asked if the Beatles could adopt the same style.

He owned a six-bedroom house in Surrey, a hand-built Bristol 405 sports car, but became increasingly depressive. By the early 1970s, Lythgoe was relying heavily on drugs to get him through performances. During World War II, a bomb had landed in his back garden, decapitating the girl next door and ripping off his piano teacher's arm. Decades later, he claimed to still wake up screaming at the memory.

== US career ==
His 1973 Carnegie Hall debut was critically acclaimed, but Lythgoe spent the two days between the recital and the reviews on Valium. In 1976, five hours of back-to-back recitals in New York almost finished him off, and when Herbert von Karajan offered an engagement playing Brahms' second piano concerto with the Berlin Philharmonic, Lythgoe astonished both the conductor and himself by declining. He recalled that he felt he had reached a "musical menopause". A breakdown caused him to abandon performances altogether, and in 1976, he accepted the post of Dean Of Faculty at the Music School Settlement in Cleveland, Ohio, where he became a well-loved figure, appearing again in his own television series, A Touch of Lythgoe, produced by public television station WVIZ, and playing occasional concerts with the Cleveland Orchestra, some of which were conducted by his friend, Sir Colin Davis.

== Later life ==
Lythgoe increasingly felt his true mission was to bring music to those not privileged enough to attend concert halls. When he settled in New York City, he became director of Horizon Concerts in New York City, a non-profit organisation, and using talented young musicians he gave short concerts mixed with anecdotes to audiences in homeless centres, nursing homes, hospices and schools. He was also the director of the Roosa School of Music, a community music school located on Willow Place in Brooklyn Heights for several years, after which it was merged into another school.

He lived alone in a simple one-bedroom co-op apartment in Jackson Heights, Queens. In 2000, a profile in The New York Times led to renewed media interest and a career revival.

In 2001 he played an all-American concert at the Wigmore Hall in London, where in 1954 he had made his debut.

== Recordings ==
His first Gershwin recording, Music For Pleasure, scaled the pop charts, and won the British "Record Of The Year Award", an award he shared with Sir Georg Solti and The Beatles. His acclaimed recordings of American piano music were added to the permanent collection of the White House Library by President Jimmy Carter.

== Television and radio ==
In England, his TV series, The Lythgoe Touch, ran for 85 weeks, followed by a 52-week BBC radio series, My Piano and I. Celebrity guests included Gracie Fields, who became a close friend and took him with her to perform in New York. In the US, he hosted a TV series, A Touch Of Lythgoe for PBS.
