= In the Middle of a Dream =

1939 song by Tommy Dorsey

- 1939 sheet music cover, Larry Spier, New York

Song by Tommy Dorsey and His Orchestra
- Published: 1939
- Genre: Traditional pop
- Length: 3:13
- Label: Decca 2580A
- Composers: Tommy Dorsey; Einar Swan
- Lyricist: Al Stillman

"In the Middle of a Dream" is a 1939 song composed by Tommy Dorsey, Einar Swan, and Al Stillman. The song became a Top Ten hit in 1939 when released by Tommy Dorsey and His Orchestra.

Tommy Dorsey and His Orchestra released the song as a 78 single, Decca 2580A, matrix number 65876. "In the Middle of a Dream" reached no. 7 on the Billboard chart in 1939, staying on the charts for 10 weeks. Tommy Dorsey and Einar Swan wrote the music, Al Stillman wrote the words. In the U.S., the song was published by Larry Spier, Inc. In the UK, the song was published by the Sterling Music Publishing Co., Ltd., London.

== Other recordings ==
Red Norvo and His Orchestra also released the song as a 78 single in 1939 on Vocalion 4953, matrix number 24802-1. Eddie Carroll and His Orchestra also recorded the song. Jimmy Dorsey and his Orchestra released the song as a Decca 78 single with Helen O'Connell on vocals. Victor Silvester and His Ballroom Orchestra released the song as a Parlophone 78 single. Glenn Miller and His Orchestra performed the song for radio broadcast which was recorded as a sound check. The Miami Pearls Orchestra also recorded the song.
