= Buddy Jones (Western swing musician) =

American singer-songwriter

Buddy Jones (born Oscar Bergen Riley, December 25, 1902 - October 20, 1956) was an American Western swing musician who recorded in the 1930s and 1940s.

== Life ==
He was born in Asheville, North Carolina, and after his father's death moved to Port Arthur, Texas as a child. He began performing in travelling shows with his brother Buster, before settling in Shreveport in the early 1930s. There he began performing on radio station KRMD, and met singer Jimmie Davis. Jones first recorded with Davis in 1931, and continued to perform as a member of Davis' backing band. He made his first recordings under his own name for Decca Records in 1937, and recorded some 80 tracks over the next six years, including country blues as well as risqué honky tonk numbers such as "I'm Going to Get Me A Honky Tonky Baby" and "She's Sellin' What She Used to Give Away". Some of his recordings were duets with Jimmie Davis, and he also recorded with his brother Buster Jones on steel guitar, and with a band including pianist Moon Mullican, fiddler Cliff Bruner and Bob Dunn (steel guitar).

His 1939 recording "Rockin' Rollin' Mama" is notable for the lines "Waves on the ocean, waves in the sea/ But that gal of mine rolls just right for me/ Rockin' rollin' mama, I love the way you rock and roll".

He joined the Shreveport Police Department Traffic Squad in the mid-1930s, and in the early 1940s married and ended his recording career. He died in Shreveport when he had a heart attack while driving and his vehicle crashed.
