= To You (1939 song) =

Single by Ray Eberle, Glenn Miller and His Orchestra
- B-side: "This Is No Dream"
- Released: May 9, 1939
- Genre: big band
- Length: 2:43
- Label: RCA Victor
- Songwriters: Tommy Dorsey, Benny Davis, Ted Shapiro

1939 sheet music cover, Paramount Music, New York.

"To You" is a 1939 song composed by Tommy Dorsey with Benny Davis and Ted Shapiro. The song was a top 10 hit on the Billboard charts.

== Other recordings ==
"To You" was recorded by Glenn Miller and His Orchestra with vocals by Ray Eberle and released as an RCA Bluebird 78. Glenn Miller also performed the song at the 1939 Carnegie Hall Concert, which was released in 1958 by RCA Victor on the album The Glenn Miller Carnegie Hall Concert. "To You" appeared as part of a medley by Glenn Miller and his Orchestra, paired with "Stairway to the Stars", both sung by Ray Eberle at the live performance at Carnegie Hall on October 6, 1939. Glenn Miller recorded "To You" for Bluebird records on May 9, 1939 released as Bluebird 10276-B, with the "A" side, "Stairway To The Stars" both sung by Ray Eberle. Ella Fitzgerald and Paul Whiteman also recorded the song with Joan Edwards on vocals. The song was featured by Harry Richman in the International Casino Revue Hello Beautiful in 1939.

Harry James recorded the song with Frank Sinatra on vocals.

== Billboard charts ==
Tommy Dorsey and his Orchestra released the song as an A side RCA Victor 78 single in 1939, 26234-A. According to the tsort.info database, "To You" reached no. 10 on the Billboard chart, staying on the chart for 7 weeks.

== Sources ==
- Flower, John. Moonlight Serenade: A Bio-discography of the Glenn Miller Civilian Band. Arlington House, New Rochelle, 1972, p. 63 ISBN 978-0-87000-161-1
- Levinson, Peter J. Tommy Dorsey: Livin' in a Great Big Way: a Biography. Cambridge, MA: Da Capo Press, 2005. ISBN 978-0-306-81111-1
- Stockdale. Robert L. Tommy Dorsey: On The Side. Metuchen, NJ: The Scarecrow Press, 1995. ISBN 978-0-8108-2951-0
