= Einar Aaron Swan =

American musician and composer (1903–1940)

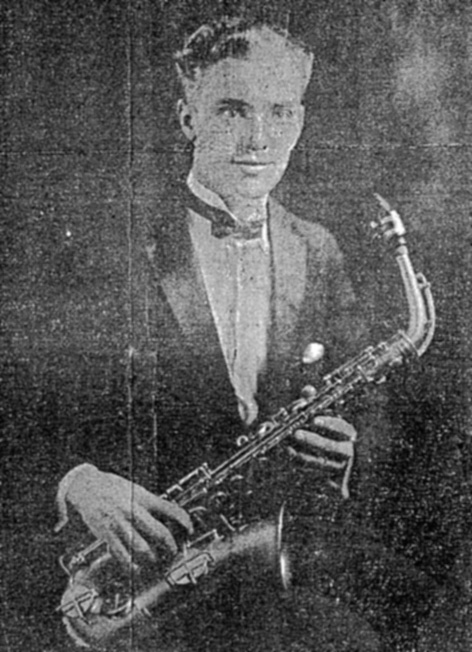
- Einar A. Swan, contemporary news paper photo from the Worcester Telegram.

Background information
- Born: Einar (Eino) William Swan; March 20, 1903; Fitchburg, Massachusetts, United States
- Died: August 8, 1940 (aged 37) Greenwood Lake, New York, USA
- Genres: Big band, swing, jazz
- Occupations: Musician, songwriter
- Instruments: Violin, clarinet, saxophone, piano
- Years active: 1919-1940

Einar Aaron Swan (born Einar (Eino) William Swan; March 20, 1903 – August 8, 1940) was an American musician, arranger and composer. He is known for writing songs including "When Your Lover Has Gone" and "In the Middle of a Dream".

== Early life ==
Swan was born in Fitchburg, Massachusetts to Finnish parents who had immigrated to the United States at the turn of the century; he was the second of nine children. His father was a keen amateur musician and before Einar Swan had entered his teens, he played violin, clarinet, saxophone and piano. At the age of 16 he was already playing in his own dance band, Swanie's Serenaders, and travelling around Massachusetts for three years. Swan's main instrument had been the violin but during this period he switched to alto saxophone.

== Career ==
Around 1924, the bandleader Sam Lanin invited Swan to join his orchestra at New York's famed Roseland Ballroom, and Swan played with leading musicians such as cornettist Red Nichols, and members of The Charleston Chasers Vic Berton (drums) and Joe Tarto (tuba), with whom he soon started composing and arranging material for the orchestra. He also started arranging for the other resident band at the Roseland Ballroom, Fletcher Henderson's orchestra.

After five months with Lanin, Swan joined Vincent Lopez's band in 1925 and went on tour to England. The band at that time also featured Mike Mosiello, Xavier Cugat and his old bandmate Joe Tarto. Shortly thereafter, the Bar Harbor Society Orchestra released "Trail of Dreams" credited to Swan and Raymond Klages.

Around 1930 Swan stopped working as a musician and concentrated on arrangements, starting to work for radio programmes and bandleaders such as Eddie Cantor collaborator Dave Rubinoff and Raymond Paige.

In 1931 he wrote "When Your Lover Has Gone" which was featured in the James Cagney film Blonde Crazy (1931). The song became a hit and has since been covered by many other performers such as Lee Wiley, Louis Armstrong, Ray Charles, Ethel Waters, Billie Holiday, Sarah Vaughan and Frank Sinatra.

In 1939, he composed "In the Middle of a Dream" with Tommy Dorsey and Al Stillman, which was recorded by Glenn Miller and Red Norvo.

== Personal life ==
Swan married, on August 7, 1925, Ann "Billie" Kaufman in Brooklyn. Kaufman's sister, Pauline, was married to lyricist Albert Stillman, with whom Swan would collaborate on "In the Middle of a Dream". At the same time, Swan converted to his wife's religion, Judaism, and changed his middle name from William to Aaron. Swan's conversion exacerbated tensions with his father, who had already been unhappy about Swan abandoning classical music for jazz; his father never spoke to him again after the marriage.

Einar and Ann had two children, Pearl, born in 1926 (later known as Leslie von Roeder), and Donald, born in 1930.

He died of a cerebral hemorrhage in Greenwood Lake, New York in 1940 at the age of 37. After Swan's death, Sinatra donated his royalties from "When Your Lover Has Gone" to Ann, Swan's widow.

== Major compositions ==
- "White Ghost Shivers"
- "Trail of Dreams" (1926)
- "When Your Lover Has Gone" (1931)
- "In the Middle of a Dream" (24 May 1939); Al Stillman (words); Tommy Dorsey and Einar Swan (music)
