= Hino do Estado de Santa Catarina =

Anthem of the Brazilian state of Santa Catarina

Hino do Estado de Santa Catarina (1895) is the anthem of the Brazilian state of Santa Catarina. Horácio Nunes Pires wrote the words and José Brazilício de Souza composed the music. It has lyrics by Horácio Nunes Pires and music by José Brazilício de Souza. The lyrics, by their general abolitionist aspect, have sometimes been considered unrepresentative of the state.

== Lyrics ==
Verse 1

Sagremos num hino de estrelas e flores

Num canto sublime de glórias e luz,

As festas que os livres frementes de ardores,

Celebram nas terras gigantes da cruz.

Chorus 1

Quebram-se férreas cadeias,

Rojam algemas no chão;

Do povo nas epopéias

Fulge a luz da redenção.

Verse 2

No céu peregrino da Pátria gigante

Que é berço de glórias e berço de heróis

Levanta-se em ondas de luz deslumbrante,

O sol, Liberdade cercada de sóis.

Chorus 2

Pela força do Direito

Pela força da razão,

Cai por terra o preconceito

Levanta-se uma Nação.𝄇

Verse 3

Não mais diferenças de sangues e raças

Não mais regalias sem termos fatais,

A força está toda do povo nas massas,

Irmãos somos todos e todos iguais.

Chorus 3

Da liberdade adorada.

No deslumbrante clarão

Banha o povo a fronte ousada

E avigora o coração.

Verse 4

O povo que é grande mas não vingativo

Que nunca a justiça e o Direito calou,

Com flores e festas deu vida ao cativo,

Com flores e festas o trono esmagou.

Chorus 4

Quebrou-se a algema do escravo

E nesta grande Nação

É cada homem um bravo

Cada bravo um cidadão.
