= Kiss Me Goodnight, Sergeant Major =

Song
- Language: English
- Written: 1939
- Songwriters: Art Noel and Don Pelosi

"Kiss Me Goodnight, Sergeant Major" is a humorous song from the Second World War. It was written by Art Noel and Don Pelosi.

In 1973, Martin Page published a compilation of "British military songs without expurgation", titled Kiss Me Goodnight, Sergeant Major! The Songs and Ballads of World War II.

== Lyrics ==
The Roud number is 16962. The final line is "Sgt. Major, be a mother to me".

There was a follow-up: "Good Morning Sergeant Major" (circa 1940).

== See also ==
- 1939 in music
