= Black Velvet (revue) =

London Hippodrome show

Black Velvet was a revue at the London Hippodrome in 1938 which included Roma Beaumont, and Pat Kirkwood singing the celebrated song "My Heart Belongs to Daddy", and vocalist/impressionist Afrique. The show made Pat Kirkwood into Britain's first wartime star and established her career.
