= Pure Gold (Glenn Miller album) =

Compilation album by Glenn Miller
- Released: 1975
- Recorded: 1939, 1940, 1941, 1942
- Genres: Dance band, Swing
- Length: 33:08
- Label: RCA Records

Glenn Miller chronology
The Glenn Miller Carnegie Hall Concert (1958)	Pure Gold (1975)

Pure Gold is a 1975 compilation album of 10 studio recordings by Glenn Miller and his Orchestra recorded between 1939 and 1942 by RCA Victor. The recordings were all originally issued as 78 RPM records on the RCA Bluebird and Victor labels and was certified Gold by the RIAA. The album was originally issued on LP in 1975 and on compact disc in 1984 in reprocessed (fake) stereo sound; in 1988, RCA remastered the album in original monophonic sound for its second CD reissue.

== Reception ==
The album was certified Gold in the U.S. by the Recording Industry Association of America (RIAA) on July 25, 1984.

== Track listing ==
The ten tracks on the album consist of the original RCA Victor studio recordings.

Side One

1. Sunrise Serenade (Frankie Carle) – 3:25
2. A String of Pearls (Jerry Gray) – 3:18
3. In The Mood (Joe Garland) – 3:34
4. Pennsylvania Six-Five Thousand (Jerry Gray) – 3:15
5. Chattanooga Choo Choo (Mack Gordon, Harry Warren) – 3:27

Side Two

1. Moonlight Serenade (Glenn Miller) – 3:18
2. Tuxedo Junction (Erskine Hawkins, Bill Johnson, Julian Dash) – 3:24
3. Little Brown Jug (Joseph Eastburn Winner. Arranged by Billy Finegan) – 2:49
4. (I've Got a Gal in) Kalamazoo (Gordon, Warren) – 3:18
5. American Patrol (Frank White Meacham. Arranged by Jerry Gray) – 3:20

== Personnel ==
The personnel for the April 4, 1939 "Moonlight Serenade" recording session in New York consisted of: Bob Price, Legh Knowles, Dale McMickle, on trumpet; Glenn Miller, Al Mastren, Paul Tanner, on trombone; Wilbur Schwartz, on clarinet and alto saxophone; Hal McIntyre, on alto saxophone; Stanley Aronson, on alto and baritone saxophone; Tex Beneke, Al Klink, on tenor saxophone; Chummy MacGregor, on piano; Allen Reuss, on guitar; Rowland "Rolly" Bundock, on string bass; and Frank Carlson, on drums.

The personnel for "A String of Pearls": Saxes: Babe Russin, Tex Beneke, Wilbur Schwartz, Ernie Caceres, Al Klink; Trumpets: John Best, R. D. McMickle, Billy May, Alek Fila; Trombones: Glenn Miller, Jimmy Priddy, Paul Tanner, Frank D'Annolfo; Piano: Chummy MacGregor; String Bass: Edward "Doc" Goldberg; Guitar: Bobby Hackett; Drums: Moe Purtill.

The personnel for "Sunrise Serenade": Bob Price, Legh Knowles, Dale McMickle, on trumpet; Glenn Miller, Al Mastren, Paul Tanner, on trombone; Wilbur Schwartz, on clarinet and alto saxophone; Hal McIntyre, on alto saxophone; Stanley Aronson, on alto and baritone saxophone; Tex Beneke, Al Klink, on tenor saxophone; Chummy MacGregor, on piano; Allen Reuss, on guitar; Rowland "Rolly" Bundock, on string bass; and Moe Purtill, on drums.

The personnel for "American Patrol": Saxes: Tex Beneke, Wilbur Schwartz, Ernie Caceres, Al Klink, Lloyd "Skip" Martin; Trumpets: John Best, R. D. McMickle, Billy May, Steve Lipkins; Trombones: Glenn Miller, Jimmy Priddy, Paul Tanner, Frank D'Annolfo; Piano: Chummy MacGregor; String Bass: Edward "Doc" Goldberg; Guitar: Bobby Hackett; Drums: Moe Purtill.

The personnel for "Tuxedo Junction": Saxes: Hal McIntyre, Tex Beneke, Wilbur Schwartz, Jimmy Abato, Al Klink; Trumpets: Clyde Hurley, John Best, R. D. McMickle, Legh Knowles; Trombones: Glenn Miller, Tommy Mack, Paul Tanner, Frank D'Annolfo; Piano: Chummy MacGregor; String Bass: Rowland Bundock; Guitar: Richard Fisher; Drums: Moe Purtill.

The personnel for the August 1, 1939 recording session at the RCA studio in New York for "In the Mood": Saxes: Hal McIntyre, Tex Beneke, Wilbur Schwartz, Harold Tennyson, Al Klink; Trumpets: Clyde Hurley, R. D. McMickle, Legh Knowles; Trombones: Glenn Miller, Paul Tanner, Al Mastren; Piano: Chummy MacGregor; String Bass: Rowland Bundock; Guitar: Richard Fisher; Drums: Moe Purtill.

The personnel for "Little Brown Jug": Saxes: Hal McIntyre, Tex Beneke, Wilbur Schwartz, Stanley Aronson, Al Klink; Trumpets: Bob Price, R. D. McMickle, Legh Knowles; Trombones: Glenn Miller, Paul Tanner, Al Mastren; Piano: Chummy MacGregor; String Bass: Rowland Bundock; Guitar: Allen Reuss; Drums: Moe Purtill.

The personnel for "Pennsylvania Six-Five Thousand": Saxes: Hal McIntyre, Tex Beneke, Wilbur Schwartz, Ernie Caceres, Al Klink; Trumpets: John Best, R. D. McMickle, Clyde Hurley, Legh Knowles; Trombones: Glenn Miller, Jimmy Priddy, Paul Tanner, Frank D'Annolfo; Piano: Chummy MacGregor; String Bass: Herman "Trigger" Alpert; Guitar: Jack Lathrop; Drums: Moe Purtill.

The personnel on the May 7, 1941 recording of "Chattanooga Choo Choo" by Glenn Miller and his Orchestra in Hollywood on RCA Bluebird were Paula Kelly, the Modernaires (vocals), Billy May, John Best, Ray Anthony, R.D. McMickle (trumpet), Glenn Miller, Jim Priddy, Paul Tanner, Frank D'Annolfo (trombone), Hal McIntyre, Wilbur Schwartz (clarinet, alto saxophone), Tex Beneke, Al Klink (tenor saxophone), Ernie Caceres (baritone saxophone), Chummy MacGregor (piano), Jack Lathrop (guitar), Trigger Alpert (bass), and Maurice Purtill (drums).

The personnel on "I've Got a Gal in) Kalamazoo": Tex Beneke, Marion Hutton, the Modernaires (vocals), Billy May, John Best, Steve Lipkins, R.D. McMickle (trumpet), Glenn Miller, Jim Priddy, Paul Tanner, Frank D'Annolfo (trombone), Lloyd "Skip" Martin, Wilbur Schwartz (clarinet, alto saxophone), Tex Beneke, Al Klink (tenor saxophone), Ernie Caceres (baritone saxophone), Chummy MacGregor (piano), Bobby Hackett (guitar), Edward "Doc" Goldberg](string bass), and Maurice Purtill (drums).
