= Memory Lane Music Group =

Music publishing company (founded 1923)

- Company type: Private
- Industry: Music entertainment
- Founded: 1923; 103 years ago, in New York
- Founder: Larry Spier Sr.
- Headquarters: New York City, U.S.
- Area served: Worldwide
- Services: Music publishing
- Website: memorylanemusicgroup.com

Memory Lane Music Group is a worldwide independent music publishing company established in 1923 by Larry Spier Sr.

== History ==
The company began in 1923 when Larry Spier Sr., composed "Memory Lane" with Con Conrad, and Buddy DeSylva (words). It was a huge hit, later revived in the 1944 Abbott and Costello film In Society, and was Spier's entry into the music business. In 1928, he, Sam Coslow, and Andy Britt composed the hit "Was It a Dream". With Coslow, Spier formed the music publishing company Spier and Coslow in 1928.

In 1929, the company was sold to Paramount Pictures. The two split, with Coslow becoming a movie producer, and Spier starting a successful career as general manager of Chappell Music. While at Chappell, he was involved in such Broadway hits as Oklahoma!, Bloomer Girl, State Fair, and South Pacific.

In 1938, Spier started Larry Spier Music Publishers Inc. to control "Memory Lane" and other copyrights. Among the songs it published was "In the Beauty of Tahoe" (1941) by Harold Adamson, Joe DiMaggio, and Pierce Norman. His son, Larry Spier, Jr. (1929–2003), began working at the company in 1950, and in 1955, took over as president, picking up where his father left off with The Four Lads hit "Moments to Remember", which reached No. 2 on Billboard in 1955. Larry Spier, Sr. (ne Lorenz or Lawrence Reginald Spier; born April 3, 1901, Manhattan, New York) died on November 10, 1956, at his Central Park West home.

In the 1960s, Larry Spier, Jr., started Memory Lane Music Corp. to represent songwriters affiliated with BMI. In 1979, he started Memory Lane Music Ltd., a UK-based company, to handle foreign administration and British reversionary rights. Memory Lane Music Ltd. Pty was formed in 1982 to manage copyrights in Australia and New Zealand.

The 1970s, 1980s, and 1990s were productive years for the company with several dance hits, including "Babe We're Going to Love Tonight" and "Your Love" by Lime, both certified gold in France and Benelux. "Touch Me", recorded by Cathy Dennis, was a worldwide hit, and awarded "Top Performed Song" by ASCAP in 1991.

In 1985, Memory Lane Music Corp. ventured into the record business, producing "Thinking About Your Love" by Skipworth & Turner. The song reached No. 1 on the dance charts in the United States and the UK. Many reputable catalogs were signed, including those of George Weiss, Ervin Drake, Larry Stock, and Joseph Meyer. In 2003, Larry Spier, Jr.'s, son, Mark Spier, assumed control of the company.

In 2006, Scion Three Music (BMI) and Scion Four Music (ASCAP) were formed by Mark Spier as Memory Lane's contemporary division. Scion has since signed over 30 established and up-and-coming songwriters who have written for Beyoncé, Kelly Clarkson, Jennifer Lopez, Jay Z, Rihanna, Joss Stone, Snoop Dogg, Pink, Mary J. Blige, Swizz Beatz, Koda Kumi, Craig David, and Jo Dee Messina.

In early 2009, Scion North and Scion Arctic (both SOCAN) were formed to handle the publishing of Canadian songwriters. In 2012, Memory Lane Music Group opened an office in Los Angeles, and expanded its headquarters in New York.

In November 2015, Spier Music Publishing merged with September Music to form Memory Lane Music Group.

In September 2017, the family of Haven Gillespie sued Memory Lane for $700 thousand, asking for an 85% stake in his song "Santa Claus Is Coming to Town".

In June 2020, Memory Lane signed an administration deal with Atlas Music Group, which will represent the publisher worldwide.

== Operations ==
Memory Lane Music Group administers the publishing rights of thousands of songs, controlling the libraries of artists including The Blakes and Nola Darling.

=== Songs ===
- "Touch Me (All Night Long)"
- "Fancy"

== Bibliography ==
=== References ===
- ASCAP News (n.d.). "ASCAP Independent Publishers Memory Lane and September Music/Galahad Music Merge" (news blog of ASCAP).
- ASCAP News (2013). "Mark Spier – Publisher Candidate 2013 Board Elections" (news blog of ASCAP). Archived from the original on November 5, 2013 – via Wayback Machine.
- Billboard Pro; Christman, Ed (June 10, 2020). "Atlas Music Group Strikes Admin, Marketing Deal With Indie Publisher Memory Lane" (online blog of Billboard → this article is not in the print ed.). ISSN 0006-2510; OCLC 4769918046 (all editions).
- Billboard (July 26, 2003). "Life Lines: Deaths" – "Larry Spier, 73, of Natural Causes, June 30 in New York". Vol. 115, no. 30. p. 87. ISSN 0006-2510 (publication); ProQuest 227210037 (ABI/Inform, Trade & Industry database) (article).
- Catalogue of Copyright Entries. "Part 3: Musical Compositions." "New Series".
1. Vol. 19. March & April 1924. Nos. 3–4. U.S. Govt. Print. Off. 1924 – via Internet Archive.
  1. "Memory Lane". B.G. De Sylva (words); Larry Spier & Con Conrad (music); ©20 March 1924; E586658; Harms, Inc. U.S. Govt. Print. Off. 1924. p. 240.
- Complete Music Update; Cooke, Chris (September 20, 2017). "New Lawsuit Filed Over 'Santa Claus Is Coming to Town' Royalties".
- Hunt Auctions, LLC (June 14, 2017). "Joe DiMaggio Auction." Lot No. 911. Exton, Pennsylvania.
- Mi2N (Music Industry News Network) – PR & Press Resources for Music (July 30, 2013). "LA Duo Nola Darling Signs With Memory Lane Music Group". MusicDish LLC. Archived from the original on August 20, 2013 – via Wayback Machine.
- New York Times (The) (November 11, 1956). "Larry Spier Dies; Music Publisher; Owner of Concern Here Had Composed Hit Songs – Was Head of Bakery". The New York Times. Vol. 106, no. 36086 (Late City ed.). p. 86 – via TimesMachine. (permalink – via TimesMachine.).
- The 1946 Film Daily Year Book of Motion Pictures (re: The Film Daily) (28th Annual ed.). Arno Press (publisher). 1946 – via Internet Archive (Media History Digital Library). LCCN 71-167701.
In Society – "Memory Lane"
1. "Music Composers" → "Conrad, Con". 1946. p. 469.
2. "Music Composers" → "Spier, Larry". 1946. p. 479.
- Beteille, Fred; Scott, Eric (April 2005). "HFA Affiliate Publisher Profile: Memory Lane Music Group" (PDF). HFA Soundcheck. 5 (3). Harry Fox Agency: 5–6. Archived from the original (PDF) on April 20, 2013 – via Wayback Machine.
- Variety (November 14, 1956). "Publisher Larry Spier Dies in N.Y. at 55; Saw Disc-Name Value". 204 (11). Variety: 53 & 58 – via Internet Archive (Media History Digital Library).
