= José Perches Enríquez =

Mexican musician

José Perches Enríquez or José Perches (1883–1939) was a Mexican musician and composer.

He was born in the city of Chihuahua. He was a skilled pianist and composer, whose musical works included "Secreto eterno", "Vals Capricho", and the dance tune "Tono".

He was granted a pension by Colonel Miguel, governor of the state of Chihuahua, so that he could continue his studies in Mexico City, and devote himself to education and giving concerts.
