= Symphony No. 7 (Bax) =

Symphony by Arnold Bax

Symphony No. 7 by Arnold Bax was completed in 1939 and dedicated to "The People of America". The work received its first performance in Carnegie Hall, New York City, by the New York Philharmonic on June 10, 1939 under the baton of Sir Adrian Boult. It was commissioned by the British Council to be played at the 1939 New York World's Fair, along with Arthur Bliss's Piano Concerto, and Ralph Vaughan Williams' Five Variants of Dives and Lazarus.

The piece consists of three movements:

1. Allegro – Poco largemente – Tempo I
2. Lento – Piu mosso. In Legendary Mood – Tempo I
3. Theme and Variations: Allegro – Andante – Tempo I – Epilogue (Sereno)

The first movement opens with a melodic motive from the clarinets, and the second, slower main motive is introduced almost immediately after. These two motives form a basis for the first subject.

The second movement is in a three-part form, like a one-movement symphony, and the mood is somewhat dignified. It closes peacefully to set up the finale.

The last movement is a theme and variations, something that Bax had not attempted before. After a blustery introduction, a theme is introduced, which is used for the variations. It closes with Bax's shortest epilogue.

The symphony is scored for piccolo, three flutes, two oboes, English horn, three clarinets, bass clarinet, two bassoons, contrabassoon, four horns, three trumpets, three trombones, tuba, bass drum, tenor drum, snare drum, tambourine, cymbals, gong, triangle, glockenspiel, harp, and strings.
