= Afrique (impressionist) =

South African singer (born 1907)

- Born: Alexander Witkin; 2 February 1907; Johannesburg, South Africa
- Died: 17 December 1961 (aged 54); Lambeth, London, England
- Occupations: Impressionist, singer
- Years active: 1927–1950s

Alexander Witkin (2 February 1907 – 17 December 1961), who performed as Afrique, was a South African singer and impressionist who starred in theatre in Britain and the United States in the 1930s and 1940s.

== Biography ==
The son of Russian Jews who emigrated to South Africa in the 1890s, Witkin was born in Johannesburg in 1907. He originally intended to study law, but then trained as a singer, making his debut in South Africa in 1927. In 1930, he performed at a Hebrew Order of David friendly society function in Johannesburg.

He emigrated to England in December 1930, and joined the Vic-Wells Opera Company in 1931. His vocal range allowed him to sing opera parts ranging from tenor to bass, with the result that he was able to imitate both Richard Tauber and Paul Robeson. In 1934, he auditioned for the Windmill Theatre as a variety act. The owner, Vivian Van Damm, wrote that he picked him because of his stage presence, saying: "He had no act, no set routine. He came on dressed in a leopard skin, carrying a spear and made terrifying Zulu noises deep in his throat. From those small beginnings, we built up an act for him and very soon he had a ten-minute spot in each show and was a very big attraction."

He regularly performed on the London revue and cabaret circuit, performing impressions of singers and actors. One of his most popular impressions was of the Prince of Wales; although the Lord Chamberlain said that it was "most undesirable and in very bad taste", he had no powers to prevent performances in nightclubs, though Afrique dropped the impersonation soon afterwards. Afrique made radio broadcasts on shows such as Variety Bandbox during the 1930s and 1940s. He first performed at the London Palladium in 1936, toured South Africa with Larry Adler in 1938, and appeared in the 1939 film Discoveries. In a 1940 British Pathe film clip, he impersonates Maurice Chevalier, George Bernard Shaw, Hitler, and singer Peter Dawson.

He performed regularly in London revues and pantomimes through the 1950s, but became a heavy gambler. He died in Lambeth, London in 1961, aged 54, and was buried at Willesden Jewish Cemetery.
