= Solomon Cutner =

British pianist (1902–1988)

Solomon Cutner CBE
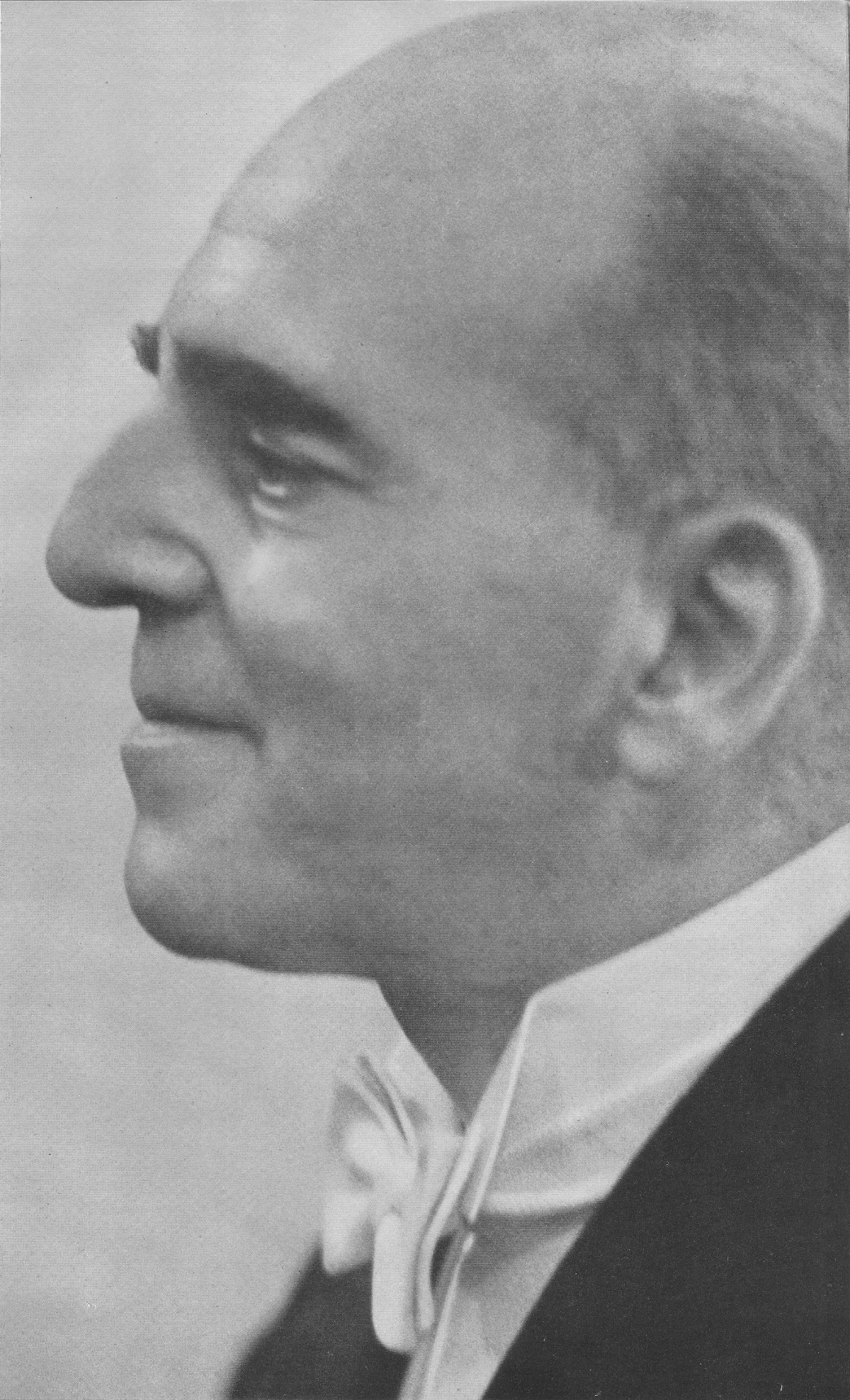
- Solomon Cutner, 1953
- Born: 9 August 1902; East End of London, London, UK
- Died: 2 February 1988 (aged 85); London, UK
- Occupation: Pianist

Solomon Cutner CBE (9 August 1902 – 2 February 1988) was a British pianist known professionally as Solomon.

== Biography ==
Solomon Cutner was born in the East End of London in 1902, the seventh child of tailors of German-Jewish and Polish-Jewish extraction. He was a child prodigy whose talent was recognized at the age of seven when, having had no formal tuition, he performed his own arrangement of the 1812 Overture on the family piano. He made his London debut (performing Tchaikovsky's Piano Concerto No. 1) on 30 June 1911 at the age of eight, but soon retired from public performance during his teens and then resumed his career as an adult performer. He began making records in 1929. As a child he was sent to live with his teacher, Mathilde Verne, who had studied with Clara Schumann. He then studied in Paris with Lazare-Lévy.

After establishing a reputation, he toured abroad a good deal, particularly before, during and shortly after World War II, when he gave numerous much-cherished recitals in the United States and Australia. He premiered the Piano Concerto in B-flat by Arthur Bliss at the 1939 New York World's Fair. Renowned especially for his Beethoven, which had an almost legendary status (he broadcast the entire cycle of the 32 piano sonatas for the BBC), he was in the midst of recording the complete cycle of the sonatas for EMI Records when he suffered a devastating stroke in 1956, which paralysed his right arm. He never recorded or performed in public again, but lived on for another 32 years. His recordings of Mozart, Schumann and Brahms are also highly regarded; his Debussy, Bach and Schubert recordings are likewise esteemed.

He was appointed a Commander of the Order of the British Empire (CBE) in the 1946 Birthday Honours for services to the Forces. He died in London in 1988, aged 85.

A biography, Solo: The Biography of Solomon by Bryan Crimp, was published by APR in 1994, ISBN 978-1-870295-04-8, and reissued in paperback by Travis and Emery in 2008, ISBN 978-1-904331-36-0.

Solomon's first recordings were made in 1929 for the English Columbia label. He later recorded for His Master's Voice. Most of his recordings have appeared on compact disc, either directly through EMI/Warner or under license to the Testament label.

Bruce Eder on AllMusic wrote that, before the onset of his stroke in 1956, Solomon recorded a handful of works in stereo, but whether in stereo or mono his recordings are all worth hearing; he said the clarity, tonal beauty and imaginativeness of Solomon's playing overcomes any shortcomings of the recording technique. He added that Solomon's rendition of Beethoven's Moonlight Sonata is notable for its poetic lyricism and natural, unforced passion.

== Recordings ==
- Solomon: The First Recordings, 1942–43. Frédéric Chopin, Etude for piano No. 9 in F minor, Op. 10/9, CT. 22, Etude for piano No. 14 in F minor, Op. 25/2, CT. 27, Etude for piano No. 15 in F major, Op. 25/3, CT 28., Nocturne for piano No. 8 in D flat major, Op. 27/2, CT. 115, Berceuse for piano in D flat major, Op. 57, CT. 7, Johannes Brahms Variations (25) and Fugue on a Theme of Handel, for piano, in B flat major, Op. 24, Ludwig van Beethoven Piano Trio in B flat major ("Archduke"), Op. 97. Signature Series Records CD, 1994.
- Beethoven: Three Favorite Sonatas – Seraphim Records LP 60286
- Beethoven: Piano Concerto No. 1 in C major – Angel Records LP 35580
- Beethoven: Piano Sonatas Opp. 90, 101, 106, 109, 110 & 111 – EMI Classics CD, 1993.
- Beethoven: Piano Concertos Nos. 2–5; Piano Sonata No. 14 – EMI Classics CD, 1995.
- Schumann, Brahms & Liszt. Schumann, Carnaval for piano, Op. 9. Brahms, Piano Sonata No. 3 in F minor, Op. 5. Liszt, "La Leggierezza" in F minor (Grandes études de concert No. 2), S. 144/2 (LW A118/2), "Au bord d'une source" (II & III), for piano (Années I/4), S. 160/4 & S. 160/4bis (LW A159/4), Hungarian Rhapsody No. 15 in A minor (Rákóczi-Marsch III), S. 244/15 (LW A132/15) – Testament Records, 1996.
- The Complete Recordings of Chopin: Testament Records CD, 1993.
- Solomon Plays Brahms: Piano Concerto No. 1 in D minor, Op. 15, Variations (25) and Fugue on a Theme of Handel, for piano, in B flat major, Op. 24. Testament Records, 1994.
- Mozart: Piano concertos No. 23 in A major, KV488 and No. 24 in C minor, KV 491. His Master's Voice, ALP 1316

A full discography of Solomon's recordings can be found in the biography by Bryan Crimp: Solo: The Biography of Solomon (Appian Publications & Recordings, Hexham 1994), and also in one of the ARSC's journals – as here. Some further recordings have come to light:

- Ludwig van Beethoven
  - Piano Concerto No. 3 in C minor, Op. 37
    - Recorded on 18 December 1952 with the Concertgebouw Orchestra and Eduard van Beinum
- Johannes Brahms
  - Piano Concerto No. 1 in D minor, Op. 15
    - Recorded in 1956 with the RAI Turin Orchestra and Lorin Maazel
- Arthur Bliss
  - Piano Concerto in B♭
    - World premiere performance recorded in Carnegie Hall, New York, 10 June 1939 with the New York Philharmonic-Symphony Orchestra and Sir Adrian Boult
- Robert Schumann
  - Carnaval, Op. 9
    - Recorded in Berlin, RIAS Funkhaus, Studio 7 on 24 February 1956
