= Our Love (1939 song) =

"Our Love" is a 1939 song by Larry Clinton, Buddy Bernier, and Bob Emmerich. It was recorded by Frank Sinatra and was his first recording. Some sources have said that this song was recorded a day before Sinatra married his first wife Nancy or a month later in March. This song did not make Sinatra famous, but in that year he joined the Harry James Orchestra, only to leave a year later to join Tommy Dorsey and his orchestra. It was with Dorsey that Sinatra had his first hit, with I'll Never Smile Again.

Based on Tchaikovsky's Romeo and Juliet, this is one of a group of songs from the Big Band jazz era that were written as popular adaptations of classical music. The song was recorded again in 1960 by George Greeley on his Warner Bros. (WS-1387) album Popular Piano Concertos of the World's Great Love Themes. Sinatra and Greeley joined the Tommy Dorsey band on the same day, and worked together for a year.

== See also ==
- List of songs recorded by Frank Sinatra
- Larry Clinton
