= Piano Concerto (Bliss) =

Concerto by Arthur Bliss

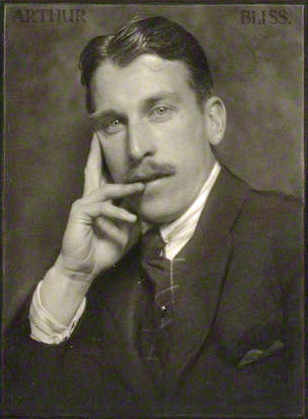
Arthur Bliss c. 1922 (photograph by Herbert Lambert)

The Piano Concerto in B♭ major, Op. 58, F.108, was written by Arthur Bliss in 1938 and premiered in 1939. It is a powerful work in the nineteenth-century Romantic tradition, and at the time it was hoped it could prove to be a British "Emperor" concerto. Nicolas Slonimsky described it as "Lisztomorphic in its sonorous virtuosity, Chopinoid in its chromatic lyricism, and Rachmaninovistic in its chordal expansiveness".

== Background ==
Arthur Bliss had adjudicated at the Ysaye International Competition for Pianists in Belgium in 1938 and was particularly impressed with some of the competitors' performances. He wrote to his wife at the time:

I have heard twenty-two pianists play the same piece by Bach, the same piece by Scarlatti, and expect to hear them sixty-three times more. Never again! ... I am learning a lot by listening to these young players — the standard is high — and my Piano Concerto is going to benefit from the experience. ... Hearing hour after hour of so much brilliant piano playing made me wish to write an extended work for the instrument myself. I must have put intensive concentration into the wish, for almost immediately afterwards the opportunity arose.

The opportunity was a commission from the British Council for a piano concerto to be performed during British Week at the 1939 New York World's Fair with the pianist Solomon as soloist.

Bliss was then at the height of his powers – he had recently completed Checkmate, a ballet brimful of exuberant vitality. Solomon worked closely with the composer on the scoring and engraving of the work.

== Premiere ==
Its premiere was given on 10 June 1939 by the British pianist Solomon, with the New York Philharmonic under Sir Adrian Boult, in Carnegie Hall. It was also Solomon's United States debut. The premiere performance of the Bliss Piano Concerto was recorded, has been remastered and is now available.

The other works commissioned for the occasion and given their premieres that night were Sir Arnold Bax's Seventh Symphony and Ralph Vaughan Williams' Five Variants of Dives and Lazarus.

The UK premiere was also given by Solomon, at the Queen's Hall, London, with the BBC Symphony Orchestra under Sir Henry Wood, on 17 August 1939.

== Dedication and American links ==
The Concerto was dedicated to the people of the United States. In his program notes, Bliss wrote: "It was to be played by Solomon and dedicated to the people of the U.S. so obviously it had to be a concerto in the grand manner and what is loosely called 'romantic". Surely the Americans are at heart the most romantic in the world".

Bliss had strong links with America. Both his father and his wife were American. He spent the years 1923–25 with his father in California, mainly conducting, performing, lecturing and writing. It was during that period that he met and married his wife, Trudy Hoffmann.

After the concerto's premiere, Bliss and his family (they now had two daughters) remained in the United States for some time (he taught at Berkeley). They were there when war broke out in Europe in September 1939. He remained there until 1941, but his wife and daughters were not able to return to England until 1943.

== Structure ==
The concerto takes about 38 minutes. The outer movements abound with big swaggering themes whereas the central movement is somewhat calmer. The theme of the finale is related to both the foregoing movements.

1. Allegro con brio
2. Adagietto
3. Andante maestoso – Molto vivace

The first movement opens with a formidable and bravura octave passage. The second movement is lyrical and meditative, it achieves an other-worldly feeling towards the end. The latter part of the last movement is a kind of moto perpetuo or tarantella, interrupted by quieter episodes.

== Performers ==
The Piano Concerto was immediately taken into the repertoire of pianists such as Noel Mewton-Wood, Ruth Gipps, Clive Lythgoe, Shulamith Shafir and Kendall Taylor. Solomon played it again at the Proms in 1942. Alicia de Larrocha was playing it as early as 1949 (when she was age 26) at the work's premiere in Spain. Trevor Barnard played it in 1958 (when he was aged 20). Gina Bachauer played it with Dimitri Mitropoulos and the New York Philharmonic in 1960. Bliss himself conducted Frank Wibaut in a performance with the Leicestershire Schools Symphony Orchestra at the 1970 Cheltenham Festival. An earlier concert performance of the concerto was also given at Loughborough, again with Bliss conducting. Later pianists to embrace the work include Piers Lane.

Bliss was so impressed with Noel Mewton-Wood's many performances and his 1952 recording of the Piano Concerto under Walter Goehr that later the same year he wrote his Piano Sonata for the young Australian pianist (who committed suicide before he was able to make a recording of it).

== Recordings ==
The Bliss Piano Concerto has been recorded a number of times:

- Solomon, New York Philharmonic, Sir Adrian Boult (world premiere performance; 10 June 1939)
- Solomon, Royal Liverpool Philharmonic, Sir Adrian Boult (January 1943, produced by Walter Legge)
- Noel Mewton-Wood, Utrecht Symphony Orchestra, Walter Goehr
- Trevor Barnard, Philharmonia Orchestra, Sir Malcolm Sargent (1962)
- John Ogdon, from a live performance with the BBC Symphony Orchestra, composer conducting, at the Royal Albert Hall (2 August 1966, in a Bliss birthday concert)
- Philip Fowke, Royal Liverpool Philharmonic, David Atherton (1980)
- Peter Donohoe, Royal Scottish National Orchestra, David Lloyd-Jones
