= Five Variants of Dives and Lazarus =

1939 work by Ralph Vaughan Williams

- by Ralph Vaughan Williams
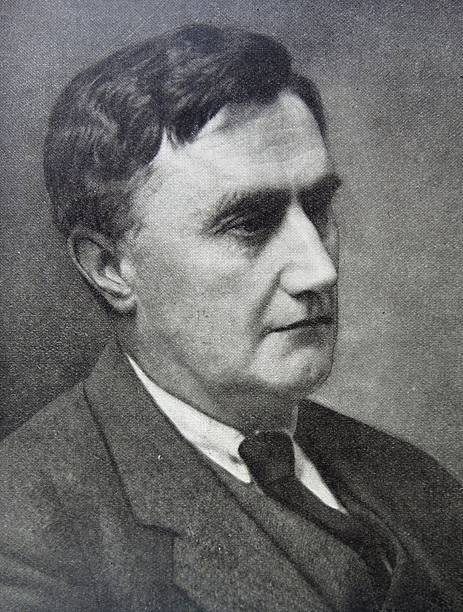
- Portrait of Ralph Vaughan Williams by Herbert Lambert in the 1920s
- Dedication: "The People of the United States of America" (not in published score)
- Publisher: Oxford University Press
- Duration: c. 13 minutes

Premiere
- Date: 10 June 1939
- Location: Carnegie Hall, New York City, New York, US
- Conductor: Sir Adrian Boult
- Performers: New York Philharmonic-Symphony Orchestra

Five Variants of Dives and Lazarus is a work for string orchestra and harp composed in 1939 by Ralph Vaughan Williams. It is based on the English folk song "Dives and Lazarus". According to varying personal recollections, Vaughan Williams first heard the song either in 1893 or 1898. He subsequently transcribed several versions of it during his ethnomusicological surveys, one of which he included in The English Hymnal in 1906. He also quoted the melody in the first movement of his English Folk Song Suite in 1923.

The Five Variants of Dives and Lazarus was commissioned by the British Council for the 1939 New York World's Fair's scheduled classical music events at its Hall of Music. A budget deficit from lack of public interest forced a change of venue to Carnegie Hall, where the New York Philharmonic-Symphony Orchestra conducted by Sir Adrian Boult premiered the work on 10 June 1939. In 1949, Vaughan Williams adapted it for his score to a short documentary by Humphrey Jennings. It was played at Vaughan Williams' funeral in 1958.

== Background ==
=== Early encounters and uses ===
Vaughan Williams in his Musical Autobiography said that he first heard the folk song "Dives and Lazarus" in 1893. He recalled therein that when he first listened to it, he felt "that sense of recognition—here's something which I have known all my life, only I didn't know it!" He described his initial reaction to the song similarly in an essay titled "Let us Remember... Early Days" published in 1940, although there he recalled hearing the song for the first time in 1898. He elaborated on his initial reactions:

I felt like this when I later heard Wagner, when I first saw Michael Angelo's [sic] Night and Day, [and] when I first visited Stonehenge. I immediately recognised these things which had always been part of my unconscious self. The tinder was there, it only wanted the spark to set it ablaze... So when I first played through "Lazarus", I realised that this was what we had all been waiting for—something which we knew already—something which had always been with us if we had only known it; something entirely new, yet absolutely familiar.

Vaughan Williams subsequently transcribed several versions of the song during his ethnomusicological surveys. One of these he heard in 1904, in the village of Kingsfold, near the town of Horsham. It was this version that he included in The English Hymnal in 1906, bearing the title "Kingsfold". In 1923, he quoted the melody in the first movement of his English Folk Song Suite.

=== Composition and premieres ===
Vaughan Williams composed the Five Variants of Dives and Lazarus on commission from the British Council for the 1939 New York World's Fair. It was originally intended to be premiered at the fair's Hall of Music as part of a series of classical music concerts that would have lasted through October 1939. Budget deficits and lack of interest from fair patrons forced organizers to cancel these concerts or move them to alternative venues.

As a result, the New York Philharmonic-Symphony Orchestra premiered the Five Variants of Dives and Lazarus at Carnegie Hall on 10 June 1939, conducted by Sir Adrian Boult; it shared the programme with a performance of Vaughan Williams' Suite for Pipes and the world premiere of the Piano Concerto by Arthur Bliss. Although the programme notes stated that Bliss' Piano Concerto and Vaughan Williams' Five Variants of Dives and Lazarus were "specially composed for this occasion and dedicated to: 'The People of the United States of America'", this dedication does not appear in the latter's printed score. The premiere performance occurred during a heat wave, which Boult later said posed difficulties for the musicians and audience because of the lack of air conditioning in the hall.

Boult also conducted the first British performance on 1 November 1939 at Colston Hall in Bristol, where his orchestra, the BBC Symphony Orchestra, had been temporarily evacuated because of World War II; the concert was broadcast. Altogether, Boult conducted the work five times. In 1975, near the end of his career, EMI proposed to him that he should record the work, but this plan was not realized.

== Music ==
=== Instrumentation and structure ===
The Five Variants of Dives and Lazarus is scored for string orchestra and harp, of which the score requests two if possible. It is published by Oxford University Press. Its structure, key and tempo markings are as follows:

- Introduction and Theme. Adagio. B modal minor
- Variant I: B modal minor
- Variant II: Allegro moderato. B modal minor
- Variant III: D modal minor
- Variant IV: L'istesso tempo
- Variant V: Adagio. B modal minor

According to Vaughan Williams, his variants "are not exact replicas of traditional tunes, but rather reminiscences of various versions in my own collection and those of others".

=== Duration ===
A typical performance lasts approximately thirteen minutes.

== Reception ==
Olin Downes, who reviewed the world premiere of Five Variants of Dives and Lazarus for the New York Times, said that the concert was well attended and that the audience reacted very enthusiastically to Vaughan Williams' music, despite the heat:

The second novelty [on the programme] was Vaughan Williams' setting of the old English carol ... "Dives and Lazarus". Five variants are woven on this beautiful old air. The variants are in character with the air and stick closely to it. They also cause Mr Williams [sic] to return after recent excursions in other fields to modal harmonization and modal counterpoint, which he loves and he writes so well ... At the same time, there is variety of pace and mood, sometimes gay, sometimes reflective, always poetical.

James Day, in his biography of Vaughan Williams, described the Five Variants of Dives and Lazarus as a "cross between a folk song arrangement and original composition". He compared it favorably to the Fantasia on a Theme by Thomas Tallis and said that it may have influenced the design of the opening movement of the composer's Sixth Symphony.

In his overview of Vaughan Williams' music, the music critic Michael Kennedy called the Five Variants of Dives and Lazarus a "labour of love" that "[mused] upon shapes and aspects of the great folk song he had known from his childhood". It was played at Vaughan Williams' funeral in 1958, conducted by Boult. Kennedy recalled the performance:

Into the silence of [Westminster] Abbey came the first notes Five Variants of Dives and Lazarus. It was as if Vaughan Williams himself had spoken. The tune which he had loved all his life, which came from the soil of England, ageless and anonymous, which he had used in so many of his own compositions, was the perfect choice to create a mood of remembrance which will haunt those who experienced it to the end of their days.

In 2021, the work ranked No. 56 in that year's Classic FM Hall of Fame.

== Adaptation ==
In 1949, Vaughan Williams composed music for a short documentary film directed by Humphrey Jennings titled Dim Little Island. With the assistance of Doreen Carwithen, Vaughan Williams adapted extensive portions of the Five Variants of Dives and Lazarus, with additional scoring for clarinet and voice, for the documentary's score. The musicologist Annika Forkert described the results as "[blurring] the boundaries between resemblance and identity" of the original work and its soundtrack adaption.
