= Ted Shapiro =

American composer and publisher of popular music (1899–1980)

- Born: October 31, 1899; New York City, New York, United States
- Died: May 26, 1980 (aged 80) Bay Harbor, Florida, United States
- Occupation(s): Pianist; Songwriter
- Instrument: Piano

Ted Shapiro (October 31, 1899 – May 26, 1980) was a United States popular music composer, pianist, and sheet music publisher.

== Early life ==
Shapiro was born on October 31, 1899, in New York City. He became a Tin Pan Alley songwriter and accompanied notable star vaudeville singers of the day, including Nora Bayes and Eva Tanguay. Shapiro was hired as accompanist and music director for Sophie Tucker; replacing the "Five Kings of Syncopation" on her 1922 tour to London. Shapiro worked with Tucker until her death in 1966, appearing at the piano on stage with her, exchanging banter and wisecracks between songs. Shapiro also wrote a number of songs for Tucker.

== Popular compositions ==
Ted Shapiro became a member of ASCAP in 1924. His biggest hits were the holiday standard "Winter Weather" from 1941, and "If I Had You", first published in 1928, which continues to be covered by new recording artists and used in movie soundtracks into the 21st century. His other successful tunes and songs include "He's Home for a Little While", "A Handful of Stars", "To You", written with Tommy Dorsey and Benny Davis, "Far Away Island", "Sitting in the Sand A-Sunnin'", "Now I'm In Love", ""You'll Be Reminded of Me", "Starlight Souvenirs", "This is No Dream", "Dog on the Piano", "Puttin' On the Dog", "Waitin' for Katy", and "Ask Anyone in Love".

== Personal ==
Ted Shapiro was one of at least three children of Joseph and Jennie Shapiro. His parents were Jewish immigrants from Kovno, Russia (now Kaunas, Lithuania). He was married twice. He married Joan Max of Miami, Florida in Chicago, Illinois, on May 17, 1936. On December 20, 1953, he married Susan Frazier in Miami Shores, Florida.

Shapiro retired to Bay Harbor, Florida in 1966 following the death of Sophie Tucker. There his wife Susan Shapiro (b. November 4, 1923), a jewelry designer, owned and operated a store called Trifles and Treasures on Kane Concourse. Some of his songs were written in collaboration with his wife Susan. Ted adopted Susan's three children: John, Lynn and Jennifer. John and Lynn are Susan's biological children, while Jennifer was adopted.

Ted Shapiro died on May 26, 1980, at his home in Bay Harbor, Florida, at age of 80.
