= Young Marble Giants =

Welsh post-punk band

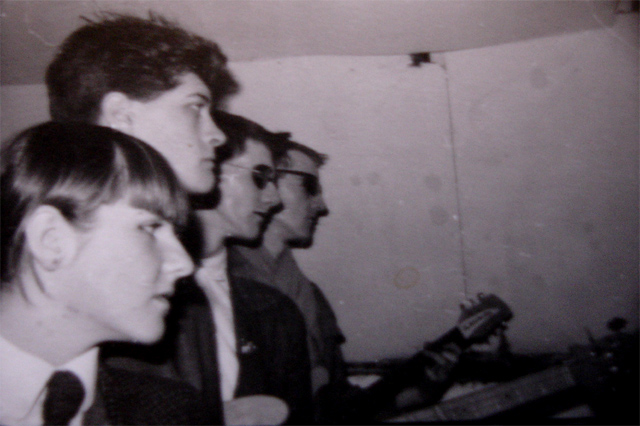
- Alison Statton, Peter Joyce, Philip Moxham, Stuart Moxham c. 1978/79

Background information
- Origin: Cardiff, Wales
- Genres: Post-punk
- Years active: 1978–1981 (Reunions: 2003, 2007–2009, 2012, 2014, 2015)
- Labels: Z Block Records; Rough Trade; Domino
- Spinoffs: Weekend
- Past members: Philip Moxham; Stuart Moxham; Alison Statton; Peter Joyce; Andrew Moxham

Young Marble Giants were a Welsh post-punk band formed in Cardiff, Wales, in 1978. Their music was based around the vocals of Alison Statton along with the minimalist instrumentation of brothers Philip and Stuart Moxham. Their early sound was a sharp contrast with the more aggressive punk rock that dominated the underground at the time. Young Marble Giants released just one studio album, Colossal Youth, in 1980. They also released two EPs and recorded a John Peel session.

== History ==
Members of Young Marble Giants had previously been in a band called True Wheel. Stuart Moxham's girlfriend, Wendy Smith, lent him the money to buy his Rickenbacker. (Smith, an art student in Cardiff at the time Young Marble Giants formed, photographed the band's US tour, and also designed cover art for several singles and albums by Weekend.)

Very early in their existence, there was a fourth member of the band, Peter Joyce, who was a cousin of the Moxham brothers. Joyce was a telephone engineer and skilled at electronics, and had made his own synthesiser from a kit. It made sounds similar to Eno's synths in the early Roxy Music, and Kraftwerk, both of which employed similar 'low-tech/high-tech' electronics. Young Marble Giants used tape recordings of Joyce's home-made drum machine, since they did not wish to have a drummer at that time. They were also interested in effects devices such as ring modulators and reverb units, with the emphasis always on simplicity.

Their first vinyl release was on the compilation LP Is the War Over? on Cardiff DIY label, Z Block Records, in October 1979. While signed to UK independent record label, Rough Trade Records the YMGs released two EPs, Final Day and Testcard, and an album, Colossal Youth (a reference to the Early Greek 'Kouroi' marble statues, from which the YMGs took the inspiration for their name.) The artwork of the album was inspired by the Beatles album, With the Beatles.

The band toured Europe and North America and played in Berlin, Los Angeles, San Francisco, Vancouver and New York. Touring companions included the band Cabaret Voltaire. In September 1980, they played the gothic rock Futurama Festival in Leeds.

== Post-breakup projects ==
After the band split up in 1981, Stuart Moxham formed the Gist, whose song Love at First Sight became a hit in continental Europe, when covered by French pop singer Étienne Daho, under the title Paris, Le Flore. Following a very severe motorbike accident Stuart concentrated on home recording, which resulted in the album Embrace the Herd (1982) again on Rough Trade, and his first CD album Signal Path (1992) on the Chicago-based Feel Good All Over label, before fans persuaded him to enter the studio again. The result was the album Random Rules (1993) and featured Spike (guitar and viola), younger brother Andrew (drums) and London-based French songwriter Louis Philippe (keyboard and arrangements). A band was formed to perform Stuart's new material, which gigged, albeit briefly, in France and the UK. Another album, Cars in the Grass, followed. Stuart had also been recording in the US (the album Fine Tuning and six tracks on the album Barbara Manning Sings with the Original Artists (1993)), where he has acquired a small fanbase. Now based in the West Country, Moxham is still writing songs. A new album, The Huddle House, recorded as a duet with Philippe, with whom he has regularly performed, was released on Wonder Records in May 2007.

Alison Statton, Spike and Simon Emmerson (later of Working Week and Afro Celt Sound System) formed Weekend (with Phil Moxham on bass) and several jazz musicians including Larry Stabbins, Harry Beckett and Keith Tippett.

In 1989 and 1990, Alison Statton worked with Ian Devine, the former guitarist of the post-punk group Ludus. They released two records together, The Prince of Wales and Cardiffians. Blaine L. Reininger of Tuxedomoon was a featured performer on The Prince of Wales.

Later, Philip Moxham played bass for the Communards and Everything but the Girl. He featured on the latter's second UK album, Love Not Money, and toured with EBTG in 1985 to promote it. He also worked with David Thomas and the Pedestrians.

== Reformation ==
In early 2003, Statton and the Moxham brothers reunited for a BBC Radio Wales special. They performed one new song, "Alright".

A reunion show was held in Hay-on-Wye on 27 May 2007, part of the Hay-on-Wye Festival, with Stuart Moxham's website explaining: "Young Marble Giants reform for a one-off celebration of Domino Records' re-release of their album Colossal Youth, combined in a triple CD package with the Lo-Fi, private reference recordings of the Salad Days album and the otherwise unobtainable Peel Sessions."

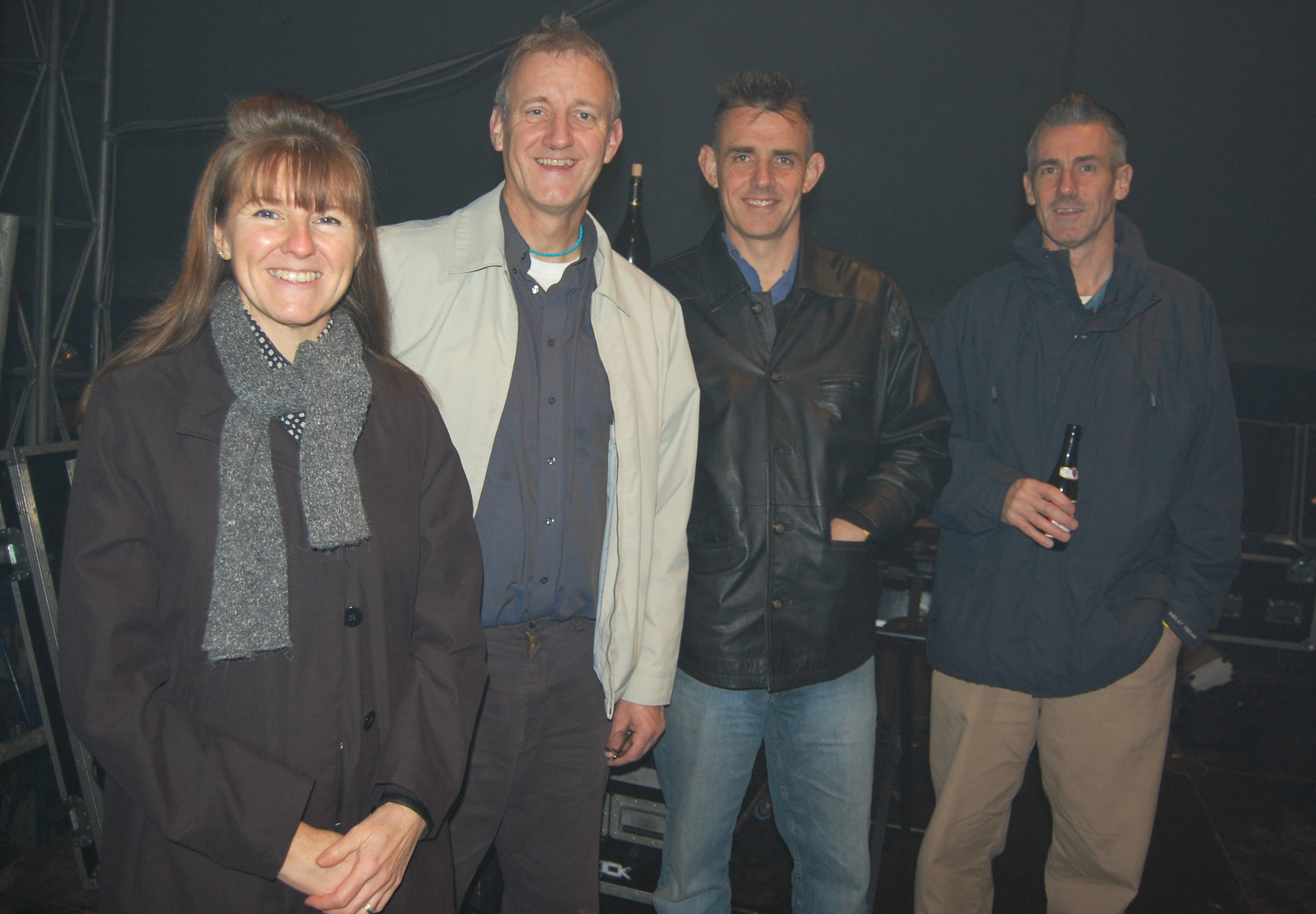
The band after the gig at Nivelles, Belgium, November 2008

Hay-on-Wye was not a one-off. Convinced by the booking agency, the band also played a show for the BB-Mix Festival in Boulogne-Billancourt, just outside Paris, on 28 October 2007. Instead of the drum machine they had originally used, younger Moxham brother Andrew joined the group playing an electronic-drumkit.

The band continued to perform over this period, including appearances at the Primavera Sound Festival on 31 May 2008, and at the Hebbel am Ufer Theatre in Berlin on 16 January 2009. The Young Marble Giants played the entirety of Colossal Youth at All Tomorrow's Parties in Minehead, Somerset, on 9 May 2009 – they were chosen by Jeff Mangum of Neutral Milk Hotel for a return performance at the All Tomorrow's Parties festival that he curated in March 2012, again in Minehead.

The band played gigs at the Dancehouse Theatre in Manchester on 19 October 2014 and Stereo in Glasgow on 20 October.

They also performed at the MIMI Festival, on the Frioul Island in Marseille, on 3 July 2015.

On 8 June 2016, Stuart Moxham wrote on the band's Facebook page that the band was no more. Young Marble Giants' last show was in London in August 2015.

== Style and influences ==
Young Marble Giants' sound was characterised by Phil's prominent bass lines, Stuart's rhythm guitar (a Rickenbacker 425) and Galanti electric organ lines and Statton's vocals.

Musical influences included Eno, Kraftwerk, Neil Young, Lou Reed, the Velvet Underground, Roxy Music, David Bowie, Can and others. Stuart Moxham was a fan of Manchester guitarist Vini Reilly's early work, and was also very interested in dub reggae. The band were acquainted with Scritti Politti, the band of Cardiff native Green Gartside, and signed to the same label, Rough Trade Records.

== Legacy ==
Young Marble Giants have had a lasting influence on many other groups and artists. It was revealed in his Journals that they were, along with the Vaselines, one of Kurt Cobain's two favourite bands. Courtney Love's band Hole covered the Young Marble Giants track "Credit in the Straight World"; a cover version of their song "The Man Amplifier" was included on the Magnetic Fields single "Why I Cry" as a B-side; Sydney group Toys Went Berserk covered the song "Brand-New-Life" in 1990. "N.I.T.A." was covered by Versus. "Final Day" was covered by both Belle and Sebastian and Galaxie 500. The original recording of the song was included in The Pitchfork 500.

== Discography ==
=== Studio albums ===
- Colossal Youth (February 1980)
  - Reached No. 3 on the UK Indie Chart, No. 20 NZ

=== EPs ===
- Final Day (June 1980)
  - Reached No. 6 on the UK Indie Chart
- Testcard E.P. EP (March 1981)
  - Reached No. 2 on the UK Indie Chart

=== Live recordings ===
- Peel Sessions (recorded 1980, released 1991)
- Live at the Hurrah! (2004)

=== Compilation albums ===
- Salad Days (2000)
  - Compilation of demo versions of songs which appeared on Colossal Youth and Testcard

== Gallery ==
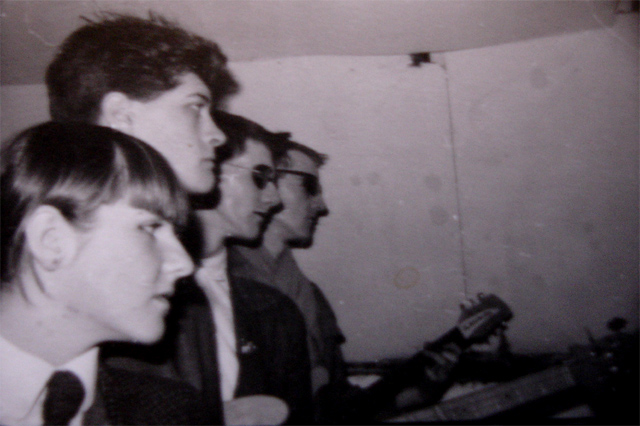
Alison Statton, Peter Joyce, Phil and Stuart

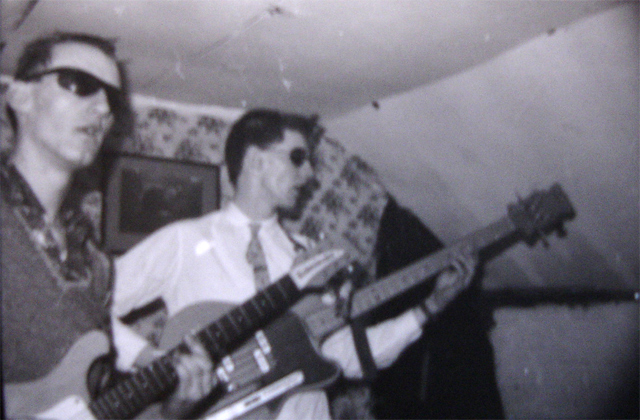
Stuart on Rickenbacker and Phil on Hayman Bass

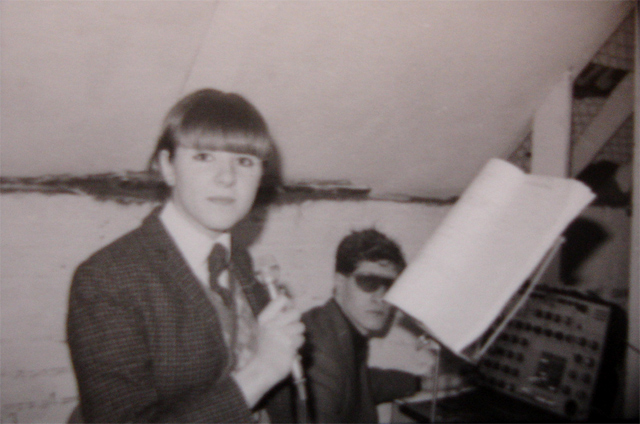
Alison and Peter with the synth

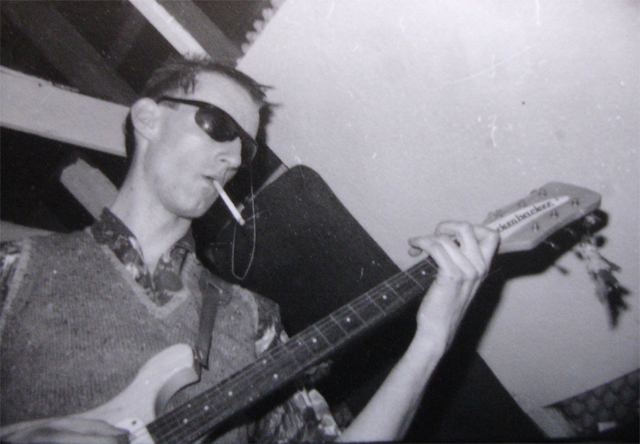
Stuart on Rickenbacker

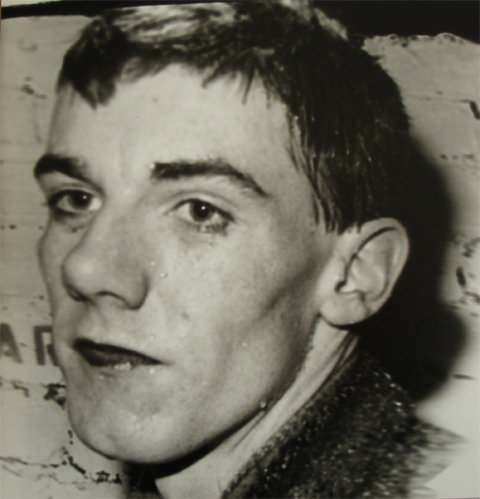
Philip Moxham, 1978/79

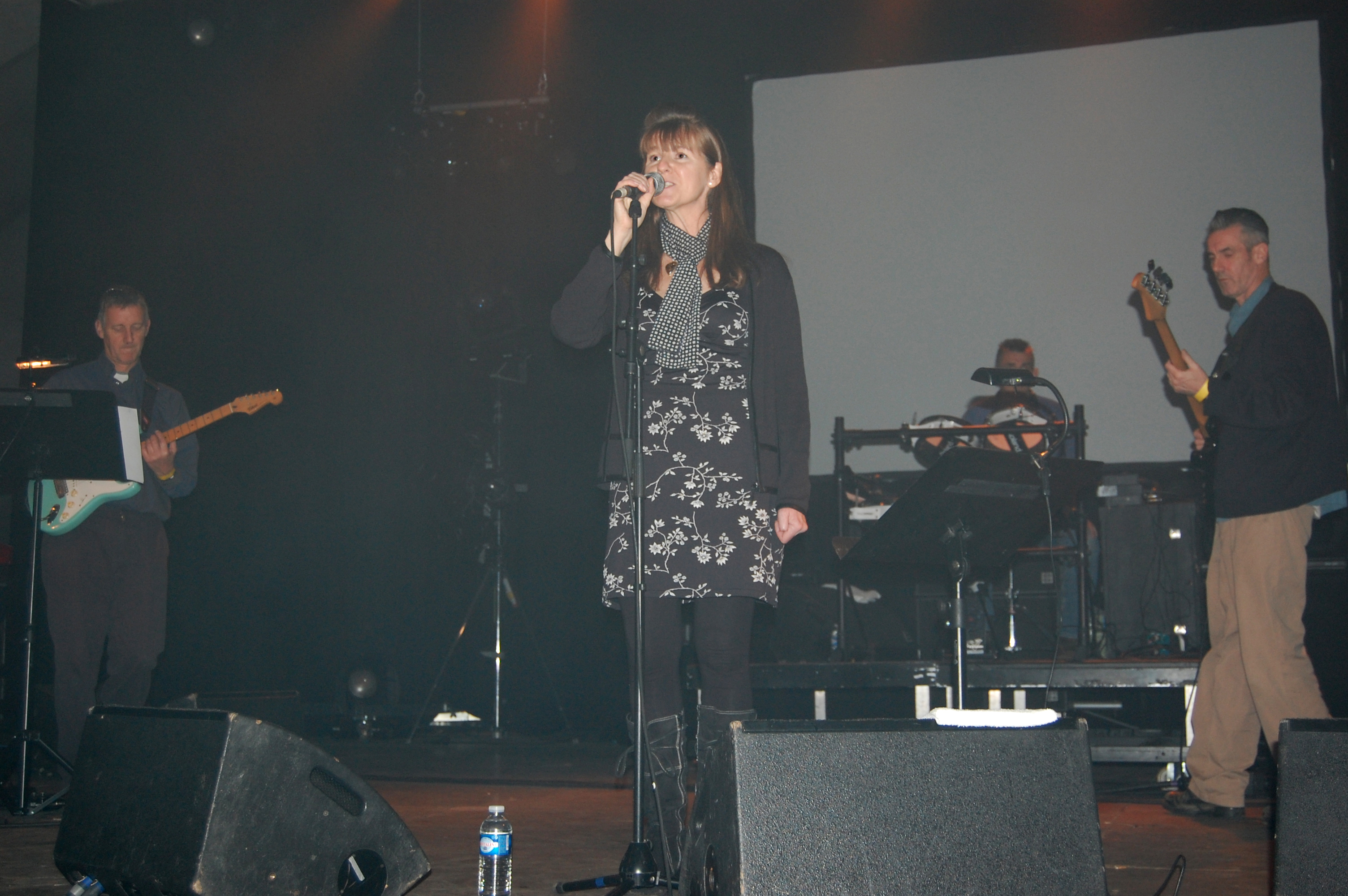
At the Factory Festival, Nivelles, Belgium, 2008
