= A Brand New Life =

A Brand New Life may refer to:

- A Brand New Life (1973 film), an American television film
- A Brand New Life (2009 film), a South Korean film
- Brand New Life, a 1989–1990 American television series
- "Brand New Life", the theme song of the American sitcom Who's the Boss?
- "Brand - New - Life", a song from the album Colossal Youth by Young Marble Giants
