= Fondo Semillas =

Fondo Semillas (Mujeres Sembrando Igualdad) is a Mexican feminist-driven non-profit organization. For 35 years, this organization has served as an intermediary resource to support community-based organizations, which would normally struggle in finding adequate funding, by working with international foundations and individual donors to bridge the gap between these grassroots organizations and the funding that they need.

== History and Origins ==
Fondo Semillas' roots date back to the late 1960s in Mexico City, where a surge of interest in gender equality emerged among students and activists, specifically young women. While its primary focus was political freedom rather than gender inequality, this student movement marks a revolutionary battle for change in governmental regime and funding.

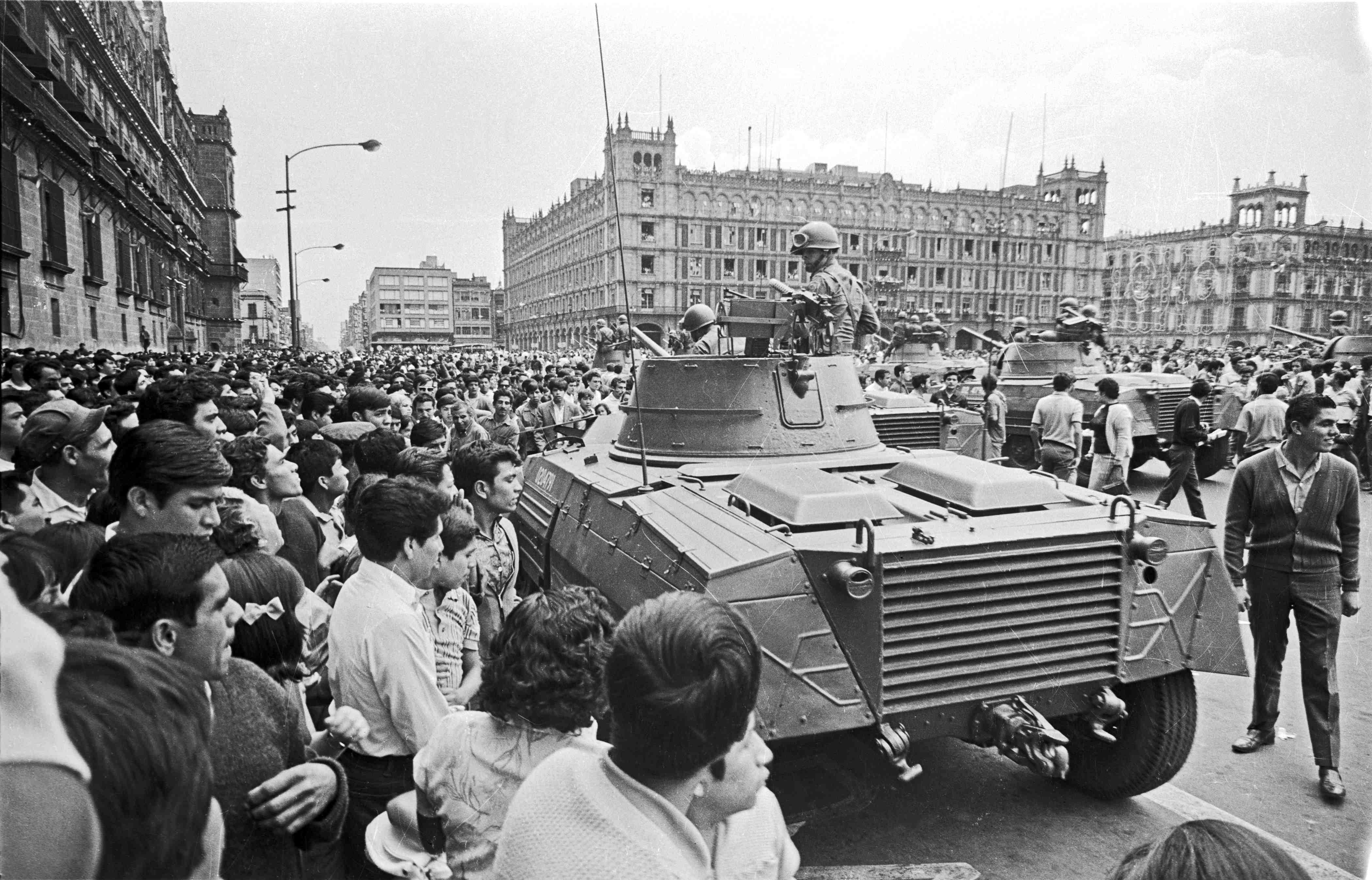
Student movement at the Zócalo Plaza in Mexico City in 1968

=== The Mexican Movement of 1968 (Movimiento de 1968 en México) ===
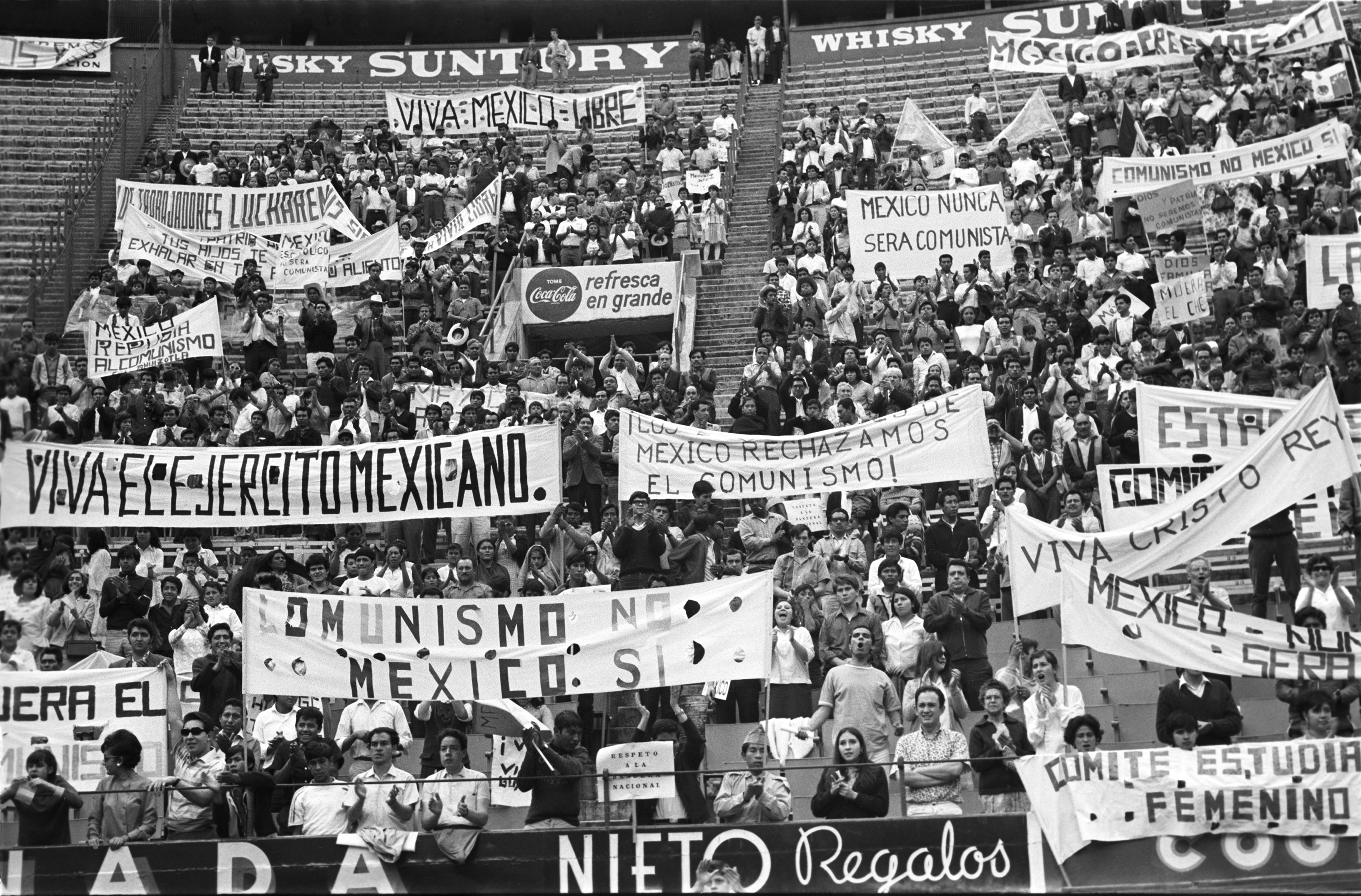
Student protest in Mexico City in 1968

The Mexican Movement of 1968 in Mexico City was a crucial breakthrough for democratic freedom through the mobilization of university students. Although a movement mainly run by male students, this movement and protest served as a significant milestone for questioning women's rights. The more women who participated to support their male classmates/comrades or "compañeros," lead to an increasing realization of the mistreatment and subordination female students and activists faced. This allowed many women to question gender inequality, ultimately changing the trajectory of women in academia during this time.

=== Founder ===
Lucero González is the founder of Fondo Semillas formerly called "The Mexican Society for the Rights of Women AC," formed in 1990. González's activism was deeply rooted in the Women's Liberation Movement (Movimiento de Liberacíon de la Mujer) and the Mexican Movement of 1968. González was able to establish this organization after receiving a grant from the Global Fund for Women towards the end of the 1980s, allowing Fondo Semillas to be a pivotal financial resource to sustain feminist activism within Mexico. As of 1992, González became a founding member of the Information Group on Reproduction Choice or Grupo de Informacíon Reproduccíon Elegida (GIRE).

== Priority Programs ==
Fondo Semillas has centralized their work around these four fundamental principles: Body, Land, Work, and Identities. These focalized programs provide an ongoing path of support with the use of a structural change model, seeking to find resolutions better equipped to challenge short-term solutions, which are often inefficient as they do not answer to critical issues, such as violence, abortion, sexual abuse, and migration faced by Mexican women and girls.

=== Body ===
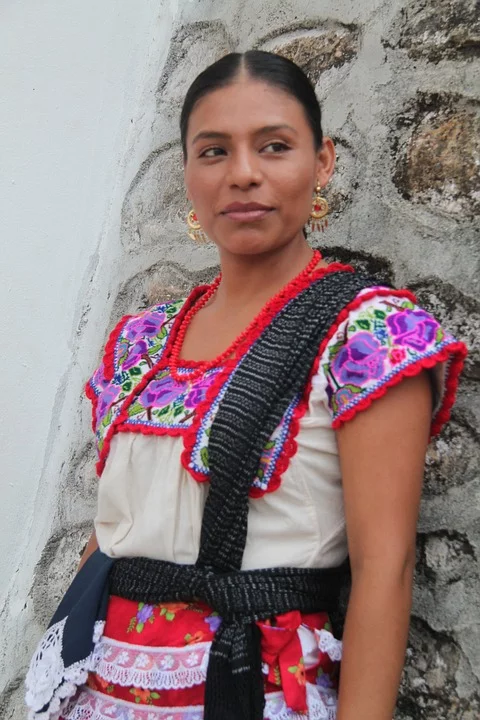
Indigenous woman from Oaxaca, Mexico

The body program focuses on the right to self-determination over one's physical well-being, framing reproductive rights as a fundamental human right. The program address Mexico's abortion compromise by supporting and promoting access to safe, legal termination while providing resources to confront institutionalized obstetric violence. Additionally, the program works to combat cultural gender-based violence such as femicides, sexual harassment, and rape.

=== Land ===
The land program utilizes a ecofeminist lens to focus on the relationship between women and nature, while supporting women as defenders of Indigenous natural resources and land within Mexico. This initiative opens the door for innovative strategies to build sustainable community development and challenge systems that exploits territory, while addressing the realities of the lack of legislation to protect women's property rights.

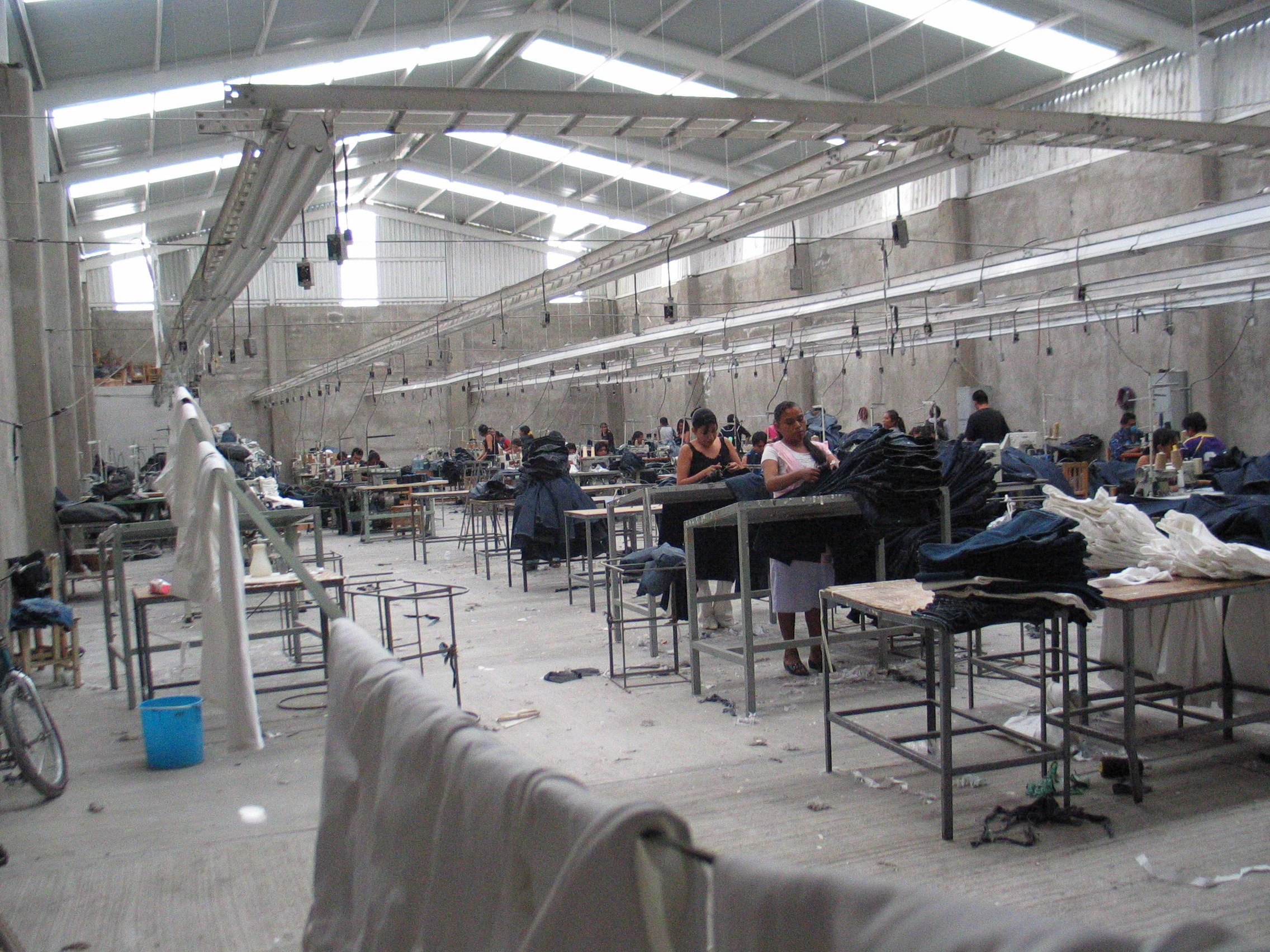
Maquiladora in Mexico

=== Work ===
The work program focuses on labour rights and economic autonomy within sectors such as domestic, factory (maquila), and agricultural work. The program promotes self-sufficiency through education on labour rights and advocacy for safe working conditions. Its goal is to see a future in which women hold leadership and political power, while encouraging and normalizing men's participation in unpaid domestic work.

=== Identities ===
Intersex pride flag

The identity program focuses on recognition and defending the rights of diverse groups including Indigenous communities and the LGBTQAI+ community. It acts as a device to sustain marginalized movements through partnerships like Brújula Intersexual, which provides safe spaces for intersexual individuals. Fondo Semillas' projects for 2026-2027 prioritize migration and anti-fundamentalism to support and protect those facing forced displacement or religious authoritarianism due to their identity or sexuality.

== Funding ==
Fondo Semillas operates as intermediary resource fund through donations. From 2016 through 2018, the organization experienced a financial growth in its annual budget from $32,486,455 MXN (~ $1,332,000 USD) to over $41,915,292 MXN (~ $2,226,500 USD). A key element of Fondo Semillas' financial strategy is the use of flexible support grants or participatory grant selection process, which allows recipient organizations to allocate these funds towards essential expenses, such as salaries instead of project-based initiatives.

For the 2026-2027 funding cycle, Fondo Semillas provides grants that range from $600,000 MXN to $1,200,000 MXN over a period of 18 months. However, the organization has a set list of who they do not finance, such as individual activists and/or trans/intersex individuals, government-affiliated institutions and/or groups, churches, and universities.

=== Decolonial Philanthropy ===
In 2020, Fondo Semillas incorporated decolonial practices into its philanthropy. Shifting towards a model that prioritizes sustainability and the dignity of activists and feminism within Mexico, instead of a "traditional" Eurocentric logic that solely focuses on cost efficiency. This specific model ensures that there is a conceptual approach to the grant amounts given, acknowledging the various costs of living in different states and regions in Mexico.

=== Cross-Generational Leadership ===
Fondo Semillas has made it a priority to bridge the gap between established activists and the rise of the Fourth Wave of Mexican feminism, recognizing leadership renewal as essential for long-term sustainability. The younger generation of the Fourth Wave is highly characterized and influenced by the spread of the digital era and employment of hashtag activism, such as the #MeToo movement. In order to address generational friction — often seen between older activists and the new generation of activists — as traditional leadership is viewed as accumulated experience, Fondo Semillas has integrated a cross-generational leadership-based training and dialogue. This program essentially prepares its partners for leadership succession by elevating the younger generation into key decision-making roles to maintain long-term sustainability in their collectives.

== Impact and Emergency Response ==
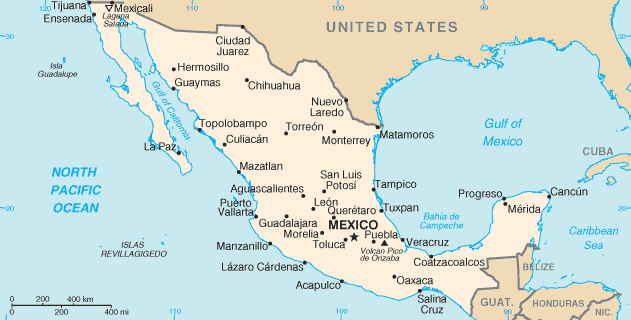
Map of Mexico

In 2017, Mexico was hit with two major earthquakes with magnitudes of 8.2 and 7.1, causing a widespread trail of destruction across the central and southern states. In response, Fondo Semillas launched their Women Rebuilding Their Communities (WRC) initiative which provided a multitude of projects, that were women-led, sustainable, and community resilient. These projects included water filter installations, smokeless stoves, psychological support and reinvigorating local markets by supporting women producers of bread and tortillas.

The organization issued 24 grants to address recovery needs such as structural, social, physical and psychological needs, of individuals in regions most affected. Four different states along with Mexico City received these grants.

=== List of grant receivers ===
1. Mexico City (2 grants).
2. Oaxaca (13 grants).
3. Puebla (4 grants).
4. Morelos (4 grants).
5. Guerrero (1 grant).

== List of Partners ==
=== Institutional Strengthening Alliances ===
1. AWID (Association for Women's rights and Development).
2. Prospera (International Network of Women's Funds).

=== Fund-Raising Opportunity Alliances ===
1. Global Fund for Women.
2. Astraea Lesbian Foundation for Justice.
3. Women's Foundation of Minnesota.

=== Strategic Alliances ===
1. Women's Funding Network.
2. Latin American Women's Funds Alliance.
3. Women's Earth Alliance (WEA).
4. 17, Institution de Estudios Críticos.

=== Tactical Alliances ===
1. United Nations Development Programme (UNDP).
2. Oxfam Mexico.
3. Ambulante.
4. Càntaro Azul Foundation.

=== Lobbying Alliances ===
1. UnidOSC.
2. Frente contra la Impunidad.
3. StopIGM.org.

=== Grantee-Partner Alliances ===
1. Brújula Intersexual.
2. Las Borders.
3. The Guardians of Estero El Conchalito.
4. Las Reinas Chulas.
5. Nduva Ndandi A.C.
