= Working Week (band) =

British band

- Origin: London, England
- Genres: Smooth jazz
- Years active: 1983–1991
- Labels: Paladin, Virgin, 10 Records
- Past members: Larry Stabbins; Simon Booth; Juliet Roberts

Working Week were a British jazz-dance band active in the 1980s and 1990s.

Working Week was formed in 1983 by guitarist Simon Booth and saxophonist Larry Stabbins from the band Weekend, which ended when singer Alison Statton left to become a chiropractor. Initially a floating ensemble of nine players including trombonist Annie Whitehead, vocalist Julie Tippett, pianist Keith Tippett and percussionist Bosco D'Oliveira, Working Week released their debut single "Venceremos (We Will Win)" during the following year. The song was a tribute to Chilean protest singer Víctor Jara, with vocals by Robert Wyatt and Tracey Thorn (the latter from the band Everything but the Girl). It became the band's highest placing in the UK Singles Chart, where it peaked at No. 64.

Booth and Stabbins then recruited Juliet Roberts as permanent vocalist and started working on an album. The debut album Working Nights was released on Virgin Records in April 1985. Produced by Robin Millar and mixing many styles such as soul, jazz and latin music, the album was a success with 150 000 UK and overseas sales.

Working Week, 1985

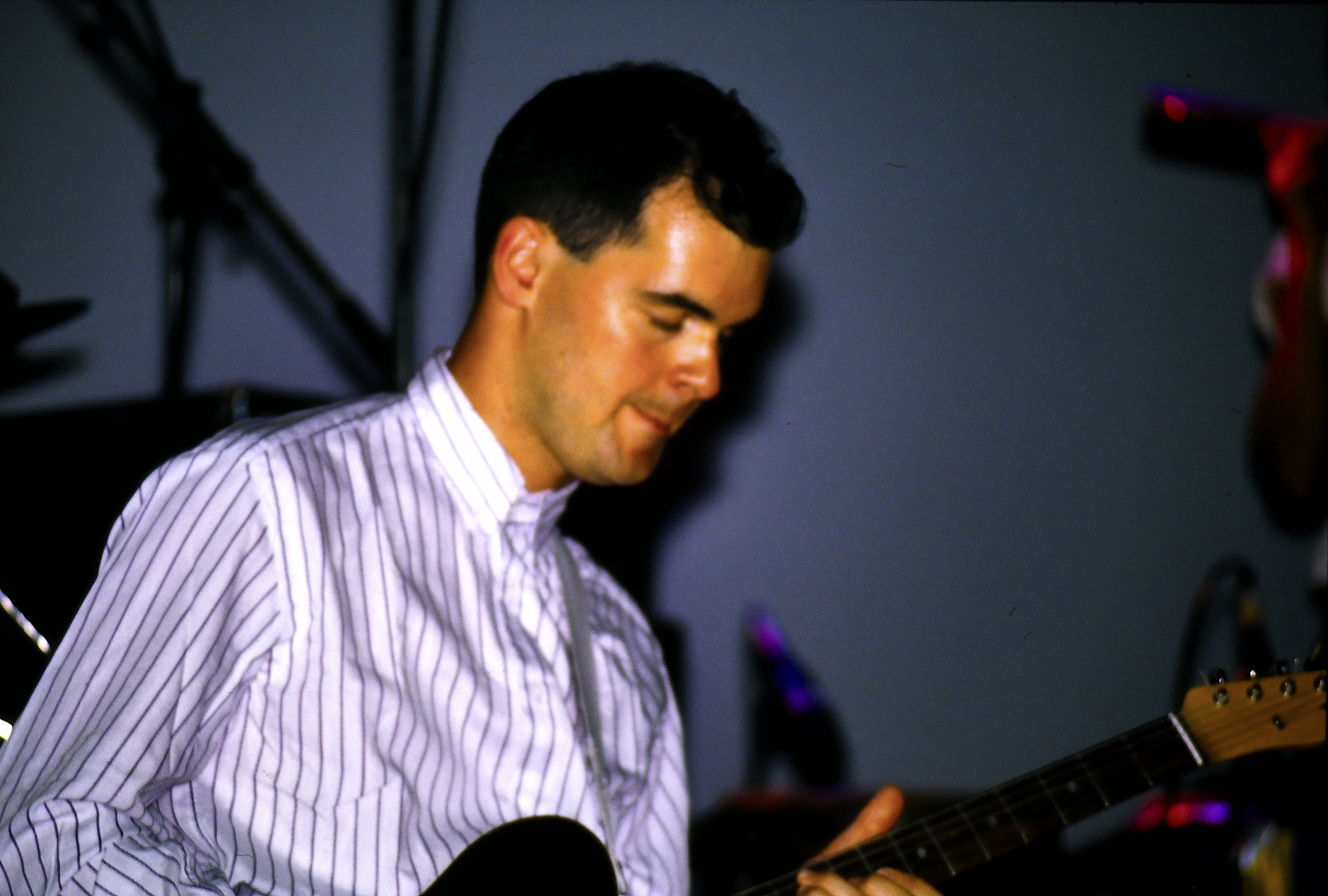
Simon Booth

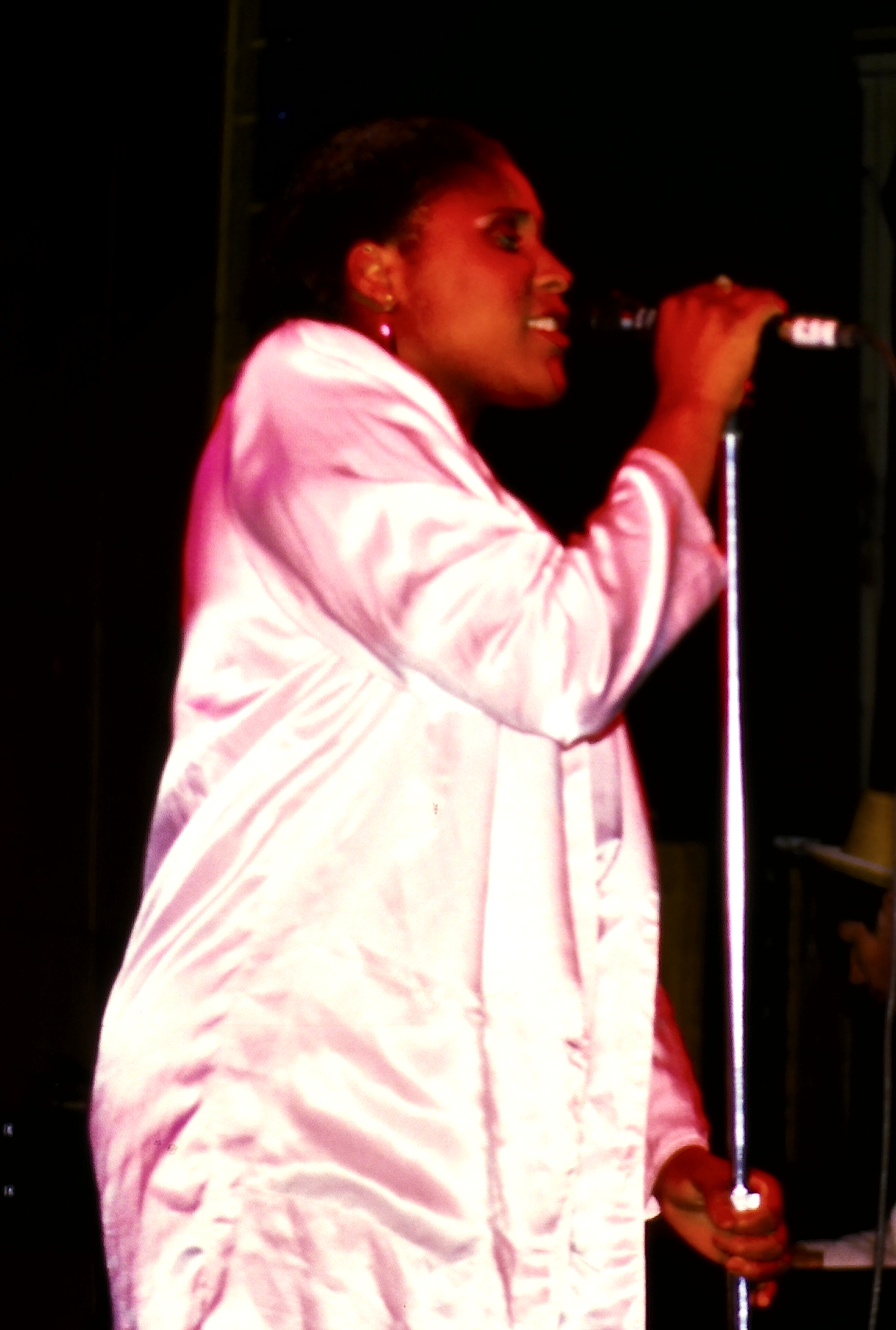
Juliet Roberts

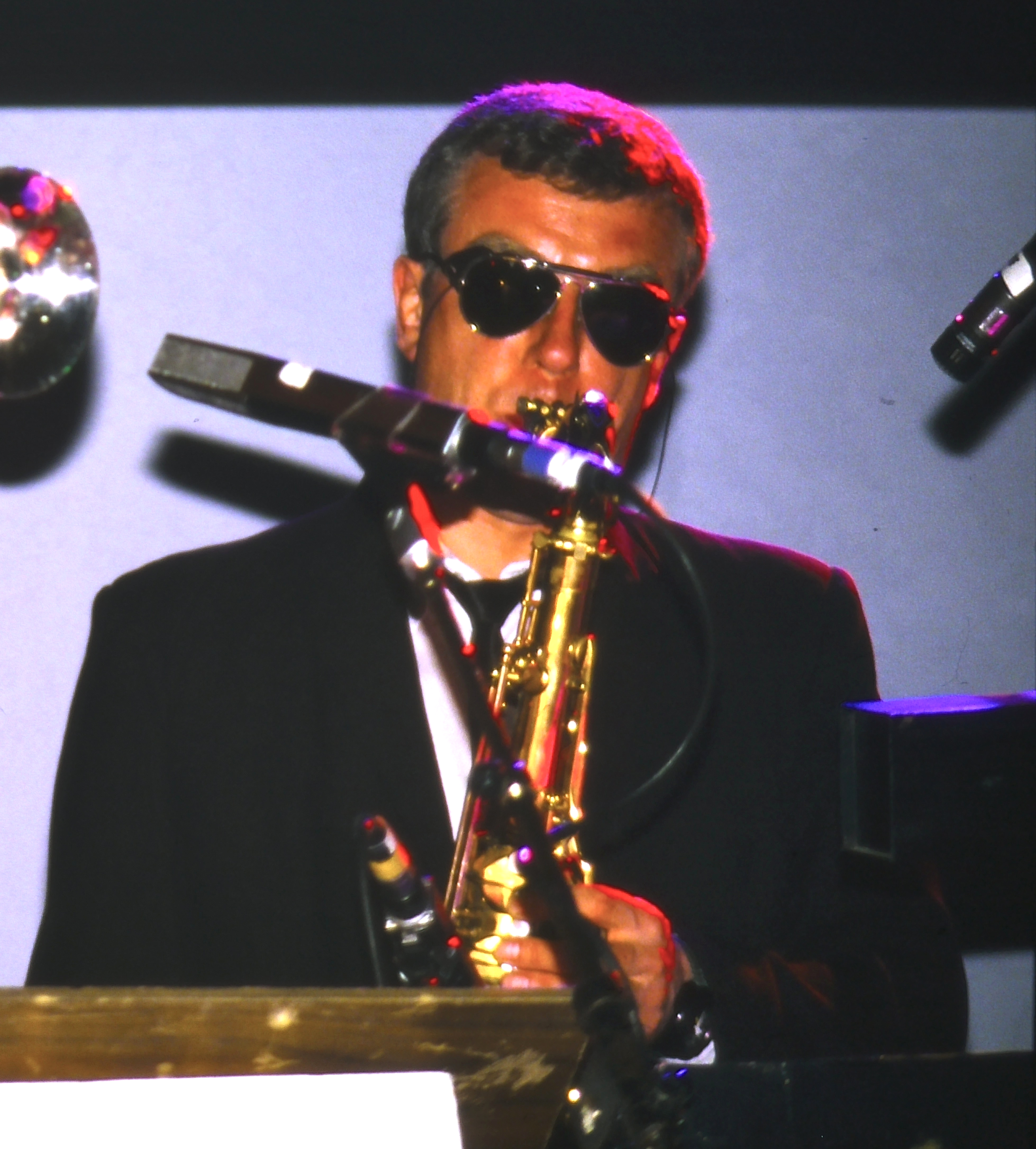
Larry Stabbins

Roberts continued as singer on the 1986 album Compañeros and Surrender, released in 1987, but left the band after that year's single, "Knocking on Your Door". Julie Tippett returned as vocalist for the 1989 album Fire in the Mountain, and Eyvon Waite was solo vocalist for Black and Gold (1991), the band's final studio album.

Working Week appeared on 9 February 1986 at the Royal Albert Hall in a benefit concert for victims of the 1985 Armero tragedy in Colombia. The same year they contributed to the Absolute Beginners film soundtrack.

== Discography ==
=== Albums ===
- Working Nights (Virgin Records V2343) – 1985 UK No. 23
- Compañeros (Virgin Records V2397) – 1986 UK No. 72
- Surrender (Virgin Records V2468) – 1987
- Payday (Best of Working Week) (compilation), (Virgin Records Ltd./Venture VEGD19) – 1988, also in 1999
- Pay Check (compilation, US version of 'Payday') (Venture 2–90997) – 1988
- Fire in the Mountain (10 Records DIX86) – 1989
- Black and Gold (10 Records DIX95) – 1991

=== Singles ===
- "Venceremos (We Will Win)" – 1984 UK No. 64
- "Storm of Light" – 1984 UK No. 88
- "Inner City Blues" – 1985 UK No. 93
- "Sweet Nothing" – 1985 UK No. 83
- "Stella Marina" – 1985
- "I Thought I'd Never See You Again" – 1985 UK No. 80
- "Too Much Time" – 1986 UK No. 94
- "South Africa" – 1986
- "Rodrigo Bay" – 1986
- "Don't Touch My Friend" – 1986
- "Surrender" – 1987
- "Largo" – 1987
- "Knocking On Your Door" – 1988
- "Eldorado" – 1989
- "Blade" – 1989
- "Testify" – 1990
- "Positive" – 1991 UK No. 96
- "Holding On" – 1991
