= Working Nights (album) =

1985 jazz album by Working Week

Studio album by Working Week
- Released: May 1985
- Recorded: August 1983 to 1985
- Studio: Powerplant Studios (London)
- Genre: Soul jazz, latin jazz contemporary jazz
- Length: 43:55
- Label: Virgin; Cherry Red
- Producer: Robin Millar

Working Week chronology
Working Nights (1985)	Compañeros (1986)

Working Nights is the debut album by the British jazz dance band Working Week, released in 1985 by Virgin Records. The album reached #23 on the UK album charts in April 1985. Working Nights was reissued in 2012 as a remastered 2-disc Deluxe Set by Cherry Red Records.

== Track listing ==
All tracks composed by Simon Booth and Larry Stabbins, except where noted.

1. "Inner City Blues" (Marvin Gaye, James Nyx Jr.) – 5:44
2. "Sweet Nothing" (Booth) – 3:39
3. "Who’s Fooling Who" – 5:04
4. "Thought I’d Never See You Again" – 6:26
5. "Autumn Boy" – 6:33
6. "Solo" – 4:40
7. "Venceremos" (Booth) – 4:41
8. "No Cure No Pay" (Stabbins) – 8:28

=== 2012 Cherry Red Records reissue ===
Disc 1

1. "Inner City Blues" (Gaye, Nyx Jr.) – 5:44
2. "Sweet Nothing" (Booth) – 3:39
3. "Who’s Fooling Who" – 5:04
4. "Thought I’d Never See You Again" – 6:26
5. "Autumn Boy" – 6:33
6. "Solo" – 4:40
7. "Venceremos" (Booth) – 4:41
8. "No Cure No Pay" (Stabbins) – 8:28
9. "Stella Marina" (Main Mix) (Stabbins, Jalal) – 11:04
10. "Storm of Light" – 6:40
11. "Bottom End" (Booth) – 5:45
12. "Venceremos (We Will Win)" (Jazz Dance Special 12" Edit) (Booth) – 4:08

Disc 2

1. "Venceremos (We Will Win)" (Jazz Dance Special 12" Version) (Booth) – 10:17
2. "Afochê" (Stabbins) – 10:17
3. "Murphy’s Law" (live previously unissued) (Stabbins) – 7:37
4. "Pepe’s Samba" (live previously unissued) (Chico Freeman) – 8:39
5. "Inner City Blues" (Urbane Guerrilla Mix) (Gaye, Nyx Jr.) – 5:45
6. "Storm of Light" (Instrumental) – 3:24
7. "Who’s Fooling Who" (Dance Version) – 4:45
8. "Sweet Nothing" (Instrumental) (Booth) – 3:41
9. "Where’s the Bridge" (Longer Mix) (Booth, Stabbins, Juliet Roberts) – 5:09
10. "Venceremos" (We Will Win) (7" Bossa Version) (Booth) – 4:42
11. "Stella Marina" (Full Rap)" (Stabbins, Jalal) – 8:35

== Personnel ==
Working Week

- Juliet Roberts – vocals
- Simon Booth – guitars
- Larry Stabbins – tenor and soprano saxophone and flute

with:

- Kim Burton – piano
- Mike Carr – organ (disc 1, track 10; disc 2, track 6)
- Roy Dodds – drums (disc 1, tracks 2, 5, 6, 8, 9; disc 2, track 11)
- Nic France – drums (disc 1, tracks 1, 3, 4)
- Mark Taylor – drums (disc 1, tracks 1, 12; disc 2, tracks 1, 10)
- Louis Moholo – drums (disc 1, track 9; disc 2, track 11)
- Ernest Mothle – bass (disc 1, tracks 2, 5, 6, 8, 9; disc 2, track 11)
- Chucho Merchán – bass (disc 1, tracks 1, 3, 4, 7, 12; disc 2, tracks 1, 10)
- Dawson Miller and Bosco De Oliveira – percussion (disc 1, tracks 2, 5–9, 12; disc 2, tracks 10, 11)
- Martin Ditcham – percussion (disc 1, tracks 1, 3, 4)
- Robin Millar – additional guitar (disc 1, tracks 1, 3, 5)
- Leroy Osbourne – backing vocals (disc 1, track 2)
- Tracey Thorn – guest vocals (disc 1, track 12; disc 2, tracks 1, 10)
- Robert Wyatt – guest vocals (disc 1, track 12; disc 2, tracks 1, 10)
- Julie Tippetts – guest vocals (disc 1, track 9, 10; disc 2, track 11)
- Jalal – guest vocals (disc 1, track 9; disc 2, track 11)
- Claudia Figueroa – guest vocals (disc 1, track 7, 12; disc 2, tracks 1, 10)
- Guy Barker – trumpet and flugelhorn (disc 1, tracks 1, 3, 4)
- Stuart Brooke – trumpet (disc 1, track 1)
- Harry Beckett – trumpet (disc 1, tracks 2, 5, 11; disc 2, tracks 6, 8)
- Paul Spong – trumpet (disc 1, track 6)
- Annie Whitehead – trombone (disc 1, tracks 2, 6, 8, 9)
- Malcolm Griffiths – trombone (disc 1, track 4)
- Paul Nieman – trombone (disc 1, track 1)
- Chris Biscoe – alto saxophone (disc 1, track 3)
- Ray Warleigh – alto and baritone saxophone (disc 1, tracks 1, 3)
- Dave Bitelli – clarinet and baritone saxophone (disc 1, track 12; disc 2, tracks 1, 10)
- Nick Ingman – string arrangements

== Charts ==
=== Album charts ===
Year	Chart	Position
1985	UK album charts	#23
