= Big Heavy Stuff =

Australian rock band

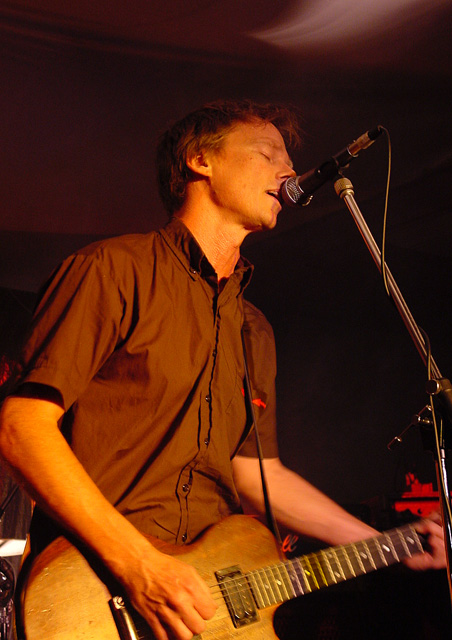
- Big Heavy Stuff's Greg Atkinson performing

Background information
- Origin: Sydney, New South Wales, Australia
- Genre: Indie guitar rock
- Years active: 1990–2006, 2009–2010
- Labels: Volition/Sony; Hypnotized/Shock; Redline; DeSoto
- Past members: Darren Atkinson; Greg Atkinson; Darren Jones; Carolyn Polley; Eliot Fish; Nick Kennedy; Adam Young

Big Heavy Stuff were an Australian indie rock band, established in 1990. They released four studio albums and three studio EPs before separating in 2006. Their final album, Dear Friends and Enemies (2004), reached the ARIA Albums chart's Top 100. They briefly reunited for select shows between 2009 and 2010. Big Heavy Stuff had toured regularly alongside fellow Australian bands Powderfinger, You Am I, and Something for Kate.

== History ==
=== Formation, Pops Like Crazy, and Truck (1990–1993) ===
In 1990, Big Heavy Stuff were formed in Sydney by brothers Darren Atkinson (drums, backing vocals) and Greg Atkinson (lead vocals, rhythm guitars), along with Darren Jones (bass) and Carolyn Polley (lead guitars, backing vocals). All four members were involved in various bands throughout the 1980s. The Atkinson brothers were members of a "neo-psychedelic outfit" Ups and Downs, which formed in 1983 in Brisbane. Ups and Downs were more pop in nature, so the brothers formed Big Heavy Stuff, "a decidedly noisier" group. Jones played bass guitar in the Pranksters and Glovebox. Polley was briefly the guitarist in Toys Went Berserk, and also played in Dutiful Daughters (both Jones and D. Atkinson had been members of Dutiful Daughters).

Big Heavy Stuff were signed to Volition Records, since Ups and Downs had released their final extended play (EP) on that label. Big Heavy Stuff's debut EP, Pops Like Crazy, was released in December 1991. It contained a cover version of the Carpenters' rendition of Delany and Bonnie's song "Superstar", which became the Sydney band's first music video. Big Heavy Stuff issued their debut full-length album Truck in November 1993. Carole Leedham of The Canberra Times rated it at 8/10 and explained, "Ranging from the aggressiveness of 'Happy' and the catchyness of 'Skin a Cat' to the serenity and beauty of 'Dare', Truck is a debut album of which [they] can be proud." After the album appeared, D. Atkinson left the band and was replaced on drums by Nick Kennedy of Templebears.

=== Trouble & Desire, Covered in Bruises, label shifts, and Maximum Sincere (1994–1999) ===
The band released their second EP Trouble & Desire in November 1994. Jones was then replaced on bass by Eliot Fish (another former member of Templebears). The stabilized lineup released a third EP Covered in Bruises in August 1995, and it was the band's final release on Volition. In the United States, "Birthday" was released as a single to promote the EP via DeSoto Records (which was owned by two members of the post-hardcore band Jawbox).

Big Heavy Stuff then signed with Hypnotized, a sub-label of Shock Records. They issued two singles, "Big Mouth" (October 1996) and "May" (March 1997). Both were from their second album, Maximum Sincere, released in May 1997 via Hypnotized. A few months later, in the midst of a national tour, Polley departed from the band. At her urging, she was replaced on guitar by former Daisygrinders member, Adam Young. Two more singles from the album were released in November. The lineup of G. Atkinson, Fish, Kennedy, and Young recorded a live five-track EP late in 1997, Live at the Thebarton Theatre, on Hypnotized. Big Heavy Stuff were then chosen as the main backing band on Radiohead's Australia leg of their Against Demons Tour (in February and March 1998). By 1999 however, Polley had replaced Young in turn, and the quartet left Hypnotized.

=== Size of the Ocean, mainstream success, Dear Friends and Enemies, and disbandment (2000–2006) ===
The band gained the attention of popular Australian alternative rock band Jebediah, who added Big Heavy Stuff to the roster of Redline Records in 2000, an independent label that Jebediah co-founded with its then-management company Naked Ape Management. The arrangement with Redline facilitated the release of their third studio album, Size of the Ocean (March 2001). Although it did not appear on the ARIA Albums chart, it peaked at No. 17 on the ARIA Alternative Albums and No. 10 on the ARIA Hitseekers charts. It provided the single "Hibernate" which was listed at No. 77 on the Hottest 100 of 2001 ranking by Australian national radio station Triple J, a list that was voted on by the station's listeners. Also in 2001, Size of the Ocean was nominated in the ARIA Award for Best Adult Alternative Album category.

In 2004, the band released their fourth and final album Dear Friends and Enemies, also on Redline, which was produced by Wayne Connolly (Silverchair) and David Trump (Bluebottle Kiss). It peaked at No. 94 on the ARIA Albums chart (the band's first appearance on the global-encompassing chart) and also at No. 04 on the ARIA Hitseekers chart. In 2006, after performing at the Come Together Music Festival in Luna Park Sydney, the band went on an indefinite hiatus. It was later announced, via FBi Radio, that the band had dissolved.

=== Subsequent events (2007–present) ===
The group reunited for a show at the Factory Theatre in Marrickville, Sydney in April 2009. The gig was for the That Then This Now documentary. The band reformed again to support Powderfinger in September 2010 at the Sydney Entertainment Centre as part of Powderfinger's farewell tour.

Various archival releases started to occur by the 2020s. Size of the Ocean was reissued on vinyl and cassette in 2023, as was Dear Friends and Enemies in 2024. In addition, an acoustic-oriented live album titled Live at Triple J 2004 was released in 2024 as well. In 2025, the band released Bruises, which consisted of Covered in Bruises in its entirety, along with twelve additional songs that were recorded between 1995 and 1997. Bruises notably peaked at No. 18 on the ARIA Australian Albums chart. A 30th anniversary edition of Maximum Sincere was released in early 2026. A bonus album of demos, Monochrome Maxima, was bundled into the reissue; it featured songs that were recorded just before the band signed to Hypnotized/Shock. The reissue of Maximum Sincere appeared at No. 12 on the ARIA Australian Albums chart.

== Side projects ==
Fish has recorded as a solo artist and released a six-song EP, Trick of Light, on the Nonlinear label in mid-2012. Prior to joining Big Heavy Stuff, Fish and Kennedy were in the Templebears alongside Josh Morris. Fish, Kennedy, and Morris reunited as the Electorate, releasing an album in October 2020, You Don't Have Time to Stay Lost. Their second album was released in 2025, By Design.

In addition to producing and recording various acts (which included Big Heavy Stuff after his departure), D. Atkinson played in the band Atticus during the 1990s (which also included the aforementioned Morris). The Atkinson brothers formed Worker Bees, which released a self-titled debut album in 2011. The brothers also reformed their earlier band, Ups and Downs, which released a studio album, The Sky's in Love with You, in 2017. Their next album, Stained Glass Memories, was released in 2025.

== Members ==
- Greg Atkinson – lead vocals, rhythm guitars (1990–2006, 2009–2010)
- Carolyn Polley – lead guitars, backing vocals (1990–1997, 1999–2006, 2009–2010)
- Darren Atkinson – drums, backing vocals (1990–1993)
- Darren Jones – bass (1990–1994)
- Nick Kennedy – drums (1993–2006, 2009–2010)
- Eliot Fish – bass, backing vocals (1994–2006, 2009–2010)
- Adam Young – lead guitars (1997–1999)

=== Timeline ===
Color denotes main live duty.

== Discography ==
=== Studio albums ===
List of studio albums, with Australian chart positions
Title	Album details	Peak chart positions
Title	Album details	AUS
Truck	Released: November 1993; Label: Volition (VOLTCD78); Formats: CD	–
Maximum Sincere	Released: 1997; Label: The Hypnotized Label (HIP025); Formats: CD	–
Size of the Ocean	Released: 19 March 2001; Label: Redline Records (SHK RED003); Formats: CD	–
Dear Friends and Enemies	Released: February 2004; Label: Redline Records (RED023); Formats: CD	94

=== Extended plays ===
List of studio EPs/mini-albums, with selected details
Title	EP details
Pops Like Crazy	Released: 1991; Label: Volition (VOLTCD44); Formats: CD, Cassette
Trouble & Desire	Released: 1994; Label: Volition (VOLTCD98); Formats: CD
Covered in Bruises	Released: 1995; Label: Volition (VOLTCD108); Formats: CD

=== Live albums ===
List of live albums, with selected details
Title	Album details
Live at the Thebarton Theatre	Released: 1997; Label: The Hypnotized Label; Formats: CD
Live at Triple J 2004	Released: May 2024; Label: Love as Fiction; Formats: LP, CD, digital

=== Compilation albums ===
List of compilation albums, with selected details
Title	Album details
Bruises	Released: 20 June 2025; Label: Love As Fiction Records; Formats: LP, CD

=== Singles ===
List of singles
Title	Year	Album
"Superstar"	1991	Pops Like Crazy
"Chaos"	1992	Truck
"Skin a Cat"	1993	Truck
"Birthday"	1995	Covered in Bruises
"Bigmouth"	1996	Maximum Sincere
"May"	1997	Maximum Sincere
"Maximum Sincere"	1997	Maximum Sincere
"Cheating on a Dead Wife"	1997	Maximum Sincere
"Devil's Tongue"	2000	Size of the Dream
"Two Sisters"	2001	Size of the Dream
"Hibernate"	2001	Size of the Dream
"Laughing Boy"	2001	Size of the Dream
"Mutiny"	2003	Dear Friends and Enemies

== Awards and nominations ==
=== ARIA Music Awards ===
The ARIA Music Awards is an annual awards ceremony that recognises excellence, innovation, and achievement across all genres of Australian music. They commenced in 1987.

Year	Nominee / work	Award	Result	Ref.
2001	Size of the Ocean	Best Adult Alternative Album	Nominated	
