= Larry Stabbins =

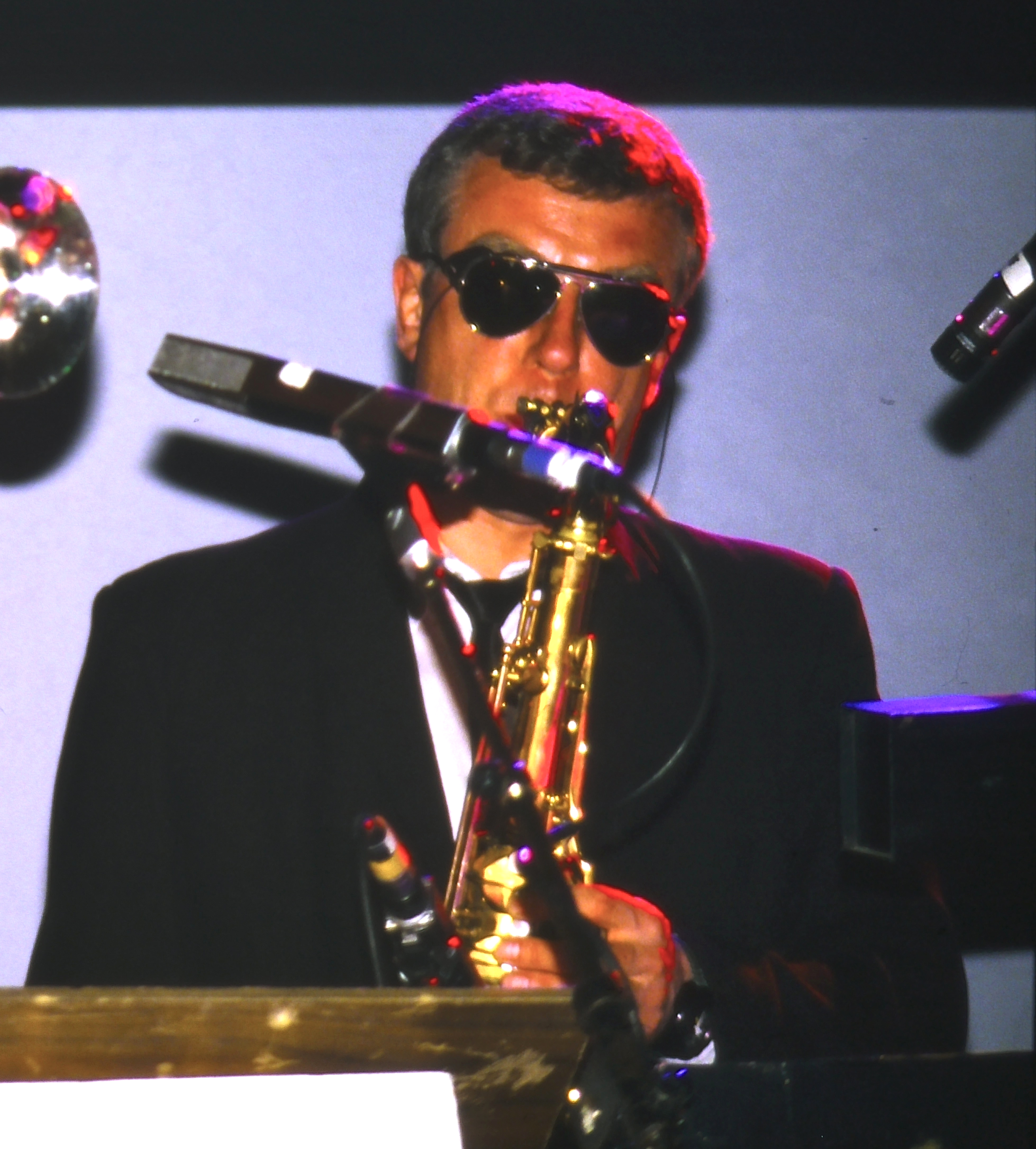
- Larry Stabbins, 1985

Background information
- Also known as: Stonephace
- Born: 9 September 1949 (age 76); Bristol, England
- Genres: Jazz
- Occupations: Musician; Composer
- Instruments: Tenor sax soprano sax flute
- Years active: 1978–present

Larry Stabbins (born 9 September 1949) is a British jazz saxophonist, flutist and composer.

== Biography ==
Larry Stabbins learned clarinet at school from the age of eight, when his musical idol was Acker Bilk. He started playing saxophone at the age of eleven. He was soon playing in local dance bands, doing his first paid gig aged twelve, and later also playing in soul bands such as Bristol group The Strange Fruits, particularly the music of Junior Walker and James Brown. He started working with pianist Keith Tippett when he was sixteen and later contributed to various Tippett projects such as Centipede, Ark, Tapestry and the Keith Tippett Septet. In addition the two also worked for a time in a trio with South African percussionist Louis Moholo.

In London in the early 1970s, after a brief period in the Chris McGregor’s Brotherhood of Breath, he played with John Stevens’ Spontaneous Music Orchestra, and occasionally with the Spontaneous Music Ensemble (SME). During this period he also worked as a freelance commercial musician, playing studio sessions, nightclubs and West End shows, as well as playing in more jazz-based situations such as Mike Westbrook’s 'Solid Gold Cadillac'. In the 1980’s he joined the Tony Oxley Quintet and played in various versions of the band and also with the Celebration Orchestra, for many years.

Around the same time he joined the London Jazz Composers Orchestra as well as Peter Brötzmann’s Alarm Orchestra and its successor the tentet 'Marz Combo'. He also worked with, among others, the Eddie Prevost Quartet, Trevor Watts’ Moire Music, Louis Moholo’s Spirits Rejoice, Elton Dean’s Ninesense and the Heinz Becker Quintet.

He also played in the cult pop group Weekend and started writing with its guitarist Simon Booth. This later evolved into Working Week, a band that took a mix of Latin, soul, jazz and funk into the pop charts. From the Latin Jazz Dance scene in London clubs, the band mixed jazz with Latin dance rhythms and vocals by singers such as Juliet Roberts, Julie Tippetts, Robert Wyatt and Tracy Thorn. The band toured extensively in Europe and Japan, performing at most of Europe's major Jazz Festivals and recording five albums for Virgin Records. Following the breakup of Working Week he formed 'QRZ?' a fusion of jazz and rap which also recorded for Virgin Records and for the German label Loud Minority.

In recent years Stabbins has worked with Keith Tippett’s Tapestry Orchestra, in Louis Moholo’s Dedication Orchestra, in a quartet with Howard Riley, playing the music of Robert Wyatt in Soupsongs, and in Jerry Dammers Spatial AKA Orchestra.

The album Stonephace (2009) on Tru Thoughts Recordings, a collaboration with rave producer and DJ Krzysztof Oktalski, featured Portishead guitarist Adrian Utley and Helm DeVegas on keyboards, plus a guest appearance by trumpeter Guy Barker.

His latest project 'Stonephace Stabbins' features Mercury nominated pianist Zoe Rahman, Crispin "Spry" Robinson from 1990's Jazz/Rap band Galliano on percussion, Karl Rasheed Abel on bass and Pat Illingworth on drums, all of whom also play in Jerry Dammers’ Spatial AKA Orchestra.

== Discography ==
- 1971 - Septober Energy - Keith Tippett's Centipede (RCA)
- 1973 - Mouthpiece - Spontaneous Music Orchestra, (Emanem 4039)
- 1976 - Fire Without Bricks - Ashbury/Stabbins Duo, (Bead 4)
- 1978 - Frames - Keith Tippett's Ark, (Ogun)
- 1979 - Mama Lapato- Mama Lapato, (Bead 20)
- 1980 - Stringer - London Jazz Composers Orchestra, (FMP SAJ-41)
- 1982 - Tern - Moholo, Stabbins, Tippett. *FMP SAJ-43/44, Unheard Music Series)
- 1983 - Continuum - Eddie Prevost Quartet, (Matchless MR7, re-released with extra tracks as MRCD07 1999)
- 1985 - A Loose Kite... - Keith Tippett Septet, (Ogun 007/008)
- 1985 - Tomorrow Is Here - Tony Oxley Celebration Orchestra, (Dossier ST 7507)
- 1985 - Working Nights - Working Week (Virgin Records)
- 1986 - Compañeros - Working Week, (Virgin Records)
- 1987 - Surrender - Working Week, (Virgin Records)
- 1989 - Fire In The Mountain - Working Week, (Virgin Records)
- 1989 - Black and Gold - Working Week, (Virgin Records)
- 1992 - The Marz Combo - Peter Brötzmann Tentet,(FMP CD47)
- 1998 - Live at Le Mans - Keith Tippett Tapestry Orchestra, (Red Eye Music redeye008)
- 1999 - Prayer - Larry Stabbins & Oktal (one track on Talking Drums), (Unknown Public 12)
- 2001 - Four In The Afternoon - Wren/Stabbins/Riley/Sanders, (Emanem 4067)
- 2003 - Monadic (Emanem CD 4093)
- 2009 - Stonephace (Tru Thoughts) - Stonephace
- 2022 - Unreleased 1974–2016 - Tony Oxley, (Discus) recorded in 1974, 1981, and 2016
- 2025 - Live in Foggia - with Keith Tippett and Louis Moholo, (Ogun, released 2025, recorded in 1985)
