= Spike (Welsh guitarist) =

Welsh guitarist

Mark Williams more commonly known as Spike or Spike Williams is a Welsh guitarist and co-founder of South Wales' record label, Z Block Records. He was a member of the Cardiff-based band Reptile Ranch.

== Career history ==
Named was Spike's record label set up and named after the Z-Block college building they used in Ebbw Vale, South Wales in 1978.

In May 1979, Z Block moved to Splott, Cardiff, where they set about organising the city's first DIY compilation LP. Titled Is The War Over?, this seminal compilation was released in October 1979 and its release brought The Young Marble Giants to Rough Trade's attention. It also showcased many of Cardiff's best post punk bands of the period. Reptile Ranch disbanded in 1980.

After the split of Young Marble Giants in 1980, Spike started writing with their vocalist, Alison Statton. Later that year, Alison merged this work with a London-based project which brought in Simon Emmerson to create a new band named Weekend. At the same time Spike was working in Cardiff with Lewis Mottram and Debbie Debris as Table Table. When Weekend split in 1983, Spike returned to Splott and formed Bomb and Dagger with singer Debbie Debris and a handful of Cardiff musicians - the original line-up included both Alison Statton and Phil Moxham, and Andrew Moxham.

Bomb and Dagger performed regularly throughout South Wales including the Brecon Jazz Festival before splitting up in 1989 following a gruelling European tour.

Spike moved to London in 1990 and worked with folk musician Charlotte Greig. After an eight-year break, Spike and Alison Statton returned to the studio thanks to the support of Rough Trade founder, Geoff Travis. Between 1991 and 1997 Statton and Spike produced Weekend in Wales (EP) and two home made studio albums, Tidal Blues and The Shady Tree for Vinyl Japan.

In 2006, the Alison Statton & Spike material was re-released by LTM while the Weekend material was re-released by the Cherry Red record label. In 2018, Alison Statton & Spike released a new album, Bimini Twist, while Spike also issued a compilation of his work with Debbie Debris, Always Sunshine, Always Rain.
