= Colossal Youth =

Studio album by Young Marble Giants
- Released: February 1980
- Recorded: 1979
- Studio: Foel (Mid Wales)
- Genre: Post-punk
- Length: 38:20
- Label: Rough Trade
- Producers: Dave Anderson; Young Marble Giants

Professional ratings
Review scores
Source	Rating
AllMusic	4.5/5 stars
Blender	4.5/5 stars
Christgau's Record Guide	B
The Guardian	5/5 stars
The Irish Times	4/5 stars
Pitchfork	9.3/10
Rolling Stone	4/5 stars
Spin	4/5 stars
Spin Alternative Record Guide	10/10
Uncut	5/5 stars

Colossal Youth is the only studio album by Welsh post-punk band Young Marble Giants, released in February 1980 on Rough Trade Records. Young Marble Giants were offered the opportunity to record the album after Rough Trade heard just two songs by the band on the local Cardiff music compilation Is the War Over?

Young Marble Giants developed from an earlier band, True Wheel, (named after a song by Brian Eno from his 1974 LP Taking Tiger Mountain (By Strategy). Alison Statton (vocals), Philip Moxham (bass) and his brother Stuart (guitar and main songwriter), formed Young Marble Giants in 1979. Signed by the Rough Trade label, the band recorded Colossal Youth in a studio in North Wales.

== Recording ==
Colossal Youth was recorded in five days at Foel Studios, located near Welshpool in Mid Wales. The album was engineered by the studio's owner, former Amon Düül II and Hawkwind member Dave Anderson. Young Marble Giants had no prior knowledge of formal music production, and as a result the production on Colossal Youth was kept deliberately simple, with the final record featuring many of the band's first takes, as well as minimal overdubbing. The drums heard on the album were recorded straight from a cassette player playing a tape of pre-recorded beats that the band used in lieu of their original drum machine. The only two overdubs on the record are a slide guitar on "Include Me Out" and distorted vocals on "Eating Noddemix". Each track was mixed in around 20 minutes.

== Legacy ==
According to critic Richie Unterberger, Colossal Youth is "one of the most highly regarded indie cult post-punk recordings, with a unique hushed and minimal atmosphere." Nirvana singer-songwriter Kurt Cobain said in a 1992 Melody Maker interview that Colossal Youth was one of the ten most influential records he had ever heard, and he also included it in a personal list of his 50 favourite albums. In the aforementioned interview, he spoke of his admiration for the album:

This music relaxes you, it's total atmospherics. It's just nice, pleasant music. I love it. The drum machine has to have the cheesiest sound ever. We're going to be on a Young Marble Giants compilation, doing "Credit in the Straight World".

Cobain's wife Courtney Love would later record "Credit in the Straight World" with her band Hole on their second album Live Through This, released in 1994. Stephin Merritt credited the album as the main inspiration for his band The Magnetic Fields's debut album Distant Plastic Trees, and has recorded a cover of "The Man Amplifier". Australian band Toys Went Berserk covered "Brand - New - Life" on their 1989 album The Smiler With A Knife.

Domino Recording Company released Colossal Youth & Collected Works, an expanded reissue of the album, on 9 July 2007. In May 2009, Colossal Youth was performed live in its entirety by Young Marble Giants as part of the All Tomorrow's Parties-curated Don't Look Back series.

In 2020, Rolling Stone included Colossal Youth in their "80 Greatest albums of 1980" list, praising the band for "creating an arresting, quiet sound ".

== Track listing ==
All tracks are written by Stuart Moxham, except where noted.

1. "Searching for Mr. Right" – 3:03
2. "Include Me Out" – 2:01
3. "The Taxi" – 2:07
4. "Eating Noddemix" (Philip Moxham, Alison Statton) – 2:04
5. "Constantly Changing" – 2:04
6. "N.I.T.A." – 3:31
7. "Colossal Youth" – 1:54
8. "Music for Evenings" – 3:02
9. "The Man Amplifier" – 3:15
10. "Choci Loni" (S. Moxham, P. Moxham) – 2:37
11. "Wurlitzer Jukebox!" – 2:45
12. "Salad Days" (S. Moxham, Statton) – 2:01
13. "Credit in the Straight World" – 2:29
14. "Brand - New - Life" – 2:55
15. "Wind in the Rigging" – 2:25

The 1993 reissue includes the following bonus tracks, taken from the Testcard EP, the "Final Day" single and the various artists compilation Is the War Over?:

16. "This Way" (S. Moxham, P. Moxham) – 1:41
17. "Posed by Models" (S. Moxham, P. Moxham) – 1:25
18. "The Clock" (S. Moxham, P. Moxham) – 1:39
19. "Clicktalk" (S. Moxham, P. Moxham) – 2:42
20. "Zebra Trucks" (S. Moxham, P. Moxham) – 1:33
21. "Sporting Life" (S. Moxham, P. Moxham) – 1:04
22. "Final Day" – 1:43
23. "Radio Silents" – 1:53
24. "Cake Walking" – 2:49
25. "Ode to Booker T" – 3:03

== Personnel ==
Credits are adapted from the album's liner notes.

Young Marble Giants

- Philip Moxham – bass, arrangement, production
- Stuart Moxham – guitar, organ, arrangement, production
- Alison Statton – vocals, arrangement, production

Additional personnel

- Dave Anderson – arrangement, engineering, production
- Patrick Graham – cover photography
- Porky – mastering

== Charts ==
Chart (1980–81)	Peak position
New Zealand Albums (RMNZ)	20
UK Independent Albums (Record Business)	3

Chart (2007)	Peak position
UK Albums (Official Charts)	163
UK Independent Albums (Official Charts)	13
