= Compañeros =

Compañero or Compañeros may refer to:

- "Compañero" is equivalent to "comrade" as a revolutionary-style form of address in Cuban Spanish
- Compañero, a single by Righeira duo
- Compañeros (film), a 1970 Zapata Western film directed by Sergio Corbucci
- Compañeros (TV series), a Spanish television series aired from 1998 to 2002
- Compañeros (album)
