= Embrace the Herd =

Studio album by The Gist
- Released: 1982
- Label: Rough Trade

Embrace the Herd is the sole studio album by English band The Gist, released in 1982 by record label Rough Trade.

== Track listing ==
1. Far Concern
2. Love At First Sight
3. Fretting Away
4. Public Girl
5. Clean Bridges
6. Simian
7. Embrace The Herd
8. Iambic Pentameter
9. Carnival Headache
10. Concrete Slopes
11. The Long Run
12. Dark Shots

== Credits ==
Produced and engineered by Phil Legg

- Stuart Moxham, vocals, arrangements and instruments (#1-5, 7–12)
- Phil Moxham, bass guitar (#2,5,9)
- Dave Dearnaley, electric guitar (#2,4,5), slide guitar (#5)
- Wendy Smith, vocals (#4,5)
- Alison Statton, vocals (#5)
- Viv Goldman, vocals (#5)
- Debbie Pritchard, vocals (#6)
- Lewis Mottram, instruments (#6)
- Nixon, vocals (#10)
- Jake Bowie, cymbal (#11)
- Charles Bullen, hi-hat, snare, tambourine (#11)
- Phil Legg, tom tom (#11)
- Epic Soundtracks (a.k.a. Kevin Paul Godfrey), drums (#12)

== Reception ==
Professional ratings
Review scores
Source	Rating
AllMusic	3/5 stars
Trouser Press	favourable

Trouser Press called it "a lovely little record".

It was ranked at number 41 on Mojo magazine's "Buried Treasures" list.
