= Compañeros (album) =

Studio album by Working Week
- Released: 1986
- Studio: Townhouse Studios, London; Good Earth Studios, London
- Genre: Soul jazz, latin jazz contemporary jazz
- Length: 44:55
- Label: Virgin
- Producer: Ben Rogan

Working Week chronology
Working Nights (1985)	Compañeros (1986)	Surrender (1987)

Compañeros is the second album by the British jazz dance band Working Week, released by Virgin Records in 1986.

== Track listing ==
1. "Too Much Time" (Don Van Vliet) – 4:01
2. "Dancing in Motion" (Simon Booth, Juliet Roberts, Larry Stabbins) – 4:10
3. "Friend (Touche Pas à Mon Pote)" (Booth, Stabbins) – 4:44
4. "South Africa" (Booth, Stabbins) – 4:53
5. "Shot in the Dark" (Booth, Roberts, Stabbins) – 4:54
6. "Soul Train" (Booth, Stabbins) – 4:45
7. "King of the Night" (Booth, Stabbins) – 5:20
8. "Touching Heaven" (Booth, Roberts, Stabbins) – 4:11
9. "Southern Cross" (Booth, Stabbins) – 7:58

== Personnel ==
Working Week

- Juliet Roberts – vocals
- Simon Booth – guitars
- Larry Stabbins – tenor and soprano saxophone and flute

with:

- Paul Spong – trumpet
- Richard Edwards – trombone
- Jess Bailey – keyboards
- Nick Graham – keyboards
- Iain Prince – keyboards
- Paul "Tubbs" Williams – bass
- Jeff Clyne – double bass
- Preston Heyman – drums
- Nic France – drums
- Frank Ricotti – percussion
- Bosco De Oliveira – percussion
- Tom Morley – drum programming
- Juliet Roberts, Wayne Hernandez, Angela Barfon, Candi Mackenzie, Michael Paul – backing vocals
- David Bedford – string arrangements

== Charts ==
=== Album charts ===
Year	Chart	Position
1986	UK album charts	#72
