= Weekend (Welsh band) =

Welsh independent rock band

Weekend were a Welsh band formed by Alison Statton in 1981, following the split of Young Marble Giants. The band was a merger between two projects. Statton began writing with Spike of Z Block Records and Reptile Ranch in Cardiff, Wales in the summer of 1981, before moving to London where she teamed up with Simon Emmerson (at that time using the name Simon Booth) of Methodishca Tune. The band signed to Rough Trade Records in December 1981, but recorded only one studio album, La Variete.

La Variete was released in 1982 on the Rough Trade label and made it to no. 4 in the UK Indie Chart staying there for 15 weeks. It was revered by critics on release as a bold new departure from the prevailing post-punk ethos, and served as a major influence on Saint Etienne, the Sundays, Belle and Sebastian and many others.

According to Cherry Red, La Variete is: "A beautifully realised and delicate collection of songs set against a jazz backdrop, it switches across myriad musical settings including samba, cabaret, Afrobeat and highly personal, confessional pop."

After splitting up in 1983, members Simon Booth and Larry Stabbins formed the more jazz orientated Working Week. The other members later reunited as a duo under the name "Alison Statton and Spike", issuing the albums Tidal Blues (1994), The Shady Tree (1997) and Bimini Twist (2018).

== Discography ==
Chart placings shown are from the UK Indie Chart.

=== Albums ===
- La Varieté LP (1982) - Rough Trade (No. 4)
- Live at Ronnie Scott’s - 12" mini-LP (1983) Rough Trade (No. 3)
- Nipped in the Bud (1984) - Rough Trade (includes tracks by Young Marble Giants and Gist)

=== Singles ===
- "The View from Her Room" / "Leaves of Spring" - 7" and 12" (1982) Rough Trade (No. 7)
- "Past Meets Present" / "Midnight Slows" - 7" (1982) Rough Trade (No. 6)
- "Drumbeat for Baby" / "Weekend Off" - 7" and 12" (1982) Rough Trade (No. 8)
- The '81 Demos EP (1995) - Vinyl Japan
