= Alison Statton =

Welsh singer

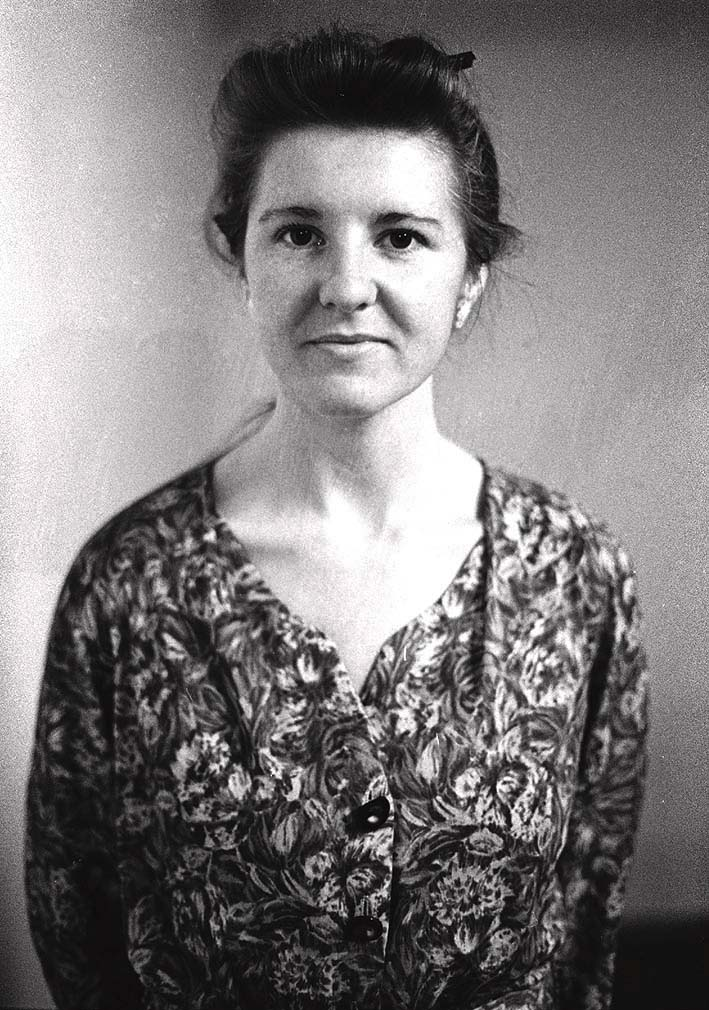
- Statton in 1989

Background information
- Born: March 1958 (age 68); Cardiff, Wales
- Genres: New wave, post-punk, jazz
- Years active: 1978–present
- Labels: Rough Trade, Les Disques du Crépuscule, Vinyl Japan

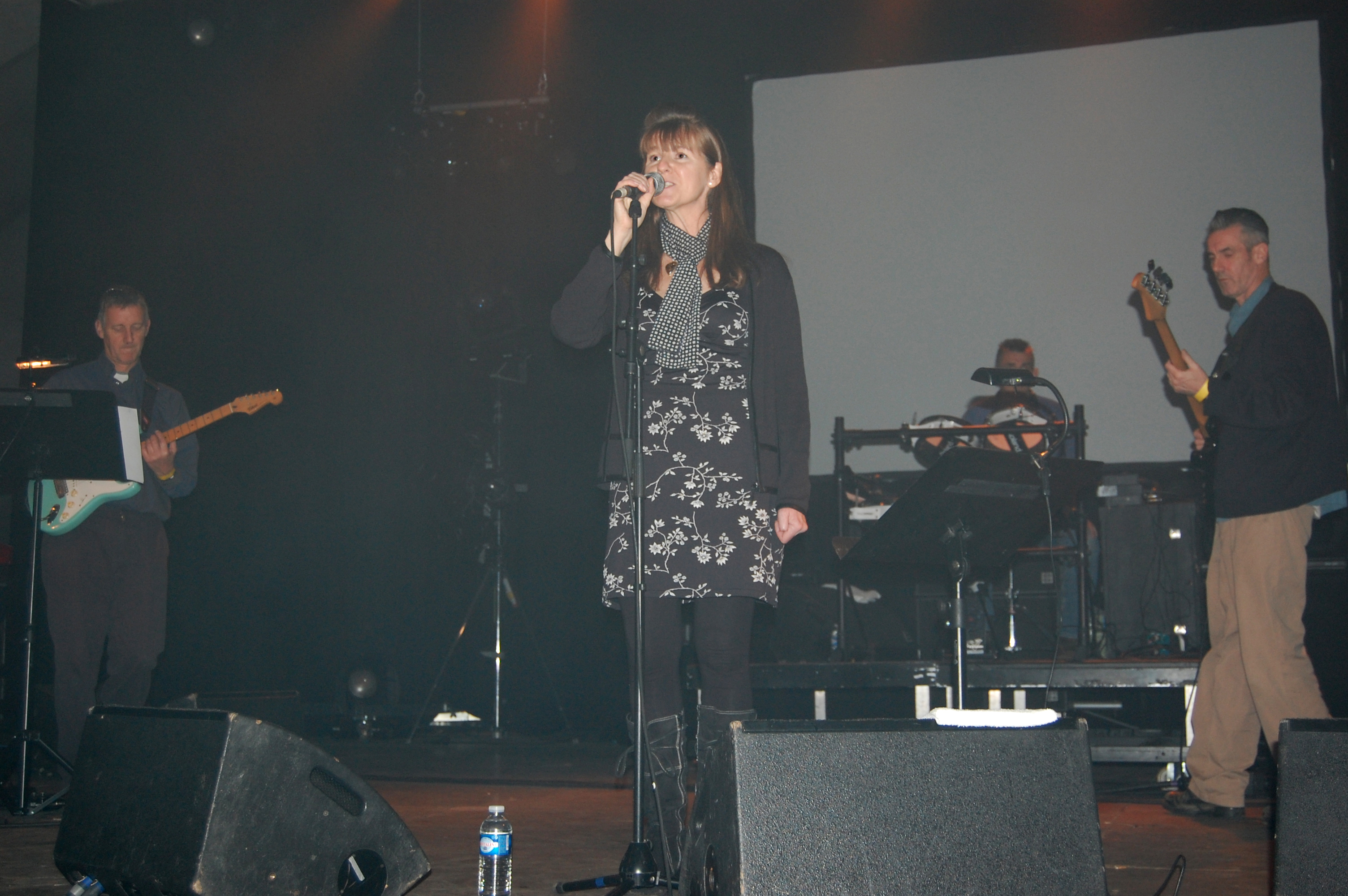
Young Marble Giants live at Factory Festival, Nivelles, Belgium, 1 November 2008

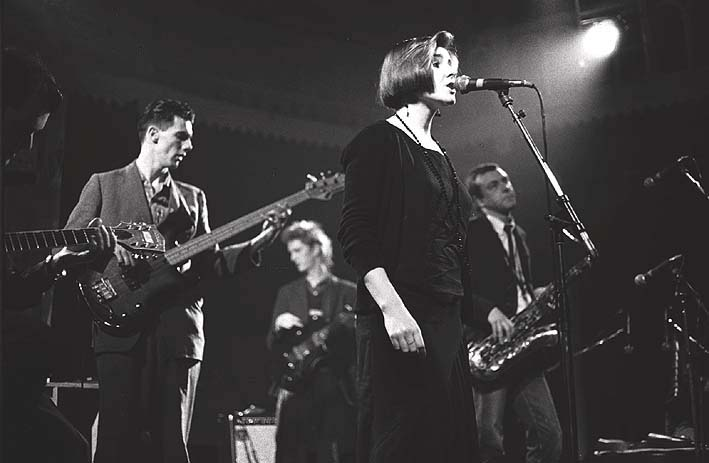
Weekend at the Paradiso, Amsterdam, 5 February 1983

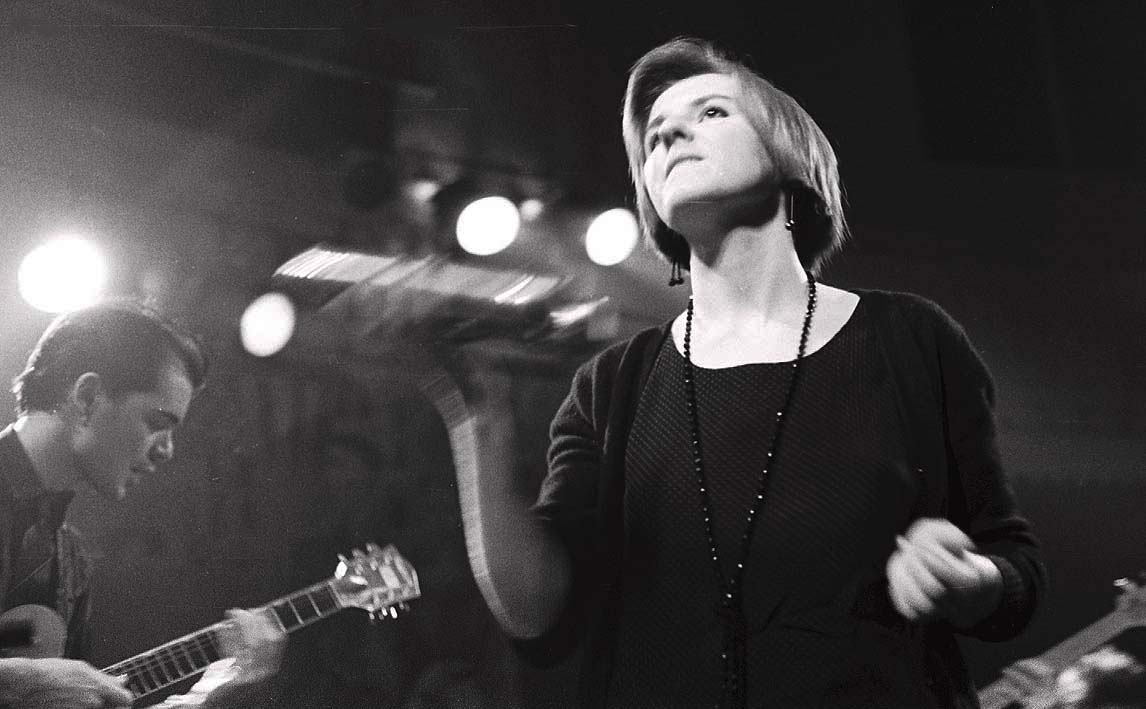
Weekend at the Paradiso, Amsterdam, 2 February 1983

Alison Statton (born March 1958) is a Welsh singer best known for her work with Young Marble Giants. Fans of the singer have included Kurt Cobain, Courtney Love, Stephin Merritt, Belle and Sebastian and Renato Russo.

== Musical career ==
Born in Cardiff, Statton's career in music began in 1978 as the singer for the band Young Marble Giants. After Young Marble Giants split up in 1981, she formed the jazz-influenced band Weekend with Simon Emmerson (Booth) and Spike Williams, releasing the album La Varieté in 1982 and a live EP, Live at Ronnie Scott's, the following year.

Statton returned to Cardiff and trained to be a chiropractor while teaching tai chi.

She returned to music in the late 1980s and released two recordings with the guitarist from Ludus, Ian Devine as 'Devine and Statton', The Prince of Wales (1989) and Cardiffians (1990).

After working with Devine, she released several records with Spike in the 1990s, starting with Weekend in Wales (1993).

Young Marble Giants reunited for a number of live performances from 2007 to 2015 in Europe, the last one in London at the Royal Festival Hall during the Meltdown Festival curated by David Byrne.

Statton's singing has been called "coolly unadorned", cool and dispassionate, and ghostly and fragile, with a "shy, singsong delivery". Her vocal style is considered influential on many of the indie pop artists that followed.

She presently works as a chiropractor.

== Recordings ==
=== With Young Marble Giants ===
- Colossal Youth (1980), Rough Trade
- Salad Days (2000), Vinyl Japan
- Live at the Hurrah (2004), Cherry Red
- Colossal Youth & Collected Works (2007), Domino

=== With Weekend ===
- La Variete (1982), Rough Trade
- Live at Ronnie Scott's (1983), Rough Trade
- Archive (2003), Vinyl Japan

=== Devine and Statton ===
- The Prince of Wales (1988), Les Disques du Crépuscule
- Cardiffians (1990), Les Disques Du Crépuscule

=== Alison Statton & Spike ===
- Weekend in Wales (1993), Vinyl Japan
- Tidal Blues (1994), Vinyl Japan
- Maple Snow (live album, 1995), Vinyl Japan
- The Shady Tree (1997), Vinyl Japan
- Bimini Twist (2018), Tiny Global Productions

=== Other appearances ===
- The Gist – Embrace the Herd (1982): vocals on "Clean Bridges"
- Stuart Moxham & The Original Artists – Signal Path (1992): vocals on "Knives (Always Fall)"
