= Toys Went Berserk =

Australian rock band

- Origin: Sydney, New South Wales, Australia
- Genres: Post-punk; alternative rock; gothic rock; noise rock
- Years active: 1985–1992; 1998; 2005; 2016; 2026
- Labels: Aberrant Records (1986 - 1991); Memorandum / Reverberation (2005); Trickster Music (2016)
- Past members: Lesley-Anne "Coo" Bennett; Andy Jarvis; Bill Quarry; Mark Nicholson; Steve Turbit (1986 - 1987); Carolyn Polley (1988)

Toys Went Berserk were an Australian post-punk/alternative rock band that formed in late 1985. They released three studio albums, Pieces (1987), The Smiler with a Knife (1989) and Sensory (1990), before disbanding in early 1992. They have performed reunion shows in 1998, 2005 and 2016.

== History ==
Toys Went Berserk were formed in Sydney at the end of 1985, featuring Lesley-Anne "Coo" Bennett on lead vocals and piano (ex-Lavender Disaster), Andy Jarvis on guitar (ex-Dusk Furrow), Mark Nicholson on drums (ex-Happy Hate Me Nots), Bill Quarry on bass guitar (ex-Box of Fish), and Steve Turbit on guitar. Lavender Disaster were a Perth-based band with Coo on lead vocals, Brett Ford on drums, Peter Hartley on guitar and Danny Vervest on bass. Both Ford and Hartley were later members of the Kryptonics and Lubricated Goat. In an interview, Bruce Griffiths, who released all of Toys' records on his Aberrant label, told Steve Gardner (Noise for Heroes), that the band "sounded like a 'tough Blondie'."

According to Australian musicologist, Ian McFarlane, Toys Went Berserk "derived [their] moniker from a lyric in the Siouxsie and the Banshees song 'Spellbound'." Their music (comparable to bands such as Skeletal Family, Siouxsie and the Banshees and Xmal Deutschland) and energetic live performances, was quite distinctive in the Sydney scene of the time. Gardner opined, "They aren't like the standard Sydney band, influenced by Detroit music, 'Burn My Eye' T-shirt on back, stacks of Marshalls behind them. They have other influences. As opposed to big distorted power chords or strong leads, the guitar tends to be more in the way of textured, treated chords; very echo-ey. The drumming is inventive yet driving, with many interesting touches to add spice to standard beats. The bass tends to be mixed back, while Coo's vocal provides a large part of the character and melody to the songs."

The group's first recording session, in June 1986, was at Sound Barrier studios, with Jonathan Summers as audio engineer. It yielded 3 tracks and the first to be released, "One Day (My Head Is Going to Explode)", appeared on a various artists' four-track EP, Trousers in Action No. 2, via Aberrant Records that August. The song was previously performed by Lavender Disaster and written by Coo's brother Phil Bennett. This was followed by the band's first single in October, "Guns at My Head", recorded at the same session as "One Day". Just a month later, they returned to Sound Barrier to cut their debut album "Pieces", which was released by Aberrant in early 1987, packaged as two 12" EPs, with 4 songs on each. In early 1988, Turbit was replaced briefly on guitar by Carolyn Polley and the band released two further singles "No Warning" and "Forever And A Day" that year.

In 1989, Toys Went Berserk slimmed to a four-piece and recorded their 2nd album "The Smiler with a Knife", with Rob Younger (Died Pretty, Dubrovniks, The Plunderers) producing at Trafalgar Studios. Commenting on Younger's production on the record, Gardner felt "[it] features the sort of clear and solid sound that he's becoming famous for. Yet the band had misgivings about using him at first; they are not at all interested in the Detroit sound, and they associated Younger with that, through his Birdman past. Although the new LP certainly isn't a Detroit metal record, there's no question it has a tougher, more immediate sound." "The Smiler with a Knife" came out on Aberrant on 7 November 1989 and also received a release on the German label Normal Records, with the prospect of a European tour.

Before the "Smiler..." LP was recorded, Polley had left to start indie band Dutiful Daughters and not long after joined indie rockers Big Heavy Stuff. Continuing now as a four-piece, in September 1990 Toys Went Berserk recorded their 3rd album "Sensory", at Fort Apache Studios, (near Boston) with Gary Smith (Throwing Muses, Pixies, the Chills) producing. While in the States, the band played their first international shows in Boston and also performed two live-to-air sets on college radio. "Sensory" was released in Australia in Feb 1991 and the band returned to the States in July the following year, to promote a US release on Matador. The 16 date tour started with a Matador Records showcase at CBGBs in New York but ultimately the label didn't put the album out.

Returning from the States, they performed two songs "Running Blind" and "Wheels In Motion" on Andrew Denton's ABC-TV program "Live And Sweaty". They also demoed tracks for a new album but despite some interest from overseas labels, it didn't eventuate and the band decided to call it a day in early 1992. During their 6 year life span, Toys Went Berserk supported international acts the Cramps, the Sugarcubes, the Fall, Dinosaur Jr. and the Selector and released six singles and three albums. Their goth-influenced version of Led Zeppelin's "Stairway to Heaven" was featured on Andrew Denton's ABC-TV show The Money or the Gun, and was later released on a various artists compilation album, Stairways to Heaven (1993).

== Afterwards ==
Following the break-up of Toys Went Berserk, Bennett and Jarvis, who were domestic partners, moved to England and started a new band, Feast (1993–98), followed by Houdini (1998–2001). In 2003 they returned to Perth and started their own record label, Trickster Music, releasing an album as Houdini Twins. Toys Went Berserk have regrouped for reunion shows: firstly in 1998, then in 2005, to promote the release of a compilation double album, "The Bitter & the Sweet: Best and Rarest". It included most of their studio releases, plus selected demos and live recordings. In 2016 the band performed a joint 30th anniversary show in Sydney, with contemporaries Ratcat, also releasing "World's Away EP". In 2026, Toys Went Berserk began making their back catalogue available on band camp, starting with a new set "Early Treasures", that compiles all the recordings from the band's first line up (including unreleased demos).

Bennett and Jarvis continued in other Perth-based outfits, Rocket to Memphis (RTM) and Catzilla. RTM released four CDs of swamp, rockabilly and garage rock n roll music, "Swampwater Shuffle" (2007), "Hip-Shakin' Voodoo" (2009), "Jungle Juice" (2011) and "Do the Crawl" (2013) plus two vinyl singles, "I'm Bad" (2011) and "Go Go" (2013). The band also toured Japan and the United Kingdom. Catzilla's garage rock n roll, features Bennett on vocals and keyboards and Jarvis on guitar. The band released a vinyl EP, "Going Wild" (2016), a self-titled album in 2017 and have also toured Japan. Bennett and Jarvis continue to write original music and perform live with various bands, including Bang Bang Betty & the H-Bombs and their duo The Pick Me Ups.

== Discography ==
=== Albums ===
- Pieces (2 x 12" 1987)
- The Smiler With A Knife (12" LP and CD 1989)
- Sensory (12" LP and CD 1991)

=== Compilations ===
- Pieces (plus first recordings) (12" LP, 2005)
- The Bitter & The Sweet – Best & Rarest (CD, 2005)
- Worlds Away EP (CD, 2016)
- Early Treasures (digital, 2026)

=== Singles ===
- Guns At My Head / Don't Run Away (7", 1986)
- No Warning / Inseparable (7", 1988)
- Forever And A Day / Something Better (7", 1988)
- Have No More / Salvation / See The Man / (12", 1989)
- Brand New Life / Stairway To Heaven (7", 1990)
- Wheels In Motion / Spot (7", 1990)
