= Encore (Brian Auger and Julie Tippetts album) =

Studio album by Brian Auger and Julie Driscoll
- Released: April 1978
- Recorded: October – November 1977
- Studio: Different Fur Studios, San Francisco
- Genre: Jazz fusion, progressive rock
- Length: 36:36
- Label: Warner Bros.
- Producer: Brian Auger

Brian Auger and Julie Driscoll chronology
Streetnoise (1969)	Encore (1978)

Encore is a 1978 album by Brian Auger and Julie Driscoll (billed as Julie Tippetts). It was the duo's first album of new material in nine years since their previous album, Streetnoise.

== Background ==
Brian Auger and Julie Driscoll recorded and performed together from 1965 to 1970, first in the band Steampacket alongside Rod Stewart and Long John Baldry, and then as Julie Driscoll, Brian Auger and The Trinity. Driscoll recorded her first solo album in 1971, titled 1969; one of the musicians was pianist Keith Tippett, whom Driscoll married, taking a version of his name. Tippetts and Auger went their separate ways for most of the next decade, but reunited for Encore. They recorded the album in late 1977, and it was released in 1978.

Cherry Red Records reissued the album in May 2023, with a new essay by Sid Smith.

== Reception ==
Professional ratings
Review scores
Source	Rating
AllMusic	3/5 stars
The Encyclopedia of Popular Music	2/5 stars
Jazzwise	4/5 stars

The album received little notice upon its release in 1978; Auger later joked that Warner Bros. “pressed 30,000 copies and forgot about it.”. However, it has come to be regarded as a minor classic, especially since its reissue in 2023. Writing in AllMusic, Thom Jurek wrote, “Listening to Encore in the 21st century is nearly a revelation. Auger, for his part as the band's musical director on his trademark B-3, acoustic piano, and a slew of electronic keyboards, is a strictly no-BS performer. He's as straight-ahead as they get, and Julie Tippetts understands that the root of the song is in its intention. Together, they make a nearly flawless pair on these nine cuts.” Reviewing the reissue, Jon Newey in Jazzwise wrote, "It may be over four decades old but in spirit, message and sheer uplifting musicality it's uncannily on-point today." Dave Thompson in Goldmine agreed, specifying that "Jack Bruce's 'Rope Ladder to the Moon' reminds us that Cream was always the dullest thing its composer ever did; and the Winwood/Capaldi composed 'No Time To Live' recaptures everything you loved about Driscoll’s voice in the first place, but with the benefit of 10 more years in which to improve."

== Track listing ==
Side one

1. "Spirit" (Al Jarreau) – 4:06
2. "Don’t Let Me Be Misunderstood" (Bennie Benjamin, Horace Ott, Sol Marcus) – 3:32
3. "Git Up" (Brian Auger) – 3:46
4. "Freedom Highway" (Pops Staples) – 2:49
5. "Future Pilot" (Brian Auger) – 4:21

Side two

1. "Rope Ladder to the Moon" (Jack Bruce, Pete Brown) – 3:01
2. "No Time to Live" (Jim Capaldi, Steve Winwood) – 6:14
3. "Nothing Will Be as It Was" (Milton Nascimento, Ronaldo Bastos, R. Vince) – 3:44
4. "Lock All the Gates" (Al Jarreau) – 5:03

== Personnel ==
- Brian Auger – producer, arranger, organ, electric piano, acoustic bass, piano [acoustic], synthesizer, tambourine, cowbell, percussion, vocals on track B3
- Julie Driscoll – vocals
- George Doering – guitar
- David McDaniels – bass
- Dave Crigger – drums
- Jessica Smith – backing vocals
- Julia Waters Tillman – backing vocals
- Maxine Waters Willard – backing vocals

Technical

- Joe Tuzen – engineer
- Seth Dworkin – engineer
- Bruce Steinberg – album design and photography
