= Septober Energy =

Studio album by Centipede
- Released: October 1971
- Recorded: June 1971
- Studio: Wessex, London
- Genre: Jazz fusion, jazz rock, free jazz, progressive rock
- Length: 85:23
- Label: Neon (RCA)
- Producer: Robert Fripp

US album cover (RCA)

Professional ratings
Review scores
Source	Rating
Allmusic	2.5/5 stars
All About Jazz	3/5 stars
The Penguin Guide to Jazz Recordings	3/4 stars

Septober Energy is the only album of the jazz/progressive rock big band Centipede. Produced by Robert Fripp under the musical direction of Keith Tippett, it was originally released 1971 in the UK as a double LP, and 1974 in the US with a different cover. The album was recorded at Wessex Studios, London during three days in June 1971. The album is a four-part suite consisting of four tracks of about 20 minutes each.

A remastered CD release (from the original master tapes), using the USA cover, was released in 2000 by BGO. All previous authorized CD releases (on the What Next? and Disconforme labels) were mastered from vinyl sources.

Septober Energy - Part 4 is based on the instrumental track Green and Orange Night Park that was part of The Keith Tippett Group's 1970 album Dedicated To You, But You Weren't Listening.

Another version, titled Septober Energy and including vocals, can be found on the album The Bristol Concert by Mujician and The Georgian Ensemble, recorded 1991.

== Sleeve notes ==
Writing in the sleeve notes, Robert Wyatt said:

"Of course I can't tell you anything about this music, because that would be silly, and I can't examine publicly Keith's murky motives for dreaming up this insane travelling circus known as 'Centipede'. If I were to talk about how Fripp coped with the unprecedented production problems in such a short space of time, I'd be wasting yours, because the job's done now and I never really understood the technical details anyway. Should I try to explain Julie's lyrics? Of course not! ... I shall, however, leave you with a brief, but important message from Nick Evans: "Wah-Hay"."

== Track listing ==
Septober Energy Sample
An audio sample of "Septober Energy" (Part 2) (1971)

Disc 1

1. "Septober Energy - Part 1" – 21:43
2. "Septober Energy - Part 2" – 23:34

Disc 2

1. "Septober Energy - Part 3" – 21:21
2. "Septober Energy - Part 4" – 18:45

== Personnel ==
=== Violins ===
- Wendy Treacher
- John Trussler
- Roddy Skeaping
- Wilf Gibson (lead)
- Carol Slater
- Louise Jopling
- Garth Morton
- Channa Salononson
- Steve Rowlandson
- Mica Comberti
- Colin Kitching
- Philip Saudek
- Esther Burgi

=== Cellos ===
- Michael Hurwitz
- Timothy Kraemer
- Suki Towb
- John Rees-Jones
- Katherine Thulborn
- Catherine Finnis

=== Trumpets ===
- Peter Parkes
- Mick Collins
- Ian Carr (doubling flugelhorn)
- Mongezi Feza (pocket cornet)
- Mark Charig (cornet)

=== Alto saxes ===
- Elton Dean (doubling saxello)
- Jan Steele (doubling flute)
- Ian McDonald
- Dudu Pukwana

=== Tenor saxes ===
- Larry Stabbins
- Gary Windo
- Brian Smith
- Alan Skidmore

=== Baritone saxes ===
- Dave White (doubling clarinet)
- Karl Jenkins (doubling oboe)
- John Williams (bass saxophone, doubling soprano)

=== Trombones ===
- Nick Evans
- Dave Amis
- Dave Perrottet
- Paul Rutherford

=== Drums ===
- John Marshall (and all percussion)
- Tony Fennell
- Robert Wyatt

=== Vocalists ===
- Maggie Nicols
- Julie Tippett (née Driscoll)
- Mike Patto
- Zoot Money
- Boz Burrell

=== Basses ===
- Roy Babbington (doubling bass guitar)
- Gill Lyons
- Harry Miller
- Jeff Clyne
- Dave Markee
- Brian Belshaw

=== Guitars ===
- Brian Godding

=== Piano ===
- Keith Tippett - musical director

=== Technical credits ===
- Robert Fripp - producer
- Mike Thompson - engineer
- Dick Whitehead - album design (US release)
- Martin Adelman - cover photograph (US release)

Band members not on the recording: Robert Fripp (guitar) and Paul Nieman (trombone)
