= 33 1/3 Revolutions per Monkee =

- Created by: Jack Good
- Written by: Jack Good; Art Fisher
- Directed by: Art Fisher
- Starring: The Monkees; Julie Driscoll; Brian Auger; Jerry Lee Lewis; Fats Domino; Little Richard; Clara Ward; Buddy Miles; Paul Arnold; We Three
- Country of origin: United States
- Original language: English

Production
- Producer: Jack Good
- Running time: 53 mins.
- Production company: Screen Gems

Original release
- Network: NBC
- Release: April 14, 1969

Related
- The Monkees; Hey, Hey, It's the Monkees

33 1/3 Revolutions per Monkee is a television special starring The Monkees that aired on NBC on April 14, 1969. The musical guests included Jerry Lee Lewis, Fats Domino, Little Richard, the Clara Ward Singers, the Buddy Miles Express, Paul Arnold and the Moon Express and We Three. The special was produced by Jack Good, creator of the television series Shindig!.

Julie Driscoll and Brian Auger (with their backing band the Trinity) also played a prominent role. This special is notable as the Monkees' final performance as a quartet until 1986, as Peter Tork left the group at the end of the special's production.

== Plot ==
The story follows Brian Auger and his assistant Julie Driscoll as they take the Monkees through various stages of evolution until they are ready to brainwash the world via commercial exploitation. Trapped in giant test tubes, the four are stripped of all personal identity and names: Micky Dolenz becomes Monkee #1, Peter Tork becomes Monkee #2, Michael Nesmith Monkee #3 and Davy Jones Monkee #4.

Auger and Driscoll observe each of the Monkees' minds as the group attempt to regain their stripped personal identities through their fantasies. Micky performs an R&B up-tempo duet remake of "I'm a Believer" with Driscoll. Peter reclines on a giant cushion in eastern garb and, with musical backing by sitar and tabla, performs the gentle "I Prithee (Do Not Ask for Love)". Mike, in a chroma-key sequence, sings a country song, "Naked Persimmon". Davy sings and dances to "Goldilocks Sometime" as a toy. Auger finds their fantasies interesting and proceeds with the brainwash.

Now under Auger's control, the Monkees perform like stiff-legged wind-up robots ("Wind-Up Man"). Auger, displeased with their wooden performance, introduces a four-part harmony with pianos stacked atop each other, with Auger and his Wurlitzer electric piano on top, then descending to Jerry Lee Lewis, Little Richard and Fats Domino on the bottom. Charles Darwin appears and, disapproving of Auger's methods, introduces him and the Monkees to evolution in the form of a psychedelic dance performance ("Only the Fittest Shall Survive"). Darwin turns the Monkees back into apes ("I Go Ape") and allows Auger, Driscoll and the Trinity to work from there, and Driscoll sings "Come On Up". Several times during the mayhem, Trinity drummer Clive Thacker appears exclaiming "I don't believe it!"

With the process complete, Auger introduces the Monkees to a gig at the Paramount Theater on December 7, 1956 and describes them as "idolized, plasticized, psychoanalyzed and sterilized". The Monkees, dressed in outlandish 1950s vocal-group gear, launch into a classic 1950s rock medley: "At the Hop", "Shake a Tail Feather", "Little Darlin'" and "Peppermint Twist", backed by Lewis, Richard, Domino, We Three and the Clara Ward Singers. The guest performers contributed their own songs to the medley, with the Ward Singers performing "Dem Bones" as the segment's finale.

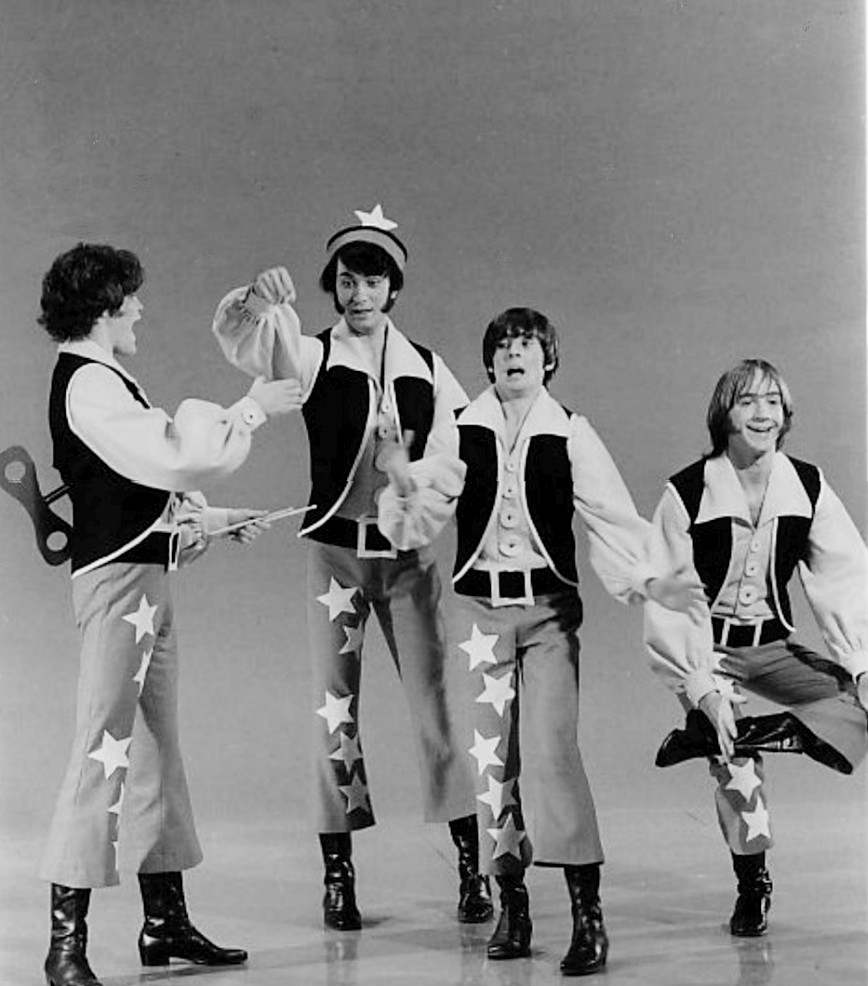
Scene from the special

Auger and Driscoll break character and announce that they have had enough of the show's brainwashing plot, stating that they would rather have "complete and total freedom" (which Driscoll describes as "utter bloody shambles"), thus introducing the final act.

In a warehouse full of instruments and props, Davy stands atop a high staircase performing Bill Dorsey's "String for My Kite". Peter enters the scene and performs, on a Hohner Clavinet, Solfeggietto by Carl Philipp Emmanuel Bach. Mike and Micky arrive and perform "Listen to the Band", with Mike playing his Gibson Les Paul Custom "Black Beauty", Peter on keyboards, Micky on drums and Davy on tambourine. As the song progresses, they are joined by Auger, Driscoll, Buddy Miles and an assortment of partygoers and musicians until the music transforms into a climactic frantic cacophony. The camera zooms out to a book with "Chaos Is Come Again" on the next page. The book closes with "The Beginning of the End" on the front cover.

The closing credits feature a reversed scene from the Moon Express' dance sequence, with Peter singing a modified version of the song "California, Here I Come".

== Production ==
After production ended on the second season of The Monkees in December 1967, the series' future was uncertain. The Monkees wanted to dispense with the sitcom format and retool the show. NBC considered ordering a 26-episode third season, but Bert Schneider of Raybert Productions attempted to negotiate with the network to produce eight one-hour specials instead. On February 20, 1968, NBC officially canceled the series, as the program's sponsors were unsatisfied with its ratings. In April, Monkees Monthly reported the network had ordered three one-hour specials starring the group.

Production on 33 1/3 Revolutions per Monkee began after the group finished their Far East tour. Producer Jack Good reworked the premise of an earlier TV special he had produced, Innocence, Anarchy and Soul, which also featured Jerry Lee Lewis, Julie Driscoll, and Brian Auger and the Trinity. According to Monkees Monthly, The Monkees reportedly requested a rewrite of the script before taping began, as they considered it "sloppy" in its current state. Raybert Productions, which had produced The Monkees' TV series and Head, was only minimally involved with the special, with no involvement from Bob Rafelson or Schneider.

On November 11, 1968, recording began on the musical numbers for the special with the backing tracks for "I Go Ape", "Wind Up Man", and an unused version of "String For My Kite". The following day, backing tracks were recorded for "Naked Persimmon" and "(I Prithee) Do Not Ask For Love" at United Recorders. Bones Howe produced both sessions. On November 18, Michael Nesmith produced backing tracks for "Goldie Locks Sometime", a new version of "String For My Kite", and "Darwin" at Wally Heider Recording. Vocals were added later.

The program was videotaped at MGM Studios in Culver City from November 23 to 27, 1968. Taping was originally set to take place at NBC, but a musicians' strike meant production had to be moved elsewhere. Micky Dolenz recalled that the special was recorded from outdoor broadcast trucks parked outside the soundstages. Dolenz and Driscoll's duet of "I'm a Believer" and the "Listen to the Band" finale were recorded live during production. Peter Tork made plans to leave the group during the making of the special, and later received a watch from the other members with the engraved message "To Peter from the guys at work." After taping ended, Brendan Cahill produced "California, Here It Comes" with vocals by Tork at Wally Heider Recording on December 17. On December 21, New Musical Express reported that Tork had officially left the group.

== Songs ==
No official soundtrack album was ever released. In 2010, Rhino Handmade issued "California, Here It Comes" on the second disc of the Head: Deluxe Edition CD box set. In 2011, Rhino Handmade released backing tracks and complete versions of several songs from the special on the third disc of The Monkees' Instant Replay: Deluxe Edition CD box set. The finished masters of the songs produced for the special are no longer known to exist, with the exception of the master tape for "California, Here It Comes".

The following songs are featured in the special:

- The Monkees: "(Theme From) The Monkees" (extract only)
- Micky Dolenz and Julie Driscoll: "I'm a Believer (Blues)"
- Peter Tork: "I Prithee (Do Not Ask for Love)"
- Michael Nesmith: "Naked Persimmon"
- Davy Jones: "Goldilocks Sometime"
- The Monkees: "Wind Up Man"
- The Monkees: "Darwin"
- Paul Arnold and the Moon Express: "Only the Fittest Shall Survive"
- The Monkees: "I Go Ape"
- Julie Driscoll, Brian Auger and the Trinity: "Come On Up"
- Medley:
  - The Monkees: "At the Hop"
  - Fats Domino: "I'm Ready"
  - Jerry Lee Lewis: "Whole Lotta Shakin' Goin' On"
  - Little Richard: "Tutti Frutti"
  - We Three and the Monkees: "Shake a Tail Feather"
  - Fats Domino: "Blue Monday"
  - The Monkees: "Little Darlin'"
  - Little Richard: "Long Tall Sally"
  - Jerry Lee Lewis: "Down the Line"
  - The Clara Ward Singers: "Dem Bones"
- Davy Jones: "String for My Kite"
- Peter Tork: "Solfeggietto" by Carl Philipp Emanuel Bach
- The Monkees and cast: "Listen to the Band"
- Peter Tork: "California, Here I Come" (end titles)

== Broadcast and reception ==
NBC broadcast 33 1/3 Revolutions per Monkee on April 14, 1969. In "certain areas, mainly the West Coast", the special aired against the 41st Academy Awards on ABC. In the UK, the special premiered on May 24 on BBC2. In Australia, ATN7 aired the special on November 16.

The special generally received poor reviews. An anonymous reviewer for the Youngstown Vindicator praised the "Wind-Up Man" number, but called the special's themes "confused to say the least". "Little Freddy Funn" of The Michigan Daily gave the program a negative review, calling it "incomprehensible, a waste of time and specially talent, and a crummy hour of cheap camera tricks. [...] Hopefully, it was the last Monkey special." Conversely, The Washington Afro-American gave the special a positive review, calling it "a wild hour of entertainment and music – if you saw it" and praising the inclusion of older and newer rock performers in the cast. Steven H. Scheuer printed several negative viewer responses regarding the special in his TV Key Mailbag column, noting "We always try to print nice comments along with the negative ones [...] but in the case of "33 1/3 Revolutions Per Monkee," there just haven't been any nice comments (at least not yet)." When the special premiered in Australia, Lenore Nicklin of The Sydney Morning Herald described the program as "an hour of visual and sound chaos but then you can't expect a really good revolution to be bloodless". Roger Aldridge of The Age praised the special, writing "For once, the artists, music, choreography, camera work, special effects and editing were Televised–that is the medium itself was the star and all else was adapted to suit it."

Nesmith and Tork later both compared the special to Head. Tork said, "I think it's the story that wanted to be told. I think that 33 1/3 is more human in that sense." Davy Jones said the group were not used to their "full capacity" in the special, while Dolenz said they felt like "our own special guests on our own television special."

Eric Lefcowitz praised the special in his 1985 book The Monkees Tale, calling it "one of the great lost artifacts of rock 'n' roll". In 1986, Glenn A. Baker wrote, "If the Monkees' self-mockery went over the heads of their dwindling fans in Head, it was brutally shoved down their throats in this television special". In 2005, Andrew Sandoval described the special as "something of a social time capsule", and wrote that it was hampered by "its use - or non-use - of The Monkees", although he praised the inclusion of the group's solo numbers.

== Home media ==
In 1995, Rhino Home Video released 33 1/3 Revolutions per Monkee on VHS as part of The Monkees Deluxe Limited Edition Box Set, which contained all 58 episodes of the series. The special later received a standalone video release, which peaked at number 27 on Billboard's Top Music Videos chart in March 1997. On November 18, 2003, the special was released on DVD by Rhino as a bonus feature on The Monkees: Season Two box set. The set was reissued on September 27, 2011 by Eagle Rock Entertainment. On July 8, 2016, Rhino released the special on Blu-ray as part of The Monkees: The Complete Series box set. "Whole Lotta Shakin' Goin' On" was omitted from the medley on the Blu-ray release due to clearance issues with the song's publishing.
