= Steampacket =

British musical group

- Steampacket members: Rod Stewart, Long John Baldry, Julie Driscoll and Brian Auger

Background information
- Origin: London
- Genres: Rock; British R&B
- Years active: 1965–1966
- Label: Charly Records
- Members: Long John Baldry; Rod Stewart; Julie Driscoll; Brian Auger; Vic Briggs; Ricky Fenson; Micky Waller

Steampacket (sometimes shown as Steam Packet) was a British blues band formed in 1965 by Long John Baldry with Rod Stewart, Julie Driscoll, and organist Brian Auger.

== History ==
A musical revue rather than a single group, Steampacket was formed in 1965 by Long John Baldry after the break-up of his previous group the Hoochie Coochie Men. It included Rod Stewart who had been with Baldry in the Hoochie Coochie Men, vocalist Julie Driscoll, organist Brian Auger, guitarist Vic Briggs, Richard Brown aka Ricky Fenson on bass guitar and Micky Waller on drums. They were managed by Giorgio Gomelsky, who had previously been involved with the Rolling Stones and the Yardbirds.

Steampacket played at various clubs, theatres and student unions around the country, including supporting the Rolling Stones on their 1965 British tour. Because of contractual difficulties, however, they never formally recorded a studio or live album. Tracks from some demo tapes they recorded at a rehearsal in the Marquee Club were released in 1970 on the French label BYG as Rock Generation: Volume 6 - The Steampacket (Or the First Supergroup). The same material was later re-released under other titles, including First of the Supergroups: Early Days and The First Supergroup: Steampacket Featuring Rod Stewart, to cash in on Stewart's success.

== Aftermath ==
Stewart left in early 1966, followed by Long John Baldry a few months later, and the group disbanded soon after. Long John Baldry then joined Bluesology which included a then unknown Elton John on keyboards, before pursuing a solo career, having a number 1 hit record in the UK Singles Chart in 1967 with "Let the Heartaches Begin". Julie Driscoll, Brian Auger and Vic Briggs formed Trinity, with Briggs departing later in 1966 to join Eric Burdon and The Animals. Julie Driscoll, Brian Auger and The Trinity had a UK hit in 1968 with "This Wheel's on Fire". Rod Stewart later sang with the Jeff Beck Group, Faces, and as a solo artist. There is an urban legend that Peter Green and Mick Fleetwood, later of Fleetwood Mac, played with Steampacket. In fact Steampacket, with the exception of Rod Stewart's departure, had the same personnel from its inception to its disintegration. The group that Green and Fleetwood played in alongside Rod Stewart was Shotgun Express.

== Lineup ==
- Long John Baldry – vocals
- Rod Stewart – vocals
- Julie Driscoll – vocals
- Brian Auger – organ
- Vic Briggs – guitar
- Richard Brown aka Ricky Fenson – bass guitar
- Micky Waller – drums
