= Brian Auger =

English keyboardist (b. 1939)

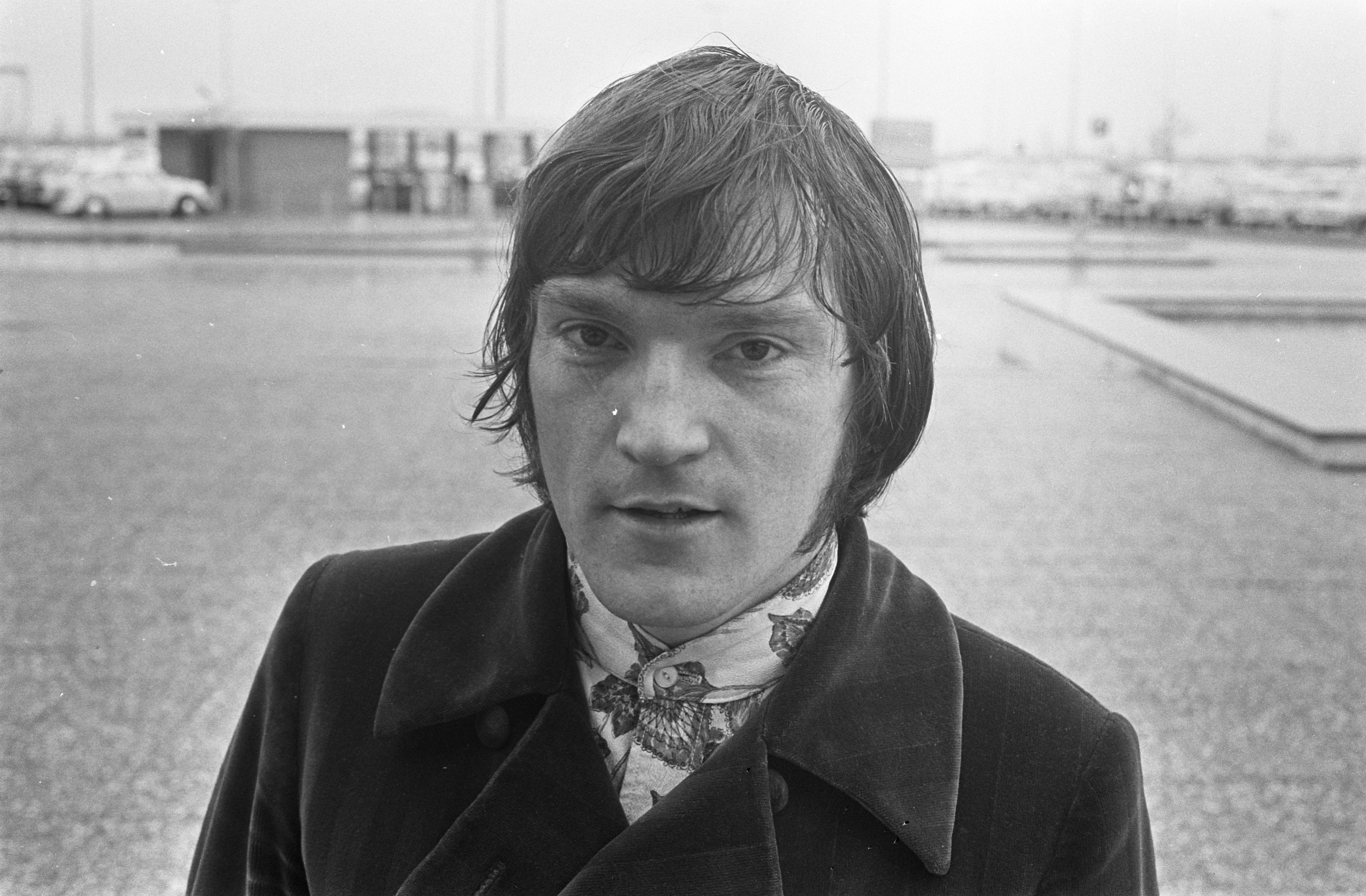
- Auger at Amsterdam Airport Schiphol, 1968

Background information
- Born: Brian Albert Gordon Auger; 18 July 1939 (age 87); Hammersmith, London, England
- Genres: Blues rock; jazz rock; funk rock; progressive rock
- Occupation: Musician
- Instruments: Organ; keyboards
- Years active: 1960s–present
- Website: brianauger.com

Brian Albert Gordon Auger (born 18 July 1939) is an English jazz rock and rock keyboardist who specialises in the Hammond organ.

Auger has worked with Rod Stewart, Tony Williams, Jimi Hendrix, John McLaughlin, Sonny Boy Williamson, Eric Burdon, and CAB. He has incorporated jazz, early British pop, R&B, soul music, and rock into his sound. He has been nominated for a Grammy Award.

== Career ==
In 1965, Auger played on "For Your Love" by the Yardbirds as a session musician. He was brought in to play the Hammond organ, but settled for the only available keyboard, the harpsichord. That same year, Auger formed the group the Steampacket with Long John Baldry, Julie Driscoll, Vic Briggs, and Rod Stewart. Due to contractual problems there were no official recordings made by the band; nevertheless, nine tracks were laid down for promotional use in late 1965 and released as an LP in 1970 in France on the BYG label. They were released on a CD by Repertoire Records in 1990 (licensed from Charly Records) as well as 12 live tracks from Live at the Birmingham Town Hall, February 2, 1964. Stewart left in early 1966 and soon thereafter the band broke up.

=== The Trinity ===
With Driscoll and the band Trinity, he went on to record a cover version of David Ackles' "Road to Cairo" and Bob Dylan's "This Wheel's on Fire", which appeared on Dylan Covered. The latter track was a number 5 pop hit in the UK. In 1969 Auger, Driscoll, and Trinity performed in the United States on the NBC special 33⅓ Revolutions Per Monkee. Auger and Driscoll stopped performing together after the 1969 album Streetnoise, but reunited for the 1978 album Encore.

=== Brian Auger's Oblivion Express ===
In 1970, he formed the jazz fusion ensemble Brian Auger's Oblivion Express shortly after abandoning the abortive "Wassenaar Arrangement" jazz rock commune in a small suburb of The Hague. Oblivion Express cultivated the talents of several notable musicians, including Average White Band drummers Robbie McIntosh and Steve Ferrone, as well as guitarist Jim Mullen.

According to the 13 December 1970 issue of The Baltimore Sun, the line up comprised Brian Auger on keyboards, Jim Mullen on guitar, Barry Dean on bass, and Keith Bailey on drums. Another musician, saxophonist Alan Skidmore, was expected to join the group in the near future.

In 1971 Auger produced and appeared on Mogul Thrash's only album, Mogul Thrash. Two members of that band, Roger Ball and Malcolm Duncan, would go on to form the Average White Band.

=== Maestro ===
Auger toured with Kim Simmonds, Gregg Errico, and Tim Bogert in the mid-1980s in a band they called Maestro. No album resulted from this collaboration and tour. In 1986, he played keyboards for the Italian singer Mango on the album Odissea.

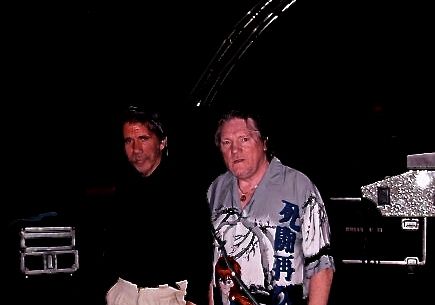
Auger (right) after a show at the Cabaret de Monte-Carlo with bassist-arranger Pino Presti in 2006

==== Further activities ====
In 1989, Auger was musical director for the thirteen-part film retrospective series Villa Fantastica made for German television. A live recording of the series, Super Jam (1990), features Auger on piano, Pete York on drums, Dick Morrissey on tenor saxophone, Roy Williams on trombone, Harvey Weston on bass guitar, and singers Zoot Money and Maria Muldaur.

Auger toured with Eric Burdon in the early 1990s and recorded the live album Access All Areas with him in 1993. Oblivion Express was revived in 2005 with recording and touring. The group featured Brian Auger, his son Karma Auger on drums, his daughter Savannah Auger on vocals, and Derek Frank on bass.

In 2012, Auger released Language of the Heart, one of the few solo albums of his career, produced by Tea. It features Jeff "Skunk" Baxter and Julian Coryell on guitars.

In 2014, Auger was invited by producer Gerry Gallagher to record with El Chicano as well as Alphonse Mouzon, David Paich, Alex Ligertwood, Ray Parker Jr., Lenny Castro, Vikki Carr, Pete Escovedo, Peter Michael Escovedo, Salvador Santana, Jessy J, Marcos J. Reyes, Siedah Garrett, Walfredo Reyes Jr., and Spencer Davis. In the same year, Brian Auger and Oblivion Express played at the KJAZZ festival in Los Angeles, and toured in Japan and Europe with Karma Auger on drums, daughter Ali Auger on vocals, Alex Ligertwood on vocals, Yarone Levy on guitar, Les King on bass, and Travis Carlton on bass.

== Discography ==
=== With Steampacket ===
- Rock Generation, Volume 6: The Steampacket (Or the First Supergroup) (BYG 529.706, 1970)

=== As leader ===
- Open with Julie Driscoll (Marmalade/Atco, 1967)
- Definitely What! (Marmalade/Atco, 1968)
- Streetnoise with Julie Driscoll (Marmalade/Atco, 1969)
- Jools & Brian with Julie Driscoll [Compilation of early singles] (Capitol, 1969)
- Befour (RCA Victor, 1970) No. 184 on the Billboard Top LPs
- The Best of Brian Auger [Compilation] (RCA Victor, 1977; later expanded/released as a 2-CD set by One Way)
- Encore with Julie Tippetts (Warner Bros., 1978)
- Search Party (Headfirst, 1981)
- Here and Now (Polydor, 1982 [1984])
- Access All Areas Live with Eric Burdon (SPV Records, 1993)
- Auger Rhythms: Brian Auger's Musical History [Compilation] (Ghostown, 2003)
- Live at the Baked Potato (Ghostown, 2005)
- Mod Party featuring Savannah Grace (Ghostown, 2011 [2013])
- Language of the Heart (Ghostown, 2012)
- Train Keeps A-Rolling with Jeff Golub (E1/eOne Music, 2013)
- Back to the Beginning: The Brian Auger Anthology (Soul Bank Music, 9/2015)
- Back to the Beginning... Again: The Brian Auger Anthology, Volume 2 (Soul Bank Music, 9/2016)
- Full Circle: Live at Bogies (Freestyle, 2018)
- Introspection [Compilation] (Sunset Blvd, 2020)
- Auger Incorporated [Compilation] (Soul Bank Music, 2/2022)
- Search Party [Reissue] (Soul Bank Music, 4/2022)
- Far Horizons – The Trinity Box Set (5-LP box set) [Vinyl reissues of Open, Definitely What!, Streetnoise, and Befour] (Soul Bank Music, 9/2022)

=== With the Oblivion Express ===
- Brian Auger's Oblivion Express (RCA Victor, 1970 [1971])
- A Better Land (RCA Victor, 1971)
- Second Wind (RCA Victor, 1972) No. 170 on the Billboard Top LPs
- Closer to It! (RCA Victor, 1973)
- Straight Ahead (RCA Victor, 1973 [1974])
- Live Oblivion, Vol. 1 (RCA Victor, 1974)
- Live Oblivion, Vol. 2 (RCA Victor, 1974 [1976])
- Reinforcements (RCA Victor, 1975)
- Happiness Heartaches (Warner Bros., 1977)
- Keys to the Heart (One Way, 1987 [1996])
- Voices of Other Times (Sanctuary, 1999)
- Looking in the Eye of the World (Ghostown, 2005)
- Live at the Baked Potato (Ghostown, 2005)
- Live in Los Angeles (featuring Alex Ligertwood) (Soul Bank Music, 10/2015)
- Looking in the Eye Of The World [Reissue] (Soul Bank Music, 4/2022)
- Voices of Other Times [Reissue] (Soul Bank Music, 5/2022)
- Keys to the Heart [Reissue] (Soul Bank Music, 5/2022)
- Brian Auger's Oblivion Express Play the Trinity Hits featuring Savannah Grace (Soul Bank Music, 7/2022)

=== With CAB (Tony MacAlpine/Bunny Brunel/Dennis Chambers) ===
- CAB (Tone Center, 2000)
- CAB 2 (Tone Center, 2001)
- CAB 4 (Favored Nations, 2003)
- Theatre de Marionnettes (Brunel, 2009)

== Filmography ==
- 1969 – 33⅓ Revolutions Per Monkee
- 1972 – Brian Auger The Oblivion Express (dir. Tomas Dillen, 31 min.)
- 2005 – Brian Auger: Insights of the Keyboard Master
- 2005 – Live at the Baked Potato

== Other sources ==
- Brian Auger discography at Discogs
- Brian Auger's Oblivion Express discography at Discogs
- Daddone, Peter. "Brian Auger In Conversation ", Jazz Review, 29 March 2012.
- "Interview: BRIAN AUGER". Get Ready to Rock, November 2006.
- Staczek, Jason. "Brian Auger's Oblivion Express". Jelly Music Magazine
