= Mujician III (August Air) =

Studio album by Keith Tippett
- Released: 1987
- Recorded: 25 and 26 June 1987
- Genre: Jazz
- Length: 69:48
- Label: FMP Records
- Producer: Jost Gebers

Keith Tippett chronology
Mujician II (1986)	Mujician III (August Air) (1987)	Couple in Spirit (1987)

Professional ratings
Review scores
Source	Rating
AllMusic	4.5/5 stars
The Penguin Guide to Jazz	4/4 stars

Mujician III (August Air) is a solo album by English jazz pianist Keith Tippett. It was released on the FMP record label in 1987.

== Reception ==
AllMusic awarded the album with 4.5 stars and its review by Thom Jurek states: 'The last – and perhaps most brilliant – part in a trilogy of solo works by British pianist and composer Keith Tippett, Mujician III is a bit of a departure from its predecessors. It has only two tracks, one a "love improvisation" to his wife, vocalist Julie Tippett ("I Love You Julie"), and the other an extended meditation on late summer ("August Air").'

== Track listing ==
All tracks composed by Keith Tippett.

1. "I Love You, Julie" – 22:39
2. "August Air" – 47:09

== Personnel ==
- Keith Tippett – piano
