= SuperJam =

SuperJam may refer to:

- 102 JAMZ SuperJam
- SuperJam, a music event organised by British charity The Sunflower Jam
- Super Jam, a live album featuring jazz, pop and traditional standards
