= Martin Archer =

Saxophonist (born 1957)

- Born: 9 March 1957 (age 69); Sheffield, England
- Genres: Avant-garde jazz
- Occupation: Musician
- Instruments: Saxophone, keyboards
- Years active: 1973–present
- Label: Discus

Martin Archer (born 9 March 1957) is an English jazz saxophonist and electronic musician.

== Career ==
Archer entered the British improvisational jazz scene at age 15. His first working band was Bass Tone Trap, with which he recorded an album in the early 1980s. In 1983 he founded the band Hornweb, which released three albums. He also released a solo album called Wild Pathway Favourites in 1988 on his own label, Discus.

In 1993, Archer disbanded Hornweb, temporarily gave up the saxophone, and adopted synthesizers and electronic music. His first solo album in this new style was Ghost Lily Cascade in 1996. His usual recording method is to record jazz musicians as they improvise on acoustic instruments, and then reconstruct the results electronically. He has since released more than 20 solo albums, usually on his Discus label, which sells both his own records and those by other selected artists via mail order. His 2019 album, Another Fantastic Individual, was recorded entirely solo. Since 2019 he has written, performed and recorded 5 albums with the avant-prog band Das Rad.

== Collaborations ==
Archer collaborated with electronic musician Chris Bywater is the duo Transient v Resident, which released albums in 1997 and 2001. Archer collaborates periodically with bluegrass/jazz guitarist John Jasnoch under the name Ask. He co-leads the 30-member improvisational singing group Juxtavoices, which has been described as an "antichoir", and periodically performs with the Murmurists. Archer also collaborated with Julie Tippetts on the albums Ghosts of Gold and Tales of Finin.
