= Befour (album) =

Studio album by Brian Auger
- Released: 1970
- Genre: Jazz, rock, jazz-rock
- Label: RCA Victor
- Producer: Brian Auger

Brian Auger chronology
Jools & Brian (1969)	Befour (1970)	The Best of Brian Auger (1977)

Befour is an album by the English musician Brian Auger, released in 1970. It was the final album on which he was backed by his group the Trinity. The album peaked at No. 184 on the Billboard 200. The band supported it with a North American tour.

== Production ==
"I Want to Take You Higher" is a cover of the Sylvester Stewart song. "Pavane" is an interpretation of the composition by Gabriel Fauré. "Maiden Voyage" was written by Herbie Hancock. "Listen Here" is a cover of the Eddie Harris song, on which Auger used four drummers; the band recorded it in a single take. "No Time to Live" is a version of the Traffic song. "Adagio per Archi e Organo" was composed by Tomaso Albinoni.

== Critical reception ==
Professional ratings
Review scores
Source	Rating
AllMusic	4/5 stars
Casper Star-Tribune	5/5 stars
The Encyclopedia of Popular Music	3/5 stars
MusicHound Jazz: The Essential Album Guide	2.5/5 stars
The New Rolling Stone Record Guide	3/5 stars
TV Radio Mirror	4/4 stars

The Asbury Park Press noted that "the trouble with the group is that it isn't good enough to compete head-on with the better jazz units when it chooses that idiom, and it doesn't offer a distinctive brand of rock". The Times-Union opined that "the Trinity move into the jazz-rock vanguard." The Wichita Eagle and the Beacon said that the band "try to sound like Ramsey Lewis, and they try to sound like Blood, Sweat and Tears."

The Record called Auger "still the best organist in England." The Esher News and Mail said that he "can get to be a bit of a bore when heard continuously." In 2022, Record Collector labeled Befour "a masterful blend of jazz and soul with psych and prog rock".

== Track listing ==
Side 1

1. "I Want to Take You Higher"
2. "Pavane"
3. "No Time to Live"
4. "Maiden Voyage"

Side 2

1. "Listen Here"
2. "Adagio per Archi e Organo"
3. "Just You Just Me"
