= The Bristol Concert =

Live album by Mujician and The Georgian Ensemble
- Released: 2000
- Recorded: 1 June 1991
- Genre: Jazz
- Label: What! Disc

Professional ratings
Review scores
Source	Rating
The Penguin Guide to Jazz Recordings	4/4 stars

The Bristol Concert was a collaboration between the British free jazz quartet Mujician (plus vocalist Julie Tippett) and The Georgian Ensemble, an 11-piece group from Georgia. The concert programme featured compositions by Keith Tippett, who also acted as musical director for the collaboration and played piano.

The concert was recorded and broadcast by the BBC in 1991. A CD was issued in 2000 by What! Disc, a now-defunct subsidiary of Voiceprint. The artwork is a reproduction of a woodcut by Mujician member Paul Dunmall. This edition is out-of-print.

A 2CD budget-package called The Best of Keith Tippett & Julie Tippett was produced by Deja Vu in 2005, consisting of The Bristol Concert on the first disc and the Couple In Spirit II album on the second CD. This edition neglects to include musician credits and the track listing is incorrect; the medley piece 'Dedicated to Mingus/Tortworth Oak' is incorrectly credited as two separate tracks and 'Septober Energy' is not listed. The artwork by Dunmall is not licensed to this edition and is therefore not included.

== Track listing ==
1. "Brass Wind Bells"
2. "Thoughts to Geoff"
3. "Dedicated to Mingus/Tortworth Oak"
4. "A Loose Kite"
5. "Slowly The Sunrise"
6. "Cider Dance"
7. "The Irish Girl’s Tear"
8. "Septober Energy"

All compositions by Keith Tippett
- Recorded live at St George's in Bristol (UK), 1 June 1991

== Personnel ==
Mujician:

- Keith Tippett - piano, conductor
- Paul Dunmall - soprano/tenor saxophone
- Paul Rogers - double bass
- Tony Levin - drums
- Julie Tippett - voice

The Georgian Ensemble:

- Enver Khmirev - trumpet
- Dmitri Saladze - trumpet
- Vakhtang Sirbiladze - trumpet
- Roman Pogoev - trombone
- Grigol Meladze - trombone
- George Beridze - alto saxophone
- George Bagdasarov - alto saxophone
- Chabuki Amiranashvili - tenor saxophone
- David Masteranov - guitar
- Manana Meladze - voice
- Maya Tsitladze - voice
