= Couple in Spirit =

Studio album by Keith Tippett and Julie Tippetts
- Released: 1987
- Genre: Jazz
- Length: 37:08
- Label: EG
- Producer: Keith Tippett, Julie Tippetts

Keith Tippett chronology
Mujician III (August Air) (1987)	Couple in Spirit (1987)	The Journey (1990)

Professional ratings
Review scores
Source	Rating
AllMusic	4.5/5 stars

Couple in Spirit is an album by English jazz pianist Keith Tippett and singer Julie Tippetts. It was released on the EG record label in 1987.

== Reception ==
AllMusic awards the album with 4.5 stars and the review by Thom Jurek states: "The pairing of Keith and Julie Tippett on a recording always causes anticipation; the duo's potential for provocative surprise is seemingly endless. But even so, nothing could have prepared listeners for Couple in Spirit. Far from the hallmarks of jazz or the harsher extremes of free improvisation, CIS is in a sense an eight-part suite that begins with intention, moves through incantation and journey, and finally returns as transformation."

== Track listing ==
Tracks 4 & 8 composed by Keith Tippett; all other tracks by Keith and Julie Tippett.

1. "Daybreak" – 3:13
2. "Morning Psalm" – 2:18
3. "Brimstone Spring Lullaby" – 3:47
4. "Evening Psalm" – 3:32
5. "Marching (We Shall Remember Them)" – 6:04
6. "The Choir and the Sunset Improvisers" – 7:24
7. "The Key at Dusk" – 6:25
8. "Grey Mist With Yellow Waterfall Entwines Evening Turquoise" – 4:25

== Personnel ==
- Keith Tippett – piano, harmonium, harpsichord, voices, bells, bottle
- Julie Tippetts – voices, recorder, zither, bottle, shaker
