= Tony Levin (drummer) =

English jazz drummer (1940–2011)

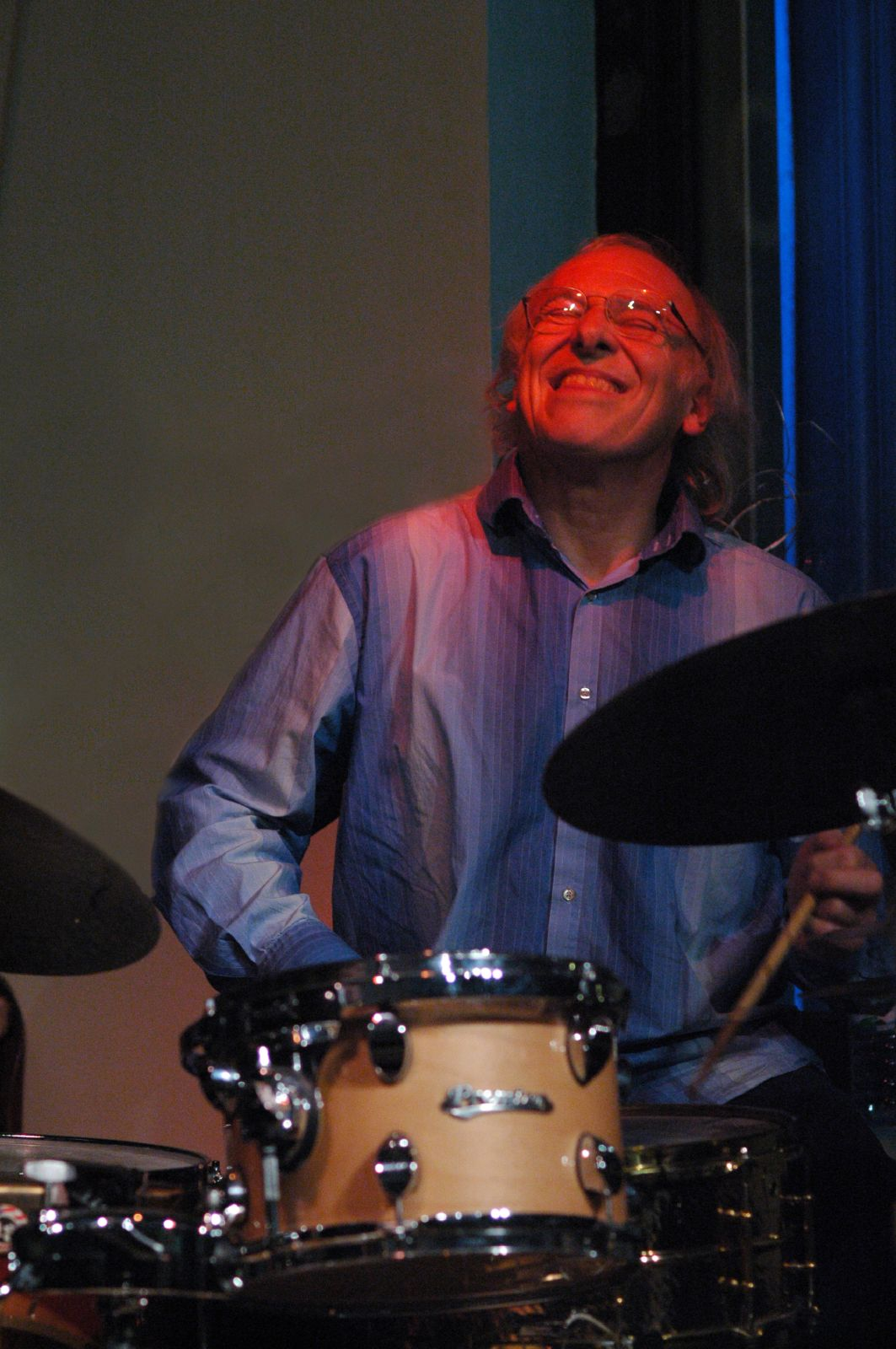
- Levin performing in 2006

Background information
- Born: 30 January 1940; Much Wenlock, Shropshire, England
- Died: 3 February 2011 (aged 71)
- Genres: Jazz
- Instrument: Drums
- Years active: 1960–2010s
- Formerly of: Tubby Hayes, Paul Dunmall

Tony Levin (30 January 1940 – 3 February 2011) was an English jazz drummer.

Levin played at Ronnie Scott's Jazz Club in the 1960s with artists including Joe Harriott, Al Cohn, Harry "Sweets" Edison, Zoot Sims, and Toots Thielemanns.

== Biography ==
Levin was born in Much Wenlock, Shropshire, where his family had been evacuated in the Second World War; they subsequently returned to Birmingham, where as a teenager Levin taught himself to play the drums and began an involvement with the jazz scene.

His first major position came when he joined Tubby Hayes' Quartet (1965–9). He worked with numerous groups and artists, including the Alan Skidmore quintet (1969), Humphrey Lyttelton band (1969), John Taylor (1970s), Ian Carr's Nucleus (1970s), Stan Sulzmann quartet, Gordon Beck's Gyroscope, duo with John Surman (1976), European Jazz Ensemble, Third Eye (1979), Rob van den Broeck (1982), Philip Catherine's trio and quartet (1990s), Sophia Domancich Trio (with Paul Rogers, double bass; 1991–2000), Philippe Aerts trio and quartet (2000s).

From 1980, Levin worked extensively with saxophonist Paul Dunmall, including as a member of the free jazz quartet Mujician, also with Paul Rogers (double bass) and Keith Tippett (piano). In 1994, Levin released his solo album Spiritual Empathy, again with Dunmall on saxophones. In 2006 he played a trio gig with Dunmall and Rogers featuring Ellery Eskelin, Ray Anderson, Tony Malaby as guests at John Zorn's The Stone in NYC. He later recorded with Dunmall with his son Miles Levin on drums.

Levin ran his own monthly club in Birmingham, and often performed duets with Paul Dunmall and guest musicians.
