= 1969 (Julie Driscoll album) =

Studio album by Julie Driscoll
- Released: 1971
- Recorded: 1969
- Studio: Advision Studios, London, England
- Genre: Folk rock
- Label: Polydor
- Producer: Giorgio Gomelsky

Julie Driscoll chronology
Streetnoise (1969)	1969 (1971)	Sunset Glow (1974)

Professional ratings
Review scores
Source	Rating
AllMusic	4/5 stars

1969 is an album by Julie Driscoll.

== Track listing ==
All tracks composed by Julie Driscoll

=== Side one ===
1. "A New Awakening"
2. "Those That We Love"
3. "Leaving It All Behind"
4. "Break-Out"

=== Side two ===
1. "The Choice"
2. "Lullaby"
3. "Walk Down"
4. "I Nearly Forgot – But I Went Back"

== Personnel ==
- Julie Driscoll - vocals, acoustic guitars
- Chris Spedding - guitars, bass
- Keith Tippett - piano, celeste, arrangements
- Elton Dean - alto saxophone
- Nick Evans - trombone
- Brian Godding - electric guitar, voices
- Trevor Tomkins - drums
- Derek Wadsworth - trombone
- Jeff Clyne - bass, arco bass
- Mark Charig - cornet
- Karl Jenkins - oboe
- Bud Parkes - trumpet
- Stan Sulzmann - alto saxophone
- Brian Belshaw - bass guitar, voices
- Jim Cregan - guitar
- Barry Reeves - drums
- Bob Downes - flute

== Production ==
- Produced by Giorgio Gomelsky
- Recorded at Advision Studios, London, England, 1969
- Engineer : Eddy Offord
- Grahame Berney, Keith Davis, Oliver Wade - art direction and design
