= Streetnoise =

Studio album by Julie Driscoll, Brian Auger and The Trinity
- Released: July 1969
- Recorded: 1969
- Studio: Advision Studios, London, England
- Genre: Progressive rock, art rock
- Length: 74:04
- Label: Marmalade 608005/6 (UK) / Atco / Polydor
- Producer: Giorgio Gomelsky

Julie Driscoll chronology
Open (1967)	Streetnoise (1969)	1969 (1971)

Brian Auger chronology
Definitely What! (1968)	Streetnoise (1969)	Befour (1969)

Professional ratings
Review scores
Source	Rating
Allmusic	4.5/5 stars
Rolling Stone	(favorable)

Streetnoise is a 1969 album by Julie Driscoll with Brian Auger and the Trinity, originally released as a double LP.

It includes cover versions of The Doors’ "Light My Fire", Nina Simone’s "Take Me To The Water", Laura Nyro’s "Save the Country", Miles Davis' "All Blues", Richie Havens' "Indian Rope Man", and "Let The Sunshine In" and "I Got Life" from the musical Hair. Driscoll covers this wide range of musical influences easily and with her highly emotive and distinctive vocals, and with Auger's intense Hammond organ, the album is instrumentally interesting, too.

Streetnoise was a record that may have been informed by its era, but it certainly isn't stuck there, especially as the 21st century opens. The music here sounds as fresh and exciting as the day it was recorded. The sound on the reissue is completely remastered and packed in deluxe form; it all adds up to a must-have package for anyone interested in the development of Auger's music that was to change immediately after this record with the invention of the Oblivion Express, and also for those interested in Driscoll's most brave, innovative, and fascinating career as an improviser who discovered entirely new ways of using the human voice. Streetnoise is brilliant.

— Thom Jurek, Allmusic

== Chart performance ==
The album debuted on Billboard magazine's Top LP's chart in the issue dated June 14, 1969, peaking at No. 41 during a sixteen-week run on the chart. The album debuted on Cashbox magazine's Top 100 Albums chart in the issue dated July 19, 1969, peaking at No. 95 during a two-week run on the chart.

== Track listing ==
=== LP side 1 ===
sub-titled: HOW GOOD WOULD IT BE TO FEEL FREE

1. "Tropic of Capricorn" (Brian Auger) 5:30
2. "Czechoslovakia" (Julie Driscoll) 6:45
3. "Take Me to the Water" (Nina Simone) 4:00
4. "A Word About Colour" (Julie Driscoll) 1:35

=== LP side 2 ===
sub-titled: KISS HIM QUICK, HE HAS TO PART

5. "Light My Fire" (John Densmore, Robby Krieger, Ray Manzarek, Jim Morrison) 4:30
6. "Indian Rope Man" (Richie Havens, Joe Price, Mark Roth) 3:00
7. "When I Was a Young Girl" (Traditional; arranged by Julie Driscoll) 7:00
8. "The Flesh Failures (Let the Sunshine In)" (James Rado, Gerome Ragni, Galt MacDermot) 3:05

=== LP side 3 ===
sub-titled: LOOKING IN THE EYE OF THE WORLD

9. "Ellis Island" (Brian Auger) 4:10
10. "In Search of the Sun" (Dave Ambrose) 4:25
11. "Finally Found You Out" (Brian Auger) 4:15
12. "Looking in the Eye of the World" (Brian Auger) 5:05

=== LP side 4 ===
sub-titled: SAVE THE COUNTRY

13. "Vauxhall to Lambeth Bridge" (Julie Driscoll) 6:30
14. "All Blues" (Miles Davis, Oscar Brown) 5:40
15. "I've Got Life" (James Rado, Gerome Ragni, Galt MacDermot) 4:30
16. "Save the Country" (Laura Nyro) 3:56

== Personnel ==
- Brian "Auge" Auger - B-3 organ, piano, electric piano, vocals
- Julie "Jools" Driscoll - lead vocals, acoustic guitar
- David "Lobs" Ambrose - 4- and 6- string electric basses, acoustic guitar, vocals
- Clive "Toli" Thacker - drums, percussion

== Charts ==
Chart (1969)	Peak position
US Billboard Top LPs	41
US Cashbox Top 100 Albums	95
