= Super Jam =

1990 live album by various artists

Live album by Brian Auger Pete York Harvey Weston Dick Morrissey Roy Williams Zoot Money Maria Muldaur
- Released: 1990
- Recorded: Live SDR/Stuttgart, November & December 1989
- Genre: jazz
- Label: Delta Music GmbH
- Producer: Michael Maschke

Super Jam is a live studio recording featuring jazz, pop and traditional standards, many of them film scores, included in the German TV series, Villa Fantastica. The album featured the series' musical director Brian Auger on piano, Pete York on drums, Dick Morrissey on tenor saxophone, Roy Williams on trombone, Harvey Weston on bass guitar, plus the singers Zoot Money and Maria Muldaur.

== Track listing ==
1. "Ding-Dong! The Witch Is Dead" - H. Arlen & Y. Harburg/B. Auger (2.40)
2. "Danny Boy" - Trad./B. Auger (4.01)
3. "What A Wonderful World" - G. D. Weiss & R. Thiele/B. Auger (3.35)
4. "Fly Me To The Moon" - B. Howard/B. Auger (3.17)
5. "Tara's Theme" - M. Steiner & Mc. David (4.36)
6. "Take These Chains from My Heart" - W. H. Heath & F. Rose (1.59)
7. "As Time Goes By" - H. Hupfeld (2.57)
8. "Lullaby of Broadway" - H. Warren & A. Dubin (2.53)
9. "Rockin' Chair" - H. Carmichael (4.41)
10. "You Are So Beautiful" - B. Preston (3.09)
11. "Lover Man" - J. Davis & R. Ramirez (5.31)
12. "Peter Gunn" - H. Mancini (2.05)
13. "Come Sunday" - D. Ellington (2.57)
14. "Hooray For Hollywood" - R. Whiting & J. Mercer (3.06)
15. "When You Wish Upon A Star" - N. Washington & L. Harline (2.59)
16. "Over The Rainbow" - H. Arlen & Y. Harburg (2.36)
