= Julie Driscoll =

English singer and actress (b. 1947)

Julie Driscoll Tippett
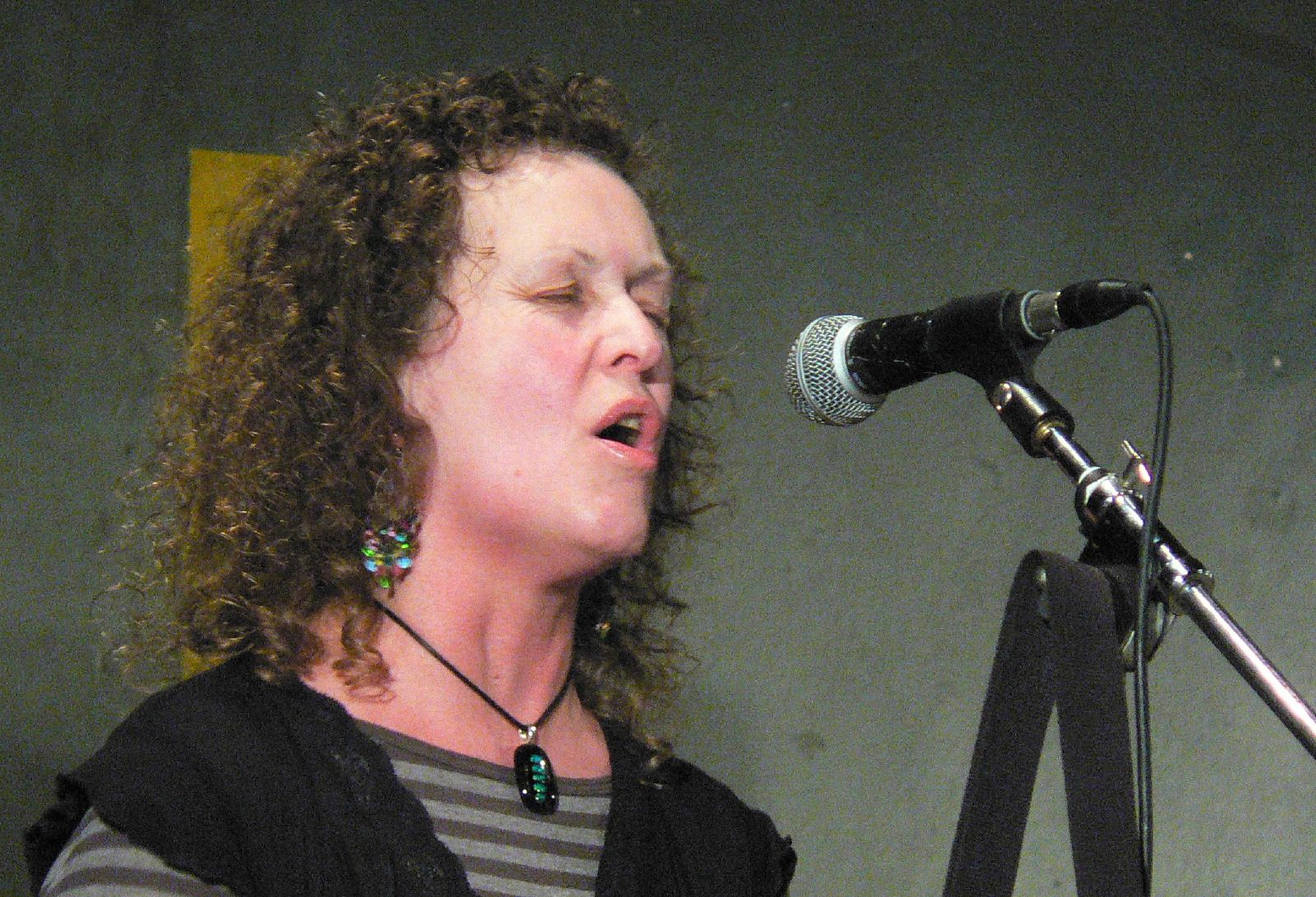
- Driscoll in 2007

Background information
- Born: Julie Driscoll; 8 June 1947 (age 79); London, England
- Genres: Pop; R&B; jazz; rock
- Occupations: Singer, actress
- Instrument: Vocals
- Years active: 1960s–present
- Labels: Discus Music, Marmalade

Julie Driscoll Tippett (born 8 June 1947) is an English singer and actress, known for her work with Brian Auger and her husband, Keith Tippett.

== Career ==
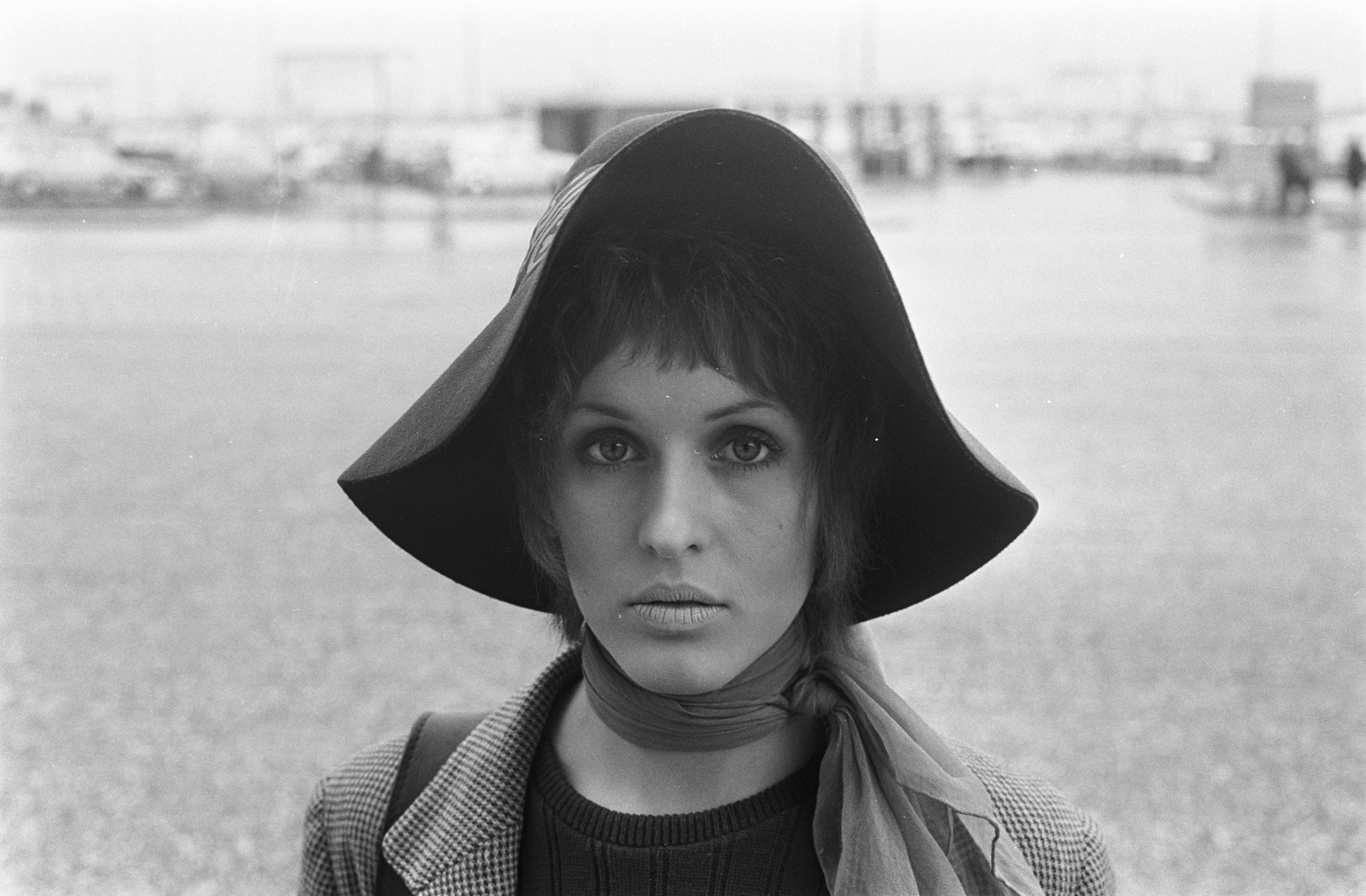
Driscoll at Schiphol Airport in 1968

Driscoll is known for her 1960s versions of Bob Dylan and Rick Danko's "This Wheel's on Fire", and Donovan's "Season of the Witch", both with Brian Auger and the Trinity. Along with the Trinity, she was featured prominently in the 1969 television special 33⅓ Revolutions per Monkee, singing "I'm a Believer" in a soul style with Micky Dolenz. She and Auger had previously worked in Steampacket, with Long John Baldry and Rod Stewart.

"This Wheel's on Fire" reached number five in the United Kingdom in June 1968, number 13 in Canada, and Bubbled Under the Billboard Hot 100 in the United States at number 106 that August. With distortion, the imagery of the title and the group's dress and performance, this version came to represent the psychedelic era in British rock music. Driscoll recorded the song again in the early 1990s with Adrian Edmondson as the theme to the BBC comedy series Absolutely Fabulous.

A turning point for Driscoll was meeting Keith Tippett when his group were among the session players on her first solo album 1969 released in 1971. She soon after married Tippett and has since that time concentrated on experimental vocal music, using the name Julie Tippetts, which adopts the original spelling of her husband's surname. She frequently collaborated with Tippett, not only as a duo - which includes 1987's Couple in Spirit album - but also on many of his group projects, up until his death in 2020. In 2009 she also started collaborating with saxophonist/multi-instrumentalist Martin Archer up until the present, releasing a half-dozen albums up through 2022.

She took part in Keith Tippett's big band Centipede, and sang in Robert Wyatt's Theatre Royal Drury Lane concert in 1974. She released a solo album, Sunset Glow, in 1975; was lead vocalist on Carla Bley's album Tropic Appetites; and performed on John Wolf Brennan's "HeXtet".

Later in the 1970s, she toured with her own band and recorded and performed as one of the vocal quartet Voice, with Maggie Nichols, Phil Minton, and Brian Eley. She reunited with Auger for the 1978 album Encore.

In the early 1980s, Julie Tippett was a guest vocalist on an early single by pop-jazz band Working Week, on the 1984 song "Storm of Light", which brought them to the attention of a wider audience. She also sang on Working Week's final album from 1989, Fire in the Mountain.

== Discography ==
=== LP/CD releases of note ===
Below is a selected list of Driscoll's work, sorted mostly by recording date:

- 1963 – "Take Me by the Hand (And Lead Me)" (with Harold Geller Group)
- 1967 – Open (with Brian Auger & The Trinity)
- 1968 – "This Wheel's on Fire" (with Brian Auger & the Trinity)
- 1968 – "Road To Cairo" (with Brian Auger & the Trinity)
- 1969 – Streetnoise (with Brian Auger & the Trinity)
- 1969 – Jools & Brian (with Brian Auger & the Trinity) – compilation of early UK singles (rec. 1965–1967): Five Parlophone titles by Driscoll, and six Columbia titles by Auger & The Trinity (Capitol)
- 1970 – The Best of Julie Driscoll, Brian Auger & The Trinity – compilation (Polydor) (number 94 Canada)
- 1971 – 1969 (featuring the Keith Tippett Group)
- 1971 – Quartet Sequence (with John Stevens, Ron Herman and Trevor Watts)
- 1971 – Septober Energy (with Centipede) (recorded at Wessex Sound Studios, London, during three days, produced by Robert Fripp)
- 1972 – Blueprint (with Keith Tippett, Roy Babbington, Frank Perry and Keith Bailey) (produced by Robert Fripp)
- 1974 – Tropic Appetites (with Carla Bley)
- 1974 – Genesis: Brian Auger & The Trinity Featuring Julie Driscoll – compilation (Polydor)
- 1975 – The Rock Peter and The Wolf (an arrangement of songs of the classic Peter and the Wolf story, with Gary Brooker, Bill Bruford, Phil Collins, Stephane Grappelli, Jack Lancaster, Jon Hiseman, Brian Eno, Alvin Lee, Gary Moore, Cozy Powell, Manfred Mann, Keith Tippett, Viv Stanshall)
- 1976 – Ovary Lodge (with Keith Tippett, Harry Miller and Frank Perry)
- 1976 – Sunset Glow (featuring Keith Tippett Group)
- 1978 – (22, 23, 24 May) Frames: Music for an Imaginary Film (Keith Tippett's Ark) (recorded at Wessex Sound Studios, London)
- 1978 – Encore (with Brian Auger)
- 1982 – (29 June – 3 July) with Company (Ursula Oppens, Fred Frith, George E. Lewis, Akio Suzuki, Keith Tippett, Moto Yoshizawa, Anne Le Baron, Phil Wachsmann & Derek Bailey) (recorded in London during Company Week)
- 1984 – "Storm of Light" – single with Working Week
- 1987 – Couple in Spirit (duet with Keith Tippett) (mixed by Robert Fripp)
- 1989 – Fire in the Mountain (with Working Week)
- 1989 – Women With Voices (track number 12, with Maggie Nicols, Sue Ferrar and Sylvia Hallett, recorded live, 4 March, at Air Gallery, London)
- 1991 – (1 June) The Bristol Concert (with Mujician & The Georgian Ensemble as honorary guest) (recorded live at St. George's concert hall, Brandon Hill, Bristol, UK, for BBC)
- 1992 – Best of Julie Driscoll & Brian Auger – compilation (Polydor)
- 1992 – (2 and 3 January) Spirits Rejoice (with The Dedication Orchestra) (recorded at Gateway Studios, Kingston, Surrey, UK)
- 1993 – (23 October) Twilight Etchings (with Willi Kellers & Keith Tippett) (recorded at the Podewil in Berlin during the Total Music Meeting)
- 1994 – (3, 4, 5 January) Ixesha (Time) (with The Dedication Orchestra) (recorded at Gateway Studios, Kingston, Surrey, UK)
- 1996 – Couple in Spirit II (duet with Keith Tippett) (recorded live at The Stadtgarten, Cologne)
- 1998 – (6 February & 30 April) The First Full Turn (with RoTToR: Paul Rutherford, Julie & Keith Tippett, Paul Rogers) (recorded at various locations)
- 1998 – (3 May) First Weaving: Live at Le Mans Jazz Festival (Keith Tippett Tapestry Orchestra)
- 1998 – "HeXtet: Through the Ear of a Raindrop" (with John Wolf Brennan, Evan Parker, Paul Rutherford, Chris Cutler and Peter Whyman (Leo Records 254)
- 1999 – The Mod Years (1965–1969...Complete Singles, B-sides and Rare Tracks) – compilation (Disconforme; later released on Fresh Fruit/MIG 00492)
- 1999 – Shadow Puppeteer – solo
- 2001 – If Your Memory Serves You Well (The Giorgio Gomelsky Sessions) – compilation (Dressed To Kill) [previously released on Charly as London 1964-1967]
- 2002 – (November & February) Fluvium (with Martin Archer and Geraldine Monk) (electronics recorded at Telecottage, Sheffield, between January 2000 & March 2002; vocals & acoustic instruments recorded at The Sound Kitchen, Sheffield, between November 2001 and February 2002)
- 2003 – The Dartington Trio (with Keith Tippett and Paul Dunmall) – Live at the BBC & live at The Vortex
- 2004 – (8 August) Dartington Improvising Trio (with Keith Tippett and Paul Dunmall) – Live at The Priory (recorded live at Priory Park, 3rd Southend International Jazz Festival)
- 2004 – A Kind of Love-In 1967–1971 – compilation (Raven)
- 2004 – (5 September) Viva La Black: Live at Ruvo Jazz Festival (with Keith Tippett, Louis Moholo-Moholo and Canto General) in Ruvo di Puglia, Bari, Apulia, Italy
- 2005 – (24 April) Mahogany Rain (with Paul Dunmall, Philip Gibbs and Keith Tippett) (recorded at Victoria Rooms Studio, Bristol, UK)
- 2008 – (14 November) Couple in Spirit – Live at the Purcell Room (duet with Keith Tippett) (recorded at the Purcell Room, London, as part of the 2008 London Jazz Festival)
- 2008 – Nostalgia 77 Sessions featuring Keith & Julie Tippett
- 2009 – Ghosts of Gold (with Martin Archer)
- 2011 – Tales of FiNiN (with Martin Archer)
- 2011 – (30 & 31 January) From Granite to Wind (with Keith Tippett Octet)
- 2012 – Serpentine (with Martin Archer)
- 2015 – Vestigium (with Martin Archer)
- 2016 – The Nine Dances of Patrick O'Gonogon (with Keith Tippett Octet)
- 2022 – Illusion (with Martin Archer)

=== Early UK singles ===
Parlophone (UK) Records:

- Jun 1965 – R 5296 – "Don't Do It No More" / "I Know You" (with Blossom Toes)
- May 1966 – R 5444 – "I Didn't Want To Have To Do It" / "Don't Do It No More"
- Apr 1967 – R 5588 – "I Know You Love Me Not" / "If You Should Ever Leave Me"
