= Mujician =

UK musical group

Mujician were a free improvising and free jazz quartet. The core members were Paul Dunmall (reeds), Keith Tippett (piano), Paul Rogers (bass) and Tony Levin (drums and percussion). The band's name "comes from Tippett's daughter, describing what dad does for a living".

Mujician formed in 1988. Their first album, The Journey, contains a single track recorded live at the 1990 Bath Festival. Poem About the Hero is also a live recording, done in front of a small audience; their first studio session was Colours Fulfilled, made in 1997. The 2000 The Bristol Concert release was recorded in 1991 and added Julie Tippetts on vocals and the Georgian Ensemble. This was followed by Spacetime (2001) and There's No Going Back Now (2005). Mujician retained the same core group of four members and toured in 2010 to mark Levin's seventieth birthday. These were their final performances, as the drummer died in February of the following year.

== Discography ==
- The Journey (Cuneiform, 1990)
- The Bristol Concert (What Disc, 1991)
- Poem About the Hero (Cuneiform, 1992)
- Birdman (Cuneiform, 1995)
- Colours Fulfilled (Cuneiform, 1997)
- Spacetime (Cuneiform, 2001)
- There's No Going Back Now (Cuneiform, 2005)
- 10 10 10 (Cuneiform, 2021)
- In Concerts (Jazz in Britain, 2025)
