= Rose Palace =

Coordinates: 34°7′53″N 118°8′57″W

The Rose Palace, also known as the Pasadena Rose Palace, is a building located at 835 South Raymond Avenue in the city of Pasadena, California. It was built by the Pasadena Tournament of Roses Association in 1964.

The primary use of The Rose Palace had always been for the construction of floats for the Tournament of Roses Parade, which is held every New Year's Day in the city of Pasadena. The Rose Palace was one of three "float barns" built for float construction in the mid-1900s. Parade float construction primarily takes place from October through the end of December of each year. The venue was occupied by Bent Parade Floats (which later became Phoenix Decorating), one of the main float construction companies for the parade. Phoenix relocated to a concrete tilt-up warehouse building (Rose Float Plaza South) in the City of Irwindale in 2017.

In the late 1960s and early 1970s, through the months of January to September, the Rose Palace was used for other functions besides annual float construction. Most notable was that of a rock concert venue. It was during this time that the facility came to be known as The Pasadena Rose Palace, a Los Angeles Rock Ballroom. Notable rock bands and musicians such as Led Zeppelin, The Byrds, The Grateful Dead, The Who and Joe Cocker played at this venue. Led Zeppelin's two performances at The Pasadena Rose Palace, on 2 and 3 May 1969, are amongst the better documented of the concerts which took place there.

Other float decorating facilities are the Rosemont Pavilion (Pasadena) and Rose Float Plaza North and South, in Irwindale, California
