= Brian Auger and the Trinity =

British musical band

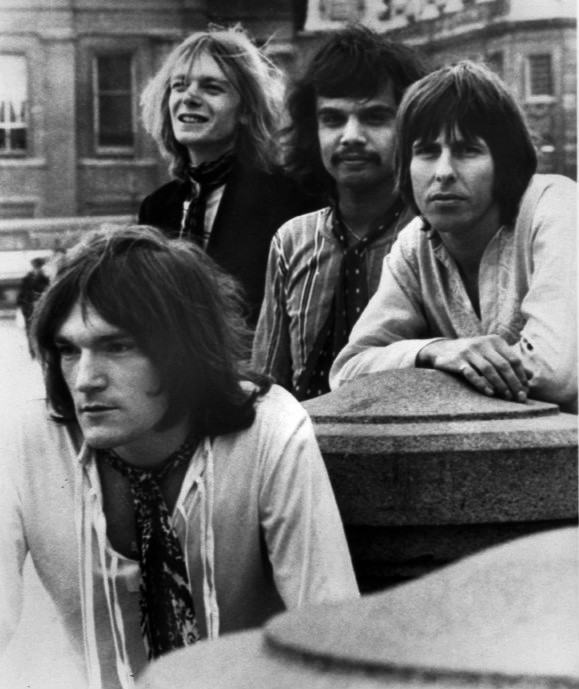
- Brian Auger and the Trinity in 1970. Clockwise from bottom: Brian Auger, Dave Ambrose, Gary Boyle, Clive Thacker.

Background information
- Origin: United Kingdom
- Genres: Rhythm and blues; jazz; rock; gospel
- Years active: 1966–1970
- Label: RCA Records

Brian Auger and the Trinity was a British band led by keyboardist Brian Auger. His duet with Julie Driscoll, the Bob Dylan/Rick Danko–penned "This Wheel's on Fire", was a number 5 hit on the 1968 UK Singles Chart.

The song also reached number 13 in Canada.

Brian Auger and the Trinity and Driscoll's joint album, Open, billed as Julie Driscoll, Brian Auger and the Trinity, reached number 12 in the UK Albums Chart the same year. 1969's double LP Streetnoise was also credited to the same Driscoll/Auger/Trinity group name.

The group and Driscoll opened for Led Zeppelin at the Rose Palace in Pasadena, California on 2 and 3 May 1969.

== Members ==
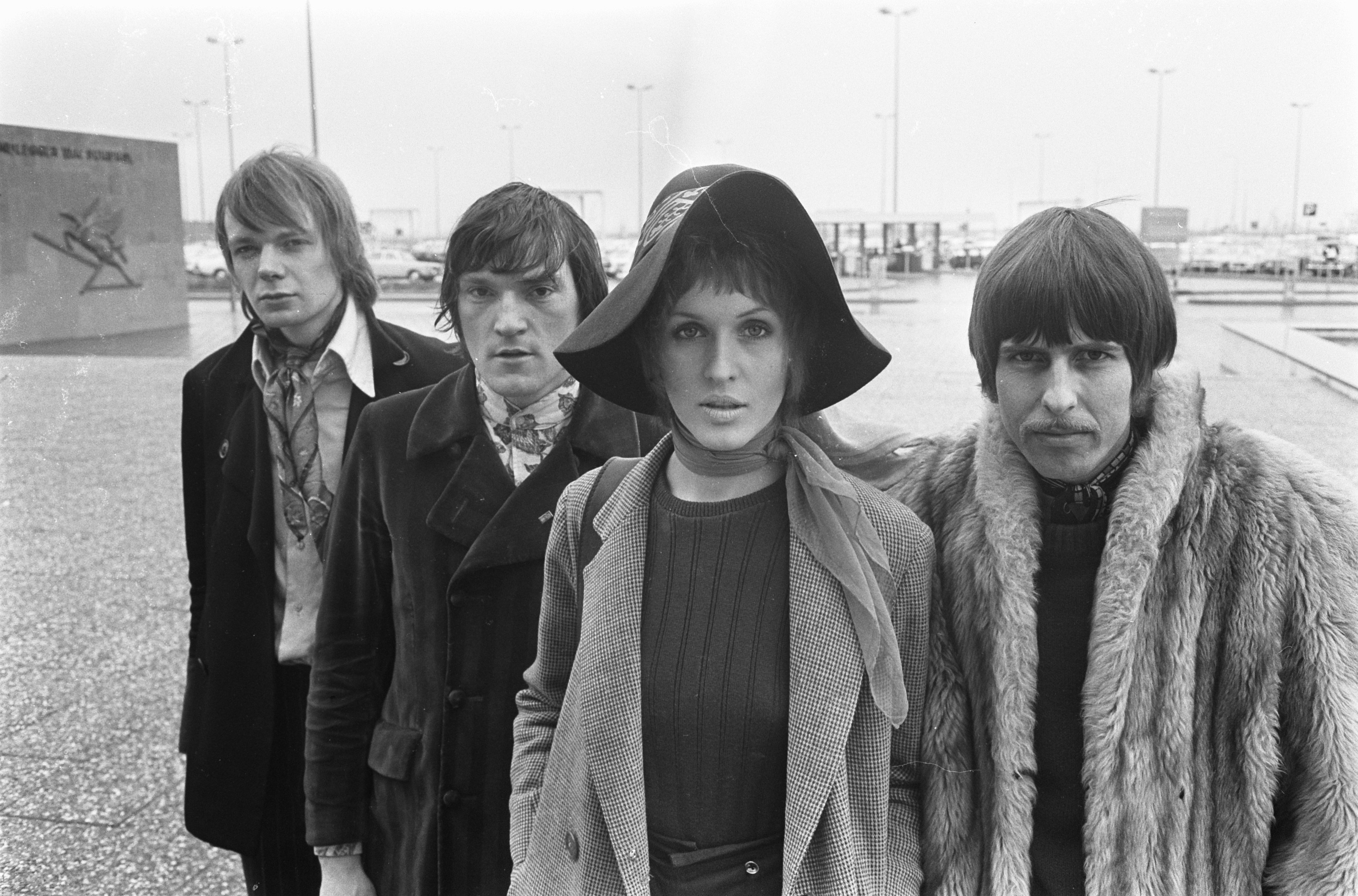
The Trinity with Driscoll in 1968. Left to right: Dave Ambrose, Brian Auger, Julie Driscoll, Clive Thacker

- Brian Auger (electric organ, piano, electric piano, lead and backing vocals)
- Vic Briggs (guitar)
- Gary Boyle (guitar, lead and backing vocals)
- Rick Laird (string bass)
- Ricky Brown (AKA Ricky Fenson) (bass)
- Roger Sutton (bass)
- Dave Ambrose (bass, backing vocals)
- Philip Kinorra (drums)
- Clem Cattini (drums)
- Micky Waller (drums)
- Clive Thacker (drums)

== Discography ==
=== Singles ===
- May 1965: Fool Killer / Let's Do It Tonight
- Oct 1965: Green Onions '65 / Kiko
- Apr 1966: Shake / I Just Got Some [ Rod Stewart featuring Brian Auger & The Trinity]
- Mar 1967: Tiger / Oh Baby, Won't You Come Back Home To Croydon, Where Everybody Beedle An' Bo's
- Oct 1967: Red Beans And Rice (Pt. 1) / Red Beans And Rice (Pt. 2)
- Nov 1967: Save Me (Pt. 1) / Save Me (Pt. 2)
- Apr 1968: This Wheel's On Fire/A Kind Of Love-In
- Oct 1968: Road To Cairo /Shadows Of You
- May 1969: What You Gonna Do / Bumpin' On Sunset
- Sep 1969: Take Me To The Water / Indian Rope Man
- May 1970: I Want to Take You Higher / Just Me Just You
- 1970: Listen Here / I Want To Take You Higher

=== Albums ===
Year	Title	Chart positions		Label	Notes
Year	Title	US BB	US CB	Label	Notes
November 1967	Open	—	100	Marmalade/ Polydor	
1968	Don't Send Me No Flowers	—	—	Marmalade/ Polydor	Sonny Boy Williamson with Brian Auger & The Trinity, Jimmy Page, Joe Harriot and Alan Skidmore, recorded January 1965
March 1969	Definitely What!	—	—	Marmalade/ Polydor	
July 1969	Streetnoise	41	95	Marmalade/ Polydor/ Atco	
1969	Jools & Brian	194	—	Capitol/ MFP	Compilation of early UK singles: 5 Parlophone titles by Julie Driscoll, and 6 Columbia titles by Brian Auger & The Trinity, recorded 1965–1967
1970	The Best Of Julie Driscoll, Brian Auger & The Trinity	—	—	Polydor	Compilation
1970	Befour	—	—	RCA Victor	
