= This Wheel's on Fire =

Bob Dylan song

Song by Bob Dylan and the Band

from the album The Basement Tapes
- Released: June 26, 1975
- Recorded: 1967
- Genre: Rock
- Length: 3:52
- Label: Columbia
- Songwriters: Bob Dylan; Rick Danko
- Producers: Bob Dylan; The Band

Official audio
- "This Wheel's on Fire" on YouTube

"This Wheel's on Fire" is a song written by Bob Dylan and Rick Danko. It was originally recorded by Dylan and the Band during their 1967 sessions, portions of which (including this song) comprised the 1975 album The Basement Tapes.

The Band's own version appeared on their 1968 album Music from Big Pink. Live versions by the Band appear on their 1972 live double album Rock of Ages, as well as the more complete four-CD–DVD version of that concert, Live at the Academy of Music 1971, and the 2002 Box Set of The Last Waltz (the song did not make it into the movie or the original soundtrack album).

A version by Julie Driscoll with Brian Auger and the Trinity became a hit in 1968, peaking at number 5 on the UK Singles Chart and at number 13 in Canada.

== Background ==
Danko recounted how the song was written: "We would come together every day and work and Dylan would come over. He gave me the typewritten lyrics to 'This Wheel's On Fire'. At that time I was teaching myself to play the piano.... Some music I had written on the piano the day before just seemed to fit with Dylan's lyrics. I worked on the phrasing and the melody. Then Dylan and I wrote the chorus together."

Danko continued to perform the song in concert during his solo career, and recorded a new studio version, with Garth Hudson on accordion, for his posthumously released 2000 album Times Like These. Hudson also recorded a new studio version, with Neil Young on lead vocal and the Sadies as back-up band, for his 2010 all-Canadian compilation, Garth Hudson Presents a Canadian Celebration of The Band (re-released in 2012 as Chest Fever: A Canadian Tribute to The Band).

Levon Helm, who sang harmony with Danko on the Band's version and who used the title of the song for his memoir of his time with the Band, This Wheel's on Fire: Levon Helm and the Story of the Band, performed the song live with the Levon Helm Band (later known as the Midnight Ramble Band). The Levon Helm Band performed the song after his death at the Love for Levon benefit concert and tribute held on October 3, 2012, that version appearing on the 2013 CD-DVD set Love For Levon: A Benefit to Save the Barn. The Midnight Ramble Band continued to perform the song during its live shows at least through 2016, opening with it at The Last Waltz 40th Anniversary Celebration at Lincoln Center Out of Doors on August 6, 2016.

Dylan performed the song regularly during his live tours from 1996 through 2012.

== Personnel ==
- Rick Danko – lead vocal, bass guitar
- Levon Helm – drums, backing vocal
- Garth Hudson – clavinet, Lowrey organ, Rocksichord through a telegraph key
- Richard Manuel – piano, backing vocal
- Robbie Robertson – electric guitar

== Covers ==
"This Wheel's on Fire"

Single by Siouxsie and the Banshees

from the album Through the Looking Glass
- B-side: "Shooting Sun"; "Sleepwalking (On the High Wire)"; "She Cracked"
- Released: January 5, 1987
- Recorded: 1986
- Genre: Alternative rock
- Length: 5:17
- Label: Polydor; Geffen (US)
- Songwriters: Bob Dylan; Rick Danko
- Producers: Siouxsie and the Banshees; Mike Hedges

Siouxsie and the Banshees singles chronology
"Candyman" (1986)	"This Wheel's on Fire" (1987)	"The Passenger" (1987)

Music video
- "This Wheel's on Fire" on YouTube

In 1968, a version by Julie Driscoll with Brian Auger and the Trinity became a hit in the United Kingdom, peaking at number 5 on the UK Singles Chart, number 13 in Canada, and reaching number 106 on the U.S. Bubbling Under Hot 100 Singles chart. With its use of distortion, phasing, the evocative imagery of the song's title and the group's flamboyant dress, this version is closely associated with the psychedelic era in British music. The band performed the song on the West German television music programme Beat-Club on 22 June that year. The arrangement featured prominent use of both Hammond organ and mellotron. Driscoll recorded the song again in the early 1990s with Adrian Edmondson as the theme to the BBC comedy series Absolutely Fabulous, whose main characters are throwbacks to that era. Australian singer Kylie Minogue released a cover of the track as the official theme song for 2016's Absolutely Fabulous: The Movie.

The Byrds released a recording of "This Wheel's on Fire" on their 1969 album Dr. Byrds & Mr. Hyde, and live versions of the song are also included on the Byrds' Live at the Fillmore – February 1969 album and the expanded CD reissue of their (Untitled) album.

In 1987, the song was covered by British rock band Siouxsie and the Banshees for their all-covers album Through the Looking Glass. Released as the first single from that album, Siouxsie and the Banshees' version climbed to number 14 on the UK Singles Chart. The band did not know the song had been composed by Dylan and Danko before recording it: they covered it because they liked Driscoll's version.

Australian pop rock group Flake had a number 24 hit on the Go-Set National Top 60 with their rendition in July 1970, which remained in the charts for 22 weeks.

Other artists who have released their own versions of the song include: Hamilton Camp, Phil Lesh, Golden Earring, Elvis Costello, the Hollies, Ian and Sylvia, Les Fradkin, Leslie West, Serena Ryder, Charlie Winston, June Tabor, Guster, Marco Benevento, Rat Scabies and Bele Vrane.
